= 1949 in American television =

This is a list of American television-related events in 1949.

== Events ==
Date	Event	Ref.
January 11	All four American television networks (ABC, CBS, NBC, and DuMont) broadcast a two-hour special celebrating the linking of the eastern and mid-western networks via a coaxial cable.	
January 31	The annual Emmy Awards were presented and broadcast on television for the first time ever, from Los Angeles.	
May	Milton Berle hosts the first-ever telethon, which lasted 24 hours, to benefit the Damon Runyon Cancer Fund.	
August 29	The development of RCA's compatible color television system was announced.	
September	The ABC Television Network becomes the first television network to offer a four-hour primetime programming schedule on Sunday nights.	
September	The 1949-50 television season marks the first time all four networks offered at least some prime time programming on all seven nights of the week.	
December 29	KC2XAK in Bridgeport, Connecticut, the first-ever experimental UHF television station to operate a daily schedule, begins operation.	
Unknown	The Sears and Roebuck catalog offers television sets by mail order for the first time.	

== Television programs ==
=== Debuts ===
Date	Debut	Network
January	TV Department Store	DuMont
January 3	Colgate Theatre	NBC
January 3	NBC Presents	NBC
January 6	Suspense	CBS
January 12	Arthur Godfrey and His Friends	CBS
January 12	Photographic Horizons	DuMont
January 16	ABC Television Players	ABC
January 17	Café de Paris	DuMont
January 17	Johnny Olson's Rumpus Room	DuMont
January 17	Manhattan Spotlight	DuMont
January 18	The School House	DuMont
January 20	Hotel Broadway	DuMont
January 21	Your Show Time	NBC
January 27	Window on the World	DuMont
January 28	Admiral Broadway Revue	NBC/DuMont
January 31	These Are My Children	NBC
February 16	Camel News Caravan	NBC
February 21	ABC Barn Dance	ABC
February 21	A Woman to Remember	DuMont
February 28	Time for Beany	Paramount Television Network
March 1	Believe It or Not!	NBC
March 7	Teen Time Tunes	DuMont
March 7	The Vincent Lopez Show	DuMont
March	Feature Theatre	DuMont
March 10	Flight to Rhythm	DuMont
March 15	And Everything Nice	DuMont
March 25	Front Row Center	DuMont
March 26	Think Fast	ABC
April 5	Fireside Theatre	NBC
April 17	The Fred Waring Show	CBS
May 5	Blind Date	ABC
May 5	Crusade in Europe	ABC
May 8	Wesley	CBS
June 4	Cavalcade of Stars	DuMont
June 4	Spin the Picture	DuMont
June 22	Program Playhouse	DuMont
June 27	Captain Video and His Video Rangers	DuMont
June 27	Time for Reflection	DuMont
June 28	Fireball Fun for All	NBC
July 1	Mama	CBS
July 4	Broadway to Hollywood	DuMont
July 7	They're Off	DuMont
July 13	Talent Jackpot	DuMont
July 18	The Magic Cottage	DuMont
August 24	Hands of Murder	DuMont
August 29	Versatile Varieties	NBC
September	Amateur Boxing Fight Club	DuMont
September	Boxing From Sunnyside Gardens	DuMont
September	Cinema Varieties	DuMont
September	Jim and Judy in Teleland	First-run Syndication
September 1	Martin Kane, Private Eye	NBC
September 2	The Al Morgan Show	DuMont
September 6	The O'Neills	DuMont
September 9	The Family Genius	DuMont
September 9	Wrestling from Sunnyside Gardens	DuMont
September 9	Mystery Theater	DuMont
September 11	The Magic Clown	NBC
September 11	Chicagoland Mystery Players	DuMont
September 11	They Stand Accused	DuMont
September 13	Uptown Jubilee	DuMont
September 15	The Lone Ranger	ABC
September 16	The Big Story	NBC
September 17	Wrestling from Marigold	DuMont
September 21	Starring Boris Karloff	ABC
September 22	The Ed Wynn Show	CBS
September 23	Oboler Comedy Theater	ABC
September 28	Photocrime	ABC
October	Music & the Spoken Word	First-run Syndication
October 2	The Aldrich Family	NBC
October 4	The Life of Riley	NBC
October 5	The Crisis	NBC
October 7	Fishing and Hunting Club	DuMont
October 7	Man Against Crime	CBS
October 12	Famous Jury Trials	DuMont
October 12	The Plainclothesman	DuMont
October 16	Let There Be Stars	ABC
October 23	The Ruggles	ABC
November	The Herb Shriner Show	CBS
November 2	Twenty Questions	WWOR-TV
November 3	Romance	CBS
November 4	One Man's Family	NBC
December 1	Kay Kyser's Kollege of Musical Knowledge	NBC
December 14	Easy Aces	DuMont

=== Changes of network affiliation ===
Show	Moved from	Moved to
Candid Camera	ABC	NBC
Bowling Headliners	ABC	Dumont
The Wendy Barrie Show	ABC	Dumont
The Morey Amsterdam Show	CBS	Dumont
The Armed Forces Hour	NBC	Dumont
The Ted Steele Show	NBC	Dumont
Okay, Mother	WABD	Dumont

=== Ending this year ===
Date	Show	Network	Debut	Notes
January 10	Champagne and Orchids	DuMont	September 6, 1948	
January 14	Tales of the Red Caboose	DuMont	October 29, 1948	
March 4	Café de Paris	DuMont	January 17, 1949	
March 4	These Are My Children	NBC	January 31, 1949	
March 5	Quizzing the News	ABC	August 11, 1948	
March 7	Photographic Horizons	DuMont	January 12, 1949	
March 17	Hotel Broadway	DuMont	January 20, 1949	
April 14	Window on the World	DuMont	January 27, 1949	
April 19	The School House	DuMont	January 18, 1949	
April 22	Stop Me If You've Heard This One	NBC	March 4, 1948	
May 24	Places Please	CBS	August 16, 1948	
May 26	The Adventures of Oky Doky	DuMont	November 4, 1948	
June 3	Admiral Broadway Revue	NBC/DuMont	January 28, 1949	
June 23	King Cole's Birthday Party	DuMont	May 15, 1947	
June 23	Charade Quiz	DuMont	November 27, 1947	
July 4	Americana	NBC	December 8, 1947	
July 4	Doorway to Fame	DuMont	May 2, 1947	
July 5	Teen Time Tunes	DuMont	March 7, 1949	
July 15	A Woman to Remember	DuMont	February 21, 1949	
July 15	Your Show Time	NBC	January 21, 1949	
July 23	Television Screen Magazine	NBC	November 17, 1946	
August 3	The Growing Paynes	DuMont	October 20, 1948	
August 23	Talent Jackpot	DuMont	July 13, 1949	
August 27	Stand By for Crime	ABC	January 11, 1949	
August 30	Wesley	CBS	May 8, 1949	
September 10	For Your Pleasure	NBC	April 15, 1948	
September 12	Academy Theatre	NBC	July 25, 1949	
September 14	Program Playhouse	DuMont	June 22, 1949	
September 22	Flight to Rhythm	DuMont	March 10, 1949	
September 23	Key to the Missing	DuMont	July 4, 1948	
September 30	The Family Genius	DuMont	September 9, 1949	
October 16	Stained Glass Windows	ABC	September 26, 1948	
October 20	Uptown Jubilee	CBS	September 13, 1949	
October 27	Crusade in Europe	ABC	May 5, 1949	
October 27	Fireball Fun for All	NBC	June 28, 1949	
October 30	ABC Television Players	ABC	January 16, 1949	
November	Cinema Varieties	DuMont	September	
November 4	Oboler Comedy Theater	ABC	September 23, 1949	
November 14	ABC Barn Dance	ABC	February 21, 1949	
November 27	Let There Be Stars	ABC	October 16, 1949	
December	The Roar of the Rails	CBS	October 26, 1948	
December 14	Photocrime	ABC	September 28, 1949	
December 15	Starring Boris Karloff	ABC	September 21, 1949	
December 15	Tonight on Broadway	CBS	April 6, 1948	
December 28	The Crisis	NBC	October 5, 1949	
December 29	Romance	CBS	November 3, 1949	
Unknown date	Boxing From Jamaica Arena	DuMont	1946	
Unknown date	See What You Know	CBS	1946	
Unknown date	Musical Merry-Go-Round	NBC	July 25, 1947	
Unknown date	Amanda	DuMont	November 1, 1948	
Unknown date	Missus Goes a Shopping	CBS	November 19, 1947	

== Television stations ==
=== Station launches ===
Date	City of License/Market	Station	Channel	Affiliation	Notes/Ref.
January 1	Houston, Texas	KLEE-TV	2	NBC (primary); ABC/CBS/DuMont (secondary)	
January 1	Los Angeles, California	KTTV	11	CBS	Now a FOX affiliate since 1986
January 11	Pittsburgh, Pennsylvania	WDTV	3 (now 2)	DuMont (primary); NBC/ABC (secondary)	Eventually became CBS affiliate KDKA, now a CBS O&O station branded as CBS Pittsburgh
January 16	Los Angeles, California	KNBH	4	NBC (O&O)	
January 16	Washington, D.C.	WOIC	9	CBS	
February 23	Dayton, Ohio	WHIO-TV	7	CBS (primary); DuMont (secondary)	
March 8	Atlanta, Georgia	WAGA-TV	5	CBS	
March 15	Dayton, Ohio	WLWD	5 (now 2)	NBC (primary); DuMont (secondary)	
March 15	Erie, Pennsylvania	WICU-TV	12	NBC (primary); ABC/CBS/DuMont (secondary)	
March 18	Lancaster/Harrisburg, Pennsylvania	WGAL	4 (now 8)	NBC (primary); ABC/CBS/DuMont (secondary)	
March 21	Miami, Florida	WTVJ	4	CBS	Now an NBC affiliate on channel 6
March 25	Wilmington, Delaware	WVUE	12	NBC (primary); DuMont (secondary)	First licensed television station in Delaware
April 3	Columbus, Ohio	WLWC	4	NBC	
April 4	Cincinnati, Ohio	WKRC-TV	11 (now 12)	CBS	
May 5	San Francisco, California	KGO-TV	7	ABC	
May 18	San Diego, California	KFMB-TV	8	CBS (primary); NBC/DuMont (secondary)	
May 29	Birmingham, Alabama	WAFM-TV	13	CBS	
May 30	Indianapolis, Indiana	WFBM-TV	6	CBS (primary); Paramount/DuMont (secondary)	
June 1	Salt Lake City, Utah	KSL-TV	5	CBS (primary); ABC/DuMont (secondary)	
June 6	Oklahoma City, Oklahoma	WKY-TV	4	NBC (primary); CBS/ABC/DuMont (secondary)	
June 11	Rochester, New York	WHAM-TV	8	NBC (primary); DuMont (secondary)	
July 1	Birmingham, Alabama	WBRC-TV	4 (moved to 6 in 1953)	NBC	
July 1	Minneapolis, Minnesota	WTCN-TV	4	CBS (primary); ABC (secondary)	
July 10	Providence, Rhode Island	WJAR	11	NBC (primary); CBS/ABC/DuMont (secondary)	
July 15	Charlotte, North Carolina	WBTV	3	CBS (primary); NBC/ABC/DuMont (secondary)	
July 26	Cincinnati, Ohio	WCPO-TV	7 (now 9)	ABC	
August 15	Grand Rapids, Michigan	WLAV-TV	8	NBC (primary); CBS/ABC/DuMont (secondary)	
August 29	Omaha, Nebraska	WOW-TV	6	CBS	
September 1	Lincoln, Nebraska	KMTV	3	NBC	
September 15	Jacksonville, Florida	WMBR-TV	4	CBS (primary); ABC/NBC (secondary)	
September 15	Johnstown/Altoona, Pennsylvania	WJAC-TV	13 (now 6)	NBC (primary); ABC/CBS/DuMont (secondary)	
September 16	Los Angeles, California	KECA-TV	7	ABC	
September 17	Dallas, Texas	KBTV	8	DuMont	
September 22	Greensboro, North Carolina	WFMY-TV	2	CBS (primary); ABC/NBC/DuMont (secondary)	
September 29	Columbus, Ohio	WTVN-TV	6	DuMont (primary); ABC (secondary)	
September 30	Indianapolis, Indiana	WFBM-TV	6	CBS (primary); DuMont/Paramount (secondary)	
October 5	Columbus, Ohio	WBNS-TV	10	CBS	
October 11	Secaucus, New Jersey/New York City, New York	WOR-TV	9	Independent	
October 16	Kansas City, MO/KS	WDAF-TV	4	NBC (primary); CBS/ABC/DuMont (secondary)	
October 22	Tulsa, Oklahoma	KOTV	6	CBS (primary); ABC/DuMont/NBC/Paramount (secondary)	
October 31	Davenport, Iowa (Bettendorf, IA/Moline/Rock Island, IL)	WOC-TV	5 (now 6)	NBC (primary); CBS/ABC/DuMont (secondary)	
November 11	Bloomington/Indianapolis, Indiana	WTTV	10 (now 4)	NBC (primary); ABC/DuMont (Secondary)	
November 15	Huntington/Charleston, West Virginia (Ashland, Kentucky)	WSAZ-TV	5 (now 3)	NBC (primary); CBS/ABC/DuMont (Secondary)	
November 15	San Francisco, California	KRON-TV	4	NBC	
December 1	Binghamton, New York	WNBF-TV	12	CBS (primary); ABC/NBC/DuMont (secondary)	
December 1	Utica, New York	WKTV	2	NBC (primary); ABC/CBS/DuMont (secondary)	
December 3	Dallas, Texas	KRLD-TV	4	CBS	
December 4	Phoenix, Arizona	KPHO	5	CBS (primary); ABC/DuMont/NBC (secondary)	
December 11	San Antonio, Texas	WOAI-TV	4	NBC (primary); CBS/DuMont/ABC (secondary)	
December 19	Cleveland, Ohio	WXEL	9 (now 8)	DuMont (primary); ABC (secondary)	
December 29	Bridgeport, Connecticut	KC2XAK	24	NBC	World's first-ever UHF experimental station, serving as a rebroadcaster of WNBT from New York City

=== Network affiliation changes ===
Date	City of license/Market	Station	Channel	Old affiliation	New affiliation	Notes/Ref.
January	Buffalo, New York	WBEN-TV	4	NBC (primary); ABC/DuMont (secondary)	CBS (primary); ABC/DuMont/NBC (secondary)	Retains secondary NBC affiliation until 1954, and secondary ABC and DuMont affiliations until 1956
