= 1949–50 United States network television schedule =

The 1949–50 network television schedule for the four major English language commercial broadcast networks in the United States. The schedule covers primetime hours from September 1949 through March 1950. The schedule is followed by a list per network of returning series, new series, and series cancelled after the 1948–49 season. This was the first season in which all four networks offered at least some prime time programming all seven nights of the week.

The schedule below reflects the fall lineup as it all settled into place throughout October 1949, before any subsequent time changes were made and additional new series appeared in November.

New series are highlighted in bold.

Notable debuts during the season included The Plainclothesman with its unusual camera work, the popular The Lone Ranger (which is one of the few 1940s television series to be given a DVD release), The Ed Wynn Show (a short-lived series featuring popular performers as guests and the first variety show from the West Coast), and the unsuccessful series The Life of Riley, one of the first sitcoms to be produced on film as opposed to live transmission. Continuing from the prior season were the highly popular variety series Toast of the Town, the critically well-received and popular anthology series Studio One, the critically panned but popular Captain Video and His Video Rangers which was one of the earliest sci-fi TV series, the well received by critics and viewers anthology series Kraft Television Theater, the popular Kukla, Fran and Ollie, and the popular in some regions drama/comedy The Goldbergs (which is also one of the few 1940s television series to be given a DVD release).

== Legend ==
- Light blue indicates local programming.
- Blue-gray indicates news programming.
- Light green indicates sporting events.
- Light purple indicates movies.

=== Sunday ===
Network		7:00 p.m.	7:30 p.m.	8:00 p.m.	8:30 p.m.	9:00 p.m.	9:30 p.m.	10:00 p.m.	10:30 p.m.
ABC		Stained Glass Windows	ABC Penthouse Players	Think Fast	**The Little Revue**	**Let There Be Stars**		Celebrity Time	**Youth on the March**
CBS	Fall	Tonight on Broadway	This Is Show Business	Toast of the Town		The Fred Waring Show		The Week in Review (10:00) / Local Programming (10:15)	Local Programming
CBS	Spring	**Starlight Theatre**	This Is Show Business	Toast of the Town		The Fred Waring Show		The Week in Review (10:00) / Local Programming (10:15)	Local Programming
CBS	Summer	**Starlight Theatre**	This Is Show Business	Toast of the Town		**The Robert Q. Lewis Show** (9:00–9:15)		The Week in Review (10:00) / Local Programming (10:15)	Local Programming
DMN		Front Row Center		**Chicagoland Mystery Players**	**Cinema Varieties**	Cross Question		Local Programming	
NBC		Leave It to the Girls	**The Aldrich Family**	The Chesterfield Supper Club	Colgate Theatre	The Philco Television Playhouse		Garroway at Large	Local Programming

=== Monday ===
Network	7:00 p.m.	7:30 p.m.	8:00 p.m.	8:30 p.m.	9:00 p.m.	9:30 p.m.	10:00 p.m.	10:30 p.m.
ABC	News and Views (7:00) / Club Seven (7:15)	Author Meets the Critics	**Your Witness**	Photoplay Time	ABC Barn Dance	**Mr. Black**	Roller Derby	
CBS	The Roar of the Rails (7:00) / **The Paul Arnold Show** (7:15)	CBS Television News (7:30) / The Sonny Kendis Show (7:45) / Ruthie on the Telephone (7:55)	**The Silver Theatre**	Arthur Godfrey's Talent Scouts	**The Black Robe**	The Goldbergs	Studio One	
DMN	Captain Video and His Video Rangers	The Vincent Lopez Show (7:30) / Manhattan Spotlight (7:45)	Newsweek Views the News	**The Al Morgan Show**	**And Everything Nice**	**Wrestling From Sunnyside Gardens**		
NBC	Kukla, Fran and Ollie	Mohawk Showroom (7:30) / Camel News Caravan (7:45)	Chevrolet Tele-Theater	**The Voice of Firestone**	Candid Camera	**Cities Service Band of America**	Quiz Kids	Local Programming

Notes: Beginning July 18, 1949, The Magic Cottage aired on DuMont Monday through Friday from 6:30 to 7:00 p.m. Eastern Time.

On NBC, The Black Robe aired at various times on Mondays from August through October 1949.

=== Tuesday ===
Network		7:00 p.m.	7:30 p.m.	8:00 p.m.	8:30 p.m.	9:00 p.m.	9:30 p.m.	10:00 p.m.	10:30 p.m.
ABC		News and Views (7:00) / Club Seven (7:15)	On Trial	Local Programming		**Oboler Comedy Theater**	Local Programming	Tomorrow's Boxing Champions	
CBS	Fall	Your Sports Special (7:00) / Local Programming (7:15)	CBS Television News (7:30) / The Sonny Kendis Show (7:45) / Ruthie on the Telephone (7:55)	**Uptown Jubilee**		Local Programming	Suspense	**The Week in Sports** (10:00) / Local Programming (10:15)	Local Programming
CBS	November	Your Sports Special (7:00) / Local Programming (7:15)	CBS Television News (7:30) / The Sonny Kendis Show (7:45) / Ruthie on the Telephone (7:55)	**Uptown Jubilee**		Actors Studio	Suspense	**The Week in Sports** (10:00) / Local Programming (10:15)	Local Programming
DMN		Captain Video and His Video Rangers	The Vincent Lopez Show (7:30) / Manhattan Spotlight (7:45)	Court of Current Issues		**The O'Neills**	Feature Theater		Local Programming
NBC		Kukla, Fran and Ollie	Mohawk Showroom (7:30) / Camel News Caravan (7:45)	Texaco Star Theater		Fireside Theater	**The Life of Riley**	The Original Amateur Hour	

Notes: Beginning July 18, 1949, The Magic Cottage aired on DuMont Monday through Friday from 6:30 to 7:00 p.m. Eastern Time.

=== Wednesday ===
Network		7:00 p.m.	7:30 p.m.	8:00 p.m.	8:30 p.m.	9:00 p.m.	9:30 p.m.	10:00 p.m.	10:30 p.m.
ABC	Fall	News and Views (7:00) / Club Seven (7:15)	Local Programming	Actors Studio (through October)	**Photocrime**	Local Programming	Wrestling from the Rainbo in Chicago		
ABC	October	News and Views (7:00) / Club Seven (7:15)	Local Programming		**Photocrime**	Local Programming	Wrestling from the Rainbo in Chicago		
CBS		Your Sports Special (7:00) / **The Paul Arnold Show** (7:15)	CBS Television News (7:30) / Earl Wrightson at Home (7:45)	Arthur Godfrey and His Friends		The Bigelow Show	International Boxing Club Bouts		
DMN	Fall	Captain Video and His Video Rangers	The Vincent Lopez Show (7:30) / Manhattan Spotlight* (7:45)	Local Programming		**The Plainclothesman**	**Famous Jury Trials**	Local Programming	
DMN	December	Captain Video and His Video Rangers	The Vincent Lopez Show (7:30) / **Easy Aces** (7:45)	Local Programming		**The Plainclothesman**	**Famous Jury Trials**	Local Programming	
DMN	Summer	Captain Video and His Video Rangers	The Vincent Lopez Show (7:30) / Manhattan Spotlight (7:45)	Local Programming		**The Plainclothesman**	**Famous Jury Trials**	Local Programming	
NBC		Kukla, Fran and Ollie	Mohawk Showroom (7:30) / Camel News Caravan (7:45)	**The Crisis**	The Clock	Kraft Television Theater	Break the Bank	Local Programming	

- Manhattan Spotlight was replaced by Easy Aces from December 1949 to June 1950.

Notes: Beginning July 18, 1949, The Magic Cottage aired on DuMont Monday through Friday from 6:30 to 7:00 p.m. Eastern Time.

=== Thursday ===
Network		7:00 p.m.	7:30 p.m.	8:00 p.m.	8:30 p.m.	9:00 p.m.	9:30 p.m.	10:00 p.m.	10:30 p.m.
ABC	Fall	News and Views (7:00) / Club Seven (7:15)	**The Lone Ranger**	Stop the Music		Crusade in Europe	**Starring Boris Karloff**	Roller Derby	
ABC	Spring	News and Views (7:00) / Club Seven (7:15)	**The Lone Ranger**	Stop the Music		Blind Date	**Starring Boris Karloff**	Roller Derby	
ABC	Summer	News and Views (7:00) / Club Seven (7:15)	**The Lone Ranger**	Stop the Music			Blind Date	Roller Derby	
CBS		To the Queen's Taste	CBS Television News (7:30) / The Sonny Kendis Show (7:45) / Ruthie on the Telephone (7:55)	**The Front Page**	**Inside U.S.A. with Chevrolet**	**The Ed Wynn Show**	Local Programming		
DMN		Captain Video and His Video Rangers	The Vincent Lopez Show (7:30) / Manhattan Spotlight (7:45)	**Mystery Theater**		The Morey Amsterdam Show	**Boxing From Sunnyside Gardens**		
NBC	Fall	Kukla, Fran and Ollie	Mohawk Showroom (7:30) / Camel News Caravan (7:45)	Hollywood Premiere	Mary Kay and Johnny	Fireball Fun-For-All		**Martin Kane, Private Eye**	The Wayne King Show
NBC	Winter	Kukla, Fran and Ollie	Mohawk Showroom (7:30) / Camel News Caravan (7:45)	The Black Robe	Mary Kay and Johnny	Fireball Fun-For-All		**Martin Kane, Private Eye**	The Wayne King Show

Notes: Beginning July 18, 1949, The Magic Cottage aired on DuMont Monday through Friday from 6:30 to 7:00 p.m. Eastern Time.

On NBC, The Black Robe aired from 8:00 to 8:30 p.m. Eastern Time from January to March 1950. The Wayne King Show was seen only on NBC's Midwest Network.

=== Friday ===
Network		7:00 p.m.	7:30 p.m.	8:00 p.m.	8:30 p.m.	9:00 p.m.	9:30 p.m.	10:00 p.m.	10:30 p.m.
ABC	Fall	News and Views (7:00) / Club Seven (7:15)	Local Programming	**Majority Rules**	Blind Date	**Auction-Aire**	Fun for the Money	Roller Derby	
ABC	Spring	News and Views (7:00) / Club Seven (7:15)	Local Programming	**Majority Rules**		**Auction-Aire**	Fun for the Money	Roller Derby	
CBS		Your Sports Special (7:00) / **The Paul Arnold Show** (7:15)	CBS Television News (7:30) / The Sonny Kendis Show (7:45) / Ruthie on the Telephone (7:55)	Mama	**Man Against Crime**	Ford Theatre / 54th Street Revue		People's Platform	**Capitol Cloak Room**
DMN		Captain Video and His Video Rangers	The Vincent Lopez Show (7:30) / Manhattan Spotlight (7:45)	**Hands of Murder**	Broadway to Hollywood – Headline Clues	**Fishing and Hunting Club**	Local Programming	**Amateur Boxing Fight Club**	
NBC		Kukla, Fran and Ollie	Mohawk Showroom (7:30) / Camel News Caravan (7:45)	Hopalong Cassidy		**Bonny Maid Versatile Varieties**	**The Big Story**	Gillette Cavalcade of Sports (10:00) / Greatest Fights of the Century (10:45)	

Notes: Beginning July 18, 1949, The Magic Cottage aired on DuMont Monday through Friday from 6:30 to 7:00 p.m. Eastern Time.

=== Saturday ===
Network		7:00 p.m.	7:30 p.m.	8:00 p.m.	8:30 p.m.	9:00 p.m.	9:30 p.m.	10:00 p.m.	10:30 p.m.
ABC		News and Views (7:00) / Local Programming (7:15)	Hollywood Screen Test	Paul Whiteman's TV Teen Club		Local Programming			
CBS	Fall	Lucky Pup (6:45) / Local Programming (7:15)	In the First Person (7:30) / Blues by Bargy (7:45) / Ruthie on the Telephone (7:55)	Local Programming		Premiere Playhouse		Local Programming	
CBS	Spring	Lucky Pup (6:45) / Blues by Bargy (7:15)	In the First Person (7:30) / Ruthie on the Telephone (7:55)	Local Programming		Premiere Playhouse		Local Programming	
CBS	Summer	**Big Top**		Local Programming		Premiere Playhouse		Local Programming	
DMN	Fall	Captain Video and His Video Rangers	Local Programming	Spin the Picture		Cavalcade of Stars		**Wrestling From Marigold**	
DMN	Winter	Captain Video and His Video Rangers	Local Programming	Dinner Date With Vincent Lopez	Local Programming	Cavalcade of Stars		**Wrestling From Marigold**	
NBC	Fall	Local Programming	The Nature of Things (7:30) / Leon Pearson and the News (7:45)	Meet Your Congress	Mixed Doubles	Who Said That?	Meet the Press	Local Programming	
NBC	November	Local Programming	The Nature of Things (7:30) / Leon Pearson and the News (7:45)	Meet Your Congress	Mixed Doubles	Who Said That?	Meet the Press	The Black Robe	Local Programming
NBC	February	Local Programming	The Nature of Things (7:30) / Leon Pearson and the News (7:45)	Meet Your Congress	Mixed Doubles	**Your Show of Shows**			The Black Robe
NBC	April	Local Programming	The Nature of Things (7:30) / Leon Pearson and the News (7:45)	Meet Your Congress	Mixed Doubles	**Your Show of Shows**			Local Programming

Notes: In the half-hour preceding prime time, ABC aired one of the first television westerns, The Marshal of Gunsight Pass, with 22 live episodes between March 12 and September 30, 1950.

From January 28 to July 29, 1950, Dinner Date With Vincent Lopez aired Saturdays from 8 to 8:30pm ET on DuMont.

On NBC, The Black Robe aired from 10:00 to 10:30 p.m. on Saturday from November to December 1949 after airing at various times on Monday from August to October 1949. Your Show of Shows premiered at 9:00 p.m. ET on Saturday, February 25, 1950.

== By network ==
=== ABC ===
**Returning Series**

- ABC Barn Dance
- ABC Penthouse Players
- Actors Studio
- Author Meets the Critics
- Blind Date
- Buzzy Wuzzy
- Celebrity Time
- Club Seven
- Crusade in Europe
- Fun for the Money
- Hollywood Screen Test
- News and Views
- On Trial
- Paul Whiteman's TV Teen Club
- Photoplay Time
- Roller Derby
- Stained Glass Windows
- Think Fast
- Tomorrow's Boxing Champions
- Versatile Varieties
- The Voice of Firestone
- You Asked For It

**New Series**

- **Auction-Aire**
- **The Boris Karloff Mystery Playhouse**
- **Buck Rogers** *
- **Let There Be Stars**
- **The Little Revue**
- **The Lone Ranger**
- **Majority Rules**
- **Mr. Black**
- **Mysteries of Chinatown** *
- **Oboler Comedy Theater**
- **Paul Whiteman's Goodyear Revue**
- **Photocrime**
- **The Ruggles**
- **Starring Boris Karloff**
- **Volume One** *
- **Your Witness**
- **Youth on the March**
- **Wrestling from the Rainbo in Chicago**

Not returning from 1948–49:

- ABC Feature Film
- America's Town Meeting
- Critic at Large
- Fashions on Parade
- The Gay Nineties Revue
- Kiernan's Corner
- Movieland Quiz
- Quizzing the News
- The Southernaires Quartet
- Sports with Joe Hasel
- Stand By for Crime
- Tales of the Red Caboose
- Teenage Book Club
- That Reminds Me
- Three About Town
- Wrestling from Washington, D.C.

=== CBS ===
**Returning Series**

- 54th Street Revue
- Actors Studio (moved from ABC)
- Arthur Godfrey and His Friends
- Arthur Godfrey's Talent Scouts
- The Bigelow Show
- CBS Television News
- Earl Wrightson at Home
- The Fred Waring Show
- Ford Theatre
- The Goldbergs
- In the First Person
- International Boxing Club Bouts
- Lamp Unto My Feet
- Lucky Pup
- Mama
- Our Miss Brooks
- People's Platform
- Premiere Playhouse
- The Roar of the Rails
- Ruthie on the Telephone
- The Sonny Kendis Show
- Studio One
- Suspense
- The Ted Steele Show (moved from DuMont)
- This is Show Business
- Toast of the Town
- To the Queen's Taste
- Tonight on Broadway
- The Week in Review
- Your Sports Special

**New Series**

- **Abe Burrows' Almanac** *
- **The Alan Young Show**
- **Big Top** *
- **The Bigelow Show**
- **Capitol Cloak Room**
- **Detective's Wife** *
- **The Ed Wynn Show**
- **Escape** *
- **The Front Page**
- **The Garry Moore Show** *
- **Inside U.S.A. with Chevrolet**
- **Joey Faye's Frolics** *
- **The Ken Murray Show** *
- **Man Against Crime**
- **The Paul Arnold Show**
- **Romance**
- **The Show Goes On** *
- **The Silver Theatre**
- **Stage 13** *
- **The Stage Door** *
- **Starlight Theatre** *
- **Television Theatre** *
- **The Trap** *
- **Uptown Jubilee**
- **The Web** *
- **The Week in Sports**

Not returning from 1948–49:

- Adventures in Jazz
- The Dennis James Carnival
- Capital Billy's Mississippi Music Hall
- Kobbs' Korner
- Face the Music
- People's Platform
- Places Please
- Sportman's Quiz
- Tournament of Champions
- Wesley
- What's It Worth

=== DuMont ===
**Returning series**

- And Everything Nice
- Bowling Headliners (moved from ABC)
- Broadway to Hollywood
- Captain Video and His Video Rangers
- Cavalcade of Stars
- Court of Current Issues
- Cross Question
- Feature Theater
- Front Row Center
- Johnny Olson's Rumpus Room
- The Magic Cottage
- Manhattan Spotlight
- The Morey Amsterdam Show (moved from CBS)
- Newsweek Views the News
- Spin the Picture
- The Vincent Lopez Show

**New series**

- **Adventure Playhouse** *
- **The Al Morgan Show**
- **Amanda**
- **Amateur Boxing Fight Club**
- **And Everything Nice**
- **Cavalcade of Bands** *
- **Chicagoland Mystery Players**
- **Cinema Varieties**
- **Country Style** *
- **Dinner Date with Vincent Lopez** *
- **Easy Aces**
- **The Family Genius**
- **Famous Jury Trials**
- **Fishing and Hunting Club**
- **Georgetown University Forum** *
- **Hands of Mystery**
- **The Hazel Scott Show** *
- **Mystery Theater**
- **The O'Neills**
- **Okay, Mother**
- **The Plainclothesman**
- **Rocky King Detective** *
- **Starlit Time** *
- **Visit with the Armed Forces** *
- **Windy City Jamboree** *
- **Wrestling From Marigold**

Not returning from 1948–49:

- Admiral Broadway Revue
- The Adventures of Oky Doky
- The Alan Dale Show
- Boxing From Jamaica Arena
- Café de Paris
- Camera Headlines
- Champagne and Orchids
- Charade Quiz
- Doorway to Fame
- The Growing Paynes
- Hotel Broadway
- I.N.S. Telenews
- The Jack Eigen Show
- Key to the Missing
- King Cole's Birthday Party
- The Laytons
- Operation Success
- The School House
- Spin the Picture
- The Stan Shaw Show
- Teen Time Tunes
- Window on the World
- Wrestling From Columbia Park Arena

=== NBC ===
**Returning Series**

- The Black Robe
- Break the Bank
- Candid Camera (moved from ABC)
- Camel News Caravan
- The Chesterfield Supper Club
- Chevrolet Tele-Theater
- The Clock
- Colgate Theatre
- Duffy's Tavern
- Fireball-Fun-For-All
- Fireside Theatre
- Garroway at Large
- Gillette Cavalcade of Sports
- Greatest Fights of the Century
- Hollywood Premiere
- Hopalong Cassidy
- Kraft Television Theatre
- Kukla, Fran and Ollie
- Leave It to the Girls
- Leon Pearson and the News
- Mary Kay and Johnny
- Meet the Press
- Meet Your Congress
- Mixed Doubles
- Mohawk Showroom
- The Nature of Things
- The Original Amateur Hour (moved from DuMont)
- The Philco Television Playhouse
- Quiz Kids
- Texaco Star Theater
- The Wayne King Show
- We, the People
- Who Said That?

**New Series**

- **The Armed Forces Hour**
- **Armstrong Circle Theatre** *
- **The Big Story**
- **Bonny Maid Versatile Varieties**
- **Cameo Theatre** *
- **The Crisis**
- **The Halls of Ivy** *
- **Hawkins Falls, Population 6200**
- **Leave It to the Girls**
- **The Life of Riley**
- **The Marshal of Gunsight Pass**
- **Martin Kane, Private Eye**
- **Mary Kay and Johnny**
- **Masterpiece Playhouse** *
- **Screen Directors Playhouse**
- **Theatre of the Mind** *
- **The Voice of Firestone**
- **Your Show of Shows** *

Not returning from 1948–49:

- Admiral Broadway Revue
- America Song
- Americana
- The Bigelow Show
- Girl About Town
- Girl of the Week
- The Gulf Road Show Starring Bob Smith
- The Hartmans
- Mary Margaret McBride
- Musical Merry-Go-Round
- Musical Miniatures
- NBC Presents
- Picture This
- Princess Sagaphi
- Saturday Night Jamboree
- Stop Me If You've Heard This One
- The Swift Show
- The Ted Steele Show
- Television Screen Magazine
- Theatre of the Mind
- Village Barn
- Admiral Presents the Five Star Revue — Welcome Aboard
- You Are an Artist
- Your Show Time

Note: The * indicates that the program was introduced in midseason.
