= 1949 in television =

The year 1949 in television involved some significant events. Below is a list of television-related events during 1949.

== Events ==
- January 3: Colgate Theatre premieres on NBC.
- January 11: A two-hour special on all American networks celebrates the linking of the eastern and midwestern networks via coaxial cable.
- January 20: The second inauguration of President Truman becomes the first presidential inauguration to be broadcast on television.
- January 21: Your Show Time becomes the first filmed dramatic series on American network television.
- January 31: The first Emmy Awards are presented and broadcast on television from Los Angeles.
- April 9: The first telethon, benefitting the Damon Runyon Cancer Fund, is hosted by Milton Berle and lasts for 24 hours. The first published appearance of the word "telethon" was in the prior day's newspapers.
- May 30: WRTV-DT (Channel 6) signs on as WFBM-TV in Indianapolis, the first television station in the state of Indiana. Its first aired program was the documentary The Crucible of Speed, about the early history of the Indianapolis 500, followed by the inaugural live television coverage of the event.
- August 25: RCA announces the development of a compatible color TV system.
- December 17: The Sutton Coldfield television transmitter is opened in the English Midlands, making it the first part of the UK outside London to receive BBC Television.
- December 29: KC2XAK of Bridgeport, Connecticut becomes the first Ultra high frequency (UHF) television station to operate a daily schedule.
- First television broadcasts begin in Cuba.
- For the first time, the Sears & Roebuck catalog includes televisions.

== Debuts ==
=== Programs ===
- January 16: ABC Television Players, a dramatic anthology, debuts on ABC (1949).
- January 17: The Goldbergs, a situation comedy, debuts on CBS (1949–55).
- March 1: Ripley's Believe It or Not debuts on NBC (1949–1950)
- April 24: Action Autographs debuts on ABC (1949–1950).
- May 5: Series Stop the Music debuts on American Broadcasting Company for a five-year run over seven years.
- June 24: "Hopalong Cassidy" becomes the first American television Western series (originally based on film shorts, then becoming an original series in 1952)
- June 27: Captain Video and His Video Rangers, apparently the first science fiction series televised, debuts.
- July 15: This Is Show Business, panel discussion program, premieres on CBS (1949–54; 1956).
- September 16: The Big Story, a dramatic anthology, premieres on NBC (1949-1957)
- September 28: Photocrime, detective program, premieres on ABC (1949).
- September 29: Come Dancing, a ballroom dancing competition, is first broadcast by the BBC (1949–95).
- Martin Kane, Private Eye premieres on NBC, becoming the first detective series televised (1949–54).
- The Voice of Firestone premieres (1949–63).
- Bozo the Clown premieres (1949–present).
- The Lone Ranger premieres on ABC (1949–57).

=== Stations ===
- January 1: KPRC-TV (Originally known as KLEE-TV) Signs on the air. They are the Second TV station in Texas, and the First in Houston. That same day, KTTV signs on in Los Angeles.
- March 21: WTVJ signs on the air becoming the first television station in the state of Florida.
- May 29: WVTM-TV (Originally WAFM, and later WABT and WAPI) signs on the air as the first TV station in Alabama
- May 30: WRTV (originally WFBM-TV) signs on the air as the first TV station in Indiana
- June 6: KFOR-TV (originally WKY-TV) signs on the air as the first TV station in Oklahoma
- July 1 WBRC begins operations from Birmingham AL, just 1 month after WVTM started operations.
- August 29: WOWT (originally WOW-TV) signs on the air for the first time, becoming the first television station in Nebraska, and one of the first in the Midwest.

== Television shows ==
Picture Page (UK)	1946	1952
Starlight (UK)	1946	1949
For The Children (UK)	April 24, 1952	July 7, 1946
The Voice of Firestone Televues	1949	1963
Missus Goes A Shopping	August 1, 1944	1949
Kaleidoscope (UK)	November 2, 1946	1953
Gillette Cavalcade of Sports	November 8, 1946	June 24, 1960
Muffin the Mule (UK)	1946	1955
Television Screen Magazine	1946	1949
You Are an Artist	1946	1950
Doorway to Fame	May 2, 1947	July 4, 1949
Kraft Television Theater	May 7, 1947	1958
Kukla, Fran and Ollie	October 13, 1947	1957
Meet the Press	November 6, 1947	—
Mary Kay and Johnny	November 18, 1947	March 11, 1950
Howdy Doody	December 27, 1947	September 24, 1960
Americana	1947	1949
Birthday Party	1947	1949
Café Continental (UK)	1947	1953
Charade Quiz	1947	1949
Juvenile Jury	1947	1954
Musical Merry-Go-Round	1947	1949
Small Fry Club	1947	1951
Television Newsreel (UK)	January 5, 1948	1954
The Original Amateur Hour	January 18, 1948	September 27, 1970
Court of Current Issues	February 9, 1948	June 26, 1951
Stop Me If You've Heard This One	March 4, 1948	April 22, 1949
Author Meets the Critics	April 1948	October 10, 1954
Hollywood Screen Test	April 15, 1948	1953
Texaco Star Theater	June 8, 1948	1953
The Ed Sullivan Show	June 20, 1948	June 6, 1971
Candid Camera	August 10, 1948	—
CBS Evening News	August 15, 1948	—
Foodini the Great	August 23, 1948	June 23, 1951
Actors Studio	September 1948	June 1950
Champagne and Orchids	September 6, 1948	January 10, 1949
Stained Glass Windows	September 26, 1948	October 16, 1949
Ford Theatre	October 17, 1948	July 10, 1957
The Growing Paynes	October 20, 1948	August 3, 1949
The Adventures of Oky Doky	November 4, 1948	May 26, 1949
The Morey Amsterdam Show	December 17, 1948	October 12, 1950
The Alan Dale Show	1948	1951
Amanda	1948	1949
Arthur Godfrey's Talent Scouts	1948	January 1, 1958
The Bigelow Show	1948	1949
Break the Bank	1948	1957
Cartoon Teletales	1948	1950
Celebrity Time	1948	September 1952
Child's World	1948	1949
Club Seven	1948	1951
The Philco Television Playhouse	1948	1955
Winner Take All	1948	1952
The Goldbergs	January 17, 1949	1956
These Are My Children	January 31, 1949	February 25, 1949
A Woman to Remember	February 21, 1949	July 15, 1949
Time for Beany	February 28, 1949	1955
Ripley's Believe It or Not!	March 1, 1949	October 5, 1950
Think Fast	March 26, 1949	October 8, 1950
Captain Video	June 27, 1949	April 1, 1955
Mama	July 1, 1949	March 17, 1957
Martin Kane, Private Eye	August 7, 1949	June 17, 1954
The Family Genius	September 1949	September 1949
The Little Revue	September 4, 1949	April 21, 1950
The Lone Ranger	September 15, 1949	June 6, 1957
Come Dancing (UK)	September 29, 1949	1995
The Aldrich Family	October 2, 1949	May 29, 1953
The Life of Riley	October 4, 1949	March 28, 1950
The Life of Riley	January 2, 1953	August 22, 1958
Let There Be Stars	October 6, 1949	November 27, 1949
The Ruggles	November 3, 1949	June 19, 1952
One Man's Family	November 4, 1949	June 21, 1952
One Man's Family	March 1, 1954	April 1, 1955
The Admiral Broadway Revue	1949	1949
Arthur Godfrey and His Friends	1949	1959
Easy Aces	1949	1949
Follow That Man	1949	1956

== Programs ending during 1949 ==
Date	Show	Debut
January 10	Champagne and Orchids	1948
May 26	The Adventures of Oky Doky	1948
June 23	King Cole's Birthday Party	1947
June 23	Charade Quiz	1947
July 4	Americana	1947
July 4	Doorway to Fame	1947
Unknown	Musical Merry-Go-Round	1947
Unknown	Amanda	1948
Unknown	The Bigelow Show	1948
Unknown	Child's World	1948
Unknown	Missus Goes A-Shopping	1944
Unknown	Starlight (UK)	1946
Unknown	Television Screen Magazine	1946

== Changes of network affiliation ==
Show	Moved from	Moved to
Candid Camera	ABC	NBC

== Births ==
- January 7 – Steven Williams, American actor, (21 Jump Street)
- January 8 – Anne Schedeen, American actress, (ALF)
- January 13 – Brandon Tartikoff, American executive (died 1997)
- January 16 – Caroline Munro, English actress and model
- January 17 – Andy Kaufman, American actor and comedian (died 1984)
- January 24 – John Belushi, American actor and comedian, (Saturday Night Live) (died 1982)
- February 2 – Brent Spiner, American actor, (Star Trek: The Next Generation)
- February 3 – Brenda Dickson, American actress, (The Young and the Restless)
- February 8 – Brooke Adams, American actress
- February 9 – Judith Light, American actress, (One Life to Live, Who's The Boss?)
- February 14 – István Vágó, Hungarian television host and political activist (died 2023)
- February 18 – Jess Walton, American actress, (The Young and the Restless)
- February 25 – Ric Flair, American pro wrestler
- February 26 – Tim Brant, American sportscaster
- February 28 – Ilene Graff, American actress and singer, (Mr. Belvedere)
- March 2 – Gates McFadden, American actress and choreographer, (Star Trek: The Next Generation)
- March 16
  - Erik Estrada, American actor, (CHiPs)
  - Victor Garber, Canadian actor and singer, (Alias, Legends of Tomorrow)
- March 17 – Patrick Duffy, American actor, (Dallas, Step by Step)
- March 26
  - Vicki Lawrence, American actress and comedian, (The Carol Burnett Show, Mama's Family)
  - Ernest Lee Thomas, American actor, (What's Happening!!, What's Happening Now!!)
- April 14 – John Shea, American actor
- April 17 – Michael J. Stull, American songwriter (died 2002)
- April 19 – Forrest Sawyer, American broadcast journalist
- April 20 – Veronica Cartwright, English-born actress
- April 23 – Joyce DeWitt, American actress, (Three's Company)
- April 28 – Paul Guilfoyle, American actor, (CSI: Crime Scene Investigation)
- May 1 – Douglas Barr, actor, (The Fall Guy)
- May 9
  - Billy Joel, American singer-songwriter
  - Beverly Penberthy, actress (Another World)
- May 26
  - Jeremy Corbyn, British politician
  - Philip Michael Thomas, actor, (Miami Vice)
- June 3 – John Rothman, actor
- June 11 – Sherman Howard, actor, (Superboy, Jumanji, Batman Beyond)
- June 12 – Roger Aaron Brown, actor, (The District)
- June 15 – Jim Varney, actor and comedian (died 2000)
- June 16
  - Geoff Pierson, actor, (Ryan's Hope, Unhappily Ever After, Dexter)
  - Arnold Diaz, American television consumer watchdog journalist (died 2023)
- June 20 – Lionel Richie, singer
- June 22
  - Lindsay Wagner, actress, (The Bionic Woman)
  - Rand Morrison, producer
- June 25
  - Kene Holliday, actor, (Matlock)
  - Phyllis George, actress, (died 2020)
- July 3 – Jan Smithers, actress, (WKRP in Cincinnati)
- July 8 – Carmel Cryan, actor
- July 9 – Nigel Lythgoe, British TV director and producer (American Idol, So You Think You Can Dance)
- July 10 – Mark Shera, actor, (Barnaby Jones, S.W.A.T.)
- July 11 – Jay Johnson, ventriloquist, actor, (Soap)
- July 16 – Cyndy Garvey, American television personality
- July 24 – Michael Richards, actor, (Seinfeld)
- July 27 – Maureen McGovern, actress
- August 14 – Bob Backlund, American wrestler
- August 21
  - Loretta Devine, actress and singer, (Boston Public, Grey's Anatomy)
  - Josephine Abady, American stage director (died 2002)
- August 23
  - Rick Springfield, Australian singer-songwriter and actor
  - Shelley Long, actress, (Cheers)
- August 24
  - Joe Regalbuto, actor, (Murphy Brown)
  - Patricia Shevlin, producer
- August 25 – John Savage, actor, (Dark Angel)
- September 10
  - Bill O'Reilly, television journalist, host, (The O'Reilly Factor)
  - Tony Evans, television pastor
- September 16 – Ed Begley, Jr., actor, (St. Elsewhere)
- September 20 – Anthony Denison, actor
- September 23
  - Floella Benjamin, Trinidad-born British actress, children's TV presenter, (Play School)
  - Bruce Springsteen, American singer-songwriter
- September 25 – Anson Williams, actor and director, (Happy Days)
- September 28 – Vernee Watson-Johnson, actress
- September 30 – Ann Risley, actress and comedian, (Saturday Night Live)
- October 3 – Norm Abram, master carpenter, (This Old House)
- October 4 – Armand Assante, actor
- October 8 – Sigourney Weaver, actress
- October 9 – Shera Danese, actress, (Columbo)
- October 10 – Jessica Harper, actress
- October 14 – Katy Manning, English actress
- October 15 – Tanya Roberts, actress, (died 2021)
- October 21
  - LaTanya Richardson Jackson, actress
  - Benjamin Netanyahu, Israeli politician
- October 28
  - Caitlyn Jenner, American Olympic athlete and reality TV personality
  - Sandra Sade, Israeli actress (Sabri Maranan)
- November 1 – Belita Moreno, actress, (Perfect Strangers, George Lopez)
- November 3 – Mike Evans, actor, (All in the Family, The Jeffersons and creator of Good Times) (died 2006)
- November 4 – Berlinda Tolbert, actress, (The Jeffersons)
- November 5 – Armin Shimerman, actor, (Star Trek: Deep Space Nine, Buffy the Vampire Slayer)
- November 11 – Denise Gordy, actress
- November 17 – John Boehner, politician
- November 19 – Ahmad Rashad, Sportscaster and former NFL football player
- November 23 – Jerry verDorn, soap opera actor (Guiding Light, One Life to Live) (died 2022)
- November 24 – Damon Evans, actor, (The Jeffersons)
- November 28 – Paul Shaffer, singer
- November 29
  - Jerry Lawler, WWE commentator and pro wrestler
  - Garry Shandling, actor and comedian, (The Larry Sanders Show) (died 2016)
- December 2 – Ron Raines, American actor, (Guiding Light)
- December 3 – Heather Menzies, Canadian actress, (Logan's Run) (died 2017)
- December 4 – Pamela Stephenson, New Zealand actress and comedian
- December 5 – Lanny Wadkins, `American golfer
- December 12 – Moses Lim, Singaporean actor (died 1949)
- December 15 – Don Johnson, American actor, (Miami Vice, Nash Bridges)
- December 19 – Rita Taggart, American actress
- December 21 – Michael Horse, American actor, (Twin Peaks)
- December 25 - Sissy Spacek, American actress and singer

== Television debuts ==
- Andy Devine – Lum and Abner
- Brian Donlevy – The Chevrolet Tele-Theatre
- Melvyn Douglas – The Philco Television Playhouse
- Glenda Farrell – Studio One
- Miriam Hopkins – The Chevrolet Tele-Theatre
- Marcia Mae Jones – Your Show Time
- John Merton – The Lone Ranger
- Lee Tracy – The Chevrolet Tele-Theatre
