= Boxing from St. Nicholas Arena =

American sports program

- Genre: Sports
- Presented by: Chris Schenkel
- Country of origin: United States
- Original language: English

Production
- Camera setup: Multi-camera
- Running time: 60–90 mins.

Original release
- Network: NBC (1946–1948); DuMont (1954–1955); Syndicated, through WABD (1955–1958)
- Release: 1946 – August 4, 1958

Boxing from St. Nicholas Arena, sometimes named Monday Night Fights at St. Nicholas Arena, is an American sports television program originally broadcast on NBC from 1946 to 1948, and later on the DuMont Television Network from 1954 to the network's closure in 1956. It was DuMont's last regularly scheduled program. It was then a syndicated program based at WABD television in New York City (the former flagship of DuMont) from 1956 until 1958.

== Broadcast history ==
Before having their own program, boxing matches from St. Nicholas Arena were broadcast as part of the Gillette Cavalcade of Sports.

=== NBC ===
NBC broadcast Boxing From St. Nicholas Arena twice a week—at 9:30 p.m. on Mondays and at 10 p.m. on Tuesdays. The series ended on May 9, 1949, as a result of budgetary problems at the sponsoring Gillette Company.

=== DuMont ===
The DuMont version was hosted by Chris Schenkel; Schenkel took over for Dennis James, who had hosted most of DuMont's boxing telecasts prior to 1954.

This program, which aired boxing matches from St. Nicholas Arena in New York City on Monday nights, is notable for being the final program to air on DuMont. After a short period of significant decline, DuMont announced in April 1955 that all remaining scripted programming would end on a per-program basis, a process that wrapped up by September and effectively ended regular operations. Boxing From St. Nicholas Arena was the only regularly scheduled show to remain on the lineup, as it was a co-op production and not sponsored. Historians Tim Brooks and Earle Marsh write that DuMont's last official broadcast was a St. Nicholas Arena match on August 6, 1956. (Note: Journalist Steve Tober writes that DuMont syndicated a Thanksgiving game of high school football in 1957.)

=== WABD ===
St. Nicholas Arena was then syndicated from WABD (a former DuMont flagship, now Fox owned-and operated flagship WNYW), under the "DuMont" banner, to a network of 37 stations initially. Most were affiliates of ABC. It still aired it on Monday nights, a night ABC did not fully program into. When The Lawrence Welk Show moved to a later start time on ABC, it shifted the start time for St. Nicholas Arena by 30 minutes. WABD continued to distribute the program to a dwindling affiliate base until the program's last broadcast on August 4, 1958, after a price dispute between the station and promoter Teddy Brenner. The broadcast aired on only five affiliates. WABD opted to air feature films in the time slot instead.

== Episode status ==
About 60 episodes of the DuMont version survive at the UCLA Film and Television Archive. However, some of these episodes are from the non-network version which continued to run on WABD after the network closed (these are also notable due to the rarity of kinescopes of local programming aired on United States television stations during the 1950s).

== See also ==
- List of programs broadcast by the DuMont Television Network
- List of surviving DuMont Television Network broadcasts
- Boxing from Jamaica Arena (July 1940-May 1942, 1946-1949)
- Amateur Boxing Fight Club (September 1949 – 1950)
- Wrestling from Marigold (September 1949 – 1955)
- Boxing from Eastern Parkway (May 1952-May 1954)
- Saturday Night at the Garden (1950-1951)
- HBO Boxing (1973-2018)

== Bibliography ==
- David Weinstein, The Forgotten Network: DuMont and the Birth of American Television (Philadelphia: Temple University Press, 2004) ISBN 1-59213-245-6
- Alex McNeil, Total Television, Fourth edition (New York: Penguin Books, 1980) ISBN 0-14-024916-8
- Tim Brooks and Earle Marsh, The Complete Directory to Prime Time Network TV Shows, Third edition (New York: Ballantine Books, 1964) ISBN 0-345-31864-1
