= Theatre of the Mind =

Theatre of the Mind may refer to:

- Theatre of the Mind (Mystery album), a 1996 album by Mystery
- Theater of the Mind, a 2008 album by Ludacris
- Theatre of the Mind (TV series), a 1949 American television series
