= Sue Bennett =

American singer

Sue Bennett (born Sue Benjamin; March 24, 1928 – May 8, 2001) was a vocalist on various network shows during the live television era of the 1940s and 1950s.

The Indianapolis, Indiana-born Bennett majored in English at Syracuse University. She starred on the NBC quiz and variety show, Kay Kyser's College of Musical Knowledge in 1949–50, on the DuMont show Teen Time Tunes in 1949, and was featured on Your Hit Parade in 1951–52.

Bennett's recordings with the Kay Kyser Orchestra include "Sam, The Old Accordion Man," and "Tootsie, Darlin', Angel, Honey, Baby." She also is heard on the CD, An Evening with Frank Loesser (DRG 5169), singing "Fugue for Tinhorns" with Loesser and Milton DeLugg.

Her career is profiled in a book about the period of early television, The Lucky Strike Papers, written by her son, Andrew Lee Fielding (BearManor Media, 2007; Revised ed., 2019). Following her network career, she sang on an early morning radio program on WEEI in Boston and later had The Sue Bennett Show, a weekly musical program on Boston's WBZ-TV.

== Personal life and death ==
Bennett was married to Dr. Waldo Fielding, and they had two sons, Jed., and the aforementioned Andrew. She died on May 8, 2001, in Brookline, Massachusetts, aged 73.
