= Boxing from Jamaica Arena =

- Genre: Sports
- Presented by: Dennis James
- Country of origin: United States
- Original language: English

Production
- Running time: 90/120 minutes

Original release
- Network: DuMont
- Release: 1946 – 1949

Boxing from Jamaica Arena is a TV sports series broadcast by the DuMont Television Network from 1946 to 1949. The program aired boxing from Jamaica Arena in Queens, New York. The program aired on Monday and Wednesday nights at 9 pm ET and was 90 to 120 minutes long. An earlier program of the same name had aired on NBC from July 8, 1940 until May 18, 1942.

== Episode status ==
As with most DuMont series, no episodes are known to exist. Some episodes may exist under the umbrella title Boxing With Dennis James at the UCLA Film and Television Archive.

== See also ==
- List of programs broadcast by the DuMont Television Network
- List of surviving DuMont Television Network broadcasts
- 1948-49 United States network television schedule
- Amateur Boxing Fight Club (September 1949 – 1950)
- Wrestling From Marigold (September 1949 – 1955)
- Boxing from Eastern Parkway (May 1952-May 1954)
- Boxing from St. Nicholas Arena (1954-1956)
- Saturday Night at the Garden (1950-1951)

== Bibliography ==
- David Weinstein, The Forgotten Network: DuMont and the Birth of American Television (Philadelphia: Temple University Press, 2004) ISBN 1-59213-245-6
- Alex McNeil, Total Television, Fourth edition (New York: Penguin Books, 1980) ISBN 0-14-024916-8
- Tim Brooks and Earle Marsh, The Complete Directory to Prime Time Network TV Shows, Third edition (New York: Ballantine Books, 1964) ISBN 0-345-31864-1
