= Elder Michaux =

- Genre: Religion
- Created by: Jonathan Pierce
- Starring: Lightfoot Solomon Michaux
- Country of origin: United States
- Original language: English

Production
- Running time: 30 minutes

Original release
- Network: WTTG (1947-1951); DuMont (1948-1949)
- Release: October 17, 1948 – January 9, 1949

Elder Michaux is a religious TV show that aired on the DuMont Television Network, hosted by evangelist Lightfoot Solomon Michaux. The program combined both Michaux's preaching and singing by the Happy-Am-I gospel choir, consisting of thirty-five singers. During the broadcasts his congregation shouted out encouragement while Elder Michaux preached.

== Broadcast history ==
The 30-minute program was broadcast on Sundays from 6:00 to 6:30 p.m. It originated as a local program on DuMont station WTTG in Washington, D. C. in 1947, and aired on the DuMont network from October 17, 1948 to January 9, 1949. The show continued to be broadcast from WTTG's Washington studios through 1951.

The program was among the earliest U.S. television shows with an African American host, and included religious music and preaching.

== Episode status ==
As with most DuMont series, no episodes are known to survive.

== See also ==
- List of programs broadcast by the DuMont Television Network
- List of surviving DuMont Television Network broadcasts
- Stained Glass Windows (ABC Television, 1948–49)
- Lamp Unto My Feet (CBS Television, 1948–79)
- Religious broadcasting

== Bibliography ==
- David Weinstein, The Forgotten Network: DuMont and the Birth of American Television (Philadelphia: Temple University Press, 2004) ISBN 1-59213-245-6
- Alex McNeil, Total Television, Fourth edition (New York: Penguin Books, 1980) ISBN 0-14-024916-8
- Tim Brooks and Earle Marsh, The Complete Directory to Prime Time Network and Cable TV Shows 1946–Present, Ninth edition (New York: Ballantine Books, 2007) ISBN 978-0-345-49773-4
