= Ruthie on the Telephone =

- Genre: Comedy
- Starring: Ruth Gilbert; Phillip Reed
- Country of origin: United States
- Original language: English
- No. of seasons: 1

Production
- Camera setup: Single-camera
- Running time: 5 minutes

Original release
- Network: CBS Television
- Release: August 7 – November 5, 1949

Ruthie on the Telephone is an American comedy television series that was broadcast on the CBS Television network at 7:55 pm ET from August 7 to November 5, 1949.

The show was written by Goodman Ace and sponsored by Phillip Morris cigarettes. Each episode was only five minutes long. Ruthie on the Telephone was preceded by CBS Television News at 7:30 pm ET, and by The Sonny Kendis Show at 7:45 pm ET.

== Synopsis ==
The series features a young lady, Ruthie (Ruth Gilbert), trying to convince a man, Richard (Phillip Reed) to love her via a telephone call. The series used a split-screen technique to depict the telephone conversation.

== Reception ==
Billboard magazine called the show funny, and complimented the split-screen effect.

== See also ==
- 1949-50 United States network television schedule
