= The Front Page (TV series) =

American newspaper drama TV series (1949–1950)

- Created by: Franklin Heller
- Written by: Charles MacArthur (play); Ben Hecht (play); Alvin Saplinsley
- Starring: John Daly; Mark Roberts; Richard Boone; Curt Conway; Janet Shaw
- Country of origin: United States
- No. of seasons: 1
- No. of episodes: 18

Production
- Running time: 30 minutes

Original release
- Network: CBS Television
- Release: September 29, 1949 – January 26, 1950

The Front Page is an American newspaper drama television series, broadcast on CBS beginning September 29, 1949, and ending on January 26, 1950. The stars were John Daly and Mark Roberts, with Richard Boone, Curt Conway and Janet Shaw. The live 30-minute show, based on the 1928 play The Front Page by Charles MacArthur and Ben Hecht, aired Thursdays at 8pm ET.

== Premise ==
The series revolved around editor Walter Burns and his star reporter Hildy Johnson.

In the series premiere an assassination attempt has been made on the city's corrupt mayor. Hildy is on his honeymoon, so Burns compels him to come back and cover the story by kidnapping Hildy's mother-in-law. After a follow-up assassination plot is discovered and foiled, Burns keeps Hildy in town by getting the mayor to arrest Hildy.

== Cast ==
- John Daly as editor Walter Burns
- Mark Roberts as reporter Hildy Johnson
- Cliff Hall as Mayor Barber
- Leona Powers as Mrs. Grant
- Janet Shaw as Peggy Grant
- Florenz Ames as Sheriff Hartman

== Production ==
Donald Davis was the producer, Frank Heller was the director, and Alvin Sapinsley was the writer. The show originated from WCBS-TV.

== Critical response ==
A review of the premiere episode in The New York Times called Daly's role "serious miscasting" and said he "is in seriously over his head". The review explained that the newspaper's managing editor needed to have a "vivid personality" and be tough and ruthless. "Under such circumstances, Mr. Daly's sonorous and pear-shaped tones, coupled with an excessively suave and almost delicate interpretation, are completely out of character." Otherwise, it said the cast did well. It said that some situations in the episode were "wholly implausible", and that the scenes had little relation to actual events at newspapers.

== Preservation status ==
Three episodes are in the collection of the Paley Center for Media.

== See also ==
- 1949-50 United States network television schedule

== Bibliography ==
- Alex McNeil, Total Television, Fourth edition (New York: Penguin Books, 1980) ISBN 0-14-024916-8
- Tim Brooks and Earle Marsh, The Complete Directory to Prime Time Network TV Shows, Third edition (New York: Ballantine Books, 1985) ISBN 0-345-31864-1
