= Wrestling from Marigold =

- Genre: Professional wrestling
- Country of origin: United States
- Original language: English

Production
- Producer: Fred Kohler

Original release
- Network: WGN-TV; DuMont
- Release: 1949 – 1957

Wrestling from Marigold is an American professional wrestling television program produced by Fred Kohler. It originated from Marigold Gardens in Chicago and aired locally on WGN-TV. The DuMont Television Network carried the program from 1949 until 1955; WGN-TV continued its local broadcasts until 1957.

== Broadcast history ==
Kohler had previously brought wrestling to Chicago television in 1946. In 1949, he made a contract with DuMont that brought Wrestling from Marigold to a wider audience. A 1951 report stated that DuMont telecast the program live on Saturday nights from Marigold Gardens through WGN-TV. DuMont canceled the program in 1955, and WGN-TV ended its local broadcasts in 1957.

== See also ==
- List of programs broadcast by the DuMont Television Network
- List of surviving DuMont Television Network broadcasts
- 1949-50 United States network television schedule
- Boxing from Jamaica Arena (September 1948 – 1949)
- Amateur Boxing Fight Club (September 1949 – 1950)
- Boxing from Eastern Parkway (May 1952-May 1954)
- Boxing from St. Nicholas Arena (1954-1956), the last series to air on the DuMont network
- Saturday Night at the Garden (1950-1951)
