= Stained Glass Windows (TV program) =

- Genre: Religion
- Presented by: Rev. Everett C. Parker
- Country of origin: United States
- Original language: English

Production
- Running time: 30 minutes

Original release
- Network: ABC Television
- Release: September 26, 1948 – October 16, 1949

Stained Glass Windows is an early religious television program, broadcast on early Sunday evenings on the ABC Television network. The program was hosted by the Reverend Everett C. Parker.

== Broadcast history ==
The program ran from September 26, 1948 until October 16, 1949, and was a thirty-minute show. The program:

- originally ran from 6:30 to 7pm ET (September to December 1948)
- then 7:15-7:45 pm ET (January to March 1949)
- and, finally, 7:00-7:30pm ET (March to October 1949)

The program contained dramatizations, and discussions, of moral problems, and was the very first religious TV program on ABC.

== See also ==
- 1948-49 United States network television schedule
- 1949-50 United States network television schedule
- Elder Michaux (DuMont Television Network religious program, 1948)
- Lamp Unto My Feet (CBS Television, 1948-1979)

== Bibliography ==
- Tim Brooks and Earle Marsh, The Complete Directory to Prime Time Network and Cable TV Shows ISBN 0-345-45542-8
