= The Little Revue =

American TV variety series (1949–1950)

The Little Revue is an American television variety series that aired on ABC from September 4, 1949 to December 11, 1949, and from March 17, 1950 to Apri 28, 1950.

== Overview ==
Originating from Chicago, the program broadcast "smooth, relaxed music" and other variety show elements. It was first broadcast on Sundays from 8:30 to 9 p.m. Eastern Time. When it returned in March 1950 it was on Fridays from 9:30 to 10 p.m. E. T. The show's name came from its being half the usual length of TV variety shows of the time.

Regular performers included:

- Nancy Doran and Dick France
- Nancy Evans
- Billy Johnson
- Dick Larkin
- Bill Sherry
- Gloria Van
- The Bill Weber Marionettes

Rex Maupin and his orchestra provided music.

== Production ==
Greg Garrison was the producer and director, and Dan Schuffman was the writer. The program was presented live and had no studio audience. Its competition during its first run included The Ed Sullivan Show on CBS, Colgate Theatre on NBC, and films on Dumont. When it returned, its competition included Actors Studio and Ford Theatre (alternating) on CBS and The Big Story and Life Begins at Eighty (alternating) on NBC.

== See also ==
- 1949–50 United States network television schedule
