= Hollywood Screen Test =

American TV talent show (1948–1953)

- Genre: Talent show
- Presented by: Bert Lytell; Neil Hamilton
- Country of origin: United States
- Original language: English
- No. of seasons: 5

Production
- Producers: Lester Lewis; Juliette Lewis
- Running time: 30 minutes

Original release
- Network: ABC
- Release: April 15, 1948 – May 1, 1953

Hollywood Screen Test is an American talent show that aired on ABC from 1948 to 1953. This program holds the distinction as the first regularly broadcast television series by the American Broadcasting Company.

== Format ==
Debuting on April 15, 1948, and hosted first by Bert Lytell and then Neil Hamilton, Hollywood Screen Test sought to give exposure to many up-and-coming actors who were looking for their big break. The relatively unknown actors would be picked to guest star on the show, then they would have half-hour scenes of dialogue with established stage and screen actors.

Actors who appeared on Hollywood Screen Test included Grace Kelly, Jack Klugman, Pernell Roberts, Jack Lemmon, Michael Strong, Tommy Rettig, Susan Cabot, and Ralph Clanton.

Martha Wayne and Robert Quarry were assistants on the program. Ted Campbell was the announcer. Lester H. Lewis created the program. He and his wife, Juliette Lewis were the producers. Directors were Frederic Carr and Alton Alexander.

In 1951, participants on the program were selected via regional talent searches, such as a June 5, 1951, session in Detroit in which Jessica Landau, a Universal-International representative, chose a winner from 10 contestants. That was one of 11 searches over six weeks in a cooperative effort between Universal and the program.

== Schedule ==
This program was the first network series telecast on ABC, which began regular broadcasting in April 1948.

Broadcast Schedule for Hollywood Screen Test
Months	Day of Week	Time Slot
April - May 1948	Thursday	8 - 8:30
May - June 1948	Sunday	6:30-7
August - September 1948	Sunday	7:30 - 8
October 1948 - May 1949	Sunday	8 - 8:30
May 1949 - September 1950	Saturday	7:30 - 8
September 1950 - May 1953	Monday	7:30 - 8

Notes: All times Eastern. Source: The Complete Directory to Prime Time Network and Cable TV Shows, 1946-Present

== Reception and lawsuit ==
Jack Gould, in a review of the February 2, 1953, episode in The New York Times, praised the show as "a program that in its own quiet way often does more real experimentation in drama than many of its more publicized counterparts." He complimented the presentation of "With Malice Toward None" as "creative TV, with a point of view and imagination and made for an absorbing thirty minutes".

In January 1949, Screen Test, Incorporated, sued ABC and the show's producers for $500,000, charging that their idea had been stolen. The plaintiffs had a Screen Test radio program and said that existence of Hollywood Screen Test had cost them an opportunity to sell their show. A Supreme Court justice in New York City refused to issue a permanent injunction against Hollywood Screen Test when he put the case on the court's docket.

== Episodes ==
Six episodes are in the collection of the UCLA Film and Television Archive.

Partial List of Episodes of Hollywood Screen Test
Date	Title	Actor(s)
April 21, 1952	"Alibi for Murder"	John Dall, Joyce Leer, Richard Bowler
September 8, 1952	"First Page Story"	Ilka Chase, William Darrid, Joseph Hardy
September 15, 1952	"Hot Tamales"	Veronica Lake, Bart Burns, Gilbert Mack
October 20, 1952	"First Edition"	Donald Cook, Richard Purdy, Deidre Owens
October 27, 1952	"Vote for Doodle"	Eddie Bracken, Barney Hughes, Billie Lou Watt
November 3, 1952	"Grand Exit"	Fay Bainter, Ward Costello, Peggy Nelson
November 11, 1952	"Jonathon Trimble"	Albert Dekker, Dorothy Jolliffe, Chris Barberry
November 24, 1952	"Dedication"	Sidney Blackmer, Anne Diamond, Ivan Cury
February 2, 1953	"With Malice Toward None"	John Beal, Hal Holbrook, Constance Clausen, Blair Davies, Marie Stroud
March 30, 1953	"'Foster' Joe"	Stuart Erwin, Helen Shields, Mary Michael, Jose Perez

== See also ==
- 1948-49 United States network television schedule
- 1949-50 United States network television schedule
- 1950-51 United States network television schedule
- 1951-52 United States network television schedule
- 1952-53 United States network television schedule
