= Amateur Boxing Fight Club =

- Genre: Sports
- Presented by: Dennis James
- Country of origin: United States
- Original language: English

Production
- Running time: 60 minutes

Original release
- Network: DuMont
- Release: September 1949 – 1950

Amateur Boxing Fight Club is a boxing program aired on the DuMont Television Network beginning in September 1949 as part of DuMont's sports programming. Most of DuMont's boxing programs at this time were hosted by Dennis James. The 60-minute program aired Fridays at 10pm ET.

== Preservation status ==
The UCLA Film and Television Archive has episodes of Amateur Boxing Fight Club as well as shows labeled as Boxing With Dennis James.

== See also ==
- List of programs broadcast by the DuMont Television Network
- List of surviving DuMont Television Network broadcasts
- 1949-50 United States network television schedule
- Boxing From Jamaica Arena (September 1948 – 1949)
- Wrestling From Marigold (September 1949 – 1955)
- Boxing From Eastern Parkway (May 1952-May 1954)
- Boxing From St. Nicholas Arena (1954–1956)
- Saturday Night at the Garden (1950–1951)

== Bibliography ==
- David Weinstein, The Forgotten Network: DuMont and the Birth of American Television (Philadelphia: Temple University Press, 2004) ISBN 1-59213-245-6
- Alex McNeil, Total Television, Fourth edition (New York: Penguin Books, 1980) ISBN 0-14-024916-8
- Tim Brooks and Earle Marsh, The Complete Directory to Prime Time Network TV Shows, Third edition (New York: Ballantine Books, 1964) ISBN 0-345-31864-1
