= Starlight Theatre (TV series) =

American TV anthology series (1950–1951)

Starlight Theatre is a 30-minute American television anthology series of romantic stories that aired on CBS from April 2, 1950, to October 4, 1951. Forty-nine episodes aired. In 1950-1951 it alternated with The George Burns and Gracie Allen Show.

Guest stars that appeared include Mary Sinclair, Julie Harris, Barry Nelson, Eve Arden, John Forsythe, Melvyn Douglas, Jackie Cooper, George Reeves, Jean Stapleton, Felicia Montealegre Bernstein, and Franchot Tone.

== Production ==
Robert Stevens was the producer. The directors included Stevens, John Peyser, Yul Brynner, Martin Ritt, and Curt Conway. The program originated from WCBS-TV and was sustaining. It was broadcast at 7 p.m. Eastern Time on Sundays, replacing The Girls.

== Critical response ==
Critic Jack Gould commended the "Welcome Home" episode for its portrayal of a radio correspondent who was thrust into celebrity status when she returned to the United States from the Far East. Gould's review in The New York Times noted that the episode's lines often seemed "awkward and contrived" and that the "direction was satisfactory".

== Episodes ==
Partial List of Episodes of Starlight Theatre
Date	Title	Actor(s)
April 23, 1950	"White Mail"	George Reeves, Margaret Phillips, Isobel Elsom
July 10, 1950	"The Last Kiss"	Mary Sinclair, John McQuade
November 16, 1950	"Welcome Home"	Nancy Kelly, Robert Webber
December 28, 1950	"Two White Horses"	Lee Bowman.
March 22, 1951	"The Flaxen Haired Mannequin"	Gil Lamb
September 6, 1951	"Act of God Nonwithstanding"	Chester Morris, Olive Deering, John McGovern, Michael Higgins, Bert Conway, Jock McGraw, Joe Mantell, Ray Danton
