= Volume One (TV series) =

American TV Anthology series (1949)

Volume One is a 30-minute American television anthology series produced, written, and hosted by Wyllis Cooper. It was a short-lived series that featured mystery and suspense stories. Six episodes aired on the American Broadcasting Company's WJZ-TV Channel 7 in New York City in 1949.

== History ==
The series had six episodes: "Number One", "Number Two", "Number Three", "Number Four", "Number 5", and "Number Six". Airing from June 16 to July 21, 1949, each episode lasted 30 minutes, airing on ABC on Thursday from 9:30pm–10:30pm. The show's host and narrator was Ernest Chappell, while its announcer was Ed Michael. Wyllis Cooper served as its producer, director, narrator, and writer.

The producers initially planned to title the show Quiet Please!, which had an identical title as Cooper's radio show. Late into production, they decided against using that name.

== Episodes and cast members ==
The series had six episodes:

1. "Volume One: The Bell Hop Story" stars Jack Lescoulie, Nancy Sheridan, and Frankie Thomas.
2. "Volume One: Number Two" stars Donald Briggs, Anne Seymour, and Sid Cassel.
3. "Volume One: Number Three" stars Alice Reinhart, Herb Sheldon, and Edgar Stehli.
4. "Volume One: Number 4" stars Nancy Sheridan and James Monks.
5. "Volume One: Number 5" stars Vicky Vola, William A. Lee, and Marie Kenney.
6. "Volume One: Number 6" stars Abby Lewis, Happy Felton, and Alex Segal.

Titled "Volume One: The Bellhop Story", the show's first episode featured Jack Lescoulie, Nancy Sheridan, and Frankie Thomas. It was about a man and woman played by Lescoulie and Sheridan who became stuck in their hotel rooms. They are in danger from a bellhop played by Thomas who discovers they had stolen money from a bank and had committed murder. The show was Lescoulie's first television role, kicking off an extensive career in the industry. The television series had very little scenery and a small cast. The premiere episode's stage set contained a mirror, a card table, and a chair. Escape, a 1950 television series, featured an identical cast and story as Volume One's first episode.

The second episode was about discussed an alluring woman who orchestrated how an actor became a dictator. Starring Abby Lewis, Happy Felton, and Alex Segal, "Volume One: Number 6" was about a journalist who reports on a time machine and how a scientist invented it. Segal was the series' camera director and an ABC-TV staff director before he took on the role as the scientist.

== Reception ==
In The Complete Directory to Prime Time Network and Cable TV Shows 1946–Present, historians Tim Brooks and Earle Marsh said "Volume One" was "an intelligent psychological thriller which drew rave reviews". TV Guide: Guide to TV said the series was marked by "tales of paranoia and suspense", while television historian Vincent Terrace called it "eeries stories of horror and suspense". Ben Gross of the New York Daily News wrote in 1949 that television viewers thought the show "is one of the best of the new programs", being "a suspenseful show, with a well written script".
