= People's Platform =

American radio and TV public affairs series

- Genre: Public affairs
- Country of origin: United States
- Language: English
- TV adaptations: People's Platform
- Hosted by: Lyman Bryce
- Original release: July 20, 1938 – August 10, 1952

People's Platform is an American radio and television public affairs series. The radio version aired on the CBS Radio network from July 20, 1938 to August 10, 1952. It was initially moderated by creator Lyman Bryce, and featured four panelists who debated the issues of the day. Dwight Cooke later moderated the show from 1946 until the end of its run. A concurrent television version, hosted by Quincy Howe, ran on the CBS Television network from August 17, 1948 to August 11, 1950. Charles Collingwood and Dwight Cooke were also moderators.

The TV version originally ran on Tuesday nights. After a single Friday night broadcast (January 7, 1949), the program aired on Mondays at various times.

== Television episodes and their status ==
December 16, 1949 - "What Future Course Should The Republican Party Take?"

Two episodes are known to survive at the Paley Center for Media, these date from January 24, 1949, and December 7, 1948, and are about the military budget, and wage increases, respectively.

== See also ==
- 1948-49 United States network television schedule
- 1949-50 United States network television schedule
