= Meet Your Congress =

1949 American public affairs television program

- Genre: Public affairs
- Presented by: Blair Moody
- Country of origin: United States
- Original language: English

Production
- Running time: 30 minutes

Original release
- Network: NBC (1949-1953); DuMont (1953-1954)
- Release: July 1, 1949 – July 4, 1954

Meet Your Congress is a public affairs TV series on NBC and on the DuMont Television Network. The show premiered on NBC on March 20, 1949, airing Fridays at 9 p.m. Eastern Time. In August it moved to Saturdays at 8:00 p.m. ET, airing until October.

On March 1, 1953, Meet Your Congress debuted as a filmed local program on WPIX-TV on Sundays from 11:00 to 11:30 p.m. Eastern Time.

The DuMont network run aired from July 8, 1953, until July 4, 1954. The moderator was Blair Moody, who hosted the radio and TV versions from 1946 to 1952. He died of pneumonia and heart problems on July 20, 1954.

The NBC radio version, which was transcribed, featured two United States senators, a Democrat and a Republican, discussing two sides of a controversial issue.

== Episode status ==
As with most DuMont series, no episodes are known to exist.

== Production ==
Moody produced the DuMont version of the program, and Vic Guidice was the director. The show originated in Washington, D.C., airing initially on Wednesdays from 9:30 to 10:00 p.m. ET, and then on Sundays from 6:30 to 7:00 p.m. ET. It was sustaining. Its competition included The George Jessel Show on ABC and The Roy Rogers Show on NBC.

== Critical response ==
A review of the July 8, 1953, episode in the trade publication Variety said that Meet Your Congress seemed to be "a promising package designed for the politically conscious citizenry." It also commended Moody's objective approach as the moderator.

== See also ==
- List of programs broadcast by the DuMont Television Network
- List of surviving DuMont Television Network broadcasts
- 1949-50 United States network television schedule

== Bibliography ==
- David Weinstein, The Forgotten Network: DuMont and the Birth of American Television (Philadelphia: Temple University Press, 2004) ISBN 1-59213-245-6
- Alex McNeil, Total Television, Fourth edition (New York: Penguin Books, 1980) ISBN 0-14-024916-8
- Tim Brooks and Earle Marsh, The Complete Directory to Prime Time Network and Cable TV Shows 1946–Present, Ninth edition (New York: Ballantine Books, 2007) ISBN 978-0-345-49773-4
