= Alex Segal =

American director and producer

- Born: July 1, 1915; Trenton, New Jersey, U.S.
- Died: August 22, 1977 (aged 62); Los Angeles, California, U.S.
- Occupations: Director, producer
- Years active: 1949–76
- Children: Jonathan Segal

Alex Segal (July 1, 1915 – August 22, 1977) was an American television director, television producer, and film director.

== Early years ==
Segal was born on July 1, 1915, in Trenton, New Jersey.

== Career ==
In 1948, Segal became a production assistant at ABC, working for $50 per week. He went on to direct more than 25 different television programs, including The Billy Daniels Show, The United States Steel Hour and Celanese Theater (1951–52), between his debut as a director on Starring Boris Karloff (1949) and his death in 1977. Segal directed some films, including Joy in the Morning in 1965.

Segal resigned from ABC in May 1955. Steps were under way toward his signing a new contract with the network, with an oral agreement in place. Segal never signed the contract because "a disagreement arose on the legal interpretation" of one of the contract's clauses. The resignation took effect after the last ABC episode of The United States Steel Hour was broadcast.

He received several Emmy nominations for his directing in the 1950s and won a Primetime Emmy for his TV directorship of Death of a Salesman in 1966. Segal also served as chairman of the Division of Drama at the University of Southern California from 1971 to 1976. During one of his hiatuses from TV he taught for one year at the University of Montana.

Segal's directing credits on Broadway include Compulsion (1957), Who Was That Lady I Saw You With? (1958), Jolly's Progress (1959), and One Flew Over the Cuckoo's Nest (1963).

== Personal life and death ==
In 1949 Segal married Ruth Storm, a stage manager. They had two children. He died on August 22, 1977, in Los Angeles, California.

== Filmography ==
=== As director ===
Year	Title	Notes
1949	Volume One	1 episode
1949	Starring Boris Karloff	
1949–1950	Actors Studio	4 episodes
1950–1951	Pulitzer Prize Playhouse	3 episodes
1951–1952	Celanese Theatre	16 episodes
1952	Columbia University Seminar	
1953–1954	The Campbell Playhouse	2 episodes
1953–1958	The United States Steel Hour	11 episodes
1956	Ransom!	
1956	Producers' Showcase	3 episodes
1958	Kraft Television Theatre	1 episode
1958–1961	The DuPont Show of the Month	6 episodes
1959	Playhouse 90	2 episodes
1960–1961	NBC Sunday Showcase	3 episodes
1961	Alcoa Premiere	1 episode
1963	Hedda Gabler	BBC and CBS TV Movie
1963	Bob Hope Presents the Chrysler Theatre	1 episode
1963	All the Way Home	
1964	The Nurses	1 episode
1965	Joy in the Morning	
1965	Harlow	Magna version starring Carol Lynley
1966	Death of a Salesman	TV movie
1966	ABC Stage 67	1 episode
1967	The Crucible	TV movie
1967	The Diary of Anne Frank	TV movie
1968	Certain Honorable Men	TV movie
1970	To Confuse the Angel	TV movie
1971	Decisions! Decisions!	TV movie
1973	The Lie	TV movie
1975	My Father's House	TV movie
1976	The Story of David	TV movie
1976	Rich Man, Poor Man Book II	TV miniseries

=== As producer ===
- Celanese Theatre (1951–1952; 15 episodes)
- Producers' Showcase (1956; 3 episodes)
- No Time for Sergeants (1958)
