= Celanese Theatre =

American TV anthology series (1951–1952)

- Genre: Anthology
- Directed by: Alex Segal
- Composer: Bernard Green
- Country of origin: United States
- Original language: English
- No. of episodes: 20

Production
- Executive producers: Alex Segal; A. Burke Crotty
- Running time: 60 minutes (Oct-Dec 1951)/30 minutes (Jan-Jun 1952)
- Production company: William Morris Agency

Original release
- Network: ABC
- Release: October 3, 1951 – June 25, 1952

Celanese Theatre is an anthology television series which aired from October 3, 1951, to June 25, 1952, on ABC.

== Concept ==
The series arose from the Playwrights' Repertory Theater of Television with its focus on adapting stage plays to television.

Produced by the Celanese Corporation and the William Morris Agency, it featured plays by Maxwell Anderson, Philip Barry, Rachel Crothers, Eugene O'Neill, S. N. Behrman, Elmer Rice, John Van Druten, Sidney Howard, Paul Osborn, and Robert E. Sherwood. The program's first production was O'Neill's Ah, Wilderness!.

== Episodes ==
- February 6, 1952 - "Brief Moment" - Robert Sterling, Veronica Lake, Burgess Meredith

== Schedule ==
Celanese Theatre aired as a 60-minute program on Wednesdays at 10 p.m. ET. Beginning on January 9, 1952, the show aired in a 30-minute version which ran from 10 p.m. to 10:30 p.m. ET. The show alternated with Pulitzer Prize Playhouse.

For two months beginning in October, Celanese Theatre alternated with King's Crossroads, which was a "movie series".

== Recognition ==
Celanese Theatre was nominated for Primetime Emmy awards as Outstanding Drama Series in 1952 and 1953. It won the Peabody Award in 1951, with the comment "For the first time, Celanese Theatre fused the realism and vitality of the theatre at its best with inventive camera and production techniques, revealing the limitless potentialities of television to project great drama into the American home."

== Cancellation ==
The program ended when officials at the Celanese company concluded that it cost too much, despite positive recognition by critics and awards organizations. On August 12, 1952, Milton R. Bass wrote in The Berkshire Eagle: "It has been impossible for the network to sell the program because no other sponsor wants to pay for a program called Celanese Theatre. Any other name would mean nothing to the public and all those awards and huzzahs are absolutely down the drain."

== Notable guest stars ==
- Jean-Pierre Aumont
- Richard Burton
- Wendell Corey
- Helen Craig
- Melvyn Douglas
- Mildred Dunnock
- Ann Dvorak
- Lillian Gish
- Coleen Gray
- June Havoc
- Kim Hunter
- Ruth Hussey
- Jack Klugman
- Veronica Lake
- Karl Malden
- Roddy McDowall
- Burgess Meredith
- Thomas Mitchell
- Ralph Morgan
- David Niven
- Mickey Rooney
- Robert Stack
- Robert Sterling

== See also ==
- 1951-52 United States network television schedule
