= Tonight on Broadway =

American anthology TV series (1948–1949)

Tonight on Broadway is a weekly television show that ran from 1948 to 1949 on the CBS Television network. It premiered locally in New York City on April 6, 1948, and became a network show on April 20, 1948.

== Format ==
The show initially aired excerpts from Broadway shows live from the theaters in which they were playing, giving viewers a behind-the-scenes perspective via interviews with the shows' stars. When it returned in October 1949, the interviews had been eliminated, with the entire program allocated to scenes from the spotlighted Broadway production.

== Schedule and hosts ==
Tonight on Broadway was broadcast from 7 to 7:30 p.m. Eastern Time on Tuesdays from April 6, 1948, until May 23, 1948, with Martin Gosch as the first host. John Mason Brown replaced him in that role on April 27, 1948. It returned on October 2, 1949, with Brown as host, running from 7 to 7:30 p.m. E. T. on Sundays until December 18, 1949.

== Episodes and theaters ==
Partial List of Plays Featured on Tonight on Broadway
Date	Theatre	Play and notes
April 20, 1948	Shubert Theatre	High Button Shoes
April 27, 1948	Morosco Theatre	Strange Bedfellows
May 4, 1948	Broadhurst Theatre	Make Mine Manhattan
May 11, 1948	Booth Theatre	The Play's the Thing (Revival)
May 18, 1948	Henry Miller's Theater	For Love or Money
May 25, 1948	Adelphi Theatre	Look, Ma, I'm Dancin'!
November 27, 1949		Yes, M'Lord
December 2, 1949		Lend an Ear

Other shows that were featured included Texas and Li'l Darlin'. Other venues from which featured shows originated included the Mark Hellinger and Shubert theaters.

== Production ==
Gosch was the producer, and Roland Gillette was one of the directors. Maxine Keith was the program coordinator. American Tobacco Company sponsored the first session, and Esso Standard Oil Company sponsored the 1949 version.

== Critical response ==
Jack Gould's review in The New York Times called the network debut of Tonight on Broadway "a decided disappointment for a premiere which had been heralded as a 'milestone' in television.'" The review summed up the episode as essentially an advertising vehicle for Mr. Roberts (the featured play) and said, "certainly television merits a better fate than being used merely as an animated billboard." Gould wrote that televised scenes from the play demonstrated TV's potential to enable viewers to see live theater in their homes, and he noted the contrasts between theater and television with regard to "the absolute assurance and sense of presence" of the actors and the quality of the sets. He called some of the questions in the interview segments "silly" and suggested that Gosch should relinquish the host's role in order to concentrate more on his role as producer.

Kelly Kessler wrote in the book Broadway in the Box: Television's Lasting Love Affair with the Musical, "Regardless of its longevity or apparent spotty quality, Tonight on Broadway brought viewers one step closer to Broadway."

A review in the New York Daily News said that the premiere episode "provided fine fodder for video fans" and commended Ben Sylvester for his work on the script. It said that the uneven nature of the production was "a minor defect, easily remedied". Overall, the review described the program as "a high-powered booster" for the theater, presenting enough of a sample of the play to make the audience want more.

John Crosby' review indicated that the show failed to achieve its goal of creating more demand for tickets to Broadway shows, primarily because of the differences between stage and TV. He pointed out that one number from Lend an Ear "wasn't exactly sensational on a 10-inch television screen." Additionally, he wrote, the actors were "playing to the 10th row rather than to a spot 10 feet away from their noses, which is where the television audience sits." Overall, he doubted that watching this production would encourage people to buy tickets to see the complete show in the theater.

== See also ==
- 1948-49 United States network television schedule
- 1949-50 United States network television schedule
