= The Black Robe (TV series) =

American TV court series (1949–1950)

The Black Robe is a weekly 30-minute American docu-drama anthology court show based on actual police night court cases that was broadcast on the National Broadcasting Company from May 18, 1949, until March 30, 1950. Its creator was Phillips H. Lord.

== Format ==
Frankie Thomas Sr. portrayed the judge, and John Green was the court clerk. People who were not professional actors portrayed attorneys and witnesses. They sometimes appeared embarrassed and erred in delivering their lines, making the program seem more true-to-life. In some cases, defendants and witnesses from the actual cases appeared in the dramatized versions of them, but their names and appearances were altered.

The research staff of The Black Robe regularly went around New York City seeking potential participants for the show. "From Harlem to the Bowery, from Hell's Kitchen to the East River" staff members asked "people in bars, on street corners, on busses and in the subway" if they might want to be on TV. Willing respondents were photographed and interviewed, and specific comments about their appearance and mannerisms were noted on file cards. Those selected to appear on the program went to the staff's offices to be briefed on the case in which they would appear. Rather than follow a script, they learned to use their own words to present their case.

== Production ==
Warren Wade was the executive producer, and Edward Sutherland was the director.

Although The Black Robe "received a number of commendations for its public service and humanitarian work", it lasted only 10 months because it lacked a sponsor. It was initially broadcast on Wednesdays from 8:30 to 9 p.m. Eastern Time. From August 1949 through October 1949, it was on Mondays at "various times". In November and December 1949 it was on Saturdays from 10 to 10:30 p.m. E. T. In January 1950 it was moved to Thursdays from 8 to 8:30 p.m. E. T., remaining in that time slot until it went off the air.

The Black Robe was titled Police Night Court during "its early weeks" on the air.

== Critical response ==
A review in the trade publication Billboard praised the assortment of non-actor characters but commented that "the program goes overboard" in its efforts to achieve realistic images and dialog. The reviewer also found that the episode presented too many cases, which limited their development and resulted in a bare-bones presentation of each case.

Jack Gould wrote in The New York Times that The Black Robe was "a remarkably successful example of television's peculiar ability to project absolute realism and naturalness." Gould complimented the directorial work, noting that the way cameras were used enhanced the feeling of the program's being a documentary. The only flaw mentioned in the review was the demeanor of the judge, who was "altogether too pompous and stuffed-shirt."

John Crosby wrote that the show was effective because of its use of non-professional actors. "No dialogue writer could make it so convincing or so gripping," he said, as "their halting explanations in their own picturesque speech."
