= Boxing from Sunnyside Gardens =

- Genre: Sports
- Presented by: Dennis James
- Country of origin: United States
- Original language: English

Production
- Running time: 90/120 minutes

Original release
- Network: DuMont
- Release: September 1949 – 1950

Boxing From Sunnyside Gardens is a boxing program aired live from Sunnyside Gardens in Queens, New York on the DuMont Television Network beginning in September 1949 as part of DuMont's sports programming. Most of DuMont's boxing programs at this time were hosted by Dennis James. The program aired Thursdays at 9:30pm ET following The Morey Amsterdam Show.

== Preservation status ==
The UCLA Film and Television Archive has several episodes labeled as Boxing With Dennis James but it is unclear if this series is among those held by UCLA.

== See also ==
- List of programs broadcast by the DuMont Television Network
- List of surviving DuMont Television Network broadcasts
- 1949-50 United States network television schedule

== Bibliography ==
- David Weinstein, The Forgotten Network: DuMont and the Birth of American Television (Philadelphia: Temple University Press, 2004) ISBN 1-59213-245-6
- Alex McNeil, Total Television, Fourth edition (New York: Penguin Books, 1980) ISBN 0-14-024916-8
- Tim Brooks and Earle Marsh, The Complete Directory to Prime Time Network TV Shows, Third edition (New York: Ballantine Books, 1964) ISBN 0-345-31864-1
