= The Sonny Kendis Show =

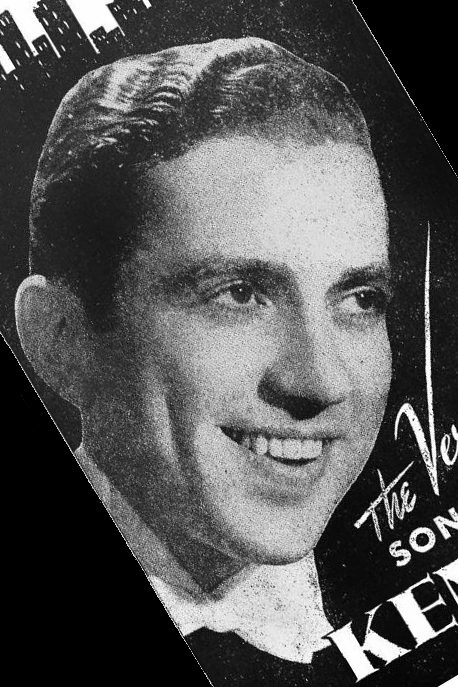
Sonny Kendis, c. 1943

The Sonny Kendis Show is an early United States television series which aired on CBS Television from April 18, 1949, to circa January 3, 1950. Unusually, the series aired in a 10-minute time slot, at 7:45 pm to 7:55 pm ET on Mondays, Tuesdays, Thursdays, and Fridays, preceded by the 15-minute CBS Television News, and followed by the 5-minute Ruthie on the Telephone.

The show featured pianist and big band leader Sonny Kendis (1911-1974) and vocalist Gigi Durston (born October 8, 1927). On Wednesdays at 7:45 pm ET, the 15-minute musical show Earl Wrightson at Home aired on CBS.

== Reception ==
Billboard reviewed the series in its September 3, 1949, issue, giving the series a positive review, saying that "Sonny Kendis has the flashy kind of eye-catching piano playing style which, no doubt, will appeal to many viewers" and that "the production and direction were very good."

== See also ==
- 1949-50 United States network television schedule
