= Jim and Judy in Teleland =

- The series titlecard
- Created by: Paul N. Peroff
- Developed by: Paul N. Peroff
- Written by: Paul N. Peroff
- Directed by: Paul N. Peroff
- Voices of: Merrill Johns; Honey McKenzie
- Country of origin: United States
- Original language: English
- No. of episodes: 52

Production
- Producers: Paul N. Peroff; Charles Basch
- Running time: 5 minutes approx.
- Production companies: Television Screen Productions; Film Flash Productions

Original release
- Network: First-run Syndication
- Release: September 1949 – 1950

Jim and Judy in Teleland is a 1949 American syndicated animated television series. It was one of the first cartoon series made for television and was featured regularly as a part of children's shows on local television. The series was later shown in 1959 under the title Bob and Betty in Adventureland.

== Premise ==
In the show, Jim and Judy, two all-American kids, climbed into their TV set to have adventures in Teleland. The show used "a mélange of cutout animation (jogging cardboard figures past the screen to create the illusion of movement) and limited cel art."

== History ==
Peroff created 52 episodes of the series in 1949-50 but had a difficult time finding distribution for his product. The show was later sold to Venezuela in 1954, to Deadwood, South Dakota, in 1954 and to Japan in 1956. Much of the series was believed to be lost for a long time; however, in 2023, all 52 episodes were discovered in UCLA's film and television archives.

== List of episodes ==
1. The Sunken Treasure
2. The Secret Cave
3. The Eagle's Nest
4. The Chase Across the Desert
5. The Tiger Hunt
6. The Crocodile Pool
7. The Magic Flute
8. The Kangaroo Boxing Match
9. The North Pole Frolics
10. The Circus Comes to Town
11. The Great Circus Robbery
12. The Show Goes On
13. The Big Blow Up
14. The Sealed Envelope
15. The House of Mystery
16. The Lost Trail
17. The Baby Carriage Mystery
18. The Forged Letter
19. The Hidden Microphone
20. The Rajah's Boy
21. The Stowaway
22. The Strange Pit
23. The Secret Submarine Base
24. The Big Fight
25. The Submarine Captain
26. Hero's Reward
27. The Great Prison Break
28. The Junior F.B.I.
29. The Mechanical Monster
30. The Kidnapped Professor
31. The Bubble Gum Mystery
32. The Sky Pirates
33. The Magic Paint
34. The Strange Message
35. The Menace from Mars
36. The Atom Bomb
37. The Wonders of Mars
38. Captured
39. The Great Air Battle
40. The Mysterious Treasure
41. The Crazy Scientist
42. The Terror of the Cave
43. The Thing?
44. The Midnight Alarm
45. The Cannibal Island
46. Double Crossed
47. Buried Treasure
48. A Friend Is Lost
49. Kidnapped
50. The Space Ship
51. The Frustrated Robbery
52. A Magnificent Present
