= The School House =

- Starring: Kenny Delmar
- Country of origin: United States
- No. of episodes: 14 (13 missing)

Production
- Running time: 30 minutes

Original release
- Network: DuMont
- Release: January 18 – April 19, 1949

The School House is an early American television program broadcast on Tuesday evenings at 9:00 PM Eastern by the DuMont Television Network for a few months in 1949.

== Premise ==
Kenny Delmar starred as a teacher in a classroom setting; he called on students to entertain. The cast included Arnold Stang, Wally Cox, Betty Ann Nyman, Kenny Bower, Tommy Dix, Eileen Stanley, and Roger Price.

== Episode status ==
The March 22, 1949, episode exists, and can be viewed online at the Internet Archive.

== Production ==
Robert H. Gordon was the producer and director. The School House was broadcast on Tuesdays from 9 to 9:30 p.m. Eastern Time.

== See also ==
- List of programs broadcast by the DuMont Television Network
- List of surviving DuMont Television Network broadcasts

== Bibliography ==
- David Weinstein, The Forgotten Network: DuMont and the Birth of American Television (Philadelphia: Temple University Press, 2004) ISBN 1-59213-245-6
- Alex McNeil, Total Television, Fourth edition (New York: Penguin Books, 1980) ISBN 0-14-024916-8
- Tim Brooks and Earle Marsh, The Complete Directory to Prime Time Network TV Shows, Third edition (New York: Ballantine Books, 1964) ISBN 0-345-31864-1
