= Program Playhouse =

- Genre: Anthology
- Country of origin: United States
- Original language: English
- No. of seasons: 1
- No. of episodes: 13

Production
- Producer: James Caddigan
- Running time: 30 minutes

Original release
- Network: DuMont
- Release: June 22 – September 14, 1949

Program Playhouse is an anthology television series aired on the DuMont Television Network on Wednesdays from June 22 to September 14, 1949.

== Overview ==
Program Playhouse presented a variety of kinds of programs to determine how potential sponsors and audiences reacted to each one. Hands of Murder was a program that originated on this show.

== Episodes ==
As with most DuMont series, no episodes are known to exist.

=== Partial list of episodes ===
The first program starred Ernest Truex as Caspar Milquetoast in "The Timid Soul". Others included

- "Trouble, Inc." - Earl Hammond
- "Roscoe Karns and Inky Poo" - Roscoe Karns
- "The Hands of Murder"

== See also ==
- List of programs broadcast by the DuMont Television Network
- List of surviving DuMont Television Network broadcasts

== Bibliography ==
- David Weinstein, The Forgotten Network: DuMont and the Birth of American Television (Philadelphia: Temple University Press, 2004) ISBN 1-59213-245-6
