= Rand Morrison =

Rand Morrison (born June 22, 1949) is the winner of 10 Emmy Awards, two George Foster Peabody Awards and a duPont award. He has been the executive producer of "CBS News Sunday Morning" since September 1999.

== Background ==
Morrison was born in Cleveland, Ohio, on June 22, 1949. He started his career with the Associated Press and United Press International from 1977 to 1982. In 1982 he joined CBS News as a writer for "Nightwatch."

== Education ==
Morrison graduated from Ohio State University with a BA in English and from Northwestern University with a master's degree in journalism.

== Career ==
Morrison has been the executive producer of the "CBS News Sunday Morning" show since September 1999. The show averaged 6.1 million viewers during the first quarter of 2014 and it won a Daytime Emmy in 2014. Before his work with "CBS Sunday Morning" he was the executive producer of CBS News Productions from 1998 to 1999. He produced the 13-part "Century of Country" series about the history of country music for The Nashville Network. Prior to this, he was in senior management for several CBS News magazines. He was the senior broadcast producer for "Public Eye with Bryant Gumbel" from 1997 to 1998 and for "48 Hours" from 1996 to 1997. From 1993 to 1996 he was a senior producer for "Eye to Eye with Connie Chung."
