= Fishing and Hunting Club =

American TV panel show (1949–1950)

- Also known as: Sports for All
- Genre: Sports
- Starring: Bill Slater (host)
- Country of origin: United States
- Original language: English

Production
- Running time: 30 minutes

Original release
- Network: DuMont
- Release: October 7, 1949 – March 31, 1950

Fishing and Hunting Club is a DuMont Television Network program that was aired on Fridays at 9 pm ET from September 30, 1949, to March 31, 1950. On January 20, 1950, the name of the show changed to Sports for All.

== Overview ==
The 30-minute program was hosted by Bill Slater. In the program, panelists answered viewer-submitted questions about fishing and hunting. Members of the panel were Gail Borden, a former Olympian; Jeff Bryant, an author; Jim Hurley, outdoor editor for the New York Daily Mirror; and Dave Newell, former editor of Field & Stream. It also included "demonstrations and interviews with various outdoor experts and enthusiasts". The program originated from WABD.

== Episode status ==
Only one or two episodes are held in the J. Fred MacDonald collection at the Library of Congress.

== Radio version ==
Fishing and Hunting Club of the Air began on ABC radio in July 1945, and it moved to the Mutual network in January 1946. It featured the same host and panelists as the TV show. Mail Pouch Tobacco Company was the primary sponsor. Listeners submitted 15,000 letters to the program each week, with 16 to 20 having their questions answered on the air. Those who submitted questions that were used on the program received a hunting- or fishing-related gift.

== See also ==
- List of programs broadcast by the DuMont Television Network
- List of surviving DuMont Television Network broadcasts
- 1949-50 United States network television schedule

== Bibliography ==
- David Weinstein, The Forgotten Network: DuMont and the Birth of American Television (Philadelphia: Temple University Press, 2004) ISBN 1-59213-245-6
