= Everett Parker =

Reverend Everett Carlton Parker
- Born: January 17, 1913; Chicago, Illinois
- Died: September 17, 2015 (aged 102); White Plains, New York
- Citizenship: American
- Education: University of Chicago
- Occupations: Media activist and minister
- Spouse: Geneva Jones (m. 1939; died 2004)
- Children: Ruth Weiss, Eunice Kolczun (daughters); Rev. Truman E. Parker (son)

Everett Carlton Parker (January 17, 1913 – September 17, 2015) was an American media activist and ordained minister of the United Church of Christ.

Born in Chicago, Illinois, Parker attended the University of Chicago. Upon graduation in 1935, he spent a year with the Works Progress Administration, then another with the radio station WJBW. After returning to his hometown for a job as an advertiser, Parker enrolled at the Chicago Theological Seminary, earning a Ph.D. in 1943. He reentered the media world with a stint at NBC in New York, then taught at Yale Divinity School from 1945 to 1957. He was the Director of the Office of Communication of the United Church of Christ from 1954 to 1983.

He filed a successful petition to deny licensing renewal of television station WLBT in Jackson, Mississippi in the 1960s. The station had a poor record with regards to the civil rights of African Americans during the Civil Rights Movement.

Dozens of times both the FCC and US Congress heard testimony by Parker concerning the maintenance of equal-time provisions and fairness in the broadcasting industry.

I want them to remember that I was a guy who fought like the devil for the rights of minorities. — Everett C. Parker, Broadband & Social Justice interview, 2012

Parker was also involved in film and television. He hosted the 30-minute religious television program Stained Glass Windows. It ran from 1948 to 1949 on the ABC Television network. He produced Six American Families in 1977, a PBS television series.

Each year, "Everett C Parker Lecture" takes place in Washington. The event is held to promote telecommunications equity and is sponsored by the Benton Foundation.

== Personal life ==
He was married to Geneva Jones from 1939 to the time of her death in 2004. They had three children, Ruth Weiss, Eunice Kolczun, and Truman E. Parker. Everett Parker died at the age of 102 in a White Plains, New York hospital.
