= Cinema Varieties =

American television program

- Country of origin: United States

Production
- Running time: 30 minutes

Original release
- Network: DuMont
- Release: September 1949 – November 1949

Cinema Varieties is a television program on the DuMont Television Network which was shown on Sunday nights at 8:30 p.m. ET from September 1949 to November 1949. Clips from old movies were shown on this 30-minute program.

== Episode status ==
No episodes of this series are known to exist.

== See also ==
- List of programs broadcast by the DuMont Television Network
- List of surviving DuMont Television Network broadcasts
- 1949-50 United States network television schedule

== Bibliography ==
- David Weinstein, The Forgotten Network: DuMont and the Birth of American Television (Philadelphia: Temple University Press, 2004) ISBN 1-59213-245-6
- Alex McNeil, Total Television, Fourth edition (New York: Penguin Books, 1980) ISBN 0-14-024916-8
- Tim Brooks and Earle Marsh, The Complete Directory to Prime Time Network TV Shows, Third edition (New York: Ballantine Books, 1964) ISBN 0-345-31864-1
