= Patricia Shevlin =

American television news producer

- Born: August 24, 1949 (age 77)
- Occupation: Television news producer
- Years active: 1973–present
- Employer: CBS News

Patricia Shevlin (born August 24, 1949) was the executive producer of CBS Evening News from May 2011 until April 2014 when she moved to CBS's 60 Minutes. Before her tenure at Evening News she worked as the executive producer on the weekend edition of the program from 2000. She started at CBS in 1973. Along with colleague Miles Doran, Shevlin produced Voices of the Lost, the story of the disappearance of cargo ship El Faro, including recovered audio from the ship's last 26 hours.
