= Talent Jackpot =

- Genre: Game show
- Presented by: Vinton Freedley
- Narrated by: Bud Collyer
- Country of origin: United States
- Original language: English

Production
- Running time: 24 minutes

Original release
- Network: DuMont
- Release: July 13 – August 23, 1949

Talent Jackpot is an American game show broadcast on the DuMont Television Network from July 19 to August 23, 1949.

The show replaced Ted Steele's program. It was hosted by Broadway producer Vinton Freedley (1891-1969) with Bud Collyer as his assistant and announcer.

Contestants won by getting the most applause from the audience, and the top prize was $250. If a contestant won for three consecutive weeks, he or she received a one-week theater contract.

== Episode status ==
As with most DuMont series, no episodes are known to exist.

== Radio ==
The Mutual Broadcasting System had a similar program. John Reed King was host of the radio version of Talent Jackpot, which was broadcast on Thursdays at 8:30 p.m. Eastern Time. Applause from the audience determined each episode's winner, with a prize of $500 and "one week's engagement at a leading theatre in the country." Contestants could win no more than two weeks, receiving a maximum of $1,000 and two weeks at a theatre. Jack Rubin directed the Ed Wolfe Associates production, which was sustaining.

== See also ==
- List of programs broadcast by the DuMont Television Network
- List of surviving DuMont Television Network broadcasts

== Bibliography ==
- David Weinstein, The Forgotten Network: DuMont and the Birth of American Television (Philadelphia: Temple University Press, 2004) ISBN 1-59213-245-6
- Alex McNeil, Total Television, Fourth edition (New York: Penguin Books, 1980) ISBN 0-14-024916-8
- Tim Brooks and Earle Marsh, The Complete Directory to Prime Time Network TV Shows, Third edition (New York: Ballantine Books, 1964) ISBN 0-345-31864-1
