= Flight to Rhythm =

- Starring: Delora Bueno; Larry Carr; Miguelito Valdés Orchestra; Bob Pfeiffer (announcer)
- Country of origin: United States

Production
- Producer: Bob Loewi
- Running time: 15 minutes (March–May); 30 minutes (May–September)

Original release
- Network: DuMont
- Release: March 10 – September 22, 1949

Flight to Rhythm, produced by Bob Loewi (1911–1981), son of DuMont executive Mortimer Loewi (1888–1967), and that show's direct predecessor, The Delora Bueno Show, are early American television programs which aired on the DuMont Television Network.

== Broadcast history ==
The Delora Bueno Show, (which was Flight to Rhythm's immediate precursor), ran from March 10 to May 5, 1949, and was a 15-minute musical program hosted by Brazilian-raised vocalist and musician Delora Bueno (1925–2012). The program, produced and distributed by DuMont, aired Thursday nights at 7:00 pm ET on most DuMont affiliates.

On May 15, 1949 the series was retitled Flight to Rhythm and was expanded to thirty minutes. The revamped production was set in a fictional Brazilian nightclub called "Club Rio" with Nick the Bartender (Ralph Statley) hosting each episode. In addition to vocalist Bueno, Flight featured Larry Carr and the Miguelito Valdés Orchestra. The program aired on Sunday nights at 6:30 pm ET during the summer, and moved to Thursday at 8:00 pm ET in August. Its last broadcast was September 22, 1949.

== Episode status ==
Two episodes, the March 10, 1949 premiere episode of The Delora Bueno Show , and the May 15 Flight to Rhythm premiere, are in the Paley Center for Media collection.

== See also ==
- List of programs broadcast by the DuMont Television Network
- List of surviving DuMont Television Network broadcasts

== Bibliography ==
- David Weinstein, The Forgotten Network: DuMont and the Birth of American Television (Philadelphia: Temple University Press, 2004) ISBN 1-59213-245-6
- Alex McNeil, Total Television, Fourth edition (New York: Penguin Books, 1980) ISBN 0-14-024916-8
- Tim Brooks and Earle Marsh, The Complete Directory to Prime Time Network and Cable TV Shows 1946–Present, Ninth edition (New York: Ballantine Books, 2007) ISBN 978-0-345-49773-4
