= Let There Be Stars =

Television series

Let There Be Stars is a variety television series that was broadcast on ABC in 1949, the first program to originate in Hollywood for a major TV network. It debuted on September 21, 1949, and ended on November 27, 1949.

It was a high-budget show for its time, and used new production techniques such as "Teleparencies", transparencies which could be displayed in the background, faded in or out or dissolved, and changed on the fly.

The idea of the program was to highlight up-and-coming actors and actresses who had been found by a talent scout working to cast new performers in Broadway shows.

Variety magazine praised the premiere episode in a review, but the program's success did not last.

The first seven episodes are stored at the Paley Center for Media. The archive also has a "rough rehearsal kinescope" of episode 5.

Peter Marshall was the host.

== Production ==
Let There Be Stars originated at an east Hollywood studio that ABC bought from Warner Bros., making it "the first major network show produced out of Hollywood". The show's September 21, 1949, premiere on the west coast was recorded via kinescope to be shown in New York on October 16. Production and distribution proved to be difficult.

Leighton Brill and William Triz were the producers. The director was Richard J. Goggin, and the writer was Nat Linden.

== See also ==
- 1949-50 United States network television schedule
