= Hotel Broadway =

1949 American musical TV show

- Created by: Harvey Marlowe
- Starring: Jerri Blanchard (host)
- Country of origin: United States

Production
- Running time: 30 minutes

Original release
- Network: DuMont
- Release: January 20 – March 17, 1949

Hotel Broadway is a musical TV show broadcast on the now-defunct DuMont Television Network. The 30-minute show ran from January 20, 1949, to March 17, 1949. The show starred singer Jerri Blanchard and was produced by Harvey Marlowe.

The fictitious Hotel Broadway in Manhattan served as a background for comedy, music, and songs from a mixture of recent discoveries and established entertainers. In addition to Blanchard, regular performers included Avon Long, Rose and Rana, and The Striders. The Harry Ranch Sextet provided music.

The program was broadcast on Thursdays from 8:30 to 9 p.m. Eastern Time. It was renamed Front Row Center in April 1949.

== Format ==
A variety of comedians and singers appeared on the program each week, with no host. The Striders quartet introduced the acts as they appeared.

== Episode status ==
As with most DuMont series, no episodes are known to survive.

== See also ==
- List of programs broadcast by the DuMont Television Network
- List of surviving DuMont Television Network broadcasts

== Bibliography ==
- David Weinstein, The Forgotten Network: DuMont and the Birth of American Television (Philadelphia: Temple University Press, 2004) ISBN 1-59213-245-6
- Alex McNeil, Total Television, Fourth edition (New York: Penguin Books, 1980) ISBN 0-14-024916-8
- Tim Brooks and Earle Marsh, The Complete Directory to Prime Time Network TV Shows, Third edition (New York: Ballantine Books, 1964) ISBN 0-345-31864-1
