= Starring Boris Karloff =

- Also known as: Mystery Playhouse Starring Boris Karloff; Presenting Boris Karloff
- Genre: Suspense
- Directed by: Charles Warburton
- Presented by: Boris Karloff
- Country of origin: United States
- Original language: English
- No. of seasons: 1
- No. of episodes: 13

Production
- Producer: Charles Warburton

Original release
- Network: ABC
- Release: September 21 – December 15, 1949

Starring Boris Karloff is an American radio and television anthology series broadcast for 13 weeks, September–December 1949, on the ABC Television network. Boris Karloff was the host and occasional star, with music by organist George Henninger. Produced and directed by Charles Warburton, the series adapted short stories of mystery and suspense.

== Production ==
Starring Boris Karloff aired as an ABC Radio series. In a practice that was then becoming prevalent, the radio show was doubled on television on ABC-TV. The same script was used for both programs, but was adapted and altered for each medium.

Beginning with the October 27 broadcast, the title of the series was changed to Mystery Playhouse Starring Boris Karloff. The 30-minute program was also known as Boris Karloff Presents and Presenting Boris Karloff.

== Episodes ==
Radio historian John Dunning described Starring Boris Karloff as a horror anthology series that adapted well-known short stories by Arch Oboler, Cornell Woolrich and others. Sources for episode information include Jerry Haendiges Vintage Radio Logs.

Number	Title	Radio + TV Broadcast	Cast
1	"Five Golden Guineas"	September 21 + 22, 1949	Boris Karloff, Mildred Natwick
2	"The Mask"	September 28 + 29, 1949	
3	"Mungahara"	October 5 + 6, 1949	
4	"Mad Illusion"	October 12 + 13, 1949	
5	"Perchance to Dream"	October 19 + 20, 1949	
6	"The Devil Takes a Wife"	October 26 + 27, 1949	
7	"The Moving Finger"	November 2 + 3, 1949	
8	"The Twisted Path"	November 9 + 10, 1949	
9	"False Face"	November 16 + 17, 1949	Jean Muir
10	"Cranky Bill"	November 23 + 24, 1949	
11	"Three O'Clock"	November 30 + December 1, 1949	
12	"The Shop at Sly Corner"	December 7 + 8, 1949	Mary Malone, Oliver Thorndike
13	"The Night Reveals"	December 14 + 15, 1949	

== See also ==
- 1949-50 United States network television schedule
