= Teen Time Tunes =

1949 American television show

- Starring: Sue Bennett (singer); Alan Logan (musical director)
- Country of origin: United States

Production
- Running time: 15 minutes

Original release
- Network: DuMont
- Release: March 7 – July 5, 1949

Teen Time Tunes is a 1949 American television show broadcast on the now-defunct DuMont Television Network.

== Broadcast History ==
The 15-minute weeknight show featured singer Sue Bennett and the musical group The Alan Logan Trio. Bennett (known at the time as Sue Benjamin) later worked with Kay Kyser and went on to appear on many other 1950s television shows. The show aired from March 7 to July 5, 1949, or March 14, 1949, to July 15, 1949.

In contrast to the title, the low-budget show featured mostly musical standards.

== Episode status ==
As with most DuMont series, no episodes are known to exist.

== See also ==
- List of programs broadcast by the DuMont Television Network
- List of surviving DuMont Television Network broadcasts

== Bibliography ==
- David Weinstein, The Forgotten Network: DuMont and the Birth of American Television (Philadelphia: Temple University Press, 2004) ISBN 1-59213-245-6
- Alex McNeil, Total Television, Fourth edition (New York: Penguin Books, 1980) ISBN 0-14-024916-8
- Tim Brooks and Earle Marsh, The Complete Directory to Prime Time Network and Cable TV Shows 1946–Present, Ninth edition (New York: Ballantine Books, 2007) ISBN 978-0-307-48320-1
