= Foodini the Great =

Early CBS children's TV series

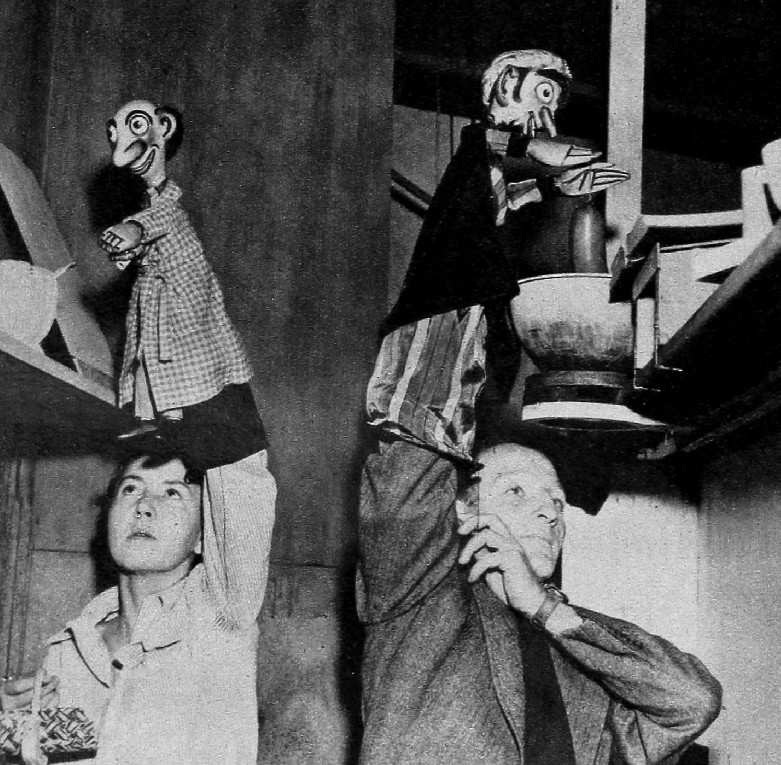
Pinhead (left) and Foodini as performed by their creators, Hope and Morey Bunin, in 1949.

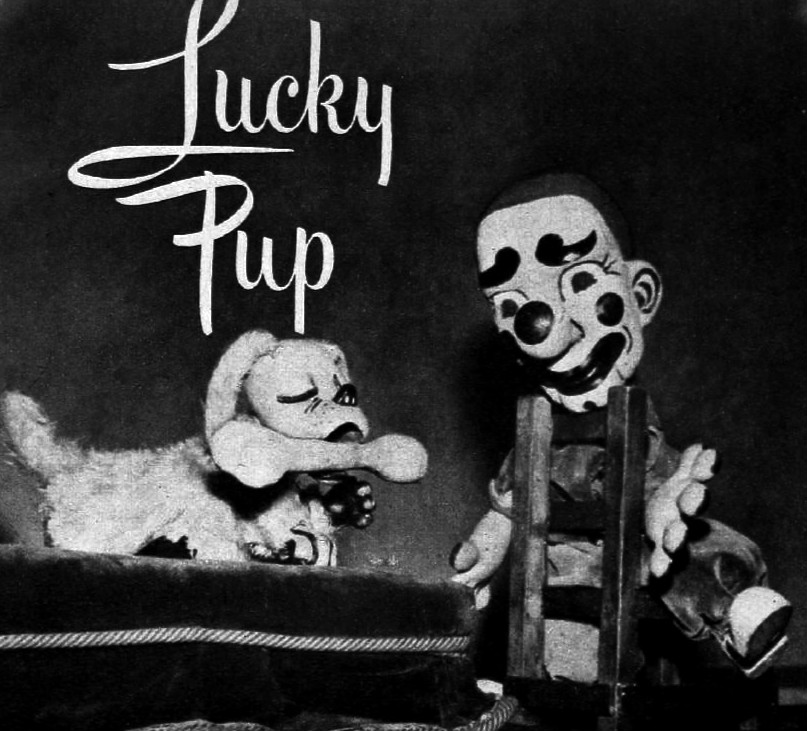
Lucky Pup and Jolo the clown in 1949.

Foodini the Great is an early CBS children's television series. A 15-minute puppet show, it was performed live at 6:30 p.m. Monday to Friday from August 23, 1948, to June 23, 1951.

The show was originally titled The Adventures of Lucky Pup, but Foodini the magician and his assistant Pinhead proved to be so popular the show was renamed.

There were Foodini comic books from Holyoke Publishing, as well as records, greeting cards, toys, and magic sets. The comic books are named The Great Foodini, Adventures of Foodini the Great, and Pinhead and Foodini.

The UCLA Film and Television Archive holds several kinescope recordings of this series, including a few episodes from 1948.
