= ABC Television Players =

American TV anthology series

- Genre: Anthology
- Narrated by: Don Gallaher
- Country of origin: United States
- Original language: English

Production
- Running time: 30 minutes

Original release
- Network: ABC
- Release: January 16 – October 30, 1949

ABC Television Players is an American live television anthology that ran on ABC from January 16, 1949, through October 30, 1949.

The program was originally called ABC Television Players, then (beginning in April) ABC Tele-Players, and finally (beginning in August) ABC Penthouse Players.

The program was a series of 30-minute, live dramatic presentations, containing little-known actors. It was narrated by Donald Gallaher, a Hollywood actor whose name was sometimes misspelled as Don Gallagher. The show was broadcast live from Chicago originating from WENR-TV. It was broadcast on Sundays from 7:30 to 8 p.m. Eastern Time and was sustaining. Fred Killian was the director, and H. Y. Bingham was the writer.

Episodes of the program included "Record of a Social Wreck" on June 26, 1949, and "The Betrayers" on June 5, 1949.

== See also ==
- 1949-50 United States network television schedule
