= The Crisis (TV series) =

- Directed by: Norman Felton
- Presented by: Adrian Spies
- Country of origin: United States
- Original language: English
- No. of seasons: 1

Production
- Running time: 30 minutes

Original release
- Network: NBC
- Release: October 5 – December 28, 1949

The Crisis is an American television series that aired live on NBC from October 5, 1949, to December 28, 1949.

== Synopsis ==
The series featured a guest describing events leading up to a critical moment in their life. At the major turning point in the story, the guest's story was stopped, and professional actors who did not know the outcome of the event, would act out the rest of the guest's story as they imagined it might have been resolved. The actors worked unrehearsed and without scripts. After the scene was acted out, the guest would return to explain what actually happened.

== Cast ==
- "Director" Arthur Peterson Jr. (Oct)
- "Director" Bob Cunningham (Nov-Dec)
- Adrian Spies
