= Think Fast (1949 game show) =

American TV quiz series (1949–1950)

- Genre: Game show
- Presented by: Mason Gross; Gypsy Rose Lee
- Starring: Leon Janney; Eloise McElhone
- Country of origin: United States
- Original language: English

Production
- Running time: 30 minutes

Original release
- Network: ABC
- Release: March 26, 1949 – October 8, 1950

Think Fast is an American television quiz show that ran on ABC from March 26, 1949 to October 8, 1950.

Media critic John Crosby described the program as "an adult's version of the old child's game, 'King of the Hill'". The quiz show revolved around a group of five panelists (three regulars and two weekly guest panelists) who would compete to see who had the most to say about a particular subject. They sat at a large table, each getting a chance to sit at the "King's" throne by out talking the others on subjects decided by the host. The regular panelists were Leon Janney, David Broekman, who was also the show's musical director, and Eloise McElhone. The first moderator was Mason Gross, who was succeeded by Gypsy Rose Lee. Rex Stout was host for the September 3, 1950, episode.

The program originally aired on Saturdays from 8:30 to 9 p.m. Eastern Time. In April 1949 it was moved to Fridays from 8 to 8:30 p.m. E. T. In September 1949 it was moved to Sundays from 8 to 8:30 p.m. E. T. In July 1950 it was moved to its final time slot, Sundays from 7 to 7:30 p.m. E. T.

The show's producer was Robert Kennings.

== See also ==
- 1949–50 United States network television schedule
