= Actors Studio (TV series) =

American television show

- Also known as: The Play's the Thing
- Genre: Drama
- Directed by: Ralph Warren (1948); David Pressman (1948–50); Fred Carr (1949); Alex Segal (1949–50); Yul Brynner (1949–50)
- Presented by: Marc Connelly
- Country of origin: United States
- Original language: English
- No. of seasons: 2
- No. of episodes: 65

Production
- Producers: Donald Davis (1949–50); Hume Cronyn
- Production company: Actors Studio

Original release
- Network: ABC (September 26, 1948 – October 26, 1949); CBS (November 1, 1949 – June 23, 1950)
- Release: September 26, 1948 – June 23, 1950

Actors Studio is an American television series that was hosted by Marc Connelly. It originally aired on ABC from September 26, 1948 to October 26, 1949 and then on CBS from November 1, 1949, to June 23, 1950. It was one of the first series to be picked up by a network after being cancelled by another network. CBS departed from its own precedent when it took the World Video-owned series. Until then it had not shown any sustaining programs that were not owned (at least partially) by CBS.

The series showcased short pieces of adapted, classic and original drama, performed and produced live each week from New York. Among some of the known authors were William Saroyan, James Thurber, Ring Lardner, Edgar Allan Poe, Irwin Shaw and Budd Schulberg. Featured actors included Martin Balsam, Richard Boone, Marlon Brando, Hume Cronyn, Julie Harris, Jean Muir and Jessica Tandy. Recurring performers included Jocelyn Brando, Tom Ewell, Steven Hill, Kim Hunter and Cloris Leachman.

In February 1950, the series moved to Friday nights and was expanded to one hour, alternating every other week with broadcasts of Ford Theatre. In March, the name of the show was changed to The Play's the Thing.

The series received a Peabody Award in 1949, being cited for its "outstanding contribution to the art of television". Henry S. White of World Video Inc. produced the series, and Donald Davis was the director. It originated from WCBS-TV.

The series had no sponsors, which led to a reduction in funds available for purchasing rights to properties for adaptation. The result of that change was a shift from "well-known one-act plays" to short stories".

== Critical reception ==
A review of the January 9, 1949, episode in the trade publication Variety said that "I'm No Hero" was "better-than-average . . . but still shows a need for even better material." While complimenting the direction, production, and settings, the review blamed the plot and some of the acting as the reasons that the story "never quite came alive."

Variety also reviewed the January 23, 1949, episode, "The Lady in 142", saying that James Thurber's story "was given firstrate (sic) styling with cast, settings and direction merging into an amusing flight of fancy."

== Broadcast history ==
NOTE: The most frequent time slot for the series in bold text.

- **Sunday evenings from 8:30–9:00 PM from September 26, 1948 – March 13, 1949, on ABC.**
- Thursday evenings from 8:30–9:00 PM from March 24 – April 28, 1949, on ABC.
- Thursday evenings from 9:30–10:00 PM from May 5–26, 1949 on ABC.
- Wednesday evenings from 8:00–8:30 PM from September 28 – October 26, 1949, on ABC.
- Tuesday evenings from 9:00–9:30 PM from November 1, 1949 – January 31, 1950, on CBS.
- Friday evenings from 9:00–10:00 PM from February 3–17, 1950 on CBS.
- Friday evenings from 9:00–9:30 from March 3 – April 28, 1950; May 26 – June 23, 1950, on CBS.
- Sunday evenings for one episode which aired May 21, 1950.

== Episodes ==
=== Series overview ===
Season	Episodes	Originally released		
Season	Episodes	First released	Last released	Network
1	35	September 26, 1948	May 26, 1949	ABC
2	30	September 28, 1949	June 23, 1950	ABC (episodes 1–5); CBS (episodes 6–30)

=== Season 1 (1948–49) ===
No. overall	No. in season	Title	Original release date
1	1	"Portrait of a Madonna"	September 26, 1948
2	2	"Night Club"	October 3, 1948
3	3	"The Giant's Stair"	October 10, 1948
4	4	"The Thousand Dollar Bill"	October 17, 1948
5	5	"The Catbird Seat"	October 24, 1948
6	6	"The Inexperienced Ghost"	October 31, 1948
7	7	"Ropes"	November 7, 1948
8	8	"Esther"	November 14, 1948
9	9	"Goodnight, Miss Lizzie Borden"	November 21, 1948
10	10	"Ten Percent"	November 28, 1948
11	11	"The Night the Ghost Got In"	December 5, 1948
12	12	"The Widow of Wasdale Head"	December 12, 1948
13	13	"The Man Who Lost Christmas"	December 19, 1948
14	14	"To the Lovely Margaret"	December 26, 1948
15	15	"A Day in Town"	January 2, 1949
16	16	"I'm No Hero"	January 9, 1949
17	17	"The Little Wife"	January 16, 1949
18	18	"The Lady on 142"	January 23, 1949
19	19	"A Trip to Czardis"	January 30, 1949
20	20	"Jim Pemberton and His Boy Trigger"	February 6, 1949
21	21	"Zone of Quiet"	February 13, 1949
22	22	"The Tell-Tale Heart"	February 20, 1949
23	23	"Greasy Luck"	February 27, 1949
24	24	"Joe McSween's Atomic Machine"	March 6, 1949
25	25	"Dead Man"	March 13, 1949
26	26	"Concerning a Woman of Sin"	March 24, 1949
27	27	"Three O'Clock"	March 31, 1949
28	28	"A Reputation"	April 7, 1949
29	29	"I Can't Breathe"	April 14, 1949
30	30	"From Paradise to Butte"	April 21, 1949
31	31	"Here Comes Spring"	April 28, 1949
32	32	"Somebody Has to Be Nobody"	May 5, 1949
33	33	"Salt of the Earth"	May 12, 1949
34	34	"Spreading the Word"	May 19, 1949
35	35	"You're Breaking My Heart"	May 26, 1949

=== Season 2 (1949–50) ===
No. overall	No. in season	Title	Original release date
36	1	"The Canterville Ghost"	September 28, 1949
37	2	"Terror in the Streets"	October 5, 1949
38	3	"It's a Free Country"	October 12, 1949
39	4	"We'll Never Have a Nickel"	October 19, 1949
40	5	"Clarissa"	October 26, 1949
41	6	"The Return to Kansas City"	November 1, 1949
42	7	"O'Halloran's Luck"	November 8, 1949
43	8	"The Frame-Up"	November 15, 1949
44	9	"The Three Strangers"	November 22, 1949
45	10	"The Thousand Dollar Bill (restaged)"	November 29, 1949
46	11	"The Man with the Heart in the Highlands"	December 6, 1949
47	12	"The Midway"	December 13, 1949
48	13	"A Child Is Born"	December 20, 1949
49	14	"County Full of Swedes"	December 27, 1949
50	15	"Hannah"	January 3, 1950
51	16	"An Ingenue of the Sierras"	January 10, 1950
52	17	"The Little Wife"	January 17, 1950
53	18	"The Timid Guy"	January 24, 1950
54	19	"Joe McSween's Atomic Machine (restaged)"	January 31, 1950
55	20	"Telas, the King"	February 3, 1950
56	21	"Mr. Mummy's Suspicion"	February 17, 1950
57	22	"The Apple Tree"	March 3, 1950
58	23	"The Pink Hussar"	March 17, 1950
59	24	"The Salt of the Earth (restaged)"	March 31, 1950
60	25	"Sanctuary in Paris"	April 14, 1950
61	26	"Screwball"	April 28, 1950
62	27	"Alison's House"	May 21, 1950
63	28	"The Token"	May 26, 1950
64	29	"The Swan"	June 9, 1950
65	30	"The Good Companions"	June 23, 1950

== See also ==
- 1948-49 United States network television schedule
- 1949-50 United States network television schedule
