= Window on the World =

- Starring: Gil Lamb; Irene Manning
- Country of origin: United States

Production
- Running time: 30 minutes

Original release
- Network: DuMont
- Release: January 27 – April 14, 1949

Window on the World is an American variety show which aired on the now-defunct DuMont Television Network. The program aired from January 27, 1949, to April 14, 1949. Each episode was 30 minutes long.

== Overview ==
Each episode featured performers from various countries, with film clips of exotic locales. Merle Kendrick conducted the orchestra. Other featured performers included comedian Gil Lamb and actress Irene Manning. The program, produced and distributed by DuMont, aired Thursday nights at 9 pm Eastern Time on most DuMont affiliates.

== Episode status ==
The UCLA Film and Television Archive holds one episode from March 25, 1949.

== See also ==
- List of programs broadcast by the DuMont Television Network
- List of surviving DuMont Television Network broadcasts

== Bibliography ==
- David Weinstein, The Forgotten Network: DuMont and the Birth of American Television (Philadelphia: Temple University Press, 2004) ISBN 1-59213-245-6
- Alex McNeil, Total Television, Fourth edition (New York: Penguin Books, 1980) ISBN 0-14-024916-8
- Tim Brooks and Earle Marsh, The Complete Directory to Prime Time Network and Cable TV Shows 1946–Present, Ninth edition (New York: Ballantine Books, 2007) ISBN 978-0-345-49773-4
