= Theatre of the Mind (TV series) =

American TV anthology series (1949)

Theatre of the Mind is an American psychological drama anthology series produced by Fred Coe and Ann Marlowe for the National Broadcasting Company (NBC). Episodes dealt with emotional problems that might occur in homes. Six 30-minute episodes were produced and aired on NBC from July 14 to September 15, 1949. Each story was followed by a discussion led by moderator Dr. Houston Peterson and featuring Dr. Marina Farnum, Dr. Edward Strecher, and Claire Savage Littledale, then editor of Parents Magazine.

Actors included Lilia Skala, Faye Emerson, and Ilka Chase. Among its directors was Delbert Mann, later to win an Academy Award for directing Marty (film).

Marlowe was the show's writer. The show was broadcast on Thursdays, initially from 9:30 to 10 p.m. Eastern Time. In August 1949 it was moved to 9 to 9:30 E.T.

Theatre of the Mind was an experimental effort by a then-new creative program department at NBC. Network executives planned to make the show a regular series if the experiment was successful.

== Critical response ==
A review in the trade publication Variety called Theatre of the Mind "a laudable endeavor", acknowledging that covering psychological material in 30 minutes was a challenge. The review added that the problem was presented in an entertaining way and comments from the panel of experts were "on a level readily understood by the layman."
