= Wesley (TV series) =

- Country of origin: United States
- Original language: English

Production
- Running time: 30 minutes

Original release
- Network: CBS
- Release: May 8 – August 30, 1949

Wesley is an early American sitcom that aired live on CBS from May 8, 1949 to August 30, 1949.

== Premise ==
The series centered on 12-year-old Wesley Eggleston, who lived in a small rural community, and his family, including his sister Elizabeth.

== Production ==
Sam Taylor wrote the series, which was initially broadcast on Sundays from 7:30 to 8 p.m. Eastern Time.

== Cast ==
- Donald Devlin as Wesley Eggleston-May–July
- Johnny Steward as Wesley Eggleston-July–August
- Frank Thomas as Mr. Eggleston
- Mona Thomas as Mrs. Eggleston
- Joy Reece as Elizabeth Eggleston
- Joe Sweeney as Grandpa
- Billie Nevard as Wesley's friend
- Jack Ayres as Elizabeth's boyfriend
