= Café de Paris (TV series) =

American TV musical variety series (1949)

- Starring: Sylvie St. Clair; Jacques Aubuchon; Stan Free Trio
- Country of origin: United States

Production
- Running time: 15 minutes

Original release
- Network: DuMont
- Release: January 17 – March 4, 1949

Café de Paris is an American musical variety show broadcast on the DuMont Television Network. The 15-minute program ran on Mondays, Wednesdays, and Fridays from January 17. 1949, to March 4, 1949.

== Premise ==
Singer Sylvie St. Claire was the host of a Paris nightclub that she inherited. She hired the Stan Free Trio to perform in the club, after which she obtained a contract for television broadcasts, which provided funds to keep the club in operation. Jacques Aubuchon also was featured.

== Production ==
Byron McKinney was the director. The length and scheduling of the program varied. At times it was 15 minutes long and broadcast on Mondays, Wednesdays, and Fridays. Beginning March 7, 1949, it was shown on Tuesdays from 8 to 8:30 p.m. Eastern Time.

None of the episodes are known to survive.

== See also ==
- List of programs broadcast by the DuMont Television Network
- List of surviving DuMont Television Network broadcasts

== Bibliography ==
- David Weinstein, The Forgotten Network: DuMont and the Birth of American Television (Philadelphia: Temple University Press, 2004) ISBN 1-59213-245-6
- Tim Brooks and Earle Marsh, The Complete Directory to Prime Time Network TV Shows, Third edition (New York: Ballantine Books, 1964) ISBN 0-345-31864-1
