= Photocrime =

American TV crime drama

Photocrime is an American television crime drama that was broadcast on ABC from September 28, 1949, until December 14, 1949. The program was also known as Look Photocrime.

The program's title and premise -- "that photographs often possess clues that are often overlooked" initially -- came from an illustrated fictional crime series that ran in Look magazine, and the program was produced in association with Look. However, the concept of an illustrated mystery began with Denis Horton, an insurance clerk in England. The Weekly Illustrated published the first Photocrime in 1935. By 1937, Photocrime was also printed in a number of American newspapers.

Chuck Webster portrayed police inspector Hannibal Cobb. Murray Burnett was the producer and writer. Babette Henry was the director, and Mildred Fenton was the producer.

Photocrime originated from WJZ-TV. Lack of a sponsor brought the program to an end after 13 weeks.

== Critical reaction ==
In a review in the trade publication Billboard, Leon Morse wrote that the program's premiere episode "represented a measure of noticeable but not spectacular progress in bringing mysteries to the video screen."

The "Television Daily" section of the trade publication Radio Daily welcomed the program's main character as "a near-anomaly, a quiet police detective with enough ability and intelligence to get his man."

== Other versions ==
An unsuccessful pilot episode of a program dramatizing material from the Photocrimes in Look was broadcast on CBS on October 2, 1945.

In 1958, Teleworld, Inc., announced plans to produce a series of 5-minute television programs titled Photocrimes and based on the magazine feature of the same name. Plans called for 260 episodes to be produced.
