= Dennis James =

American television personality (1917–1997)

- James hosting the syndicated version of The Price Is Right in 1975
- Born: Demie James Sposa; August 24, 1917; Jersey City, New Jersey, U.S.
- Died: June 3, 1997 (aged 79); Palm Springs, California, U.S.
- Resting place: Forest Lawn Memorial Park (Hollywood Hills)
- Occupations: Actor; Television personality Game show host Announcer
- Years active: 1937–1997
- Spouse: Micki Crawford
- Children: 3

Dennis James (born Demie James Sposa, August 24, 1917 – June 3, 1997) was an American television personality, philanthropist, and commercial spokesman. Until 1976, he had appeared on TV more times and for a longer period than any other television star. Alternately referred to as "The Dean of Game Show Hosts" (along with fellow emcee Bill Cullen) and the "Godfather of Gameshows", he was the host of television's first network game show, the DuMont Network's Cash and Carry (1946).

James was also the first person to host a telethon (raising more than $750,000,000 for United Cerebral Palsy throughout his nearly five decade run as its host), the first to appear in a television commercial (for Wedgwood china), first to emcee a variety show, and first to appear on video tape; more than 25 "firsts" in all.

== Early career and life ==
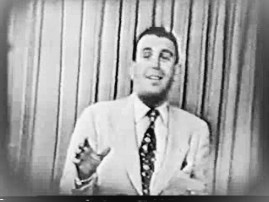
Hosting Okay, Mother, c.1950

James was born to Demetrio Ernest Sposa and Teresa Amorosi, both of Italian descent. Born in Jersey City, New Jersey, James joined that city's WAAT as an announcer and moved in May 1940 to WNEW in New York City (now WBBR). He was soon hosting a morning show called Breakfast With Bamberger's Basement. He went into television, appearing in 1943 on the first anniversary program of W2XVW, which eventually became WABD, the flagship station of the DuMont Television Network in 1946 (WABD is now Fox-owned WNYW). By mid-July 1943, he had taken over as host of DuMont's renamed fledgling Wednesday night variety show, Television Roof. By September, programming was drastically curtailed on all New York stations due to the war. On April 15, 1946, WABD opened new studios at Wanamaker's department store and on the 18th, James appeared in an episode of Famous Jury Trials.

James became the host of many game shows; his first was WABD's DuMont Beepstakes on May 29, 1946, followed on June 20 with the more successful Cash and Carry from the same program packager, Carr and Stark. Later he appeared on the ABC version of Chance of a Lifetime (1952–53), and served as commentator for DuMont's wrestling and boxing shows, such as Boxing From Jamaica Arena (1948–49) and Amateur Boxing Fight Club (1949–50). He hosted the DuMont daytime variety show Okay, Mother (1948–51) with Julia Meade.

James often addressed the TV audience as "Mother", a practice he had begun when discussing the finer points of wrestling during his sports broadcasts. He feared the men in the audience would be insulted by the implication that they didn't already know the rules (even if they didn't), but would accept that James was merely explaining things for the benefit of women watching.

== Game show career ==
James started his game show hosting career with the first network game show, Cash and Carry, on the DuMont network from 1946 to 1947. During the 1953–54 season, James was the announcer of the quiz program Judge for Yourself, which aired on NBC, with Fred Allen as the emcee.

In 1956, he and Bert Parks hosted the ABC musical game show Stop the Music. In 1956, James emceed High Finance on CBS in which contestants answered current events questions to build up a jackpot for prizes.

James also appeared with Bill Leyden in the 1962–64 NBC quiz program Your First Impression. James's game show hosting duties spanned four decades, as he presided over shows such as The Name's the Same, Haggis Baggis, People Will Talk, and PDQ, and the talent shows Chance of a Lifetime and Your All-American College Show. James was the official commercial presenter of the one-episode You're in the Picture, and appeared on the subsequent "apology" episode as well. His last new game show hosting gig was the NBC daytime revival of Name That Tune (1974–75).

James was a regular substitute host for Monty Hall on Let's Make a Deal beginning in January 1972, when he caught the attention of Mark Goodson and Bill Todman, who were putting together The New Price Is Right for syndication; the new format would incorporate the original format from 1956 to 1965 with elements from Let's Make a Deal. James and Goodson co-hosted a promotional film, selling stations on the 1972 revival of the show, which was originally hosted by James's fellow TV pioneer Bill Cullen. CBS (at the time re-entering the game show market after four years without any) agreed to pick up a daytime version of the show, but, due to contractual obligations, asked Truth or Consequences host Bob Barker, to host. Barker took the daytime show, which he hosted until 2007, while James hosted a weekly version for the syndicated market, which usually aired on local stations in the "access period" leading into prime time and was thus known as "the nighttime Price Is Right". On the nighttime Price Is Right, James was reunited with another DuMont Television Network host, Johnny Olson, who served as announcer. James hosted the weekly show from 1972 to 1977; he also filled in for Barker during four daytime episodes in December 1974, becoming the first substitute host of the CBS version. James's departure from the nighttime show in 1977 marked the end of his game show career.

== Other work ==
Outside of sports and game shows, James was also held in high esteem as a commercial spokesman. His clients included Old Gold cigarettes, Kellogg's cereals and, through his own production company, local and regional companies and businesses around the country. James was the spokesman for Physicians Mutual Insurance Company from 1971 to 1997. His expression "Okay? Okay!" became a trademark in many of James's commercials. James's friend Andy Granatelli hired him to serve as the original commercial spokesperson for Tune-up Masters.

James hosted the first telethon using the then-new television medium to raise money for charity. He was the emcee of the United Cerebral Palsy Association's telethons. James hosted the charity's primary telethon (in New York City on WOR-TV (now WWOR-TV) for 47 years, aided by Jane Pickens, Paul Anka, Florence Henderson, and other performers. He also hosted telethons in major cities all over the United States on a monthly basis from 1950 until 1979. When the telethon went national in 1979 with John Ritter as M.C. in Los Angeles, UCP enlisted James as a national presenter, in addition to James's duties as the anchor of the New York City version, which was also seen on cable all over the U.S. via WOR-TV. His son Brad appeared on the telethons for over a decade, interviewing some of UCP's clients. When James died in 1997, Brad and Florence Henderson came back to host the telethon for the last time in January 1998.

James also appeared as the host of "Your College All-Star Show" that included a notable appearance in June 1968 by Karen and Richard Carpenter (their first) along with Bill Sissoyev forming "The Dick Carpenter Trio" (as they were known at that time) that included then-18 year old Karen doing a drum solo (well before Richard and Karen became The Carpenters.

As an actor, James guest starred in numerous television series and dramas. Some of those include 77 Sunset Strip, Problem Playhouse, Batman, Oh Madeline, Rich Man, Poor Man and Fantasy Island.

On the big screen, James appeared in Mister Universe, The One and Only, Rocky III, and his last film appearance, The Method, in 1996.

James bought a home in Palm Springs, California, in 1980. He was then called on to host dozens of charity events a year in the Palm Springs area, including events for Childhelp International, the Frank Sinatra Golf Classic, and the Bob Hope Desert Classic. In 1996, a Golden Palm Star on the Walk of Stars was dedicated to him.

For his contribution to the television industry, Dennis James has a star on the Hollywood Walk of Fame located at 6753 Hollywood Boulevard. Hundreds came to the dedication and many luminaries got up and spoke, including Bob Hope, Foster Brooks and Kevin Dobson.

United Cerebral Palsy's office in California's Inland Empire is known as the Dennis James Center, and in 1996, James began organizing a golf fundraiser near his home. His widow and children continued with the tournament, which is named in his honor. Fellow game show host Jack Narz's son David has been actively involved with the office and the James tournament. Through the years dozens of James's close friends have come out to support the event, including Monty Hall, Jack Narz, Tom Kennedy, Peter Marshall and Joe Pesci.

In 2017 the book, OK? OK! Dennis James' Lifetime of Firsts, by Adam Nedeff, was published.

== Death ==
James died on June 3, 1997, from lung cancer at his home in Palm Springs. His remains are interred at the Forest Lawn Memorial Park in Hollywood Hills, Los Angeles.

== Filmography ==
Year	Title	Role	Notes
1951	Mister Universe	Announcer	
1978	The One and Only	Himself	
1982	Rocky III	Wrestling Commentator #1	
1996	The Method	Dean Harrison	(final film role)
