= Musical Merry-Go-Round =

Musical Merry-Go-Round is an NBC TV series which aired from July 25, 1947, to 1949. The series featured live music performances.

== Production history ==
The program was originally titled Disc Magic. The program was one of the first to use a disc-jockey format on television. It supplemented recorded music with live acts, to "add vaudeville-like embellishments to eliminate the possible monotony of just watching records spin". Each episode was hosted by Jack Kilty, "who sat in front of the camera and played records." Disc Magic was broadcast from July 25, 1947 through September 1947 on Fridays from 8 to 8:30 p.m. Eastern Time.

Musical Merry-Go-Round was an early incarnation of music videos on TV. It was renamed from its predecessor, a groundbreaking series called Disc Magic. Martin Block, the orchestra leader, hosted as one of the emcees presenting musical performances.

In October 1947 the format was changed; records were eliminated, and the show presented only live acts. Regular elements of episodes were songs by Kilty and a female vocalist (Eve Young in 1947, Penny Gerard in 1948-1949) and segments by actor Fritz DeWilde. Guests were usually relatively unknown performers at that time. They included Kyle MacDonnell.

Musical Merry-Go-Round was initially broadcast on Thursdays from 8 to 8:30 p.m. E. T. In January 1948 it was moved to Fridays from 7:45 to 8 p.m. E. T. In February 1948 its time slot was shifted to 7:30 to 7:50 p.m. E. T. (still on Fridays). It remained at that time until it ended on March 11, 1949.

== See also ==
- 1947-48 United States network television schedule (Thursdays at 8:30pm ET)
- 1948-49 United States network television schedule (Fridays at 7:30pm ET)
