= The Family Genius =

- Country of origin: United States
- No. of episodes: 4

Original release
- Network: DuMont
- Release: September 9 – September 30, 1949

The Family Genius is a TV series aired in the United States from September 9 to September 30, 1949. The series was broadcast on the DuMont Television Network, and is most notable for lasting less than a month before cancellation.

== Plot ==
The series was a sitcom centered around the Howard family, in which young son Tommy was a child prodigy.

== Cast ==
- Jack Diamond as Tommy Howard
- Phyllis Lowe as Mrs. Howard
- Arthur Edwards as Mr. Howard

== Episode status ==
As with most DuMont series, no episodes are known to exist.

== Bibliography ==
- David Weinstein, The Forgotten Network: DuMont and the Birth of American Television (Philadelphia: Temple University Press, 2004) ISBN 1-59213-245-6
- Alex McNeil, Total Television, Fourth edition (New York: Penguin Books, 1980) ISBN 0-14-024916-8
- Tim Brooks and Earle Marsh, The Complete Directory to Prime Time Network TV Shows, Third edition (New York: Ballantine Books, 1964) ISBN 0-345-31864-1

== See also ==
- List of programs broadcast by the DuMont Television Network
- List of surviving DuMont Television Network broadcasts
