= Saturday Night at the Garden =

- Genre: Sports
- Presented by: Curt Gowdy; Don Dunphy
- Country of origin: United States
- Original language: English

Production
- Running time: 120/150 minutes

Original release
- Network: DuMont
- Release: October 7, 1950 – March 31, 1951

Saturday Night at the Garden is an American sports series broadcast by the DuMont Television Network from October 7, 1950, to March 31, 1951. The program aired sports, primarily basketball, horse show, rodeo, and boxing live from Madison Square Garden in New York City. The program aired Saturday nights at 9 pm ET and was 120 to 150 minutes long. The series was hosted by sportscaster Curt Gowdy and long time boxing blow-by-blow announcer Don Dunphy.

== Episode status ==
As with most DuMont series, no episodes are known to exist. Some episodes may exist under the title Boxing with Dennis James at the UCLA Film and Television Archive.

== See also ==
- List of programs broadcast by the DuMont Television Network
- List of surviving DuMont Television Network broadcasts
- 1950-51 United States network television schedule

== Bibliography ==
- David Weinstein, The Forgotten Network: DuMont and the Birth of American Television (Philadelphia: Temple University Press, 2004) ISBN 1-59213-245-6
- Alex McNeil, Total Television, Fourth edition (New York: Penguin Books, 1980) ISBN 0-14-024916-8
