= Jack Gould =

American journalist and critic

John Ludlow Gould (February 5, 1914 – May 24, 1993) was an American journalist and critic, who wrote radio and television reviews and commentary for The New York Times from 1937 until 1972.

== Early life and education ==
Gould was born in New York City into a socially prominent family and attended the Loomis School.

== Career ==
He started as a copy boy at the New York Herald Tribune in 1932. In 1937, he moved to The New York Times, writing for the drama department and also writing about radio in the 1940s. In 1944, he became the newspaper's radio critic, and in 1948, the chief television reporter and critic. At one point, he had eight people working under him. In the early 1960s, he was a CBS executive for a short time but returned to the Times.

Gould's columns and reviews (along with those of rival John Crosby of the Herald Tribune) were widely read by decision-makers in the fledgling medium of television, and Gould had many professional and personal relationships with prominent industry figures such as Edward R. Murrow and Fred Friendly. He did not hold back harsh criticism, even when The New York Times itself produced its own public affairs program in 1963; He was aware of the potential power of television as a force for social good. His colleagues dubbed him "the conscience of the industry", to his own embarrassment.

Gould lived on MacDougal Street in Greenwich Village and later in Old Greenwich, Connecticut, where, according to his obituary in The New York Times, his office contained "a shortwave radio, two telephones, a small black book of unlisted telephone numbers, and a typewriter". After retiring in 1972, he moved to California. In 1993, he died in Concord at the age of 79. In 1938 he married Carmen Letitia Lewis and they were the parents of three sons.

== Honors ==
Gould won numerous awards, including the George Polk Memorial Award, a Page One Award (both 1953) and a special Peabody Award (1957, citing his "fairness, objectivity, and authority").
