= 1948 in American television =

This is a list of American television-related events in 1948.

== Events ==
Date	Event	Ref.
March 4	The C. E. Hooper Company releases the first-ever American television ratings.	
April 3	The NBC Symphony Orchestra, conducted by Robert Shaw, is first telecast. In this broadcast, Beethoven's Symphony No. 9 is played in its entirety for the first time on television, and in concert.	
April 18	The American Broadcasting Company begins operations as a television network, with its New York City-based station WJZ-TV serving as network flagship.	
May 3	CBS Television News premieres as the first network nightly newscast, hosted by journalist Douglas Edwards.	
June 21	The 1948 Republican National Convention in Philadelphia, Pennsylvania becomes the first political convention to be telecast by the networks.	
July 30	The DuMont Television Network becomes the first network to televise professional wrestling in prime time.	
November	Screen Gems was founded as the television subsidiary of Columbia Pictures Corporation.	
November 25	CBS broadcasts its earliest known national telecast of the Macy's Thanksgiving Day Parade.	
November 29	CBS telecasts the first broadcast of a roller derby match.	
Unknown date	Ziv Television Programs was created by Frederick Ziv as a subsidiary of the Ziv Company, in order to specialize in the production of original television programs for syndication	

=== Other television events in 1948 ===
- CBS begins television network programming.
- The number of homes in the United States with a television set reaches one million.

== Television programs ==
=== Debuts ===
Date	Debut	Network
January	Camera Headlines	DuMont
January	I.N.S. Telenews	DuMont
January 9	Playroom	DuMont
January 18	The Original Amateur Hour	DuMont
February 9	Court of Current Issues	DuMont
March 4	Stop Me If You've Heard This One	NBC
March 9	The Johns Hopkins Science Review	CBS
April 4	Author Meets the Critics	NBC
April 14	Scoreboard	DuMont
April 15	For Your Pleasure	NBC
April 15	Hollywood Screen Test	ABC
May 21	What's It Worth	CBS
June 1	We the People	CBS
June 8	Texaco Star Theater	NBC
June 20	The Ed Sullivan Show	CBS
July 4	Key to the Missing	DuMont
August 10	Candid Camera	ABC
August 11	Quizzing the News	ABC
August 11	The Laytons	DuMont
August 12	Club Seven	ABC
August 15	CBS Television News	CBS
August 16	Places Please	CBS
August 23	Foodini the Great	CBS
August 27	Teenage Book Club	ABC
September 6	Champagne and Orchids	DuMont
September 21	Operation Success	DuMont
September 26	Actors Studio	ABC
September 26	Stained Glass Windows	unknown
September 27	The Chevrolet Tele-Theatre	NBC
October 3	The Philco Television Playhouse	NBC
October 17	The Ford Television Theatre	CBS
October 19	Off the Record	DuMont
October 20	The Growing Paynes	DuMont
October 22	Break the Bank	ABC
October 29	Tales of the Red Caboose	DuMont
November 1	Okay, Mother	WABD
November 1	Your Television Babysitter	Dumont
November 1	TV Shopper	Dumont
November 1	Amanda	Dumont
November 4	The Adventures of Oky Doky	Dumont
November 4	Fashions on Parade	
November 7	Newsweek Views the News	DuMont
November 7	Studio One	CBS
November 20	Celebrity Time	CBS
November 21	Lamp Unto My Feet	CBS
December 6	Arthur Godfrey's Talent Scouts	CBS
December 17	The Morey Amsterdam Show	CBS
Unknown date	The Alan Dale Show	Dumont
Unknown date	The Philco Television Playhouse	NBC
Unknown date	The Stan Shaw Show	Dumont
Unknown date	Your School Reporter	Dumont
Unknown date	Wrestling From Columbia Park Arena	Dumont
Unknown date	Wrestling From Jamaica Arena	Dumont
Unknown date	The Needle Shop	Dumont

=== Changes of network affiliation ===
Show	Moved from	Moved to
Author Meets the Critics	NBC	ABC
Mary Kay and Johnny	DuMont	NBC

=== Ending this year ===
Date	Show	Network	Debut	Notes
January	The Walter Compton News	DuMont	June 16, 1947	
May 9	Playroom	DuMont	January 9, 1948	
June 30	In the Kelvinator Kitchen	NBC	May 21, 1947	
October 29	Teenage Book Club	ABC	August 27, 1948	
Unknown date	The World in Your Home	NBC	December 22, 1944	

== Networks and services ==
=== Network launches ===
Network	Launch date	Source
ABC	April 18	
CBS	May	

== Television stations ==
=== Station launches ===
Date	City of License/Market	Station	Channel	Affiliation	Notes/Ref.
February 9	Cincinnati, Ohio	WLWT	5	NBC (primary); CBS/ABC/DuMont (secondary)	Successor to experimental station W8XCT.
March 11	Baltimore, Maryland	WBAL-TV	11	NBC	
April 5	Chicago, Illinois	WGN-TV	9	Independent (primary); CBS/DuMont (secondary)	
April 19	Salt Lake City, Utah	KDYL-TV	4	NBC	
April 22	Richmond, Virginia	WTVR-TV	6	NBC (primary); ABC/DuMont (secondary)	
April 27	Minneapolis, Minnesota	KSTP-TV	5	NBC (primary); DuMont (secondary)	
May 6	Los Angeles, California	KTSL	2	DuMont	Now KCBS-TV, a CBS O&O station
May 14	Buffalo, New York	WBEN-TV	4	NBC (primary); ABC/DuMont (secondary)	Now a CBS affiliate since 1949
May 15	Newark, New Jersey (New York City, New York)	WATV	13	Independent	
May 23	Philadelphia, Pennsylvania	WCAU-TV	10	CBS	
June 9	Boston, Massachusetts	WBZ-TV	4	NBC (primary); ABC/DuMont (secondary)	
June 15	New Haven/Hartford, Connecticut	WNHC-TV	6 (now 8)	DuMont (primary); ABC (secondary)	
June 15	New York City	WPIX	11	Independent	
June 21	Boston, Massachusetts	WNAC-TV	7	CBS (primary); ABC/DuMont (secondary)	Defunct May 22, 1982
July 21	Toledo, Ohio	WSPD-TV	13	NBC	
August 10	New York City	WJZ-TV	7	ABC (O&O)	
August 25	Los Angeles, California	KFI-TV	9	Independent	
September 17	Chicago, Illinois	WENR-TV	7	ABC ((O&O)	
September 17	Los Angeles, California	KLAC-TV	13	Independent	
September 29	Atlanta, Georgia	WSB-TV	8 (now on 2)	NBC	
September 29	Fort Worth/Dallas, Texas	WBAP-TV	5	NBC (primary); ABC (secondary)	
October 8	Chicago, Illinois	WNBQ	5	NBC	
October 9	Detroit, Michigan	WXYZ-TV	7	ABC (O&O)	
October 24	Detroit, Michigan	WJBK	2	CBS (primary); DuMont (Secondary)	
October 31	Cleveland, Ohio	WNBK	3	NBC	
November 1	Baltimore, Maryland	WAAM	13	ABC	
November 24	Louisville, Kentucky	WAVE-TV	5 (now 3)	NBC (primary); CBS/ABC/DuMont (secondary)	
November 25	Seattle, Washington	KRSC-TV	5	CBS (primary); DuMont (secondary)	
November 29	Albuquerque, New Mexico	KOB-TV	4	NBC (primary); ABC/CBS/DuMont (secondary)	
December 1	Syracuse, New York	WHEN-TV	5	CBS (primary); NBC/DuMont (secondary)	
December 11	Memphis, Tennessee	WMCT	4 (now 5)	NBC (primary); ABC/CBS/DuMont (secondary)	
December 18	New Orleans, Louisiana	WDSU-TV	6	NBC (primary); DuMont/CBS/ABC (secondary)	
December 22	San Francisco, California	KPIX-TV	5	CBS (primary); NBC/DuMont/Paramount (secondary)	

=== Network affiliation changes ===
Date	City of license/Market	Station	Channel	Old affiliation	New affiliation	Notes/Ref.
October	New Haven/Hartford, Connecticut	WNHC-TV	6 (now 8)	DuMont	CBS	Retains DuMont affiliation on secondary basis until 1956
