= 1948–49 United States network television schedule =

The 1948–49 network television schedule for the four major English language commercial broadcast networks in the United States. The schedule covers primetime hours from September 1948 through March 1949. The schedule is followed by a list per network of returning series, new series, and series cancelled after the 1947–48 season. This was the first season in which all four networks then in operation in the United States offered nightly prime time schedules Monday through Friday.

The schedule below reflects the fall lineup as it all settled into place throughout October 1948, before any subsequent time changes were made and additional new series appeared in November.

New fall series are highlighted in bold. A number of ABC's new fall shows began as early as mid-August when the network first began broadcasting a seven-night schedule. CBS and DuMont also had some new shows begin in the latter half of August. These shows are noted as such by (Aug.). NBC began airing Saturday Night Jamboree in December.

Several notable programs debuted during the season and within the preceding summer. The preservation of these telecasts on kinescope film vary. The Texaco Star Theater proved to be one of the most notable hits of the year with its host, Milton Berle, credited with encouraging consumers to purchase their first television set. The 1948 episodes of the Berle show are missing, but many of the 1949 episodes still exist. A short-lived series, The Laytons, was the first network television sitcom to feature an African-American in a regular supporting role, albeit a stereotypical one. No episodes have survived. The Morey Amsterdam Show, which debuted on CBS in December, introduced television audiences to Art Carney as a lead cast member. In the David Weinstein book, The Forgotten Network, similarities between Carney's role as "Charlie the Doorman" and his later Ed Norton from Cavalcade of Stars and The Honeymooners are noted. The Morey Amsterdam Show was not a ratings success. Four episodes are held by the UCLA Film and Television Archive. Toast of the Town, debuting in June 1948 and re-titled The Ed Sullivan Show in 1955 and a mainstay of Sunday night viewing, became one of the most successful and long-running programs in American television history. It would remain on the air until 1971. The premiere episode with composers Richard Rodgers and Oscar Hammerstein II and the comedy team of Dean Martin and Jerry Lewis are among the few missing telecasts.

== Legend ==
- Light blue indicates local programming.
- Dark blue indicates news programming.
- Light green indicates sporting events.
- Light purple indicates movies.

== Sunday ==
Network	7:00 p.m.	7:30 p.m.	8:00 p.m.	8:30 p.m.	9:00 p.m.	9:30 p.m.	10:00 p.m.	10:30 p.m.
ABC	Local programming	**The Southernaires Quartet**	Hollywood Screen Test	**Actors Studio**	Local programming			
CBS	**The Week in Review** (7:00) / Local programming (7:15)	**Ford Television Theatre Hour** (monthly)		Local programming	Toast of the Town		**America Speaks** (10:00) / Local programming (10:15)	Local programming
DMN	The Original Amateur Hour		Local programming					
NBC	Mary Kay and Johnny (7:00) / Review of the Week (7:20)	**Admiral Presents the Five Star Revue — Welcome Aboard**	Author Meets the Critics	Meet the Press	**The Philco Television Playhouse**		Local programming	

Notes: Toast of the Town, later known as The Ed Sullivan Show, premiered June 20, 1948, at 9:00 p.m. on CBS.

On DuMont, King Cole's Birthday Party, also known as simply Birthday Party, aired from 6:00 to 6:30 p.m. Eastern Time from March to May 1949.

== Monday ==
Network		7:00 p.m.	7:30 p.m.	8:00 p.m.	8:30 p.m.	9:00 p.m.	9:30 p.m.	10:00 p.m.	10:30 p.m.
ABC		News and Views (7:00) / Local Programming (7:15)	Kiernan's Corner	Quizzing the News	Local Programming				
CBS		Local Programming (7:00) / Places Please (7:15)	CBS Television News (7:30) / Face the Music (7:45)	Local programming					
DMN		Doorway to Fame	Camera Headlines (7:30) / Local programming (7:45)	**Champagne and Orchids** (8:00) / Local programming (8:15)	Local programming		Court of Current Issues	Local programming	
NBC	Fall	Local programming	America Song (7:30) / Camel Newsreel Theatre (7:50)	**The Chevrolet Tele-Theatre**	Americana	Local programming (9:00) / Boxing From St. Nicholas Arena (9:10)			
NBC	Winter	Local programming	America Song (7:30) / Camel Newsreel Theatre (7:50)	**The Chevrolet Tele-Theatre**	**Colgate Theatre**	Local programming (9:00) / Boxing From St. Nicholas Arena (9:10)			

Notes: Beginning July 18, 1949, The Magic Cottage aired on DuMont Monday through Friday from 6:30 to 7:00 p.m. Eastern Time. On NBC, Colgate Theatre premiered on January 3, 1949.

== Tuesday ==
Network	7:00 p.m.	7:30 p.m.	8:00 p.m.	8:30 p.m.	9:00 p.m.	9:30 p.m.	10:00 p.m.	10:30 p.m.
ABC	News and Views (7:00) / Local programming (7:15)	Movieland Quiz	Local programming	**America's Town Meeting**		Local programming		
CBS	**The Roar of the Rails** (7:00) / Local programming (7:15)	CBS Television News (7:30) / Face the Music (7:45)	Local programming		We the People	People's Platform	Local programming	
DMN	**The Alan Dale Show** (7:00) / Local programming (7:15)	Camera Headlines (7:30) / I.N.S. Telenews (7:45)	**Operation Success**	Local programming	Boxing From Jamaica Arena			
NBC	Local programming	Musical Miniatures (7:30) / Camel Newsreel Theatre (7:50)	Texaco Star Theater		**Mary Margaret McBride**	Local programming	**Wrestling From St. Nicholas Arena**	

Note: Beginning July 18, 1949, The Magic Cottage aired on DuMont Monday through Friday from 6:30 to 7:00 p.m. Eastern Time.

== Wednesday ==
Network		7:00 p.m.	7:30 p.m.	8:00 p.m.	8:30 p.m.	9:00 p.m.	9:30 p.m.	10:00 p.m.	10:30 p.m.
ABC		News and Views (7:00) / Local programming (7:15)	Critic at Large	The Gay Nineties Revue	Candid Microphone (8:30) / Three About Town (8:45)	Local programming	Wrestling From Washington, D.C.		
CBS		Local programming (7:00) / Places Please (7:15)	CBS Television News (7:30) / Face the Music (7:45)	**Kobbs' Korner**	Winner Take All	**Tournament of Champions**			
DMN	Fall	King Cole's Birthday Party	Camera Headlines (7:30) / Local programming (7:45)	**The Laytons** (Aug.)	**The Growing Paynes**	**Boxing From Jamaica Arena**			
DMN	Mid-fall	King Cole's Birthday Party	Camera Headlines (7:30) / Local programming (7:45)		**The Growing Paynes**	**Boxing From Jamaica Arena**			
DMN	Spring		Camera Headlines (7:30) / Local programming (7:45)		**The Growing Paynes**	**Boxing From Jamaica Arena**			
NBC	Fall	Local programming	You Are an Artist (7:30) / Camel Newsreel Theatre (7:50)	**Girl About Town**	**The Ted Steele Show** (8:30) / Story of the Week (8:45)	Kraft Television Theatre		Local programming (10:00) / Village Barn (10:10)	
NBC	Mid-fall	Local programming	You Are an Artist (7:30) / Camel Newsreel Theatre (7:50)	**Picture This**	**The Ted Steele Show** (8:30) / Story of the Week (8:45)	Kraft Television Theatre		Local programming (10:00) / Village Barn (10:10)	
NBC	Summer	Local programming	You Are an Artist (7:30) / Camel Newsreel Theatre (7:50)	**Picture This**	**The Black Robe**	Kraft Television Theatre		Local programming (10:00) / Village Barn (10:10)	

Notes: On DuMont, King Cole's Birthday Party also was known as simply Birthday Party. The Laytons only lasted 10 episodes, from August 11 to October 13, 1948. Beginning July 18, 1949, The Magic Cottage aired on DuMont Monday through Friday from 6:30 to 7:00 p.m. Eastern Time.

On NBC, Picture This, hosted by Wendy Barrie, aired November 17, 1948, to February 9, 1949. The Black Robe debuted on May 18, 1949, and ran from 8:30 p.m. to 9:00 p.m. on Wednesday until it began to air at various times on Mondays during August 1949.

== Thursday ==
Network		7:00 p.m.	7:30 p.m.	8:00 p.m.	8:30 p.m.	9:00 p.m.	9:30 p.m.	10:00 p.m.	10:30 p.m.
ABC	Fall	News and Views (7:00) / Local programming (7:15)	Local programming		Club Seven	**ABC Feature Film**		Local programming	
ABC	Summer	News and Views (7:00) / Local programming (7:15)	**Blind Date**	Local programming	Club Seven	**ABC Feature Film**		Local programming	
ABC	Mid-summer	News and Views (7:00) / Local programming (7:15)		Local programming	Club Seven		**Blind Date**	Local programming	
CBS		Local programming	CBS Television News (7:30) / Face the Music (7:45)	To the Queen's Taste	Local programming				
DMN	Fall	The Adventures of Oky Doky	Camera Headlines (7:30) / The Jack Eigen Show (7:45)	Local programming	Charade Quiz	**Wrestling From Columbia Park Arena**			
DMN	Summer	King Cole's Birthday Party	Camera Headlines (7:30) / The Jack Eigen Show (7:45)	Local programming	Charade Quiz	**Wrestling From Columbia Park Arena**			
NBC		Local programming	**NBC Presents** (7:30) / **Girl of the Week** (7:45) / Camel Newsreel Theatre (7:50)	**Princess Sagaphi** (8:00) / The Nature of Things (8:15)	The Swift Show	**The Gulf Road Show Starring Bob Smith**	The Bigelow Show	Local programming`	

Notes: On ABC, Blind Date debuted on May 5, 1949, airing from 7:30 to 8:00 p.m. Eastern Time. It moved to 9:30 p.m. during July 1949 and aired in that time slot into September 1949.

On DuMont, King Cole's Birthday Party also was known as simply Birthday Party. Beginning July 18, 1949, The Magic Cottage aired on DuMont Monday through Friday from 6:30 to 7:00 p.m. Eastern Time.

== Friday ==
Network		7:00 p.m.	7:30 p.m.	8:00 p.m.	8:30 p.m.	9:00 p.m.	9:30 p.m.	10:00 p.m.	10:30 p.m.
ABC		News and Views (7:00) / Local programming (7:15)	**Tales of the Red Caboose** (7:30) / Local programming (7:45)	Teenage Book Club	That Reminds Me	**Break the Bank**	Local programming		
CBS		Local programming (7:00) / Places Please (7:15)	CBS Television News (7:30) / Face the Music (7:45)	Sportsman's Quiz (8:00) / What's It Worth (8:05)	**Captain Billy's Mississippi Music Hall**	Local programming			
DMN		Key to the Missing	Camera Headlines (7:30) / Local programming (7:45)	**Fashions on Parade**	Local programming	Wrestling From Jamaica Arena			
NBC	Fall	Local programming	Musical Merry-Go-Round (7:30) / Camel Newsreel Theatre (7:50)	Musical Miniatures	Stop Me If You've Heard This One	**The Ted Steele Show** (9:00) / Local programming (9:15)	Gillette Cavalcade of Sports (9:30) / **Greatest Fights of the Century** (10:45)		
NBC	Winter	Local programming	Musical Merry-Go-Round (7:30) / Camel Newsreel Theatre (7:50)	Your Show Time	Stop Me If You've Heard This One	**The Ted Steele Show** (9:00) / Local programming (9:15)	Gillette Cavalcade of Sports (9:30) / **Greatest Fights of the Century** (10:45)		
NBC	Summer	Local programming	Musical Merry-Go-Round (7:30) / Camel Newsreel Theatre (7:50)	**Hopalong Cassidy**		**The Ted Steele Show** (9:00) / Local programming (9:15)	Gillette Cavalcade of Sports (9:30) / **Greatest Fights of the Century** (10:45)		

Notes: From April 14, 1948, to April 22, 1949, Russ Hodges' Scoreboard aired Fridays from 6:30pm to 6:45pm ET on DuMont. Beginning July 18, 1949, The Magic Cottage aired on DuMont Monday through Friday from 6:30 to 7:00 p.m. Eastern Time.

On NBC, Your Show Time replaced Musical Miniatures on January 21, 1949. Your Show Time had premiered on NBC's East Coast stations in September 1948, and began to include NBC's Midwest stations on January 21.

== Saturday ==
Network		7:00 p.m.	7:30 p.m.	8:00 p.m.	8:30 p.m.	9:00 p.m.	9:30 p.m.	10:00 p.m.	10:30 p.m.
ABC		News and Views (7:00) / Local programming (7:15)	Sports with Joe Hasel (7:30) / Local programming (7:45)	Local programming					
CBS	Fall	Local programming							
CBS	Spring	Local programming	Local programming (7:30) / **Blues by Bargy** (7:45-8:00)	Local programming					
CBS	Summer	Local programming	Local programming (7:30) / **Blues by Bargy** (7:45–7:55)	Local programming					
NBC	Fall	Local programming			Television Screen Magazine	Local programming			
NBC	Late fall	Local programming		**Saturday Night Jamboree**		Local programming			
NBC	Winter	Local programming		**Saturday Night Jamboree**	Television Screen Magazine	Local programming			
NBC	Spring	Local programming			Television Screen Magazine	Local programming	**Saturday Night Jamboree**	Local programming	
NBC	Summer	Local programming		**Meet Your Congress**	Television Screen Magazine	Local programming			

== By network ==
=== ABC ===
**Returning Series**

- Candid Microphone
- Club Seven
- Critic at Large
- Fashions on Parade (moved from DuMont)
- The Gay Nineties Revue
- Hollywood Screen Test
- Kiernan's Corner
- Movieland Quiz
- News and Views
- Sports with Joe Hasel
- Teenage Book Club
- That Reminds Me
- Quizzing the News
- Three About Town
- Wrestling from Washington, D.C.

**New Series**

- **ABC Barn Dance**
- **ABC Feature Film**
- **ABC Television Players**
- **Actors Studio**
- **America's Town Meeting**
- **Blind Date** *
- **Bowling Headliners** *
- **Break the Bank**
- **Buzzy Wuzzy**
- **Celebrity Time**
- **Crusade in Europe** *
- **Celebrity Time**
- **Fashions on Parade**
- **Fun For The Money**
- **Mama Rosa**
- **On Trial**
- **Photoplay Time**
- **Roller Derby**
- **Stained Glass Windows**
- **Stand By for Crime**
- **Tales of the Red Caboose**
- **Think Fast**
- **Tomorrow's Boxing Champions**

=== CBS ===
**Returning Series**

- Face the Music
- The Fred Waring Show
- CBS Television News
- To the Queen's Taste
- Toast of the Town
- We the People
- What's It Worth
- Winner Take All

**New Series**

- **Adventures in Jazz** *
- **American Speaks**
- **Arthur Godfrey and His Friends** *
- **Arthur Godfrey's Talent Scouts** *
- **Blues by Bargy** *
- **Capital Billy's Mississippi Music Hall**
- **Ford Television Theatre Hour**
- **Kobbs' Korner**
- **Lamp Unto My Feet**
- **The Morey Amsterdam Show**
- **Our Miss Brooks**
- **The Dennis James Carnival**
- **People's Platform**
- **Places Please**
- **The Roar of the Rails**
- **Ruthie on the Telephone** *
- **The Sonny Kendis Show** *
- **Studio One**
- **Suspense** *
- **Tournament of Champions**
- **The Week in Review**
- **Wesley**

=== DuMont ===
**Returning series**

- Camera Headlines
- Charade Quiz
- Court of Current Issues
- Doorway to Fame
- I.N.S. Telenews
- The Jack Eigen Show
- Key to the Missing
- King Cole's Birthday Party
- The Original Amateur Hour

**New series**

- **Admiral Broadway Revue** *
- **The Adventures of Oky Doky**
- **The Alan Dale Show**
- **And Everything Nice** *
- **Boxing From Jamaica Arena**
- **Café de Paris** *
- **Champagne and Orchids**
- **Fashions on Parade**
- **Front Row Center** *
- **The Growing Paynes**
- **Hotel Broadway** *
- **Johnny Olson's Rumpus Room** *
- **The Laytons**
- **The Magic Cottage** *
- **Manhattan Spotlight** *
- **Newsweek Views the News**
- **The Original Amateur Hour**
- **The School House** *
- **Spin the Picture** * (originally Cut)
- **The Stan Shaw Show**
- **Teen Time Tunes** *
- **The Vincent Lopez Show**
- **Window on the World** *
- **Wrestling From Columbia Park Arena**

Not returning from 1947–48:

- Camera Headlines
- Highway to the Stars
- Look Upon a Star
- Playroom
- Small Fry Club
- The Walter Compton News
- Western movie

=== NBC ===
**Returning Series**

- America Song
- Americana
- Author Meets the Critics
- The Bigelow Show
- Camel Newsreel Theatre
- Duffy's Tavern
- Gillette Cavalcade of Sports
- Juvenile Jury
- Kraft Television Theatre
- Mary Kay and Johnny
- Meet the Press
- Musical Miniatures
- The Nature of Things
- Stop Me If You've Heard This One
- Story of the Week
- The Swift Show
- Television Playhouse
- The Texaco Star Theater
- Village Barn
- You Are an Artist

**New Series**

- **Academy Theatre** *
- **Admiral Broadway Revue** *
- **Admiral Presents Five Star Revue — Welcome Aboard**
- **The Black Robe**
- **The Chevrolet Tele-Theatre**
- **Colgate Theatre** *
- **Fireside Theatre** *
- **Garroway at Large** *
- **Girl About Town**
- **Greatest Fight of the Century**
- **The Gulf Road Show Starring Bob Smith**
- **The Hartmans** *
- **Hopalong Cassidy** *
- **Mary Margaret McBride**
- **NBC Presents** *
- **The Philco Television Playhouse**
- **Picture This**
- **Princess Sagaphi**
- **Saturday Night Jamboree**
- **The Ted Steele Show**
- **Theatre of the Mind** *
- **Welcome Aboard** *
- **Who Said That?**
- **Wrestling From St. Nicholas Arena**
- **Your Show Time** *

Not returning from 1947–48:

- The Esso Newsreel
- In the Kelvinator Kitchen
- MLB
- MLB on NBC
- Television Playhouse
- Village Barn
- The World in Your Home

Note: The * indicates that the program was introduced in midseason.

== Bibliography ==
- Bergmann, Ted; Skutch, Ira (2002). The DuMont Television Network: What Happened?. Lanham, Maryland: Scarecrow Press. ISBN 0-8108-4270-X.
- Castleman, H. & Podrazik, W. (1982). Watching TV: Four Decades of American Television. New York: McGraw-Hill. 314 pp.
