= 1948 in television =

The year 1948 in television involved some significant events. Below is a list of television-related events during 1948.

== Events ==
- (undated) - The Ziv Company creates Ziv Television Programs as a subsidiary specializing in the production of original television programs for syndication.
- February 9 - WLWT, Cincinnati, Ohio, begins commercial broadcasting, changing its call letters from experimental station W8XCT.
- March 4 - First American television ratings are released by C. E. Hooper.
- March 20 – Renowned Italian conductor Arturo Toscanini makes his television debut, conducting the NBC Symphony Orchestra in the U.S. in a program featuring the works of Richard Wagner.
- April 3 – Beethoven's Symphony No. 9 is played on television in its entirety for the first time in a concert featuring Toscanini conducting the NBC Symphony Orchestra. The chorus is conducted by Robert Shaw.
- May 3 – The first network nightly newscast, CBS Television News, debuts on CBS with Douglas Edwards as journalist.
- June 21 - The first network telecasts of political conventions from Philadelphia.
- July 29 – The BBC Television Service begins its coverage of the 1948 Olympic Games in London by broadcasting the opening ceremony. From now until the closing ceremony on August 14 the BBC will broadcast an average three and a half hours a day of live coverage from the games, using a special coaxial cable linking the main venue at Wembley Stadium to the television service's base at Alexandra Palace. This is the most ambitious sustained outside broadcast yet attempted by the BBC and is completed without serious problems.
- August 10 - ABC establishes its first television station in New York.
- August 25 – First-ever congressional hearing is televised: "Confrontation Day" between Alger Hiss and Whittaker Chambers before the House Un-American Activities Committee (HUAC)
- November 4 - Moscow TV facility adopted a new 625 line PAL television standard.
- November 25 - The earliest known national telecast of the Macy's Thanksgiving Day Parade is broadcast by CBS.
- November 29
  - Roller Derby is broadcast from NY on the CBS television network.
  - The television puppet show series Kukla, Fran and Ollie is transferred to the NBC Midwest Network.
- December 18 — WDSU TV channel 6, NBC affiliate, becomes the first station in the Deep South in New Orleans, Louisiana
- CBS begins network programming.
- Television manufacturing begins in Canada.
- Telecasts of the NBC Symphony Orchestra, begin until 1954.
- The number of homes in the U.S. that own a television set reaches one million.

== Debuts ==
- January 5 – Television Newsreel (UK) is first shown on the BBC Television Service (1948–1954).
- April 15 - For Your Pleasure debuts on NBC.
- April 18 - The ABC television network begins operation.
- April 22 - WTVR-TV, Richmond, Virginia, begins broadcasting on Channel 6. WTVR is the first TV station south of Washington, D.C., giving it the nickname "The South's first Television Station."
- April 27 - KSTP-TV, Saint Paul, Minnesota, signs on the air as an NBC affiliate, the first TV station in Minnesota.
- June 8 – Milton Berle becomes the first United States television star with the debut of Texaco Star Theater (later The Milton Berle Show) broadcast by NBC (1948–1953).
- June 9 - WBZ-TV, Boston, Massachusetts, begins broadcasting on Channel 4. WBZ is New England's first television station.
- June 20 – Toast of the Town, a variety series hosted by Ed Sullivan, premieres on CBS, with guests Dean Martin and Jerry Lewis (later renamed, The Ed Sullivan Show) (1948–1971).
- July 1 – Mark Goodson's first game series Winner Take All premieres on CBS (1948–1952).
- August 10 – Candid Microphone (renamed Candid Camera in 1949) debuts on ABC (1948 – present).
- September 8 - Girl About Town debuts on NBC.
- September 29 - WSB-TV, Atlanta, Georgia, begins broadcasting on Channel 8.
- October 12 - Vanity Fair debuts (1948-1951).
- November 15 - The Adventures of Oky Doky premieres (1948–1949).
- November 24 - The Arrow Show premieres (1948-1949).
- November - Super Circus premieres (1948-49 locally on WENR, 1949-1956 nationwide)
- Amanda (1948–1949).
- The Bigelow Show premieres (1948–1949).
- Champagne and Orchids (1948–1949).
- Child's World debuts (1948–1949).
- Actors Studio (1948–1950).
- Cartoon Teletales (1948–1950).
- The Alan Dale Show premieres (1948–1951).
- Club Seven (1948–1951).

== Television programs ==
Series	Debut	Ended	Network
The Original Amateur Hour	January 18, 1948	September 27, 1970	CBS
Court of Current Issues	February 9, 1948	June 26, 1951	Dumont
Stop Me If You've Heard This One	March 4, 1948	April 22, 1949	NBC
Author Meets the Critics	April 1948	October 10, 1954	NBC
Hollywood Screen Test	April 15, 1948	1953	ABC
Texaco Star Theater	June 8, 1948	1953	NBC
The Ed Sullivan Show	June 20, 1948	June 6, 1971	CBS
Candid Camera	August 10, 1948	2014	ABC
CBS Evening News	August 15, 1948	—	CBS
Foodini the Great	August 23, 1948	June 23, 1951	CBS
Actors Studio	September 1948	June 1950	ABC
Champagne and Orchids	September 6, 1948	January 10, 1949	Dumont
Ford Theatre	October 17, 1948	July 10, 1957	NBC
The Growing Paynes	October 20, 1948	August 3, 1949	Dumont
The Adventures of Oky Doky	November 4, 1948	May 26, 1949	Dumont
The Morey Amsterdam Show	December 17, 1948	October 12, 1950	CBS
The Alan Dale Show	1948	1951	Dumont
Amanda	1948	1949	Dumont
Arthur Godfrey's Talent Scouts	1948	January 1, 1958	CBS
The Bigelow Show	1948	1949	
Break the Bank	1948	1957	ABC
Cartoon Teletales	1948	1950	ABC
Celebrity Time	1948	September 1952	CBS
Child's World	1948	1949	
Club Seven	1948	1951	ABC
The Philco Television Playhouse	1948	1955	NBC
Winner Take All	1948	1952	CBS

== Programs ending during 1948 ==
Date	Show	Debut
June 30	In the Kelvinator Kitchen	1947
Unknown	Eye Witness	1947
Unknown	The World in Your Home	1944

== Births ==
- January 2 - Judith Miller, American journalist
- January 5 - Ted Lange, actor, director (The Love Boat)
- January 12 - Martha Teichner, American television news correspondent
- January 14 - Carl Weathers, actor (Tour of Duty, Arrested Development) (died 2024)
- January 16 - John Carpenter, actor
- January 18 - M. C. Gainey, actor (Against the Law, Lost)
- January 22 - Velton Ray Bunch, composer
- January 29
  - Cristina Saralegui, Cuban-American talk show host and actress
  - Marc Singer, Canadian actor
- February 4 - Alice Cooper, actor and singer
- February 5
  - Christopher Guest, actor
  - Barbara Hershey, actress
  - Tom Wilkinson, actor (died 2023)
- February 14 - Pat O'Brien, American author and radio host
- February 15 - Tino Insana, actor (died 2017)
- February 18 - Peter Lance, American journalist
- February 20 - Jennifer O'Neill, actress
- February 22
  - John Ashton, actor
  - Joe Cortese, actor
- February 24 - Dennis Waterman, actor (died 2022)
- February 28
  - Bernadette Peters, actress and singer
  - Mercedes Ruehl, actress
- February 29
  - Ken Foree, actor
  - Gérard Darmon, actor
  - Kerry Walker, actress
- March 3 - Brian Cummings, actor
- March 6 - Anna Maria Horsford, actress (Amen, The Wayans Bros.)
- March 13 - Robert S. Woods, actor (One Life to Live)
- March 14 - Billy Crystal, actor, comedian (Soap, Saturday Night Live)
- March 20 - John de Lancie, actor (Star Trek: The Next Generation)
- March 22 - Wolf Blitzer, American journalist
- March 24 - Adrian Shergold, director
- March 25 - Bonnie Bedelia, actress (Love of Life)
- March 26 - Steven Tyler, actor
- March 28 - Dianne Wiest, actress (Law & Order)
- March 30 - Justin Deas, actor (As the World Turns, Santa Barbara, Guiding Light)
- March 31
  - Al Gore, American politician
  - Rhea Perlman, actress (Cheers)
- April 6 - Patrika Darbo, actress (Step by Step)
- April 7 - Michael Hirsh, Canadian producer
- April 12
  - Jeremy Beadle, English presenter (died 2008)
  - Rita Braver, American television news correspondent
- April 13 - Bob Kur, American television journalist
- April 19 - Andrew Scheinman, American film and television producer
- April 20 - Gregory Itzin, actor (24) (died 2022)
- April 25 - Freda Foh Shen, actress (Elementary, Silk Stalkings, Gideon's Crossing)
- April 27
  - Kate Pierson, singer
  - Si Robertson, American television personality
- April 30
  - Perry King, actor (Riptide)
  - Allan Arkush, producer
- May 3
  - Chris Mulkey, actor
  - Peter Oosterhuis, golfer
- May 6 - Paul Linke, actor (CHiPs)
- May 8
  - Stephen Stohn, American-Canadian lawyer and producer
  - Gale Tattersall, producer
- May 10 - Meg Foster, actress
- May 11
  - Joe Bodolai, writer (died 2011)
  - Pam Ferris, actress
- May 12 - Lindsay Crouse, actress
- May 14
  - Walter Olkewicz, actor (died 2021)
  - Rich Correll, actor
- May 17 - Jim Gardner, broadcaster
- May 19 - Grace Jones, actress
- May 21
  - Carol Potter, actress (Beverly Hills, 90210)
  - Jonathan Hyde, actor
- May 23 - Gary McCord, golfer
- May 26 - Stevie Nicks, singer
- May 27 - Ken Lerner, actor
- June 1 - Powers Boothe, actor (Philip Marlowe, Private Eye, Deadwood, 24, Nashville, Agents of S.H.I.E.L.D., Justice League, Justice League Unlimited), (died 2017)
- June 2 - Jerry Mathers, actor (Leave It to Beaver)
- June 11 - Stephen Schnetzer, actor (Another World)
- June 19 - Phylicia Rashad, actress (The Cosby Show)
- June 20 - Tina Sinatra, businesswoman
- June 25 - Jesse Frederick, singer
- June 28 - Kathy Bates, actress
- June 29 - Fred Grandy, actor (The Love Boat)
- July 2 - Saul Rubinek, actor
- July 12
  - Jay Thomas, actor (died 2017)
  - Richard Simmons, American fitness personality (died 2024)
- July 13 - Daphne Maxwell Reid, actress (The Fresh Prince of Bel-Air)
- July 15 - Anne Sinclair, French television and radio interviewer
- July 16 - Rubén Blades, actor
- July 19 - Beverly Archer, actress (Mama's Family, Major Dad)
- July 22 - Neil Hardwick, British-born Finnish theatre and TV director
- July 25 - Eren Ozker, American puppeteer (died 1993)
- July 28 - Georgia Engel, actress (The Mary Tyler Moore Show) (died 2019)
- July 30 - Jean Reno, actor
- August 2 - Dennis Prager, talk show host
- August 5 - Carole Laure, actress
- August 8 - Wincey Willis, British broadcaster (Good Morning Britain, Treasure Hunt) (died 2024)
- August 13 - Merrill Markoe, writer
- August 14 - Joseph Marcell, English actor (The Fresh Prince of Bel-Air)
- August 18
  - Maureen Garrett, actress (Guiding Light, Ryan's Hope)
  - Sean Scanlan, actor
  - Grainger Hines, actor
- August 19 - Deana Martin, actress
- August 20 - John Noble, Australian actor (Fringe, Sleepy Hollow)
- August 23 - Steve Edwards, American talk show host
- August 24 - John Beard, American news anchor
- August 27 - Sgt. Slaughter, actor and pro wrestler
- August 30 - Lewis Black, American actor
- September 7
  - Susan Blakely, actress (Rich Man, Poor Man)
  - Roz Abrams, American television news journalist
- September 13
  - Nell Carter, actress, singer (Gimme a Break!) (died 2003)
  - Clyde Kusatsu, actor
- September 16 - Susan Ruttan, actress (L.A. Law)
- September 17 - John Ritter, actor, comedian (Three's Company) (died 2003)
- September 19 - Jeremy Irons, actor
- September 20
  - Joanna Cameron, actress (died 2021)
  - George R. R. Martin, author
- September 24
  - Phil Hartman, Canadian actor, comedian (Saturday Night Live) (died 1998)
  - Gordon Clapp, actor (NYPD Blue)
- September 25 - Mimi Kennedy, actress (Homefront)
- September 26 - Bruce Sudano, songwriter
- September 27
  - Michele Dotrice, English actress
  - Tom Braidwood, actor
  - A Martinez, soap opera actor and singer
- September 29 - Bryant Gumbel, journalist and sportscaster
- October 2 - Avery Brooks, actor (Spenser: For Hire, A Man Called Hawk, Star Trek: Deep Space Nine)
- October 4 - Linda McMahon, politician and businesswoman (WWE)
- October 5 - Sal Viscuso, actor (M*A*S*H)
- October 6 - Frances Tomelty, actress
- October 10 - Carol Marin, journalist
- October 12 - Eli Danker, actor
- October 17 - George Wendt, actor (Cheers) (died 2025)
- October 19
  - Pat Klous, actress (The Love Boat, Flying High)
  - Dave Mallow, actor
- October 21
  - Dick Christie, actor (Small Wonder)
  - Tom Everett, actor
- October 23 - Brian Ross, journalist
- October 24 - James Whitmore, Jr., actor
- October 28 - Telma Hopkins, singer, actress (Family Matters)
- October 29 - Kate Jackson, actress (Charlie's Angels, Scarecrow and Mrs. King)
- November 1 - Anna Stuart, actress
- November 7 - James Houghton, actor (Knots Landing)
- November 10 - Aaron Brown, journalist
- November 11 - Vincent Schiavelli, actor (died 2005)
- November 14 - Robert Ginty, actor (died 2009)
- November 15 - Bob Beckel, commentator (died 2022)
- November 17 - Howard Fineman, commentator (died 2024)
- November 20
  - Richard Masur, actor
  - Harlee McBride, actress
- November 21 - Lonnie Jordan, singer
- November 25 - Storm Field, American television meteorologist
- November 30 - Larry Bishop, actor
- December 3 - Ozzy Osbourne, English singer, songwriter and actor (The Osbournes) (died 2025)
- December 6 - JoBeth Williams, actress
- December 7 - Tony Thomas, producer
- December 21
  - Samuel L. Jackson, actor (Pulp Fiction)
  - Barry Gordon, actor
- December 22
  - Noel Edmonds, English television presenter
  - Steve Garvey, Football player who played himself on an episode of the NBC sitcom Just Shoot Me! in 1999
- December 25 - Barbara Mandrell, singer
- December 26 - Candy Crowley, American news anchor
- December 31 - Donna Summer, singer-songwriter (died 2012)

== Television debuts ==
- Mischa Auer – The Chevrolet Tele-Theatre
- Ralph Bellamy – The Philco Television Playhouse
- Bruce Cabot – Stars Over Hollywood
- John Carradine – The Chevrolet Tele-Theatre
- Jackie Cooper – Kraft Television Theatre
- James Dunn – The Chevrolet Tele-Theatre
- Dean Jagger – Studio One
- Paul Muni – The Philco Television Playhouse
