= Ray Morgan (announcer) =

American Radio and Television announcer

Raymond Storrs Morgan (May 5, 1914 – January 5, 1975) was an American radio and television announcer.

== Early life ==
Morgan was born on May 5, 1914, in Trenton, New Jersey, to Dr. and Mrs. Walter Morgan. He grew up in Oak Park, Illinois, and graduated from Dartmouth College in 1935. On June 26, 1937, he married Ruie Rideout in Englewood, New Jersey. Morgan’s father officiated the services. Prior to going into radio, Morgan worked for McGraw Hill.

== Career ==
=== Radio ===
Morgan began his radio career in 1939 at WPG in Atlantic City, New Jersey. He then worked at WCOP in Boston and WBAB in Atlantic City before moving to WINX in Washington, D.C., in 1941. During World War II he worked for the United States Office of War Information. After the war he joined WWDC, where he hosted Open House a daily program that aired from 10-11 a.m. He left the show in 1947 to become the secondary announcer for the Washington Senators alongside Arch McDonald. Morgan continued to cover sports for WWDC until 1958.

Nationally, Morgan appeared on Gang Busters, Counterspy, When a Girl Marries, and We the People.

=== Television ===
From 1948 to 1949, Morgan was the announcer for The Roar of the Rails, a CBS television program designed to sell American Flyer toy trains. From 1948 to 1949 he also hosted I'd Like to See, an NBC program where viewers would write in to suggest places or things for the show to feature. The format was later adapted by the DuMont Network’s You Asked for It. From 1951 to 1952 he hosted, American Inventory, an NBC educational program produced in conjunction with the Alfred P. Sloan Foundation that featured panel discussions in an attempt to create a "living newspaper".

Morgan also announced for Toast of the Town, Studio One, Kraft Music Hall, Robert Montgomery Presents, The Ted Mack Amateur Hour and acted on The Magic Clown.

=== Wrestling ===
In 1958, Morgan became sports director of WTTG in Washington, D.C. Soon thereafter he became the announcer for Capitol Wrestling Corporation's (forerunner to the WWE) Heavyweight Wrestling From Washington. In 1966, Morgan left WTTG when the wrestling program moved from WTTG to WDCA. In 1971, CWC promoter Vincent J. McMahon moved his television broadcasts from D.C. to Hamburg, Pennsylvania. The following year, Morgan requested a pay raise to compensate for having to travel to Pennsylvania. McMahon instead chose to replace Morgan with his son, Vince K. McMahon.

== Death ==
On January 5, 1975, Morgan died of cancer at Englewood Hospital in Englewood, New Jersey. At the time of his death, Morgan was residing in Tenafly, New Jersey. He was survived by his wife and daughter.
