= Saturday Night Jamboree =

American country music TV program

Saturday Night Jamboree, also referred to as the NBC Jamboree, is an early American country music series on NBC-TV from December 4, 1948–July 2, 1949. The name was originally given to an NBC Saturday night radio show in the 1930s, which was broadcast on the WEAF station in New York City.

The TV series aired live from New York City from 8–9 p.m. Eastern Time on Saturdays for three weeks in December 1948, with yodeler Elton Britt as host. Beginning in January 1949, the host was Boyd Heath and the program aired from 8–8:30 p.m. until April, when it moved to 9:30–10 p.m. through July 2. The cast included comedian "Chubby Chuck" Roe; Sophrony Garen, vocals; Ted Grunt, fiddle; Eddie Howard, banjo; John Havens, guitar; "Smilin'" Edwin Smith, accordion and Gabe Drake, bass fiddle.

The show's competition included Stand By for Crime on ABC, Spin the Picture on DuMont, and sports on CBS.

== Other Saturday Night Jamboree programs ==
Other programs named Saturday Night Jamboree included the following:

- A program that ran for more than 10 years on WSAZ-TV in Huntington, West Virginia.
- A program that debuted on WFMY-TV in Greensboro, North Carolina, on April 4, 1953.
- A radio program on WOPI in the Bristol, Tennessee-Bristol, Virginia market in the 1940s.
- A radio program on WMAQ in Chicago in the mid-1930s.
