= Doky =

Doky is a surname. Notable people with the surname include:

- Chris Minh Doky (born 1969), Vietnamese-Danish jazz bassist
- Niels Lan Doky (born 1963), Danish jazz pianist, composer, and producer

== See also ==
- The Adventures of Oky Doky
