= Kyle MacDonnell =

American actress

Ruth Kyle MacDonnell (May 13, 1922 - September 28, 2004) was an American model, singer, and actress. She was featured as a "Television Ingenue" on the front page of Life magazine's May 31, 1948, issue.

== Early years ==
MacDonnell was born in Austin, Texas, the daughter of Mr. and Mrs. George B. MacDonnell of Larned, Kansas. She graduated from Larned High School and Kansas State College and did post-graduate study at Ward-Belmont College, where she was a member of the Glee Club.

== Career ==
In September 1945, MacDonnell was named Miss Nashville Air Transport Command, making her the group's "official sweetheart and pin-up girl". A contemporary newspaper account of the event reported that thousands of people were turned away from the "jam-packed" War Memorial Auditorium in which MacDonnell was selected over 26 other contestants. The win gained national attention for MacDonnell and worldwide distribution of her photograph to ATC stations.

Winning led to MacDonnell's becoming a professional model for Harry Conover's agency. Conover had crowned her in the Miss ATC contest, and when he met her again at that fall's Army-Notre Dame football game, he offered her a job, which she accepted. She was featured in a full-page cover photograph on the May 5, 1946, issue of Parade magazine, a nationally distributed Sunday newspaper supplement. A paragraph inside the magazine referred to her as "already one of the top-ranking photographer's models."

Warner Bros. signed MacDonnell to a film contract in 1947. She appeared in the film Taxi (1953). She also performed in night clubs, including the Hotel Plaza's Persian Room in New York City and the Carousel in Pittsburgh.

MacDonnell was named Miss Television 1948, the year in which an article in Life described her on-air persona as being "a cross between professional stage presence and conversational intimacy, between American girlishness and blond sexiness." She had her own 15-minute weekly variety program, For Your Pleasure, on NBC in 1948. In September of that year, MacDonnell and the Norman Paris Trio were shifted from For Your Pleasure to the new half-hour Girl About Town, which ended in June 1949. She also was a host of Hold That Camera and a panelist on Celebrity Time.

MacDonnell's Broadway credits include Park Avenue, Make Mine Manhattan (1948) and Touch and Go (1949). Also on stage, she performed in Twin Beds' national touring company in 1953.

In January 1952, MacDonnell began her first radio show. WOR in New York carried The Kyle MacDonnell Show, a 15-minute disc jockey program, on Monday, Wednesday, and Friday evenings.

She retired from show business in 1959 after her marriage.

== Personal life ==
MacDonnell had four marriages. In 1942, she married Norris J. McGaw in Larned, Kansas. After their divorce, she married Charles K. Laitus in 1948, but they divorced soon afterward. On July 19, 1950, she married Richard H. Gordon, a theater writer and producer. They divorced in October 1954. In 1959, she married William H. Vernon, a banker who died in 1995.

== Death ==
On September 28, 2004, MacDonnell died at her home in Santa Fe, New Mexico, at age 82.

== Papers ==
MacDonnell's papers are housed at the Kansas Historical Society.
