= Key to the Missing =

- Starring: Archdale Jones
- Country of origin: United States

Production
- Running time: 30 minutes

Original release
- Network: DuMont
- Release: July 4, 1948 – September 23, 1949

Key to the Missing is a documentary TV series that aired on the DuMont Television Network from July 4, 1948, to September 23, 1949. Each 30-minute episode was hosted by Archdale Jones.

Based on the radio program Where Are They Now, Key to the Missing sought to find missing people. Techniques used included displaying pictures and samples of handwriting of missing people and interviewing their relatives and friends. Viewers who had insights into where any of the missing people might be were asked to call with relevant information.

The program's schedule had it on Friday nights for most of its time on the air, but it was on Sunday nights August - October 1948 and Thursday nights March - April 1949. Its competition included Places Please on CBS.

== Production ==
Jones was the producer and director, with James Caddigan as technical director. The program originated from WABD in New York City and was sustaining.

== Reception ==
A review of the June 27, 1948, episode in the trade publication Billboard noted a "phony and completely unnecessary build-up" to one segment of the program, and it summarized, "Production was poor, pace non-existent."

== Episode status ==
As with most DuMont series, no episodes are known to survive.

== See also ==
- List of programs broadcast by the DuMont Television Network
- List of surviving DuMont Television Network broadcasts
- 1948-49 United States network television schedule

== Bibliography ==
- David Weinstein, The Forgotten Network: DuMont and the Birth of American Television (Philadelphia: Temple University Press, 2004) ISBN 1-59213-245-6
- Alex McNeil, Total Television, Fourth edition (New York: Penguin Books, 1980) ISBN 0-14-024916-8
- Tim Brooks and Earle Marsh, The Complete Directory to Prime Time Network and Cable TV Shows 1946–Present, Ninth edition (New York: Ballantine Books, 2007) ISBN 978-0-345-49773-4
