= Amanda Randolph =

American actress and singer (1896–1967)

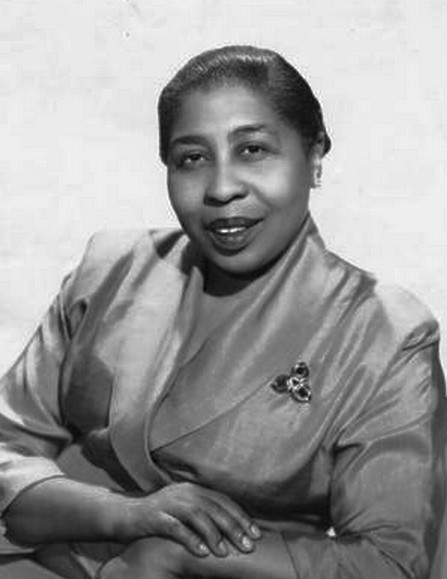
- Randolph in 1953
- Born: Amanda E. Randolph; September 2, 1896; Louisville, Kentucky, U.S.
- Died: August 24, 1967 (aged 70); Duarte, California, U.S.
- Resting place: Forest Lawn Memorial Park, Hollywood Hills
- Other name: Mandy Randolph
- Occupations: Actress, singer, pianist
- Years active: 1919–1967
- Spouse(s): Arthur Sherman (m.1918–?); Harry Hansberry (m.?–1961)
- Children: 2
- Relatives: Lillian Randolph (sister); Barbara Randolph (niece)

Amanda E. Randolph (September 2, 1896 – August 24, 1967) was an American actress and singer. She was the first African-American performer to star in a regularly scheduled network television show, appearing in DuMont's The Laytons.

== Early life ==
Born in Louisville, Kentucky, Randolph was the daughter of a Methodist minister and a teacher. She had a younger sister, Lillian who also became an actress. (Note: Steve Gibson, with his Rhythm and Blues group, The Five Red Caps, was said to be a brother. However, this cannot be substantiated.)

== Career ==
=== Music ===
The Randolph family moved frequently. At the age of 14, Randolph began earning extra money playing the piano and organ in Cleveland, Ohio. Around 1919, she moved to Cincinnati, Ohio, where she recorded several piano rolls of hot jazz and blues music for the Vocalstyle company of Cincinnati while working as a musician in Ohio's Lyric Theatre. These are the only known rolls recorded by a black female pianist. Randolph did her work for the company under the name Mandy Randolph. She is shown as the performer of "The Yellow Dog Blues", by W. C. Handy in 1919, Vocalstyle roll # 11562. Randolph also wrote music she recorded for the Vocalstyle company; she is shown as both the performer and composer of "I'm Gonna Jazz My Way Right Straight Thru Paradise", and as the co-author of "Cryin' Blues" with H. C. Washington.

Randolph also cut audio recordings, accompanied by Sammie Lewis. A record album was produced in 1996 by Document Records called, Blues & Jazz Obscurities (1923–1931), containing the six duets the pair produced. Still working under the name Mandy Randolph, she recorded "Cootie Crawl" (G11425) on April 30, 1923, and "I Got Another Lovin' Daddy" for Gennett Records.

She was invited to join the Sissle and Blake musical, Shuffle Along, in New York in 1924 and went on to do Lucky Sambo as one of the Three Dixie Songbirds (sharing the bill with its star, Tim Moore, whom she later appeared with on The Amos 'n' Andy Show from 1951 to 1953). in 1925, she was part of Sissle and Blake's The Chocolate Dandies. Randolph then worked in musicals at New York's Alhambra Theater until 1930, following that with work in Europe and England for a year.

Randolph worked on the vaudeville and burlesque circuits as a comedian and as a singer, noting that Abbott and Costello also got their start the same way. Randolph took a four-year hiatus from show business in 1932; she married and helped her husband run their restaurant in New York called The Clam House, which was a favorite of those in the entertainment industry. She then returned to performing, playing piano at a Greenwich Village club called The Black Cat. She continued recording for Bluebird Records, a label created in 1932 and owned by RCA Victor Records. She did the vocals with her own band, billed as Amanda Randolph and her Orchestra. The records were made in New York City on October 8, 1936. On that date, Amanda cut: "Please Don't Talk About My Man" (Bluebird 6615), "Doin' The Suzie-Q" (Bluebird 6615), "Honey, Please Don't Turn Your Back On Me" (Bluebird 6616), "For Sentimental Reasons" (Bluebird 6617), "He May Be Your Man But" (Bluebird 6617), and "I've Got Something In My Eye", (Bluebird 6619-B). She also recorded "After Hours"; some of these songs can be heard on radio station KBRD which also broadcasts on the internet.

=== Films, radio and television ===
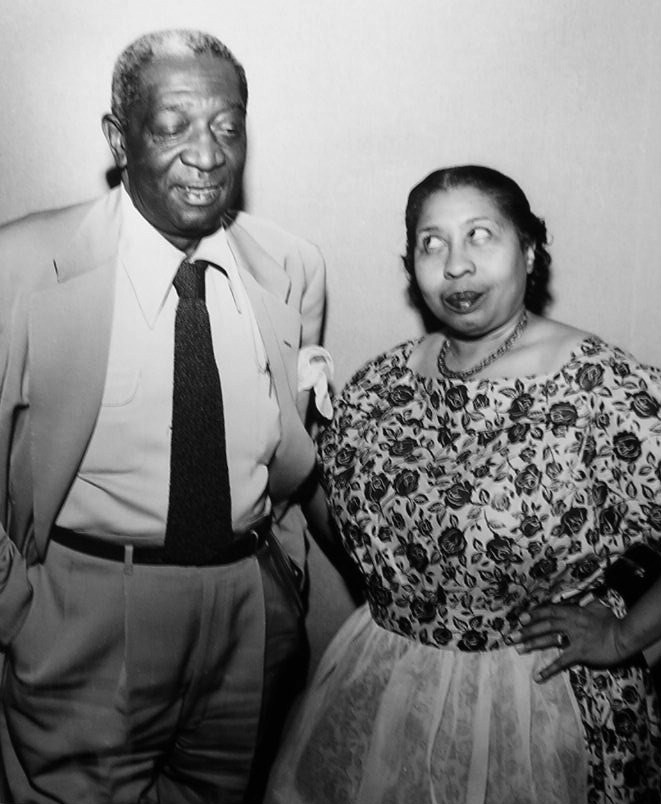
Amanda Randolph as "Beulah" with Ernest Whitman, who played her boyfriend "Bill" on the radio show

Randolph's film career began in 1936 with Black Network. She went on to do several Oscar Micheaux films, among them: Swing, Lying Lips and The Notorious Elinor Lee. Broadway roles in The Male Animal and Harlem Cavalcade soon followed. Around the same time, Randolph broke into radio, helped by people she met at The Clam House, who got her a CBS audition. She began working on various radio shows: Young Dr. Malone, Romance of Helen Trent and Big Sister.

She went on to become a regular cast member on Abie's Irish Rose, Kitty Foyle, and Miss Hattie with Ethel Barrymore, where she had the role of Venus. Randolph also appeared on Rudy Vallée's radio show and on Grand Central Station.

She continued working in films until the 1960s, and was one of the first African-American women to become a comedy favorite on television. Randolph and the trio The Three Barons appeared over CBS-TV in 1944, and she was the first African-American performer to star in a regularly scheduled network television show, appearing in DuMont's The Laytons. This short-lived program was on the air two months in 1948.

Although sometimes uncredited, Randolph was the voice of Petunia in Famous Studios' popular Little Audrey. The following is a list of cartoons in which Randolph voiced Petunia:

- Butterscotch and Soda (1948)
- The Lost Dream (1949)
- Song of the Birds (1949)
- Hold the Lion, Please (1951)
- Audrey the Rainmaker (1951)

During the 1948-49 television season, Randolph starred for about a year in her own daytime musical TV program for DuMont, Amanda, which aired Mon-Fridays from 12noon to 12:15pm ET, making her the first African-American woman with her own show on daytime television. Randolph did not settle in California until 1949, when she earned a role in Sidney Poitier's No Way Out. Even though she was working in New York and her younger sister, Lillian, had been working in Hollywood for some time, newspapers often got the two sisters mixed up, doing a story on Amanda but with a photo of Lillian and vice versa. She then became a regular on the early TV series, The Amos 'n' Andy Show, as Sapphire's mother, Ramona Smith, from 1951 to 1953; she also played the same role for the show's radio version from 1951 to 1954.

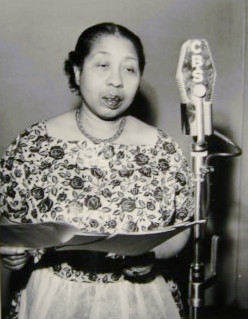
Randolph in the title role of The Beulah Show on radio

Randolph then began working with her sister, Lillian, who played Madame Queen on the radio and television shows. She was the star and titular character in The Beulah Show from 1953 to 1954, assuming the role from Lillian. Randolph also did some work for CBS Radio Workshop in 1956, playing the role of the folk heroine Annie Christmas in The Legend of Annie Christmas.

Randolph had a recurring role as Louise the Maid on CBS's The Danny Thomas Show and appeared in the show's 1967 reunion program, which aired shortly after her death. She guest-starred on the NBC anthology series, The Barbara Stanwyck Show. In 1955, Amanda opened a restaurant in Los Angeles called "Mama's Place", where she did the cooking.

Despite all her film and television work, Randolph found herself slightly short of the requirements for a much-needed Screen Actors Guild pension at the age of 70 (both sisters had struggled for roles in the late 1930s). A role was written for her to gain eligibility.

== Personal life ==
She married Harry Hansberry sometime after 1940. Hansberry was the owner of the "Hansberry's Clam House" (aka "Edith's Clam House") at 146 West 133rd Street, New York City's most famous gay speakeasy in Harlem, The couple had two children before separating, and they remained estranged until Hansberry died of a heart attack in 1961.

== Death ==
Randolph died of a stroke in Duarte, California, on August 24, 1967, aged 70. She is survived by a son, Joseph, and a daughter, Evelyn. She is interred at Forest Lawn Memorial Park in the Hollywood Hills beside her sister, Lillian.

== Filmography ==
- Comes Midnight (1940)
