= Spin the Picture =

American TV game show

- Genre: Game show
- Presented by: Kathi Norris; Carl Caruso
- Country of origin: United States
- Original language: English

Production
- Running time: 60 minutes

Original release
- Network: DuMont Television Network
- Release: 4 June 1949 – 4 February 1950

Spin the Picture is an American game show that aired on the DuMont Television Network.

== Format ==
The hosts telephoned home viewers to see if they could identify a famous person within a spinning photograph that was accompanied by a verbal clue. Successful identification brought a prize for the viewer. Unsuccessful identification resulted in a consolation prize for the viewer and an increase in the show's jackpot.

== Background and schedule ==
The show was originally called Cut at its premiere on June 4, 1949, and was renamed Spin the Picture on June 18. The show was hosted by Carl Caruso, Eddie Dunn, and Kathi Norris.

From June 1949 to January 1950 it was on Saturdays from 8 to 9 p.m. Eastern Time. In January 1959, it was cut to 30 minutes, running from 8 to 8:30 p.m. ET on Saturdays. The final show was broadcast February 4, 1950.

The show's competition included For Your Pleasure on NBC and Stand By for Crime on ABC.

== Episode status ==
No copies of this show are known to exist.

== See also ==
- List of programs broadcast by the DuMont Television Network
- List of surviving DuMont Television Network broadcasts
- 1949-50 United States network television schedule

== Bibliography ==
- David Weinstein, The Forgotten Network: DuMont and the Birth of American Television (Philadelphia: Temple University Press, 2004) ISBN 1-59213-245-6
