= Welcome Aboard =

- Also known as: Admiral Presents the Five Star Revue—Welcome Aboard
- Genre: Variety
- Opening theme: "Sailor's Hornpipe"
- Country of origin: United States
- Original language: English

Production
- Camera setup: Multi-camera
- Running time: 25 minutes

Original release
- Network: NBC
- Release: October 3, 1948 – February 20, 1949

Welcome Aboard is an American variety show that was televised live on Saturdays at 6:30pm EST on NBC. The series was initially titled Admiral Presents the Five Star Revue—Welcome Aboard, when it was sponsored by Admiral but was retitled when sponsorship was dropped in December 1948.

The premiere episode featured Martin and Lewis (after their June 20, 1948 appearance on The Ed Sullivan Show), and Phil Silvers. The second episode on October 10 also featured Martin and Lewis, and a kinescope of this latter show is preserved in the UCLA Film and Television Archive. Three additional episodes are held by the Library of Congress

== See also ==
- 1948-49 United States network television schedule
