= Admiral (electrical appliances) =

American appliance brand

Logo

Admiral is an American appliance brand that is currently marketed by Whirlpool Corporation and sold exclusively at The Home Depot.

== History ==
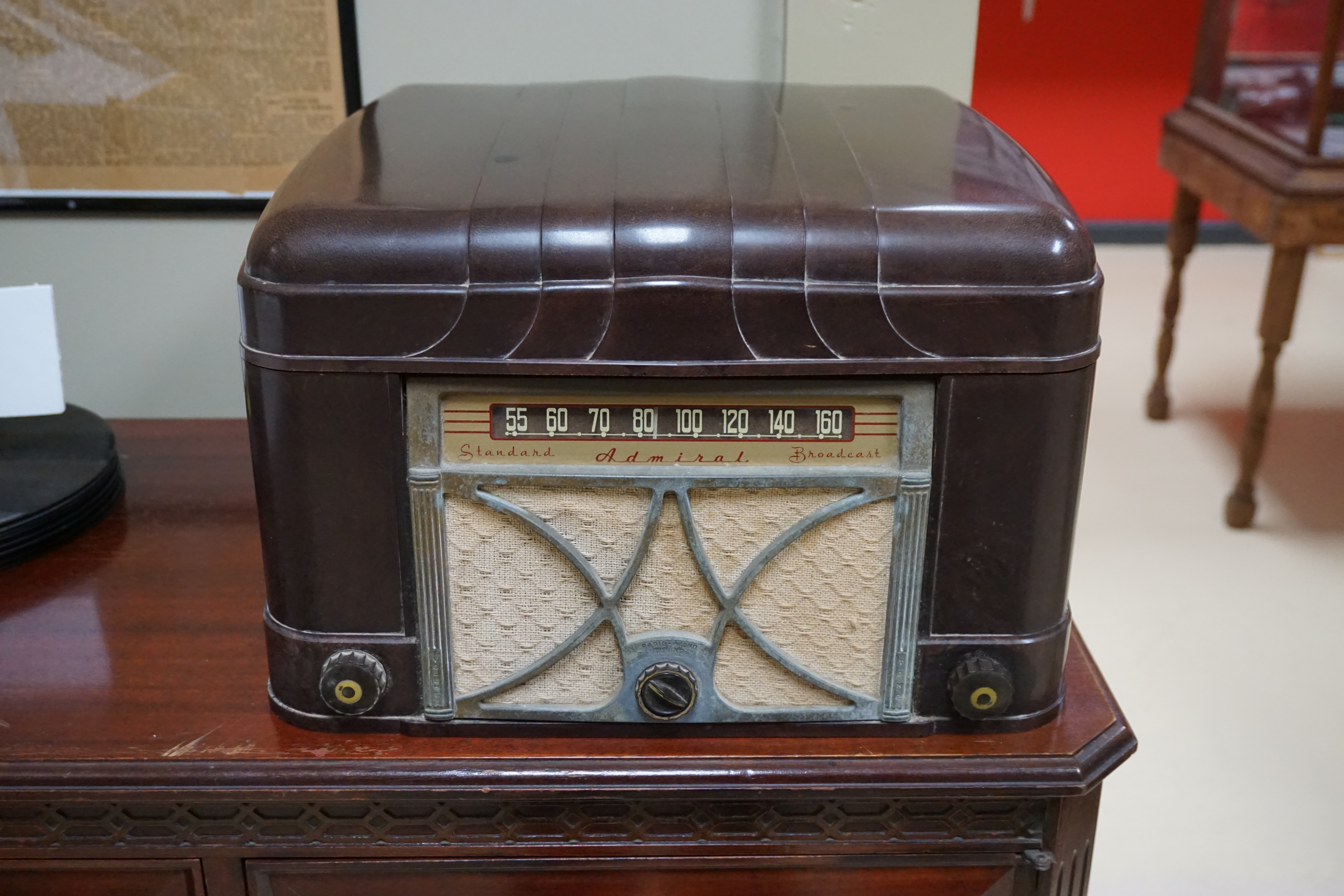
Admiral radio-phonograph, c. 1950, at the Lamar County Historical Museum

In 1934 in Chicago, Illinois, Ross Siragusa founded Continental Radio and Television Corporation (CRTC), which produced consumer electronics such as radios and phonographs. The radios were designed and produced by Radio Products Corporation (RPC), owned by Irwin J Mendels. During World War II, the US wanted to supply Lend Lease to England and the government would not buy from a sales company (CRTC). So, CRTC and RPC consolidated. They considered a wartime name like General, and instead went with another high rank name, Admiral Corporation. Throughout the war, Admiral grew and won the Army-Navy "E" Award for Excellence in production.

With annual sales totaling $2 million, Admiral's products ranged from electronic equipment used by the U.S. military in World War II to consumer televisions. In 1950, Admiral was selling: a line of seven TV sets, with four models having a 12.5 in (32 cm) tube size, at prices between $179.95 and $379.95 (equivalent to $2,408 to $5,352 today); a 16 in (41 cm) model retailing at $299.95 ($3,187); and two 19 in (48 cm) models (priced at $495 and $695, equivalent to $6,624 and $9,300). During this era, their success in television sales allowed them to diversify into other major appliances, including refrigerators.

During World War II, Admiral was the weekly sponsor of the CBS Radio Network Sunday news program, with it and World News Today utilising the promotional slogan "America's Smart Set." Admiral was also one of the first major advertisers on television, sponsoring Sid Caesar’s Admiral Broadway Revue, Lights Out, Fulton J. Sheen's Life Is Worth Living, Admiral Presents the Five Star Review - Welcome Aboard and Notre Dame football games. Annual sales hit $300 million and the company employed approximately 8,500 people by the early 1960s.

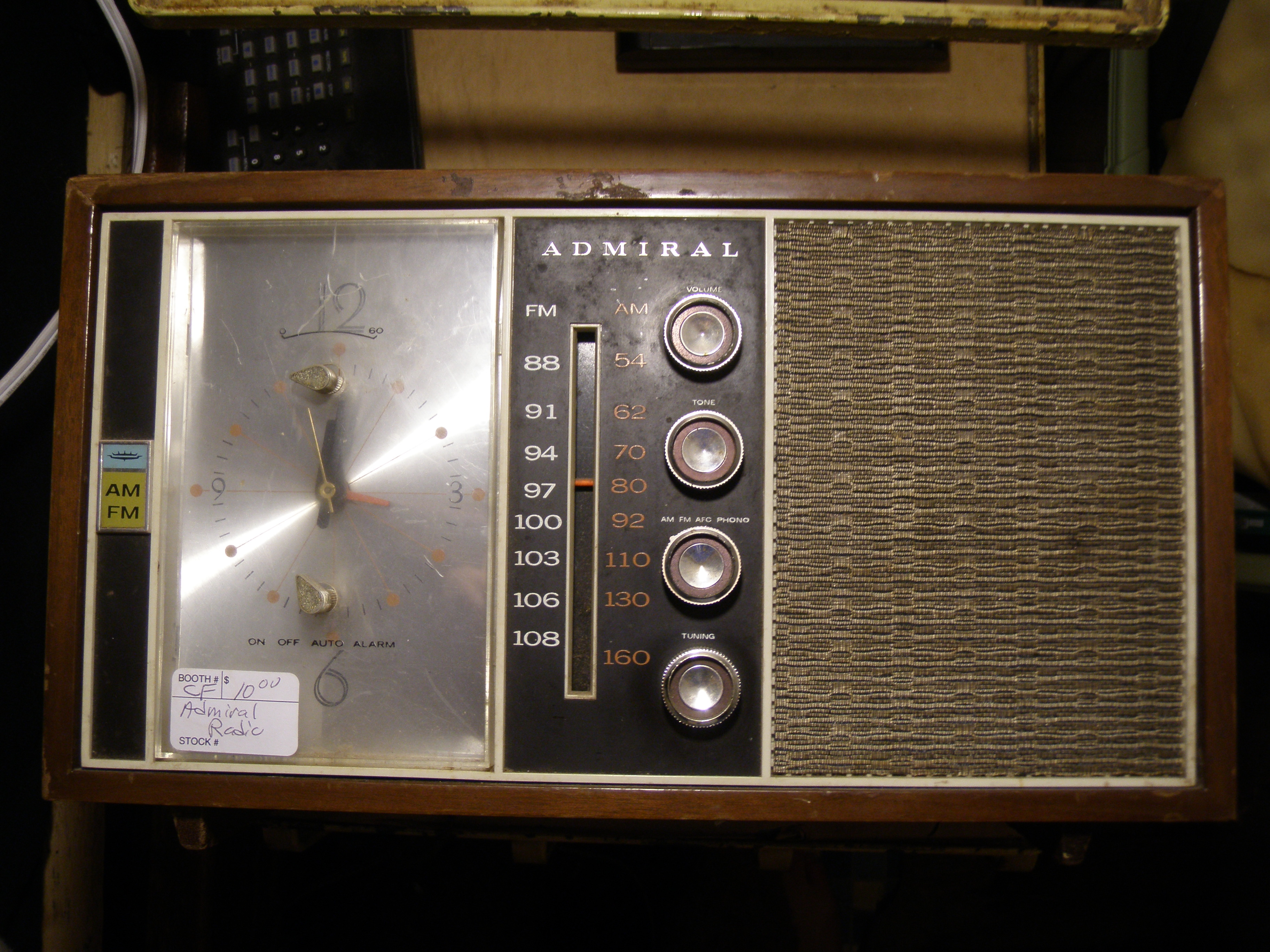
Admiral clock-radio

During the Cold War, Admiral additionally manufactured military TV cameras for reconnaissance purposes under adverse conditions, on land, in the air and underwater.

In 1962, Admiral Corporation listed four manufacturing plants in Illinois, identified as subsidiaries of Admiral International Corp. of which Norman E. Johnson was named president; the corporation collectively employed approximately 5,730 Illinois employees in 1962. The Chicago headquarters was located at 3800 West Cortland Street, with Ross D. Siragusa identified as chairman and president, Cy S. Rossate as vice president in charge of production and William L. Dunn as vice president of engineering. The factory started a workforce of 2,100 employees and produced television sets & combinations, radios, record changers, refrigerators, ranges, freezers, air conditioners, dehumidifiers, and stereophonic phonographs. A second Chicago facility was located at 4150 North Knox Avenue with a workforce of 230 employees that manufactured record changers, power supplies, and metal stampings. In Galesburg, Illinois, the Midwest Manufacturing Corporation was listed as a subsidiary of Admiral Corp. with George Heidenblut as vice president of engineering and a labor force of 1,400 employees that made refrigerators, freezers, air conditioners, dehumidifiers, and ranges. The Harvard, Illinois plant located on South Division Street listed Ernest Polichio as plant manager and its 2,000 employees made television sets.

Various divisions were sold to other companies by the mid-1970s. Rockwell International acquired the company in 1973, selling the appliance operations to Magic Chef, which was later sold to Maytag; in turn, Maytag was later acquired by Whirlpool.

The Milwaukee Admirals hockey team derives its name from Admiral appliances. In 1971, when the team was sold by its original owner to a group of investors, one of the investors, Edwin J. Merar, owned an appliance store; the team was renamed the "Admirals" after the Admiral refrigerators sold in his store.

In 1991, Maytag partnered with Montgomery Ward & Co. for the exclusive utilisation of the Admiral brand on its consumer electronic goods. Montgomery Ward later went bankrupt and closed all its stores. After Maytag's sale to Whirlpool, the brand became exclusive to The Home Depot. During the 1990s, the Admiral brand name was being used on Zenith products, as well as VCRs made by Sharp, also for Montgomery Ward.

The television business continues with AOC International, originally Admiral Overseas Corporation, an international brand of LCD and HDTV display devices.
