= Village Barn =

- Genre: country music
- Presented by: Zebe Carver; Dick Thomas; Dick Dutley; Bob Stanton; Rosalie Allen; Ray Forrest
- Country of origin: United States
- Original language: English

Production
- Camera setup: multi-camera
- Running time: 50, then 30 minutes

Original release
- Network: NBC
- Release: May 24, 1948 – May 29, 1950

Village Barn is the first country music program on American network television. Broadcast by NBC-TV from May 24, 1948 to September 1949 and from January 16 to May 29, 1950, the live weekly variety series originated from The Village Barn, a country music nightclub in New York City's Greenwich Village.

Hosts included Zebe Carver, Dick Thomas, Dick Dutley, Bob Stanton (Robert Haymes), Rosalie Allen and Ray Forrest. Guests for the premiere, a 40-minute broadcast by WNBT, were Texas Ruby and Curly Fox along with The Dixie Boys.

Performers included Pappy Howard and His Tumbleweed Gang, Harry Ranch and His Kernels of Korn, Bill Long's Ranch Girls, Plute Pete (1948–1949) and Romolo De Spirito (1949). Shorty Warren and His Western Rangers appeared in November 1948. In July 1949, Oklahoma governor Roy J. Turner appeared, singing his single, "My Memory Trail".

The show also featured square dancing and audience participation in kiddie car, hobby horse and potato sack races.

== NBC schedules ==
- May 24–October 1948: Monday, 9:10–10 p.m. ET
- October 1948–January 1949: Wednesday, 10:10–11 p.m. ET
- January–May 1949: Wednesday, 8:30–9 p.m. ET
- May–July 1949: Monday, 10–10:30 p.m. ET
- July–September 1949: Thursday, 10–10:30 p.m. ET
- January 16–May 29, 1950: Monday, 9:30–10 p.m. ET

== The Village Barn nightclub ==
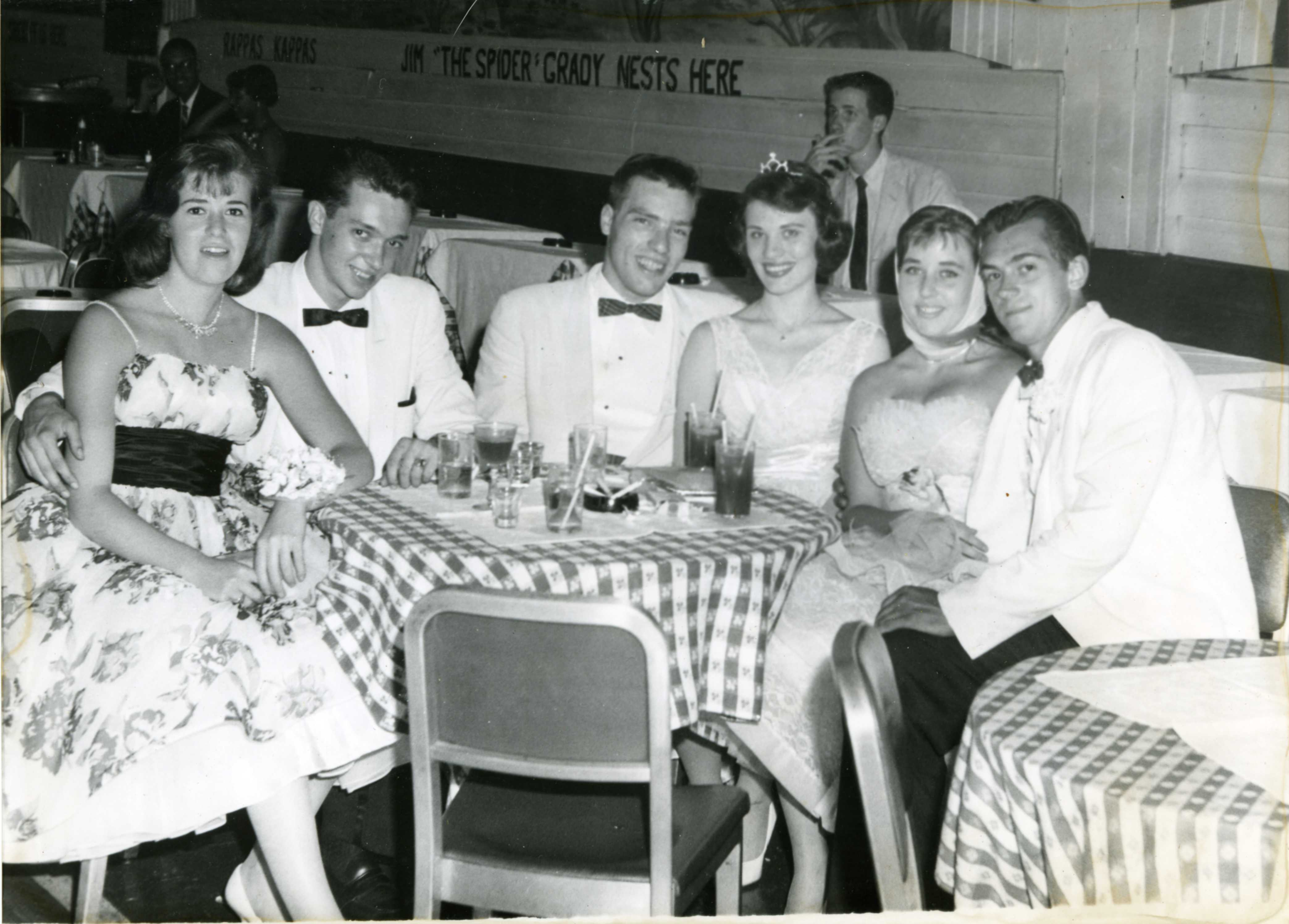
A prom event for A.B. Davis High School, Mount Vernon, NY 1960

The Village Barn, which later became the Generation Club and then was sold to Jimi Hendrix and remodelled into Electric Lady Recording Studios, was opened in November 1930 by owner Meyer Horowitz, who resigned as president and director on October 19, 1951. He was succeeded by his brother, Lawrence (Horowitz) Horton, who subsequently left to pursue other interests. Ownership remained with family members, including Horton, who returned to active management in the early 1960s; a nephew, George Goodman; and son Michael. Meyer Horowitz remained active as a consultant until the Barn closed in August 1967.

In 1931, Rudy Vallée, who had a nearby club, Villa Vallée, discovered Judy Canova at the Barn. Don Cornell, the Hartmans and other stars also got their start at the club.
