= The Laytons =

American television sitcom (1948)

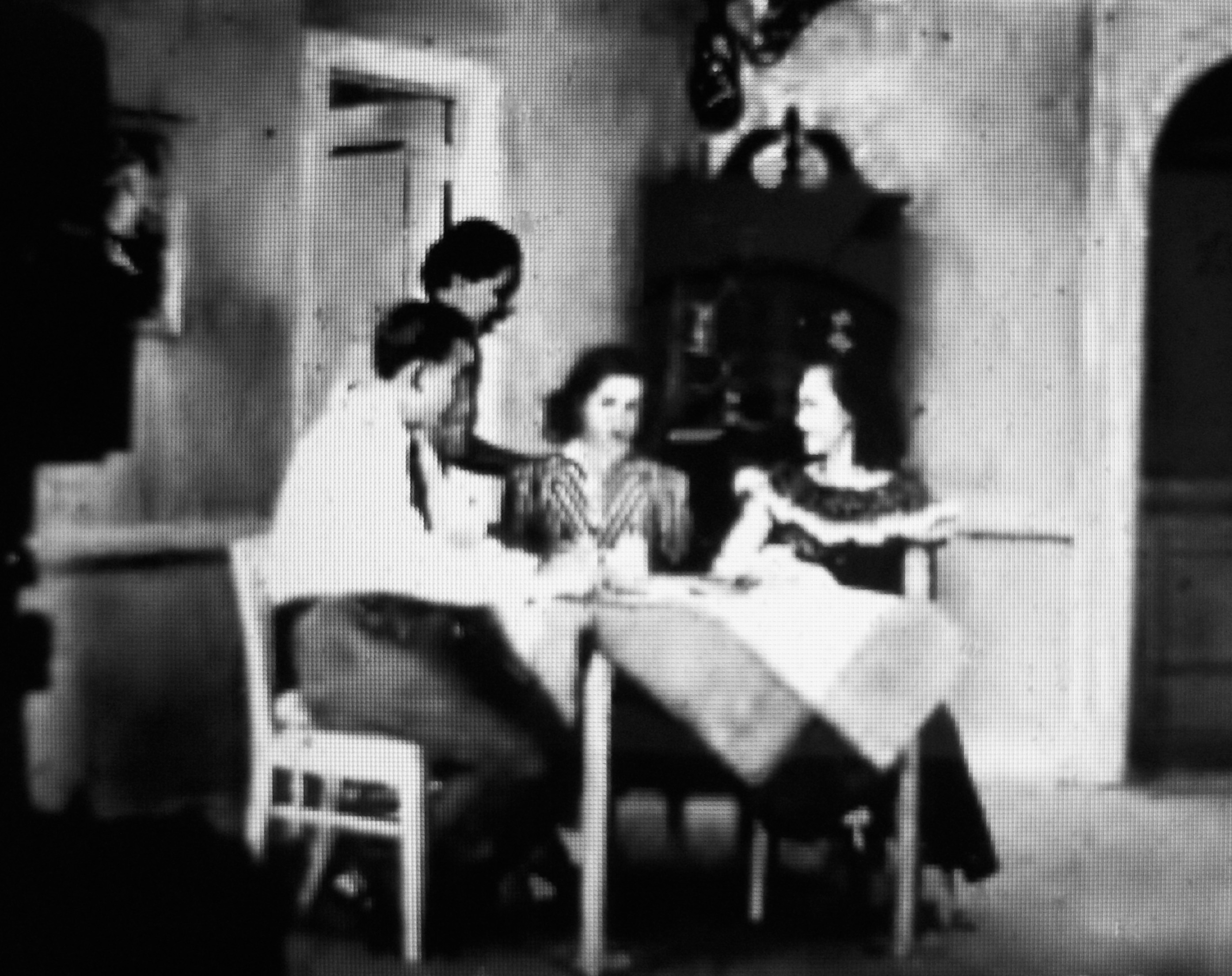
- Billy, Martha, Ginny & Ruth
- Genre: Sitcom
- Created by: Barbara Boothe
- Starring: Amanda Randolph; Vera Tatum
- Country of origin: United States
- Original language: English
- No. of seasons: 1
- No. of episodes: 15

Production
- Producer: O. Gordon
- Running time: 25 minutes

Original release
- Network: WABD (May–June 1948); DuMont (August 1948-October 1948)
- Release: May 19 – October 13, 1948

The Laytons is an American sitcom that was broadcast live on station WABD from May to June 1948, and on the DuMont Television Network (at the time consisting of two stations) from August to October 1948 on Wednesdays from 8:30 to 9:00 p.m. One series cast member was Amanda Randolph, who became the first African-American performer in a regular role on a U.S. network TV series.

== Overview ==
In the 1952 book The TV Writer's Guide author Margaret R. Weiss uses a script from The Laytons as an example of how to write for television situation comedies. She also gives information on how the "extremely low-budgeted show" was made. Episodes were written by series creator Barbara Boothe. For each episode two cameras were used (at the time usually three or four were used for television shows). There were one or two sets, and a maximum of four characters appeared in each episode. The series was sponsored by Bates, Fabrics, Inc., and at the middle of the episodes a live commercial for Bates bedspreads and draperies was broadcast from one of the show's sets.

Characters in The Laytons were Martha, the housekeeper who had worked in the Laytons' home for at least 25 years. She usually came up with solutions to the family's predicaments. Ruth Layton was a stay-at-home housewife, George Layton was a doctor, and Virginia (Ginny) was their teenage daughter. Son Bill was a city official. He and his wife Peggy and daughter Nancy lived in a nearby home. Ruth was played by Vera Tatum, a theater actress who'd taken part in two USO tours in the South Pacific, Korea and Japan. There is no known record of who played the other members of the Layton family.

== Series cast of characters ==
- Martha - housekeeper (Amanda Randolph)
- Ruth Layton - mother (Vera Tatum)
- George Layton - father, a doctor
- Virginia (Ginny) Layton - teenage daughter
- Bill Layton - son, a city official
- Peggy Layton - Bill's wife
- Nancy Layton - Bill's daughter

== Episode status ==
The Layton's series was broadcast live, and there are no known preserved episodes. The script from one episode, Uncle Charlie's Visit, or The Moose Hangs High, which aired August 11, 1948, was printed in the book The TV Writer's Guide.

== See also ==
- List of programs broadcast by the DuMont Television Network
- List of surviving DuMont Television Network broadcasts
- 1948-49 United States network television schedule

== Bibliography ==
- David Weinstein, The Forgotten Network: DuMont and the Birth of American Television (Philadelphia: Temple University Press, 2004) ISBN 1-59213-245-6
- Alex McNeil, Total Television, Fourth edition (New York: Penguin Books, 1980) ISBN 0-14-024916-8
- Tim Brooks and Earle Marsh, The Complete Directory to Prime Time Network and Cable TV Shows 1946–Present, Ninth edition (New York: Ballantine Books, 2007) ISBN 978-0-345-49773-4
