= The Roar of the Rails =

- Genre: Children's
- Country of origin: United States
- Original language: English

Production
- Running time: 15 minutes

Original release
- Network: CBS Television
- Release: October 26, 1948 – December 1949

The Roar of the Rails is an American children's television series that aired on CBS from October 26, 1948, to December 1948, and in October to December 1949. Each episode is 15 minutes long and includes commercials for the toy manufacturer A. C. Gilbert Company.

== Overview ==
Experienced railroad workers explained their job duties, and the work was illustrated by showing A.C. Gilbert's American Flyer model train layouts created for the series.

The series was touted as "honoring heroes of the railroading business" and presenting dramatic stories. One episode told of a locomotive fireman during a 1904 Baltimore Fire; another episode told of a brain surgeon riding on a special train over a flood-weakened roadbed in order to get to a young boy in need of life-saving surgery.

Raymond E. Nelson was the producer, and Robert Bogardus was the writer. Episodes were broadcast on Tuesdays from 7 to 7:15 p.m. Eastern Time.

== Episode status ==
Seven 1949 kinescoped episodes of the series exist at the Library of Congress in the J. Fred and Leslie W. MacDonald Collection. The episodes contain complete commercials for American Flyer electric trains, Erector sets, Microscopes, and Chemistry sets. The episodes include:

1. "Episode at Red Gulch Siding" (aired October 24, 1949)
2. "Runaway Trains" (aired October 31, 1949)
3. "The Johnstown Flood" (aired November 7, 1949)
4. "Operation Explosion" (aired November 14, 1949)
5. "Death Valley Scotty" (aired November 21, 1949)
6. "Baltimore Fire" (aired November 28, 1949)
7. "Acme Plant Fire" (aired December 12, 1949)

== See also ==
- 1948-49 United States network television schedule
