= Stop Me If You've Heard This One =

Comedy radio series

Stop Me If You've Heard This One is a comedy radio series, created by the actor-humorist Cal Tinney (February 2, 1908 – December 2, 1993) and sponsored by Quaker Oats. Hosted by Milton Berle, it aired Saturday evenings at 8:30pm on NBC beginning October 7, 1939.

== Production history ==
The premise was that listeners received prizes for jokes they submitted to the program. The panelists, Harry Hershfield and Jay C. Flippen, were known as "the gagbusters," and their job was to recognize the joke, interrupt Berle and finish telling the joke. If they failed, the listener received more prizes. The show's list of guest panelists included Tinney, cartoonist Peter Arno, Harry McNaughton (later a panelist on It Pays to Be Ignorant), character actor Lionel Stander and Ward Wilson. Dan Seymour was the announcer. The program's director was Joe Rines, and music was supplied by Del Courtney, Ben Cutler and Vincent Travers.

Hershfield was replaced by "Senator" Ed Ford shortly before the series ended on February 24, 1940. Nine months later, Ford, Hershfield and Wilson became regulars on the more popular panel show of joke-tellers, Can You Top This?, which had a long run of 14 years.

== Post-war revival ==
Stop Me If You've Heard This One was revived on the Mutual Radio Network on September 13, 1947, hosted by Roger Bower (1903–1979). Jokes that were used could win $5 plus an additional $10 if the joke could not be completed by panelists Tinney, Lew Lehr, George Givot and Morey Amsterdam. Ted Brown was the announcer, and Harold Hoffman was an occasional guest panelist.

Comedian Lehr (1895–1950), once well known for his humorous contributions to Fox Movietone News and other film shorts, is mainly remembered today for his popular catch phrase, "Monkeys is the cwaziest peoples." The 1947 revival, which first aired on Saturdays at 9pm and then moved to 8:30pm, continued into the next year, ending on October 9, 1948. Around this time, Tinney lost the election in his bid to become the mayor of Tulsa, Oklahoma.

== Television ==
Cal Tinney Productions brought the series to television on March 4, 1948, for a primetime run on the NBC Television Network on Fridays at 8:30 pm ET until April 22, 1949, with hosts Bower and Leon Janney. Radcliff Hall was the announcer, and the panelists were Amsterdam, Lehr, Tinney, and Benny Rubin. Initially a sustaining program, it was dropped by NBC in December 1948 but returned in January 1949 at 9 pm ET on Fridays, sponsored by Bonafied Mills. Larry Schwab was the director.

== Book ==
Jokes by Lehr, Tinney, Bower and Rubin were collected in Stop Me If You've Heard This One, a 1949 Permabook published by Garden City Publishing. Permabooks were designed with an unusual format of a paperback bound with stiff cardboard covers (with a "special wear-resistant finish") to simulate the look and feel of a hardcover book and the company had previously published Best Jokes for All Occasions, edited by Powers Moulton.

The Stop Me If You've Heard This One Permabook featured a two-page foreword by Tinney, a one-page introduction by Bower, 66 pages of jokes by Bower, 85 pages of jokes by Tinney and 82 pages of jokes by Lehr. Under the heading, "P.S.", Rubin only had space for four jokes on two pages, as explained: "Benny Rubin was added to our show just before press time." Tinney's foreword offered some background on the radio program:

The idea for the program Stop Me If You've Heard This One did not come to me in an automat as has been rumored, but in bed. I scribbled a note about it on a nearby pad. The next morning I told the idea to my wife. She said it was no good. So I knew then I had a good idea. The William Morris Agency sold it to the Quaker Oats Company for 19 weeks (1939–1940) on NBC...The show went on ice while I was in the Army. I am happy Norman Livingston of WOR and Phil Carlin of the Mutual Broadcasting System saw fit to revive it. I am happy C.R. Smith of American Airlines provided a commuter service of DC-6's so I could fly back and forth between Oklahoma and New York and perform on it.

== See also ==
- 1948–49 United States network television schedule
