= Quizzing the News =

- Genre: Game show
- Presented by: Alan Prescott
- Starring: Arthur Q. Bryan; Milton Caniff; Mary Hunter; Ray Joseph
- Country of origin: United States
- Original language: English
- No. of seasons: 1

Production
- Camera setup: Multi-camera
- Running time: 25 minutes
- Production company: Robert Brenner Productions

Original release
- Network: ABC
- Release: August 11, 1948 – March 5, 1949

Quizzing the News is an American game show which aired on ABC between August 11, 1948, and March 5, 1949, at 8:00 PM on Monday nights.

== Premise ==
Three panelists had to identify events in the news based on spoken clues and drawings. Master of ceremonies Alan Prescott provided the words, and cartoonist Albee Tribler created the sketches, Panelists included Mary Wickes, Robert Garland, Hope Emerson, and Joan Lloyd.

People viewing the program on TV also had an opportunity to take part and win prizes.

== Production ==
The series was produced by Robert Brenner Productions, with Brenner as the producer, Tom DeHuff was the director, and Milton Subotsky was the writer. After initially originating from an independent station with ABC production personnel in charge, it began originating from WJZ-TV after that station went on the air.

== Reception ==
A review of the September 6, 1948, episode in the trade publication Billboard found that the program had potential but, "there's too much gab and too little action". Reviewer Jerry Franken suggested that the show would be better suited to a 15-minute slot.

== Episode status ==
The series appears to have been wiped, as was the custom of the networks at the time.

== See also ==
- 1948-49 United States network television schedule
