= Picture This (American TV program) =

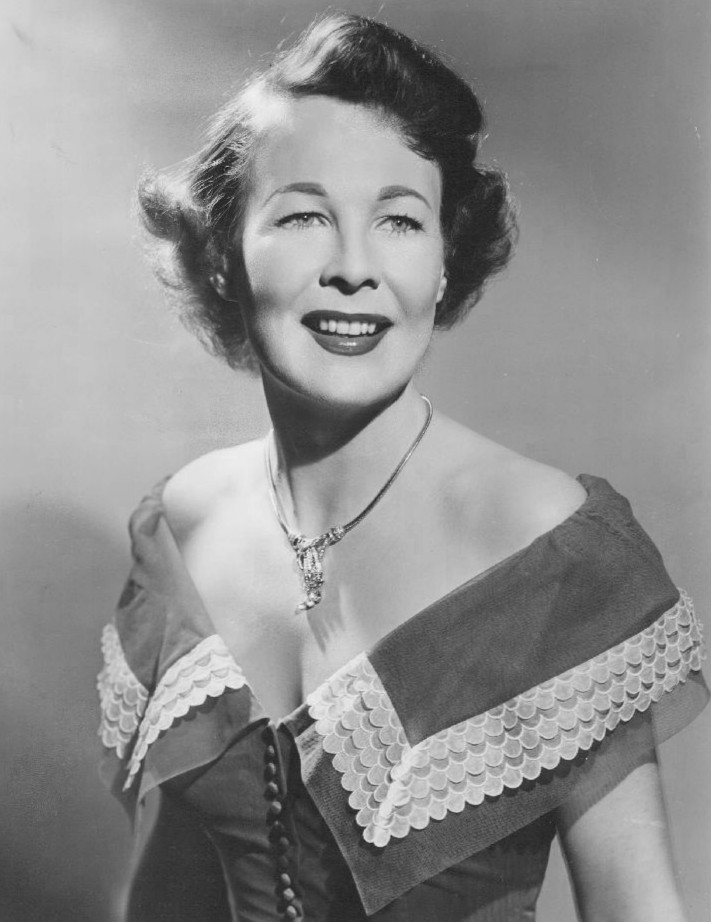
- NBC publicity photo for The Wendy Barrie Show (1950) inscribed "Wendy Barrie, called Television's No. 1 interviewer, meets the great and near-great on her show, Tuesdays and Thursdays on NBC Television"
- Genre: Cartoon
- Presented by: Wendy Barrie
- Country of origin: United States
- Original language: English
- No. of episodes: 13

Production
- Running time: 10 mins.

Original release
- Network: NBC
- Release: November 17, 1948 – February 9, 1949

Picture This is an American television program that was broadcast on NBC and hosted by Wendy Barrie. In this 10-minute program, which ran Wednesdays from 8:20pm to 8:30pm ET, guest cartoonists drew cartoons to illustrate jokes or stories submitted by the studio audience. The first episode aired November 17, 1948 and the final episode February 9, 1949.

The sponsor was Vick Chemical Company, which canceled after 13 weeks. The live program's reach was limited to seven stations on the east coast because at that time CBS had use of the coaxial cable connecting to midwestern stations from 8 to 9 p.m. on Wednesdays.

== See also ==
- 1948-49 United States network television schedule
