= Teenage Book Club =

American TV discussion series (1948)

Teenage Book Club is a weekly primetime television series on ABC which aired from August 27 to October 29, 1948. It was a discussion program about books for teenagers which aired on Friday evenings.

In the show, a panel of participants discussed Hamlet and David Copperfield, as well Your Manners Are Showing: The Handbook of Teenage Knowhow by Betty Betz.

The time slot was originally 7:30 to 8 p.m. Eastern Time on Fridays. In October 1948 the show was moved to 8 to 8:30 p.m. ET on Fridays.

== See also ==
- 1948-49 United States network television schedule
