= We the People (American TV series) =

- Host Dan Seymour, with series logo behind him (1950)
- Genre: Talk show
- Starring: Dwight Weist; Dan Seymour (hosts); Lee Vines (announcer)
- Country of origin: United States
- Original language: English

Production
- Running time: 30 minutes

Original release
- Network: CBS Television (1948-1949); NBC Television (1949-1952)
- Release: June 1, 1948 – January 1, 1952

We the People is an American talk show aired on CBS Television (1948-1949) and then on NBC Television (1949-1952).

== Broadcast history ==
We the People was a 30-minute talk show, first on CBS for one season and then on NBC for two seasons. The host interviewed politicians, celebrities, and everyday people. The interviews tended to be "up close and personal", interviewing celebrities about difficulties they had to overcome. The non-celebrities were usually people who participated in some type of charitable work. The show was sponsored by Gulf Oil and produced by Life magazine.

The TV show aired Tuesdays at 9pm ET, and then Fridays at 8:30pm ET, and was simulcast on radio and TV for a time. The show had been aired on CBS Radio since 1936. In October 1948, We the People was rated #3 on the Hooper Ratings, Hooper being a precursor to Nielsen ratings. On October 24, 1949, NBC began broadcasting We the People from 8:30 to 9 p.m. Eastern Time on Fridays. It originated from WNBT.

Gulf Oil ended its sponsorship of the program on September 26, 1952.

== Famous episodes ==
On August 17, 1948, the American ex-Soviet spy Elizabeth Bentley appeared on the show to urge follow ex-spies to come forward and name names to the U.S. Government. "It isn't enough to just quit being a Communist as I know hundreds have. Come forward now and tell what you know while there's still time to undo the damage we have so foolishly done."

== See also ==
- 1948-49 United States network television schedule
- 1949-50 United States network television schedule
- 1950-51 United States network television schedule
- 1951-52 United States network television schedule
