= The Gulf Road Show Starring Bob Smith =

The Gulf Road Show Starring Bob Smith is an early American prime-time variety television program which aired from 1948 to 1949 on NBC. As the title suggests, it was hosted by Buffalo Bob Smith, who was best known for hosting the daytime children's show Howdy Doody. It is not known how many episodes exist as kinescope recordings, however, Cab Calloway appeared as a guest in a surviving 1949 episode.
