= Tales of the Red Caboose =

- Genre: Children's
- Country of origin: United States
- Original language: English

Production
- Running time: 15 minutes

Original release
- Network: ABC
- Release: October 29, 1948 – January 14, 1949

Tales of the Red Caboose is a short-lived primetime television series that aired on the American Broadcasting Company television network, premiering October 29, 1948 and running until January 14, 1949.

The filmed series originated from WJZ-TV which, at the time, was affiliated with both ABC Television and the DuMont Television Network. Writers were Howard Davis and Steve Baum, and Nat Fowler was the director.

== Synopsis ==
The 15-minute series, sponsored by Lionel Trains, was broadcast on ABC television on Fridays at 7:30 to 7:45pm ET from October 29, 1948 to January 14, 1949. Each episode showed a boy, his father, and their neighbor Don Magee, who was a retired railroad engineer. As they all watched the boy's model train go around the tracks Magee told stories he remembered from his railroading days.

The series was popular enough for a December 1948 Emerson TV advertisement to state that children entertained by television were "thrilled to the Tales of the Red Caboose."

== Critical response ==
A Variety review from October 27, 1948 considered the series' train sequences to be dull and repetitious, and the commentary by "a mythical vet railroad character" to be "brutal." The background narrative was to be interesting train stories. "Instead there was a deadening monotony of ill-phrased and ill-spoken gab without any dramatic or logical continuity." The review did say the show could be rehabilitated into a "sure fire item" for juvenile railroad enthusiasts if the series used some imagination.

== Preservation status ==
No recordings of the program are known to survive.

== See also ==
- 1948-49 United States network television schedule
