= NBC Presents =

American television series

NBC Presents is a live American anthology series produced by the National Broadcasting Company (NBC). A total of thirty-six episodes aired on NBC from January 3, 1949 to October 10, 1949.

Guest stars included Cloris Leachman, John Forsythe, Tom Ewell, Natalie Schafer, and Mary Wickes.
