= Playroom (TV series) =

- Genre: Variety show
- Starring: Hubert Brill
- Country of origin: United States
- Original language: English

Production
- Running time: 30 mins.

Original release
- Network: DuMont
- Release: January 9 – May 9, 1948

Playroom, also known as Brill's Playroom or Hubert Brill's Playroom, is an American television series that aired on the now-defunct DuMont Television Network on Fridays at 7 p.m. (Eastern time) from January 9 to May 28, 1948.

The host, Brooklyn-born Hubert Brill, was a member of the Society of American Magicians and known for playing a minor role in the movie Out Of The Past (1947), which immediately preceded his run on Playroom.

Sponsor magazine described the program as a family variety show featuring "talented guests from the entertainment world."

Playroom was a "sustaining" feature on the DuMont network, attracting no sponsors during its brief run.

== See also ==
- List of programs broadcast by the DuMont Television Network
- List of surviving DuMont Television Network broadcasts

== Bibliography ==
- David Weinstein, The Forgotten Network: DuMont and the Birth of American Television (Philadelphia: Temple University Press, 2004) ISBN 1-59213-245-6
- Alex McNeil, Total Television, Fourth edition (New York: Penguin Books, 1980) ISBN 0-14-024916-8
- Tim Brooks and Earle Marsh, The Complete Directory to Prime Time Network TV Shows, Third edition (New York: Ballantine Books, 1964) ISBN 0-345-31864-1
