= What's It Worth =

American TV art-appraisal series (1948–1953)

- Starring: Sigmund Rothschild (host)
- Country of origin: United States

Production
- Running time: 30 minutes

Original release
- Network: CBS Television
- Release: May 21, 1948 – October 11, 1953

What's It Worth is an early American television series that aired on the CBS Television network from May 21, 1948, and into 1949. The series was later revived in 1952, before finally finishing its run on October 11, 1953.

The show was hosted by self-taught appraiser Sigmund Rothschild (1917–1991), who appraised antiques for celebrities. Gil Fates was Rothschild's assistant. Nelson Case was the announcer for the episodes on Dumont until March 1953, when Bill Wendell replaced him.

As the series title suggests, the audience submitted items of art, and Rothschild would tell them how much they were worth.

Originated by Maurice C. Dreicer, a radio version of the program preceded the TV show.
