= The Alan Dale Show =

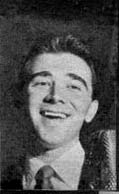
- Alan Dale in 1948 at the beginning of the run for his TV show.
- Starring: Alan Dale; Janie Ford
- Country of origin: United States

Production
- Running time: 15 minutes (DuMont); 30 minutes (CBS)

Original release
- Network: DuMont (1948); CBS (1950-1951)
- Release: August 10, 1948 – January 16, 1951

The Alan Dale Show is an early American television program which ran on the DuMont Television Network in 1948, and then on CBS Television from 1950-1951.

== Broadcast history ==
=== Dumont version ===
The Alan Dale Show was a musical variety show starring singers Alan Dale and Janie Ford and set in a record store. The program, produced and distributed by DuMont, premiered August 10, 1948, and aired Tuesday nights from 7:00 to 7:15 pm ET on most DuMont affiliates.

Other regulars on the program were Karen Rich, The Sapphires, and The Arnold Holop Ensemble. John Shafer was the announcer.

George Sheck and Lou Dahlman were the producers, and Jim Caddigan was the director. Sandy Howard was the writer. The program was sustaining.

The network cancelled the series after a few months, but the series continued locally on DuMont's New York station WABD until March 1949. This show was reportedly the first DuMont series to use kinescopes for network broadcast.

=== CBS version ===
In 1950, Dale hosted a series on CBS which bore the same name as the DuMont series. From June to November 1950, the new Alan Dale Show aired on Friday nights at 11 pm ET. Ford did not star in the CBS version; musical accompaniment was provided by the Milt Green Trio, a trumpet/piano/guitar unit. The show changed to a weekly evening program by December of the year. The CBS version of The Alan Dale Show was cancelled on January 16, 1951.

The CBS version of the program included singer Anne Sterling and the Milt Green Trio musical group. A weekly contest provided opportunities for winners of talent contests to appear on the program. Jack Lescoulie was the producer, and Jan Fogel was the director.

== Episode status ==
One June 1948 episode of the DuMont version, when it was still a local show on DuMont flagship station WABD, is held in the J. Fred MacDonald collection at the Library of Congress.

== Critical response ==
A review of the Dumont version of the program in the trade publication Variety said that the show suffered from lack of a good script, because Dale and Ford were inadequate with ad libs. It also suggested addition of a musical combo and a switch to Dale's performing his songs live, rather than lip-syncing to his recordings.

== See also ==
- List of programs broadcast by the DuMont Television Network
- List of surviving DuMont Television Network broadcasts
- 1948-49 United States network television schedule

== Bibliography ==
- David Weinstein, The Forgotten Network: DuMont and the Birth of American Television (Philadelphia: Temple University Press, 2004)
- Alex McNeil, Total Television, Fourth edition (New York: Penguin Books, 1980) ISBN 0-14-024916-8
- Tim Brooks and Earle Marsh, The Complete Directory to Prime Time Network TV Shows, Third edition (New York: Ballantine Books, 1964) ISBN 0-345-31864-1
