= The Bigelow Show =

American TV variety series (1948–1949)

- Genre: Variety
- Directed by: Preston Wood
- Presented by: Paul Winchell
- Starring: Joseph Dunninger
- Announcer: Dan Seymour
- Country of origin: United States
- Original language: English

Production
- Running time: 30 minutes
- Production company: Young & Rubicam, Inc.

Original release
- Network: NBC
- Release: October 14, 1948 – July 7, 1949
- Network: CBS
- Release: October 5 – December 28, 1949

The Bigelow Show is an American television variety program that was broadcast on NBC from October 14, 1948 to July 7, 1949, and on CBS from October 5 to December 28, 1949.

== Overview ==
Ventriloquist Paul Winchell was host of the program, which featured mentalist Joseph Dunninger. Winchell and his dummy, Jerry Mahoney, provided comedy; Dunninger performed mind-reading acts with guests who were sometimes at sites away from the studio. He also did mind-reading acts with people in the studio audience, "always with a noted personality present to judge the honesty of the performance." He offered to pay $10,000 to anyone who could prove that he read minds with assistance from an accomplice. Guests included:

- United States Representative Aime J. Forand, who was in Washington, D. C., while Dunninger was on a stage in New York. A split-screen technique showed the two.
- Elizabeth Kenny, with Dunninger inside a lead vault.
- Branch Rickey Jr.
- Billy Rose in a remote part of Radio City.

On October 28, 1949, Winchell and Dunninger took the show to Camden, New Jersey, for a two-hour production that included all of the TV show's features. The presentation raised money for a fund that provided activities for underprivileged children in the Camden area.

== Production ==
The producing agency was Young & Rubicam, Inc., with Frank Telford as the producer and Preston Wood as the director. Dan Seymour was the announcer. Music was recorded. The sponsor was Bigelow-Sanford Carpet Company. On NBC The Bigelow Show was broadcast on Thursdays from 9:30 to 10 p.m. Eastern Time. Its competition included Actors Studio on ABC. The trade publication Billboard reported in May 1949 that after NBC's 8-8:30 program was canceled, the three shows that followed it "were said to be insecure", but the Bigelow program seemed stronger than the others. When the program moved to CBS, it was on Wednesdays from 9 to 9:30 p.m. E. T.

== Critical response ==
A review of the premiere episode in the trade publication Variety indicated that aspects of production needed to be improved for the show to achieve its potential. The review praised the talents of Winchell and Dunninger, but it said that use of better staging and better sets would have resulted in a better program. "Sets for both the stars", it said, "comprised merely unattractive drapery backdrops and a couple of tables and chairs tossed together." The review also said that Dunninger's act "left too much room for skepticism" despite the reward offered to anyone who might prove that he had cheated.
