= The Stan Shaw Show =

The Stan Shaw Show is an American daytime television series which aired from 1948 to 1949 on DuMont Television Network flagship station WABD. It also appears in a Pittsburgh TV listing, suggesting it may have been shown on a network level.

== Reception ==
Billboard called it a "static presentation of pop tunes" and felt it needed better direction. Billboard gave a very mixed review of WABD's daytime schedule, though the November 10, 1948, edition of Variety commented that the schedule was no more monotonous than "the steady diet of disk jockeys and/or soap operas fed daytime radio listeners". DuMont expected that the shows would be viewed by housewives who were too busy to watch complex shows (as noted in the 2004 book The Forgotten Network by David Weinstein). Despite the mixed reviews, the schedule proved successful enough that other New York City stations began to increase their daytime offerings in response.

== Episode status ==
None of the episodes are known to survive.
