= Dan Seymour (announcer) =

Radio announcer

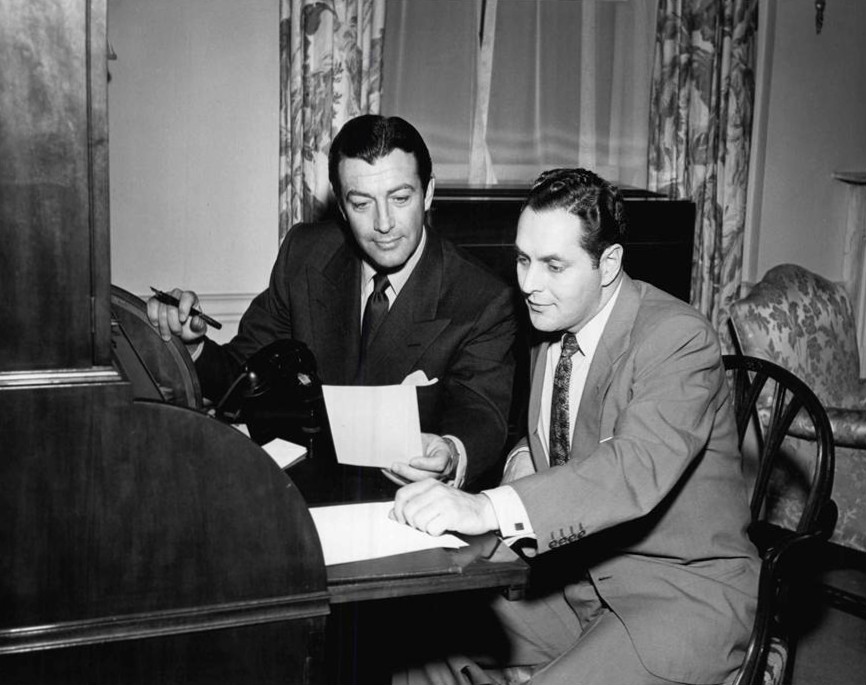
- Robert Taylor and Dan Seymour work on the television and radio program We, the People, 1950
- Born: June 28, 1914; New York City, New York, US
- Died: July 27, 1982 (aged 68); New York City, New York, US
- Occupations: Announcer, master of ceremonies, producer, advertising executive
- Spouse: Louise Scharff (? – 1982, his death)
- Children: 3 daughters, 1 son

Dan Seymour (June 28, 1914 – July 27, 1982) was an announcer in the era of old-time radio and in the early years of television and later became an advertising executive.

== Early years ==
Seymour was born in Manhattan. He attended schools in Paterson, New Jersey, and graduated from Montclair Academy. When he was 18, he traveled to study and teach stage techniques as a guest of the Austrian Ministry of Education. He was a dramatics major at Amherst College.

== Radio ==
Seymour was once recognized as "Radio's best announcer." An obituary observed: "Seymour was best known as the deep-voiced announcer who startled Americans with a convincing but fictional account of Martians landing on Earth in the War of the Worlds broadcast in 1938."

His first job in radio announcing came in 1935 at WNAC in Boston, Massachusetts, after his college graduation. While at the station, he was also an announcer for the Yankee Network. In 1936, he resigned and joined CBS in New York City. His first major assignment there was announcing for Major Bowes Amateur Hour.

A significant assignment early in his career was becoming the announcer on We the People, a job that led to a position with the program's advertising agency, Young and Rubicam.

Other programs on which Seymour worked as announcer were The Henry Morgan Show, The Aldrich Family, Songs by Jack Smith, Aunt Jenny's Real Life Stories, Sing It Again, Bobby Benson, and Original Gillette Community Sing.

Seymour was one of the producers of You and the News.

== Television ==
Seymour was master of ceremonies on Where Was I? and Sing It Again. He was the announcer for Tex and Jinx, Dunninger and Winchell, (also known as The Bigelow Show for part of its run), and The Swift Home Service Club.

== Production ==
In 1945, Seymour, director Tony Leader, and writer Judson Phillips combined efforts to create P.L.S. Productions, a radio producing team, with offices in New York City. The team's first program was You Make the News, which began November 15, 1945, on the Mutual Broadcasting System.

Three months after Seymour became producer of We the People in February 1950, the program's television Nielsen rating had almost doubled.

== Advertising ==
In 1950, Seymour left the on-air side of broadcasting to work in programming. He explained his transition by saying: "I never really enjoyed being a performer. The process of simply reading lines became a bore. I became fascinated with the whole business of mass communications and mass persuasion. This was where the challenge lay."

He first was employed by the Young & Rubicam advertising agency. An invitation to "administer a lift to the General Electric program" for Y & R led to "a permanent role with the agency as a television and radio executive." In 1953, he was appointed a vice president in charge of programming in the agency's radio-television department. He resigned from Y & R October 1, 1955, to become a vice president of the J. Walter Thompson advertising agency. Later, he became president and chief executive officer at the Thompson agency.

== Recording ==
In 1946, Seymour and Kathryn Murray shared narration on an eight-sided 78 rpm album, Arthur Murray Teaches the Fox Trot. The instructional recordings were issued in conjunction with Arthur Murray's dance studios.

== Union activities ==
Seymour was elected to one-year terms on the board of the New York City local of the American Federation of Radio Artists for 1948 and 1949.

== Public service ==
Seymour served on two ad hoc committees appointed by two United States presidents. Under Lyndon Johnson, he was on a committee "to make recommendations for improvements in United States foreign trade." Under Richard Nixon, he was on a committee "to find ways to increase public awareness on personal health."

== Personal life ==
Seymour was married to the former Louise Scharff. They had four children.

== Death ==
Seymour died of a heart attack July 27, 1982, at his apartment in New York City. He was 68. He was survived by his wife, a son, three daughters and 10 grandchildren.
