= Champagne and Orchids =

- Genre: Variety
- Presented by: Adrienne Meyerberg
- Narrated by: Robert Turner
- Country of origin: United States
- Original language: English

Production
- Camera setup: Multi-camera
- Running time: 15 mins.

Original release
- Network: DuMont
- Release: September 6, 1948 – January 10, 1949

Champagne and Orchids is an American variety show broadcast on the now defunct DuMont Television Network. The network series ran from September 6, 1948, to January 10, 1949. Champagne and Orchids was a variety show hosted by Adrienne Meyerberg, billed simply as 'Adrienne', who sang in English, French, and Spanish.

The musical program, produced and distributed by DuMont, aired live at 8 pm EST on Monday nights on most DuMont affiliates. The show had premiered on DuMont's New York station in December 1947. The network series was cancelled in 1949. DuMont replaced the series with Newsweek Views the News.

== Episode status ==
Despite airing during a time when few TV networks preserved much of their programming, at least two episodes survive at the UCLA Film and Television Archive, however the film print of one of these episodes is deteriorating.

== See also ==
- List of programs broadcast by the DuMont Television Network
- List of surviving DuMont Television Network broadcasts
- 1948-49 United States network television schedule

== Bibliography ==
- David Weinstein, The Forgotten Network: DuMont and the Birth of American Television (Philadelphia: Temple University Press, 2004) ISBN 1-59213-245-6
- Alex McNeil, Total Television, Fourth edition (New York: Penguin Books, 1980) ISBN 0-14-024916-8
- Tim Brooks and Earle Marsh, The Complete Directory to Prime Time Network and Cable TV Shows 1946–Present, Ninth edition (New York: Ballantine Books, 2007) ISBN 978-0-345-49773-4
