= The Adventures of Oky Doky =

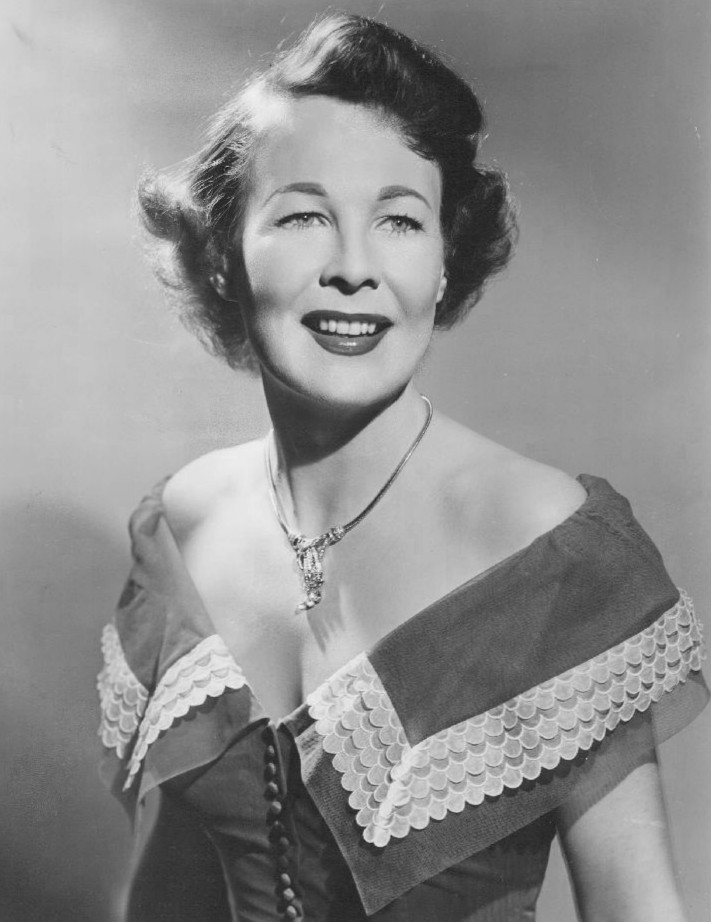
- Cast member Wendy Barrie
- Genre: Children's program
- Starring: Wendy Barrie; Burt Hilber; Pat Barnard; Dayton Allen
- Country of origin: United States

Production
- Running time: 30 minutes (1948-49); 15 minutes (1949)

Original release
- Network: DuMont
- Release: November 4, 1948 – May 26, 1949

The Adventures of Oky Doky is an American children's television program that aired on the DuMont Television Network on Thursdays at 7pm ET from November 4, 1948, through May 26, 1949. Sometime in early 1949, the time slot for the show went from 30 minutes to 15 minutes. In March, the show was cut back to Tuesdays and Thursdays at 6:45pm ET.

The show had many similarities with Howdy Doody, including a frontier/western theme and a cowboy puppet as the title character.

== Background ==
The puppet Oky Doky (created by puppeteer Raye Copeland) was first seen on New York City television station WABD in a children's fashion show program called Tots, Tweens and Teens.

Although there are conflicting stories of when Oky Doky first appeared on local television, it seems likely that his move to network prime time was inspired by the success of the Howdy Doody show.

== Plot and cast ==
Oky Doky ran a dude ranch where children came to play games, perform skits and watch Oky's latest adventures. In each show, Oky would get into trouble, but his magic milk pills gave him the strength to defeat the bad guys.

The cast included Wendy Barrie, Rex Trailer, Burt Hilber and Pat Barnard, with Dayton Allen as puppeteer and the voice of Oky Doky. Frank Bunetta was the producer and director; Ben Zavin was the writer.

== Broadcast changes ==
Early in 1949, the show's name was changed to Oky Doky Ranch and became a twice-a-week show, shortened from 30 minutes to 15 minutes. Oky Doky gained a new costar, a cowboy played by Rex Trailer. This did not prevent the show from being cancelled at the end of the season.

== See also ==
- The Wendy Barrie Show
- Picture This
- List of programs broadcast by the DuMont Television Network
- List of surviving DuMont Television Network broadcasts
- 1948-49 United States network television schedule

== Bibliography ==
- David Weinstein, The Forgotten Network: DuMont and the Birth of American Television (Philadelphia: Temple University Press, 2004) ISBN 1-59213-245-6
- Alex McNeil, Total Television, Fourth edition (New York: Penguin Books, 1980) ISBN 0-14-024916-8
