= Places Please =

Places Please is an American variety show series that aired during primetime on the CBS Television Network from August 16, 1948, to May 24, 1949. Hosted by Barry Wood, each episode was fifteen minutes long and aired on Mondays, Wednesdays, and Fridays, with the other fifteen minutes occupied by local (non-network) programming.

Places Please was a sustaining program. In March 1949, Household Finance Corporation became the sponsor, and the program's name was changed to Backstage with Barry Wood. It moved to 10 p.m. Eastern Time on Tuesdays. The trade publication Variety noted in a review that at the same time the show lost "the informality it formerly had".

== See also ==
- 1948-49 United States network television schedule
