= Club Seven =

American TV variety series (1948–1951)

Club Seven is an American television variety series that was broadcast on ABC. The initial series, with 30-minute episodes, ran from August 12, 1948, through March 17, 1949. It was revived on September 11, 1950, and ran through September 28, 1951. Its episodes varied in length "since it was often truncated by five- or ten-minute newscasts or other series on either end." The show attempted to make viewers feel as if they were in a nightclub.

== Overview ==
=== First version ===
Johnny Thompson was the first host of the show, which was initially titled Thompson's Talent Show. It was one of the first series to originate from the New York studios of ABC. The "informal, low-budget" program "featured new talent, ranging from singers and dancers to acrobats and 'Hank the Mule'." The Bobby Byrne Orchestra provided music.

Club Seven's opening depicted a nightclub's exterior that included a flashing marquee and an advertising board that featured Thompson. A door opened to lead the viewer into the club setting, showing couples dancing while the orchestra played. The announcer said, "Once again we open the magic door in television's brightest nightspot and you're welcome, so won't you come in?"

H. D. Rickert was the producer, and Howard Cordery was the director. The show was sustaining. It was initially broadcast onThursdays from 8 to 8:30 p.m. Eastern Time. In October 1948 it was moved to 8 - 8:30 p.m. E. T. on Thursdays. In November 1948 it was moved to Wednesdays from 8 to 8:30 p.m. E. T., and in January 1949 it was moved to Thursdays from 10:30 to 11 p.m. E. T.

=== Second version ===
When Club Seven returned to the air, Tony Bavaar was the host, and the piano duo Eddie and Rack provided the music. It was on Monday through Friday, nominally from 7 to 7:30 p.m. E. T., but the actual lengths varied depending on programs that ran immediately before and after it.

== Episode status ==
A single 30-minute episode from 1949 is held by the UCLA Film and Television Archive, featuring Lord Buckley as the guest star.

== Critical response ==
Murray Forman, in the book One Night on TV Is Worth Weeks at the Paramount: Popular Music on Early Television, described the show's opening as "a kind of portal through which viewers might, if only in a vicarious relationship to the 'nightclub' performances before them." Forman noted that television was suited to the atmosphere of a nightclub, since both made members of the audience feel closer to performers than did films and large theaters.

In a review of the March 3, 1949, episode in the trade publication Billboard, Paul Ackerman wrote that Club Seven "stacks up well" as a talent show. Ackerman complimented the performances of Thompson and Byrne. He had mixed comments about cameras showing people at tables, saying that it was not a novel approach, but adding that the episode "didn't go overboard on this technique".

== See also ==
- 1948-49 United States network television schedule (Thursdays at 8:30pm ET, 30 minutes)
- 1949-50 United States network television schedule (Mondays thru Fridays at 7:15pm ET, 15 minutes)
- 1950-51 United States network television schedule (Mondays thru Fridays at 7pm ET, 30 minutes)
