= For Your Pleasure (TV series) =

American TV variety series (1948–1949)

For Your Pleasure, featuring singer Kyle MacDonnell, is an American variety television program that was broadcast in two separate runs on NBC from April 15, 1948, until September 10, 1949. Between the first and second run Kyle MacDonnell starred in the similarly formatted Girl About Town (later renamed Around The Town).

== First run ==
Kyle MacDonnell starred in the 15-minute unsponsored program, which also featured the Norman Paris Trio, an instrumental combo. They were supplemented by dancing duos (Jack and Jill, April until June 1948, and Blaire and Deane, June until September 1948). The format had MacDonnell in a nightclub visiting with patrons and singing one or two songs.

MacDonnell's starring role (her first on television) resulted from an NBC executive's seeing her perform on Broadway in the revue Make Mine Manhattan, which opened in January 1948. John Royal, who was the network's vice-president of new developments, decided that he wanted to audition MacDonnell for TV. Thus, on an evening in 1947, NBC's New York station went on the air early so that Royal could watch an audition of MacDonnell on TV from his home, after which the station resumed transmitting a test pattern. Satisfied by the audition, Royal decided to hire her. A review of the April 15, 1948, premiere episode in the trade publication Billboard praised MacDonnell's personality and performance but found the dancing of Jack and Jill and the comedy of Dan Henry less commendable.

== Girl About Town ==
Securing a sponsor resulted in changes in title, format and personnel in the fall of 1948. The Bates Fabric Company, which manufactured bed linens, agreed to advertise on the reworked Girl About Town. When the show debuted on September 8, 1948, MacDonnell and the Norman Paris Trio remained from the original cast, with Johnny Downs added as MacDonnell's press agent. The locale moved from a night club set to sites around New York City where MacDonnell purportedly performed. Live performances were given from a set in a New York studio, supplemented by 16 mm films of landmarks around the city. Earl Wrightson replaced Downs by October. After six months, the program's title was changed to Around the Town. On June 11, 1949, it ended and For Your Pleasure resumed.

== Second run ==
After Girl About Town ended, MacDonnell returned in a 30-minute version of For Your Pleasure, minus dancers. Earl Shelton and his orchestra provided music. After two months, NBC canceled the program, putting the 15-minute programs Chicago Jazz and Stud's Place in the time slot.
