= Stand By for Crime =

American TV police drama

- Genre: Crime drama
- Starring: Boris Aplon; Myron (Mike) Wallace; George Cisar
- Country of origin: United States
- Original language: English
- No. of seasons: 1

Production
- Camera setup: Single-camera
- Running time: 30 minutes

Original release
- Network: ABC
- Release: January 11 – August 27, 1949

Stand By for Crime is an American television police drama that aired on ABC on Saturday nights from January 11 to August 27, 1949. The series stars veteran newsman Mike Wallace under his real name, Myron Wallace. The series is notable for being the first program to be transmitted from Chicago to New York City. It was ABC's component when each network presented 15 minutes of its programming on January 11, 1949, when the Bell System opened its coaxial cable linking TV's Midwestern and Eastern networks.

== Plot ==
Stand By For Crime was unique in its format. The series was seen up to the point of the murder, with Inspector Webb, later Lt. Kidd, looking through the clues. However, before the killer was revealed, viewers were invited to phone in their own guesses as to who the killer was.

== Cast ==
- Boris Aplon as Inspector. Webb
- Myron Wallace as Lt. Anthony Kidd
- George Cisar as Sgt. Kramer

Wallace replaced Aplon as the lead in May 1949 because Aplon, a radio actor, had difficulty working without a script.

== Production ==
Greg Garrison was the producer. Jane Ashman and Nancy Goodwin were writers for this sustaining program. It originated from WENR in Chicago.

== Critical reception ==
A review of the January 11, 1949, episode in the trade publication Variety began, "With a little better pacing, perhaps more blood and guts, there seems to be no reason why this package couldn't become standard TV fare." It also said that the characters were "all keenly etched", and it compliment Aplon for his portrayal of Webb.
