= Court of Current Issues =

American TV public-affairs series (1948–1951)

- Country of origin: United States

Production
- Running time: 30 minutes (1948–1949); 60 minutes (1949–1951)

Original release
- Network: DuMont
- Release: February 9, 1948 – June 26, 1951

Court of Current Issues (initially known as Court of Public Opinion) is a nontraditional court show featuring public-affairs debates. The program aired on the DuMont Television Network from February 9, 1948, through June 26, 1951. Originally a half-hour in length, it expanded to 60 minutes in 1949.

== Overview ==
The program featured oral arguments on topical issues using the format of a courtroom. A judge presided, with people from both sides of the episode's topic taking the roles of attorneys and witnesses. People from "representative national groups" formed the jury, and viewers could call to vote for one of the sides.

Topics discussed on episodes included "Should Radio and Television Editorialize?", "Shall Federal Rent Controls Be Continued?", and "Does the Supreme Court Free Speech Decision Srengthen Our Democracy?".

People who appeared on the program included Arthur M. Schlesinger Jr., Shad Polier, Al Capp, Lev Gleason, Gerald Dickler, George Hamilton Combs, James Lawrence Fly, Arthur Garfield Hays and O. John Rogge,

Irvin Paul Sulds was the producer, and David Lowe was the director. The program was sustaining.

In its last two seasons, the series was scheduled opposite Milton Berle's popular Texaco Star Theater on NBC, hence it did not receive a wide audience.

Following its network demise, the program ran on local TV in New York "for some time".

== Schedule ==
Time Slots for Court of Current Issues
| Months | Day of Week | Time Slot |
|---|---|---|
| February 1948–July 1948 | Tuesdays | 8–8:30 p.m. |
| July 1948–November 1948 | Mondays | 9:30–10 p.m. |
| November 1948–January 1949 | Mondays | 8–9 p.m. |
| January 1949–February 1949 | Mondays | 10–11 p.m. |
| March 1949–April 1949 | Mondays | 9–10 p.m. |
| May 1949–June 1949 | Wednesdays | 9–10 p.m. |
| June 1949–June 1951 | Tuesdays | 8–9 p.m. |

Note: All times Eastern; all broadcasts on DuMont

== Episode status ==
A 14-minute fragment from the March 3, 1949, episode survives at the Paley Center for Media.

== Critical response ==
In 1948, the Radio-Television Critics Circle of New York cited Court of Current Issues as one of several programs, networks, and individuals deserving of kudos for excellence in broadcasting.

United States Congressman Frederic Coudert Jr. recognized Sulds and Court of Current Issues in the Congressional Record in February 1950. His comments there praised the program's originator and stated his wishes that other programs like it might be developed. If so, he said, "We can look forward to a period in our immediate future when we will have the best-informed public of any nation in the world."

== See also ==
- List of programs broadcast by the DuMont Television Network
- List of surviving DuMont Television Network broadcasts

== Bibliography ==
- David Weinstein, The Forgotten Network: DuMont and the Birth of American Television (Philadelphia: Temple University Press, 2004) ISBN 1-59213-245-6
