= Celebrity Time =

American television series

- Also known as: The Eyes Have It (original title)/ Stop, Look, and Listen/ Riddle Me This/ Goodrich Celebrity Time
- Genre: Game show
- Presented by: Douglas Edwards; Paul Gallico; Conrad Nagel
- Country of origin: United States
- Original language: English

Production
- Camera setup: Multi-camera
- Running time: 25 minutes
- Production company: World Video

Original release
- Network: CBS (1948-1949; 1950-1952); ABC (1949-1950)
- Release: November 20, 1948 – September 21, 1952

Celebrity Time (initially known as The Eyes Have It) is an American game and audience participation television series that was broadcast on ABC in 1949 - 1950 and on CBS in 1950 - 1952. The original host during its initial local New York run was Douglas Edwards.

== Rules ==
The show began as a battle of the sexes between teams made up of audience and celebrity panelists, who would be asked questions which involved such topics as guessing names from the news, to identifying film clips.

By June 1952, the program had become a typical musical variety show. Jack Gould, media critic for The New York Times, wrote, "for the most part the change is for the better." He explained that the quiz format had been "somewhat labored", whereas the variety format "is produced with a high degree of skill and moves along quickly."

== Broadcasting history ==
Celebrity Time began as The Eyes Have It on CBS primetime, airing every Saturday and Sunday from November 20, 1948 to March 13, 1949. The show's title changed to Stop, Look, and Listen when Paul Gallico took over as host on November 28, then to Riddle Me This when Conrad Nagel took over the show on December 12; while Nagel hosted through 1952, the title was left behind after March 1949.

The show ran on ABC from April 3, 1949, until March 26, 1950, and on CBS from April 2, 1950, until September 21, 1952. The sponsor was B. F. Goodrich. It was replaced by The Web.

Singer Betty Ann Grove and dancer Jonathan Lucas were regulars on Celebrity Time. The program was produced by Richard Levine and directed by Rai Purdy. George Axelrod was the writer.

=== Panelists ===
Panelists included, at various times, Shirley Booth, Gene Lockhart, Roland Young, Kyle MacDonnell, Kitty Carlisle, Ilka Chase, Sir Thomas Beecham, Slapsie Maxie Rosenbloom, John Daly, Peggy Ann Garner, Boris Karloff, Bela Lugosi, Herman Hickman, Martha Wright, Mary McCarty, and Jane Wilson.

=== Name changes ===
The show had the following names during its run.

- The Eyes Have It (November 20 – 27, 1948)
- Stop, Look, and Listen (November 28 – December 11, 1948)
- Riddle Me This (December 12, 1948 – March 13, 1949)
- Goodrich Celebrity Time (April 3, 1949 – Unknown)
- Celebrity Time (Unknown – September 21, 1952)

== NBC version ==
Celebrity Time
- Also known as: The Eyes Have It
- Genre: Game show
- Presented by: Ralph McNair
- Country of origin: United States
- Original language: English

Production
- Camera setup: Multi-camera
- Running time: 25 minutes

Original release
- Network: WNBW (September–November 1948); NBC (November 1948-June 1949)
- Release: September 25, 1948 – June 19, 1949

The Eyes Have It holds one footnote in television history – it is the only game show to debut as two unrelated programs with different formats, networks, producers, and hosts on the same day.

On November 20, 1948 another show with the same name began on NBC with Ralph McNair as host; NBC's Eyes had actually come first, having been a local show on Washington, D.C. affiliate WNBW since September 25. This version ran until January 27, 1949, with a Sunday-afternoon version running from March 13 (the same day CBS' version, now Riddle Me This, ended) to June 19.

== Episode status ==
The series (including the unrelated NBC version) is believed to have been destroyed due to network practices. No episodes are known to exist under any of the program's five distinct names.

In 2016, a 16mm kinescope was discovered by a film archivist that contained lost footage from two live CBS television shows. In addition to a nearly complete broadcast of What's My Line?, the reel of film also featured the final six minutes of Celebrity Time. Both shows were broadcast on October 1. 1950. Conrad Nagel and Kitty Carlisle were among the celebrities seen from the B F Goodrich sponsored program.
