= 1951 in American television =

This is a list of American television-related events in 1951.

== Events ==
Date	Event	Ref.
March 22	RCA introduces an eight-pound (3.6 kg) monochrome television camera with a 53-pound (24 kg) backpack transmitter, both operated by batteries. It is the first portable television camera.	
May 28	The Federal Communications Commission's approval of the Columbia Broadcasting System's color television system is upheld by the United States Supreme Court.	
June 25	CBS presents its first commercial color telecast, featuring Arthur Godfrey, Ed Sullivan, and Faye Emerson.	
August 11	A double-header between the Brooklyn Dodgers and the Boston Braves becomes the first baseball game to be televised in color.	
September 4	The first live transcontinental television broadcast occurs in San Francisco, California from the Japanese Peace Treaty Conference.	
September 29	CBS presents the first American football game to be presented in color, a college game between the University of California Bears and the University of Pennsylvania Quakers, taking place in Philadelphia	
September 29	NBC broadcasts the first live sporting event coast-to-coast, in all time zones. It was a college football game between the Duke University Blue Devils and the University of Pittsburgh Panthers.	
October 3	The first-ever color telecast of a World Series baseball game.	
October 20	CBS debuts its trademark eye logo.	
November 11	Bing Crosby Enterprises demonstrates black-and-white video recording through using a modified Ampex tape recorder.	
December 6	The National Association of Radio and Television Broadcasters (NARTB) establishes the Television Code, a set of ethical standards for television broadcasting in the public interest. It would be abolished in January 1983.	
December 23	The 1951 NFL Championship Game becomes the first professional football game ever to be telecast on a live, coast-to-coast basis on the DuMont Television Network. DuMont purchased the rights to broadcast the championship game for the next five years. The game resulted in the Los Angeles Rams winning their second pre-Super Bowl era NFL championship by defeating the Cleveland Browns, 24-17.	

== Television programs ==
=== Debuts ===
Date	Debut	Network	Notes/Ref.
January 8	Say It with Acting	NBC	
January 21	With This Ring	DuMont	
February	Public Prosecutor	NBC	
February 3	The Victor Borge Show	NBC	
February 28	Ladies Before Gentlemen	DuMont	
March 3	Watch Mr. Wizard	NBC	
March 6	Once Upon a Tune	DuMont	
March 12	Miss Susan	NBC	Later retitled as Martinsville, U.S.A.
March 23	Beat the Clock	CBS	
April 5	The Range Rider	First-run syndication	
April 7	Major Dell Conway of the Flying Tigers	DuMont	
April 12	DuMont Royal Theater	DuMont	
April 15	The Adventures of Wild Bill Hickok	First-run syndication	
April 15	Music From Chicago	DuMont	
April 19	Casey, Crime Photographer	CBS	
April 29	Not for Publication	DuMont	
May 2	Stage Entrance	DuMont	
May 6	Pentagon	DuMont	
May 7	Jacqueline Susann's Open Door	DuMont	
May 7	Strike It Rich	CBS	
May 11	The Lawrence Welk Show	KTLA	
May 22	Washington Report	DuMont	
May 30	Down You Go	DuMont	
May 30	International Playhouse	DuMont	
June	At Home With Billie Burke	DuMont	
June 2	A Date with Judy	ABC	
June 6	Shadow of the Cloak	DuMont	
June 7	Racket Squad	CBS	
June 15	Midwestern Hayride	NBC	
June 25	What's the Story?	DuMont	
June 28	The Amos 'n Andy Show	CBS	
July 3	Georgetown University Forum	DuMont	
July 6	Front Page Detective	DuMont	
July 13	Hollywood Opening Night	CBS	
August 3	The Ad-Libbers	CBS	
August 3	Tales of Tomorrow	ABC	
August 11	The Adventures of Kit Carson	First-run syndication	
August 27	The Gallery of Madame Liu-Tsong	DuMont	
September	Boston Blackie	First-run syndication	
September 1	Kids and Company	DuMont	
September 3	Search for Tomorrow	CBS	
September 6	Crawford Mystery Theatre	DuMont	
September 6	News Gal	DuMont	
September 6	NFL on DuMont	DuMont	
September 6	Take the Break	DuMont	
September 16	Sky King	NBC	
September 24	Love of Life	CBS	
September 30	The Red Skelton Show	NBC	
October 2	Cosmopolitan Theatre	DuMont	
October 3	Celanese Theatre	ABC	
October 5	ABC Mystery Theater	ABC	
October 5	Schlitz Playhouse of Stars	CBS	
October 9	Keep Posted	DuMont	
October 11	Football This Week	DuMont	
October 13	The Talent Shop	DuMont	
October 14	Goodyear Television Playhouse	NBC	
October 15	I Love Lucy	CBS	
October 18	Foreign Intrigue	First-run syndication	
October 28	Out There	CBS	
November 3	City Hospital	ABC	
November 18	See It Now	CBS	
November 23	The RCA Victor Show	NBC	
November 27	The Dinah Shore Show	NBC	
November 29	This Is Music	DuMont	
December 1	The Pet Shop	DuMont	
December 5	The Name's the Same	ABC	
December 14	Dragnet	NBC	
December 24	Hallmark Hall of Fame	NBC	
December 30	The Roy Rogers Show	NBC	

=== Changes of network affiliation ===
Show	Moved from	Moved to
Author Meets the Critics	ABC	NBC
Candid Camera	NBC	First-run syndication
Twenty Questions	ABC	Dumont
Pro Football Highlights	ABC	Dumont

=== Ending this year ===
Date	Show	Network	Debut	Notes
January 7	Rhythm Rodeo	DuMont	August 6, 1950	
January 16	The Alan Dale Show	DuMont	1948	
January 19	Time for Reflection	DuMont	June 27, 1949	
January 22	Visit with the Armed Forces	DuMont	July 3, 1950	
January 30	Buck Rogers	ABC	April 15, 1950	
March 11	With This Ring	DuMont	January 21, 1951	
March 15	The Nash Airflyte Theater	CBS	September 21, 1950	
March 27	The Billy Rose Show	ABC	October 3, 1950	
March 27	Prudential Family Playhouse	CBS	October 10, 1950	
March 31	Saturday Night at the Garden	DuMont	October 7, 1950	
April	Eloise Salutes the Stars	DuMont	October 1950	
April 3	Sure as Fate	CBS	July 4, 1950	
April 7	Dick Tracy	ABC	September 11, 1950	
April 17	Our Secret Weapon: The Truth	DuMont	October 22, 1950	
April 20	Manhattan Spotlight	DuMont	January 17, 1949	
May 2	Ladies Before Gentlemen	DuMont	February 28, 1951	
May 15	Once Upon a Tune	DuMont	March 6, 1951	
June 17	Music from Chicago	DuMont	April 15, 1951	
June 23	Small Fry Club	DuMont	March 11, 1947 (with the title "Movies for Small Fry")	
June 23	Foodini the Great	CBS	August 23, 1948	
June 26	Court of Current Issues	DuMont	February 9, 1948	
June 29	Jacqueline Susann's Open Door	DuMont	May 7, 1951	
June 30	The Victor Borge Show	NBC	February 3, 1951	
July 6	Okay, Mother	DuMont	November 6, 1948 (on WABD)	
July 18	Four Star Revue	Unknown	Unknown	
August 9	The Al Morgan Show	DuMont	September 2, 1949	
August 24	Broadway Open House	NBC	May 29, 1950	
August 29	Stars Over Hollywood	NBC	September 6, 1950	
August 31	The Ad-Libbers	CBS	August 3, 1951	
September 25	Cavalcade of Bands	DuMont	January 17, 1950	
September 27	Crawford Mystery Theatre	DuMont	September 6, 1951	
September 28	Club Seven	ABC	August 12, 1948	
November 1	Washington Exclusive	DuMont	June 21, 1953	
November 14	International Playhouse	DuMont	May 30, 1951	
November 21	The Gallery of Madame Liu-Tsong	DuMont	August 27, 1951	
November 23	Mohawk Showroom	NBC	May 2, 1949	
December 6	Football This Week	DuMont	October 11, 1951	
December 11	Hands of Murder	DuMont	August 24, 1949	
December 10	Somerset Maugham TV Theatre	CBS; NBC	October 18, 1950	
December 25	Cosmopolitan Theatre	DuMont	October 2, 1951	
December 27	The Bigelow Theatre	CBS; DuMont	December 10, 1950	
December 28	Miss Susan	NBC	March 12, 1951	Also known as Martinsville, U.S.A.

== Television stations ==
=== Station launches ===
Date	City of License/Market	Station	Channel	Affiliation	Notes/Ref.
September 15	Matamoros, Tamaulipas, Mexico (Brownsville/McAllen, Texas, USA)	XELD-TV	7	CBS (primary); ABC (secondary)	First Mexican-licensed television station meant to serve an American-based audience
September 30	Atlanta, Georgia	WLTV	11	ABC	now WXIA-TV, an NBC affiliate.

=== Network affiliation changes ===
Date	City of license/Market	Station	Channel	Old affiliation	New affiliation	Notes/Ref.
January 1	Los Angeles, California	KTSL	2	DuMont	CBS	Now CBS O&O station KCBS-TV.
