= 1953 in American television =

This is a list of American television-related events in 1953.

== Events ==
Date	Event	Ref.
January 15	Harry Truman becomes the first U.S. president to broadcast his farewell address on both radio and television.	
February 18	Lucille Ball and Desi Arnaz sign an $8,000,000 contract to continue the I Love Lucy television series through at least 1955.	
March 25	CBS conceded victory to RCA in the war over color television standards.	
April 3	TV Guide is published for the first time, with 10 editions and a circulation of 1,562,000.	
May 25	KUHT, the first non-commercial educational television station signs on the air in Houston, Texas. This launch preceded the launch of National Educational Television by almost a year.	

== Television programs ==
=== Debuts ===
Date	Program	Network
February 10	Romper Room	First-run syndication
February 16	The Dotty Mack Show	DuMont
March 21	Johnny Jupiter	DuMont
May 8	Jimmy Hughes, Rookie Cop	DuMont
May 10	The Roy Doty Show	DuMont
May 19	The Music Show	DuMont
May 27	The Strawhatters	DuMont
June 20	Bank on the Stars	CBS
June 21	Washington Exclusive	DuMont
June 26	Terry and the Pirates	First-run syndication
June 27	It's a Small World	DuMont
July 5	Old American Barn Dance	DuMont
July 7	Summer Night Theater	DuMont
July 9	Drama at Eight	DuMont
July 11	Medallion Theatre	CBS
August 18	Judge for Yourself	NBC
September 5	The Secret Files of Captain Video	DuMont
September 9	On Your Way	DuMont
September 9	NBA on DuMont	DuMont
September 12	Bonino	NBC
September 13	The George Jessel Show	ABC
September 15	Pulse of the City	DuMont
September 20	Dollar a Second	DuMont
September 21	Marge and Jeff	DuMont
September 25	Melody Street	DuMont
September 29	Make Room For Daddy	ABC
October 2	The Comeback Story	ABC
October 2	The Pepsi-Cola Playhouse	ABC
October 2	The Price of the Family	ABC
October 5	Of Many Things	ABC
October 7	Colonel Humphrey Flack	DuMont
October 7	Life with Elizabeth	First-run syndication
October 8	Where's Raymond?	ABC
October 11	The Man Behind the Badge	CBS
October 16	Nine Thirty Curtain	DuMont
October 25	The Igor Cassini Show	DuMont
October 28	Joseph Schildkraut Presents	DuMont
November 4	Stars on Parade	DuMont
November 8	Opera Cameos	DuMont
November 11	Answers for Americans	ABC
December 30	Concert Tonight	DuMont
Unknown date	Place the Face	CBS
Unknown date	All About Baby	DuMont

=== Changes of network affiliation ===
Show	Moved from	Moved to
My Little Margie	CBS	NBC
The Ernie Kovacs Show	NBC	CBS
Chance of a Lifetime	ABC	Dumont
What's Your Bid?	ABC	Dumont
Man Against Crime	CBS	Dumont/NBC
Pantomime Quiz	NBC	Dumont
Meet Your Congress	NBC	Dumont
Blind Date	NBC	Dumont
Tom Corbett, Space Cadet	NBC	Dumont

=== Ending this year ===
Date	Program	Network	First aired	Notes
February 2	Report Card for Parents	DuMont	December 1, 1952	
March 14	The Pet Shop	DuMont	December 1, 1951	
March 23	Hollywood Opening Night	NBC	July 13, 1951 (on CBS)	
March 26	Biff Baker, U.S.A.	CBS	November 13, 1952	
April 2	The Amos 'n' Andy Show	CBS	1951	
April 3	One Woman's Experience	DuMont	October 6, 1952	
April 10	One Man's Experience	DuMont	October 6, 1952	
May 1	Dark of Night	DuMont	October 3, 1952	
May 1	Hollywood Screen Test	ABC	April 15, 1948	
May 2	Kids and Company	DuMont	September 1, 1951	
May 3	Victory at Sea	NBC	October 26, 1952	
May 6	Happy's Party	DuMont	September 6, 1952	
May 12	Meet the Boss	DuMont	June 10, 1952	
May 20	Stage a Number	DuMont	September 10, 1952	
June 7	Youth on the March	DuMont	October 9, 1949 (on ABC)	
June 12	Tales of Tomorrow	ABC	August 3, 1951	
June 13	Cowboy G-Men	First-run syndication	September 13, 1952	
June 14	New York Times Youth Forum	DuMont	September 14, 1952	
June 20	My Hero	NBC	November 8, 1952	
June 21	The Alan Young Show	CBS	April 6, 1950	
June 21	The Ken Murray Show	CBS	January 7, 1950	
June 28	The Doctor	NBC	August 24, 1952	
June 30	Wisdom of the Ages	DuMont	December 16, 1952	
July 3	Jimmy Hughes, Rookie Cop	DuMont	May 8, 1953	
July 27	It's a Small World	DuMont	June 27, 1953	
July 28	Summer Night Theater	DuMont	July 7, 1953	
July 30	Drama at Eight	DuMont	July 9, 1953	
July 31	Ladies' Date	DuMont	October 13, 1952	
September 1	The Range Rider	First-run syndication	April 5, 1951	
September 11	Gulf Playhouse	NBC	October 3, 1952	
September 12	The Aldrich Family	NBC	October 2, 1949	
September 13	The Old American Barn Dance	DuMont	July 5, 1953	
September 15	Blind Date	DuMont	May 5, 1949 (on ABC)	
September 22	Beulah	ABC	October 3, 1950	
September 27	Trash or Treasure	DuMont	October 1, 1952	
September 28	Shadow of the Cloak	CBS	June 7, 1951	
September 30	A Date with Judy	ABC	July 10, 1952	Second version; first version aired in daytime from 1951 to 1952
October 1	City Hospital	CBS	November 3, 1951 (on ABC)	
October 4	The Roy Doty Show	DuMont	May 10, 1953	
October 6	Where Was I?	DuMont	September 2, 1952	
October 11	Georgetown University Forum	DuMont	July 3, 1951	
October 11	What's It Worth	CBS	May 21, 1948	
November 13	Front Page Detective	DuMont	July 6, 1951	
November 21	Terry and the Pirates	Syndication	June 26, 1953	
December 7	Monodrama Theater	DuMont	May 1952	
December 26	Bonino	NBC	September 12, 1953	
December 26	Four Star Revue	NBC	October 4, 1950	

== Television stations ==
=== Station launches ===
Date	City of license/Market	Station	Channel	Affiliation	Notes/Ref.
January 1	Wilkes-Barre/Scranton, Pennsylvania	WBRE-TV	28	NBC	
January 4	El Paso, Texas	KTSM-TV	9	NBC	
January 11	Youngstown, Ohio	WKBN-TV	27	CBS (primary); ABC/DuMont (secondary)	
January 13	Tucson, Arizona	KOPO-TV	13	CBS (primary); DuMont (secondary)	
January 14	Mobile, Alabama	WALA-TV	10	NBC (primary); ABC/CBS/DuMont (secondary)	
January 20	Jackson, Mississippi	WJTV	25	CBS (primary); ABC/DuMont (secondary)	
January 25	Bangor, Maine	WABI-TV	5	NBC (primary); ABC/DuMont (secondary)	
February 1	Peoria, Illinois	WEEK-TV	25	NBC	
February 8	Lynchburg, Virginia	WLVA-TV	13	CBS (primary); ABC (secondary)	
February 13	New Britain, Connecticut (Hartford)	WKNB-TV	30	NBC (primary); CBS (secondary)	
February 15	Roanoke, Virginia	WROV-TV	27	Independent	
February 18	Lincoln, Nebraska	KOLN-TV	12	ABC	now on channel 10
February 22	Reading, Pennsylvania	WHUM-TV	61	CBS	
February 22	Spokane, Washington	KXLY-TV	4	CBS (primary); ABC (secondary)	
February 23	Spokane, Washington	KXLY-TV	4	CBS (primary); ABC/DuMont (secondary)	
March 1	Johnstown/Altoona, Pennsylvania	WFBG-TV	10	CBS (primary); ABC/DuMont (secondary)	
March 1	Tacoma/Seattle, Washington	KTNT-TV	11	CBS (primary); DuMont (secondary)	
March 1	Wichita Falls, Texas	KWFT-TV	6	CBS (primary); DuMont (secondary)	
March 8	Lawton, Oklahoma (Wichita Falls, Texas)	KSWO-TV	7	ABC (primary); DuMont (secondary)	
March 8	Youngstown, Ohio	WFMJ-TV	21	NBC	
March 9	Sioux City, Iowa/South Dakota	KVTV	9	CBS (primary); NBC/DuMont (secondary)	
March 13	Rome, Georgia	WROM-TV	9	NBC (primary); CBS/DuMont (secondary)	Moved to Chattanooga, Tennessee, to become that area's ABC affiliate in 1958
March 14	Springfield, Missouri	KTTS-TV	10	CBS (primary); ABC/DuMont (secondary)	
March 16	Pueblo, Colorado	KDZA-TV	3	DuMont	
March 17	Green Bay, Wisconsin	WBAY-TV	2	CBS (primary); NBC/DuMont (secondary)	
March 17	Springfield, Massachusetts	WWLP	61	NBC	
March 18	Amarillo, Texas	KGNC-TV	4	NBC (primary); DuMont (secondary)	
March 23	Galveston/Houston, Texas	KGUL-TV	11	CBS	City of license was changed to Houston in 1960.
March 29	Bridgeport, Connecticut	WICC-TV	43	DuMont/ABC	
April 3	Ann Arbor, Michigan	WPAG-TV	20	Independent (primary); DuMont (secondary)	
April 3	Minot, North Dakota	KCJB-TV	13	CBS (primary); ABC (secondary)	
April 4	Amarillo, Texas	KFDA-TV	10	CBS (primary); ABC (secondary)	
April 4	New Castle, Pennsylvania (Youngstown, Ohio)	WKST-TV	45	ABC	Now on channel 33
April 5	Flint, Michigan	WKNX-TV	57	CBS (primary); ABC (secondary)	Now NBC affiliate WEYI-TV on channel 25
April 5	Little Rock, Arkansas	KRTV	17	CBS (primary); ABC/NBC/DuMont (secondary)	
April 7	Fort Lauderdale, Florida	WFTL-TV	23	NBC	
April 9	Reading, Pennsylvania	WEEU-TV	33	NBC	
April 12	Wichita Falls, Texas	KFDX-TV	3	NBC	
April 14	Springfield, Massachusetts	WHYN-TV	55	CBS (primary); DuMont (secondary)	
April 17	Montgomery, Alabama	WCOV-TV	20	CBS	
April 18	Lima, Ohio	WLOK-TV	8	NBC (primary); DuMont/ABC/CBS (secondary)	
April 19	Baton Rouge, Louisiana	WAFB-TV	9	CBS (primary); ABC/NBC/DuMont (secondary)	
April 21	Bethlehem, Pennsylvania	WLEV-TV	51	NBC	
April 29	Tijuana, Baja California, Mexico (San Diego, California, United States)	XETV-TV	6	Bilingual independent	Licensed to Tijuana, but is considered a border blaster serving the San Diego area; Now an affiliate of Mexico's Canal 5.
May 1	Columbia, South Carolina	WCOS-TV	25	NBC (primary); ABC/CBS (secondary)	
May 2	Mesa–Phoenix, Arizona	KTYL-TV	12	NBC	
May 3	Rockford, Illinois	WTVO	17	NBC (primary); DuMont (secondary)	
May 5	Fort Lauderdale/Miami, Florida	WFTL-TV	23	NBC (primary); DuMont (secondary)	
May 5	St. Petersburg/Tampa, Florida	WSUN-TV	38	Independent (primary); CBS/ABC/NBC/DuMont (secondary, select programs)	
May 10	Lubbock, Texas	KCBD	11	NBC	
May 19	Sioux Falls, South Dakota	KELO-TV	11	NBC (primary); ABC/CBS/DuMont (secondary)	
May 23	Zanesville, Ohio	WHIZ-TV	18	NBC (primary); DuMont/CBS/ABC (secondary)	
May 25	Houston, Texas	KUHT	8	Educational Independent	
May 25	San Luis Obispo/Santa Barbara, California	KVEC-TV	6	NBC (primary); ABC/CBS/DuMont (secondary)	
May 31	Duluth, Minnesota	WFTV	38	NBC (primary); CBS/ABC/DuMont (secondary)	
May 31	Lincoln, Nebraska	KFOR-TV	10	CBS	
May 31	St. Petersburg/Tampa, Florida	WSUN-TV	38	ABC	
June 1	Fargo, North Dakota	WDAY-TV	6	NBC (primary); ABC (secondary)	
June 1	Fresno, California	KMJ-TV	24	NBC	
June 3	Bellingham, Washington	KVOS-TV	12	DuMont	
June 6	Kansas City, Missouri	KCTY	25	DuMont	
June 7	Akron, Ohio	WAKR-TV	23	ABC	
June 7	Scranton, Pennsylvania	WDAU	22	CBS	
June 14	Muncie, Indiana	WLBC-TV	49	ABC/CBS/NBC	
June 15	Elmira, New York	WTVE	24	CBS and NBC (joint-primary); ABC/DuMont (secondary)	
June 15	Lafayette, Indiana	WFAM-TV	18	CBS (primary); DuMont (secondary)	
June 17	Decatur, Illinois	WTVP	17	ABC (primary); CBS/DuMont (secondary)	
June 18	Nampa, Idaho	KFXD-TV	6	Independent	First station in Idaho, but lasted less than two months
June 19	Charleston, South Carolina	WCSC-TV	5	CBS	
June 24	Roswell, New Mexico	KSWS-TV	8	NBC (primary); DuMont/CBS/ABC (secondary)	
June 26	Easton, Pennsylvania	WGLV	57	ABC/DuMont	
June 26	San Angelo, Texas	KXTL-TV	8	CBS	
June 29	Pueblo, Colorado	KCSJ-TV	5	NBC	
June 30	Madison, Wisconsin	WKOW-TV	27	CBS	
July 1	Hutchinson/Wichita, Kansas	KTVH	12	CBS (primary); ABC/NBC/DuMont (secondary)	
July 4	Harrisburg, Pennsylvania	WHP-TV	55	DuMont	
July 5	Quincy, Illinois (Hannibal, Missouri/Keokuk, Iowa)	WGEM-TV	10	NBC (primary); ABC (secondary)	
July 6	Harrisburg, Pennsylvania	WTPA	71	NBC	
July 8	Las Vegas, Nevada	KLAS-TV	8	CBS (primary); ABC (secondary)	
July 8	Madison, Wisconsin	WMTV	15	NBC (primary); ABC/DuMont (secondary)	
July 8	Warrensburg/Sedalia, Missouri (Columbia/Jefferson City)	KDRO-TV	6	Independent	
July 9	Fort Smith, Arkansas	KFSA-TV	22	NBC (primary); ABC/DuMont (secondary)	
July 12	Boise, Idaho	KIDO-TV	7	NBC (primary); ABC/DuMont (secondary)	
July 12	Raleigh, North Carolina	WNAO-TV	28	CBS (primary); NBC/ABC/DuMont (secondary)	
July 14	Pittsburgh, Pennsylvania	WKJF-TV	53	Independent	
July 14	Rochester, Minnesota	KROC-TV	10	NBC (primary); DuMont/CBS/ABC	
July 19	Yakima, Washington	KIMA-TV	29	CBS (primary); ABC/NBC/DuMont (secondary)	
July 24	Santa Barbara, California	KEYT-TV	3	NBC (primary); CBS/DuMont (secondary)	
August 1	Greenville, South Carolina	WGVL	23	ABC	
August 1	Kansas City, Missouri	KMBC-TV	9	CBS	Shared time with WHB-TV
August 1	Medford, Oregon	KBES-TV	5	CBS (primary); ABC/NBC/DuMont (secondary)	
August 2	Kansas City, MO/KS	WHB-TV	9	CBS	
August 2	Tacoma/Seattle, Washington	KMO-TV	13	NBC	
August 10	St. Louis, Missouri	WTVI	54	CBS (primary); ABC (secondary)	Now Fox network affiliate KTVI channel 2 (was a Fox O&O from 1997 to 2008)
August 11	Monroe, Louisiana	KFAZ-TV	43	Independent	
August 14	Butte, Montana	KXLF-TV	6	NBC (primary); ABC/DuMont (secondary)	
August 15	Richmond, Virginia	WXEX-TV	8	NBC	
August 15	Wichita, Kansas	KEDD-TV	16	Independent	
August 16	Texarkana, Texas-Arkansas (Shreveport, Louisiana)	KCMC-TV	6	CBS	
August 17	Austin/Rochester, Minnesota	KMMT	6	CBS (primary); DuMont (secondary)	
August 17	Buffalo, New York	WBUF-TV	17	CBS/ABC/DuMont	
August 17	Monterey, California	KMBY-TV	8	ABC/CBS/DuMont/NBC	Shared time with KSBW-TV
August 23	Butte, Montana	KOPR-TV	4	CBS (primary); ABC (secondary)	
August 24	Abilene, Texas	KRBC-TV	9	NBC (primary); CBS/DuMont/ABC (secondary)	
August 24	Tyler, Texas	KETX	19	NBC (primary); CBS/ABC/DuMont (secondary)	
August 25	Ashtabula, Ohio	WICA-TV	15	Independent	
August 25	Macon, Georgia	WETV	47	Independent	
August 25	Pittsburgh, Pennsylvania	WENS	16	Independent	
August 27	Portland, Maine	WPMT	53	DuMont	
August 29	Chico/Redding, California	KHSL-TV	12	CBS (primary); ABC/NBC/DuMont (Secondary)	
August 29	Providence, Rhode Island	WSTG	64	DuMont/ABC	
August 29	Winston-Salem/Greensboro, North Carolina	WTOB-TV	26	ABC (primary); DuMont (secondary)	
August 31	Cambridge/Boston, Massachusetts	WTAO-TV	56	DuMont	
August 31	Pittsburgh, Pennsylvania	WENS	16	ABC	
August 31	West Palm Beach, Florida	WIRK-TV	21	Independent	
September	Sacramento, California	KCCC-TV	40	ABC	
September 1	Columbia, South Carolina	WNOK-TV	19	CBS (primary); DuMont (secondary)	
September 1	Minneapolis, Minnesota	WTCN-TV	11	ABC (primary); DuMont (secondary)	Shared time with WMIN-TV
September 1	St. Paul/Minneapolis, Minnesota	WMIN-TV	11	ABC/DuMont	Shared time with WTCN-TV (now KARE)
September 5	Anderson, South Carolina (Greenville/Spartanburg, SC/Asheville, NC)	WAIM-TV	40	CBS (primary); ABC (secondary)	
September 6	Milwaukee, Wisconsin	WCAN-TV	25	CBS	
September 7	Wilkes-Barre/Scranton, Pennsylvania	WILK-TV	34	ABC (primary); DuMont (secondary)	
September 10	Hartford, Connecticut	WATR-TV	53	ABC/DuMont	
September 11	Salinas/Monterey, California	KSBW-TV	8	NBC (primary); ABC/CBS/DuMont (secondary)	
September 13	San Diego, California	KFSD-TV	10	NBC	
September 15	Tucson, Arizona	KVOA-TV	4	NBC	
September 16	Scranton, Pennsylvania	WILK-TV	34	ABC	
September 17	Charleston, West Virginia	WKNA-TV	49	ABC (primary); DuMont (secondary)	
September 17	Springfield, Illinois	WICS	20	NBC (primary); ABC/CBS/DuMont (secondary)	
September 19	Hampton Roads, Virginia	WVEC	13	NBC	
September 20	Fresno, California	KJEO	47	ABC (primary); CBS (secondary)	
September 21	Colorado Springs, Colorado	KRDO-TV	13	NBC	
September 23	Hannibal, Missouri (Keokuk, Iowa/Quincy, Illinois)	KHQA-TV	7	CBS (primary); DuMont (secondary)	
September 23	Reno, Nevada	KZTV	8	CBS (primary); DuMont/NBC (secondary)	
September 26	Meridian, Mississippi	WTOK-TV	11	CBS (primary); NBC/DuMont (secondary)	
September 27	Evansville, Indiana	WEHT	50	ABC	Originally licensed to Henderson, Kentucky at the time of sign-on
September 27	Kansas City, MO/KS	KCMO-TV	5	ABC (primary); DuMont (secondary)	
September 27	Macon, Georgia	WMAZ-TV	13	CBS (primary); DuMont/NBC/ABC (secondary)	
September 27	Memphis, Tennessee	WHBQ-TV	13	CBS (primary); ABC (secondary)	
September 27	Monroe, Louisiana (El Dorado, Arkansas)	KNOE-TV	8	CBS (primary); ABC/NBC/DuMont (secondary)	
September 27	St. Joseph, Missouri	KFEQ-TV	2	CBS (primary); DuMont (secondary)	
September 28	Albuquerque, New Mexico	KOAT-TV	7	ABC (primary); DuMont (secondary)	
September 29	Buffalo, New York	WBES-TV	59	Independent	
September 30	Cedar Rapids, Iowa	WMT-TV	2	CBS (primary); DuMont (secondary)	
September 30	Greensboro/Winston-Salem, North Carolina	WSJS-TV	12	NBC (primary); ABC (secondary)	
September 30	Sacramento, California	KCCC-TV	40	Independent	
October	Harrisonburg, Virginia	WHSV-TV	3	NBC (primary); CBS/DuMont (secondary)	
October 1	Knoxville, Tennessee	WROL-TV	6	NBC	
October 1	Rockford, Illinois	WREX-TV	13	CBS (primary); ABC/DuMont (secondary)	
October 1	Springfield, Missouri	KYTV	3	NBC	
October 3	Milwaukee, Wisconsin	WOKY-TV	19	ABC (primary); DuMont (secondary)	
October 4	Albuquerque, New Mexico	KGGM-TV	13	CBS	
October 4	Harlingen, Texas (Brownsville/McAllen, Texas)	KGBT-TV	4	CBS (primary); ABC (secondary)	
October 6	Columbus, Georgia	WDAK-TV	28	NBC (primary); ABC/DuMont (secondary)	
October 8	Newport News/Norfolk, Virginia	WACH-TV	33	Independent	
October 8	Yuma, Arizona/El Centro, California	KIVA	11	NBC (primary); ABC/CBS/DuMont (secondary)	
October 9	Harrisonburg, Virginia	WHSV-TV	3	NBC (primary); CBS/DuMont (secondary)	
October 12	Huntington, West Virginia	WKNA-TV	49	ABC/DuMont	
October 14	Albany, New York	WROW-TV	10	ABC (primary); DuMont (secondary)	
October 14	Winston-Salem/Greensboro, North Carolina	WSJS-TV	12	NBC (primary); ABC (secondary)	
October 15	Cedar Rapids, Iowa	KCRI-TV	9	ABC	
October 15	Johnstown/Altoona, Pennsylvania	WARD-TV	56	CBS (primary); ABC (secondary)	This station moved to Jeannette, Pennsylvania, in 1997; now on channel 19.
October 15	Portland, Oregon	KOIN-TV	6	CBS	
October 16	Pensacola, Florida	WPFA-TV	15	DuMont	
October 18	Knoxville, Tennessee	WTVK	26	CBS (primary); DuMont (secondary)	
October 18	Louisville, Kentucky	WKLO-TV	21	ABC (primary); DuMont (secondary)	
October 20	Peoria, Illinois	WTVH	19	CBS (primary); ABC/DuMont (secondary)	
October 20	St. Louis, Missouri	KSTM-TV	36	DuMont	
October 22	Norfolk, Virginia	WTOV-TV	27	ABC	
October 23	Houston, Texas	KNUZ-TV	40	DuMont	
October 24	Phoenix, Arizona	KOOL-TV and KOY-TV	10	ABC	Shared-time stations
October 24	Wheeling, West Virginia	WTRF-TV	7	NBC (primary); ABC (secondary)	
October 25	Eureka, California	KIEM-TV	3	CBS (primary); ABC/DuMont (secondary)	
October 25	Lancaster, Pennsylvania	WLBR-TV	15	Independent	
October 26	Johnson City, Tennessee	WJHL-TV	11	CBS (primary); NBC/DuMont (secondary)	
October 31	Festus/St. Louis, Missouri	KACY	14	Independent	
November 1	New Orleans, Louisiana	WJMR-TV	61	CBS (primary); ABC (secondary)	
November 1	Oklahoma City, Oklahoma	KTVQ	25	ABC (primary); NBC (secondary)	
November 1	Rochester, New York	WHEC-TV	10	CBS (primary); ABC (secondary)	
November 1	Rochester, New York	WVET-TV	10	CBS (primary); ABC (secondary)	Shared time with WHEC-TV
November 1	Temple, Texas (Waco/Killeen, Texas)	KCEN-TV	6	NBC	
November 2	Lake Charles, Louisiana	KTAG-TV	25	CBS (primary); ABC/DuMont (secondary)	
November 7	Columbia, South Carolina	WIS-TV	10	NBC (primary); ABC (secondary)	
November 8	Oklahoma City, Oklahoma	KMPT	19	Independent	
November 9	Billings, Montana	KOOK-TV	2	CBS (primary); ABC/NBC/DuMont (secondary)	
November 9	York, Pennsylvania (Harrisburg/Lebanon)	WNOW-TV	49	DuMont	
November 11	Parkersburg, West Virginia/Marietta, Ohio	WTAP-TV	15	NBC (primary); CBS/ABC/DuMont (secondary)	
November 14	Champaign, Illinois	WCIA-TV	3	CBS (primary); ABC/DuMont/NBC (secondary)	
November 14	Des Moines, Iowa	KGTV	17	Independent	
November 15	Columbus, Georgia	WRBL	4	ABC	
November 15	Evansville, Indiana	WFIE-TV	61	NBC (primary); ABC/DuMont (secondary)	
November 15	Lake Charles, Louisiana	KTAG-TV	25	CBS (primary); ABC/DuMont (secondary)	
November 15	Topeka, Kansas	WIBW-TV	12	CBS (primary); ABC/DuMont/NBC (secondary)	
November 16	Tulare/Fresno, California	KVVG	27	Independent	
November 21	Fort Wayne, Indiana	WKJG-TV	33	NBC	
November 22	Lewiston, Maine	WLAM-TV	17	DuMont	
November 22	Oklahoma City, Oklahoma	KLPR	19	ABC	
November 23	Augusta, Georgia	WJBF-TV	6	NBC (primary); CBS/DuMont (secondary)	
November 23	Fort Dodge, Iowa	KQTV	21	NBC	
November 25	Fort Lauderdale, Florida	WITV	17	ABC/DuMont	
November 26	Boise, Idaho	KBCI-TV	2	CBS (primary); ABC/DuMont (secondary)	
November 26	Flint, Michigan	WTAC-TV	16	ABC.(primary); DuMont (secondary)	
November 29	Nashville, Tennessee	WSIX-TV	8	CBS (primary); ABC (secondary)	Now an exclusive ABC affiliate on channel 2
November 29	Waterloo/Cedar Rapids, Iowa	KWWL-TV	7	NBC (primary); DuMont (secondary)	
December 1	Bloomington, Illinois (Champaign/Decatur/Springfield, Illinois)	WBLN	15		
December 1	Harrisburg, Illinois	WSIL-TV	3	ABC	
December 1	Panama City, Florida	WJDM-TV	7	Independent	Later became a primary NBC/secondary CBS and ABC affiliate before end of the year
December 1	Worcester/Boston, Massachusetts	WWOR-TV	14	Independent	Not to be confused with today's WWOR-TV in Secaucus, New Jersey
December 6	Portsmouth, Virginia	WTOV-TV	27	DuMont	
December 6	Princeton, Indiana	WRAY-TV	52	unknown	
December 7	Charlotte, North Carolina	WAYS-TV	36	ABC (primary); NBC/DuMont (secondary)	
December 10	Green Bay, Wisconsin	WFRV-TV	5	ABC	
December 10	Seattle, Washington	KOMO-TV	4	ABC	
December 11	Anchorage, Alaska	KTVA	11	CBS (primary); DuMont (secondary)	
December 13	Jacksonville, Florida	WJHP-TV	36	Independent	
December 13	Pittsburg, Kansas (Joplin, Missouri)	KOAM-TV	7	NBC	
December 14	Asbury Park, New Jersey	WRTV	58	Independent	
December 14	Anchorage, Alaska	KFIA	2	NBC/ABC (joint primary)	
December 15	Stockton, California	KTVU	36	NBC	
December 17	Eau Claire/La Crosse, Wisconsin	WEAU	13	NBC (primary); ABC/CBS/DuMont (secondary)	
December 18	Midland, Texas	KMID-TV	2	NBC	
December 19	Bismarck, North Dakota	KFYR-TV	5	NBC (primary); ABC/CBS/DuMont (secondary)	
December 19	Danville, Illinois	WICD	24	ABC	
December 19	Jackson, Mississippi	WLBT	3	NBC (primary); ABC (secondary)	
December 19	Little Rock, Arkansas	KATV	7	CBS (primary); ABC (secondary)	
December 20	Idaho Falls, Idaho	KID-TV	3	CBS (primary); DuMont/NBC/ABC (secondary)	
December 20	Oklahoma City, Oklahoma	KWTV	9	CBS (primary); Paramount (secondary)	
December 20	Portland, Maine	WCSH-TV	6	NBC	
December 21	Columbia, Missouri	KOMU-TV	8	NBC (primary); CBS/DuMont (secondary)	
December 22	Greenville/New Bern/Washington, North Carolina	WNCT-TV	9	CBS (primary); ABC/DuMont (secondary)	
December 24	Denver, Colorado	KOA-TV	4	NBC	
December 24	Kearney, Nebraska	KHOL-TV	13	CBS (primary); DuMont (secondary)	
December 24	Steubenville, Ohio (Wheeling, West Virginia)	WSTV-TV	9	CBS (primary); ABC (secondary)	
December 31	Charlotte, North Carolina	WAYS-TV	18	NBC (primary); ABC (secondary)	
December 31	Greenville, South Carolina	WFBC-TV	4	NBC	
Unknown date	Des Moines, Iowa	KGTV	17	Independent	
Unknown date	Duluth, Minnesota	WFTV	38	CBS/NBC	
Unknown date	Elmira/Corning, New York	WTVE	24	DuMont	
Unknown date	Meridian, Mississippi	WCOC-TV	30	Independent	

=== Network affiliation changes ===
Date	City of license/Market	Station	Channel	Old affiliation	New affiliation	Notes/Ref.
September 28	Albuquerque, New Mexico	KOB-TV	4	NBC (primary); ABC/CBS/DuMont (secondary)	NBC (primary); ABC/DuMont (secondary)	
October 4	Albuquerque, New Mexico	KOB-TV	4	NBC (primary); ABC/DuMont (secondary)	NBC (primary); DuMont (secondary)	
November 29	Nashville, Tennessee	WSM-TV	4	NBC (primary); ABC/CBS/DuMont (secondary)	NBC (primary); ABC/DuMont (secondary)	
Unknown	Denver, Colorado	KBTV	9	CBS (primary); ABC (secondary)	DuMont (primary); ABC (secondary)	
Unknown	Duluth, Minnesota	WFTV	38	CBS/NBC (joint primary); ABC/DuMont (secondary)		

=== Station closures ===
Date	City of license/Market	Station	Channel	Affiliation	First air date	Notes/Ref.
July 13	Roanoke, Virginia	WROV-TV	27	Independent	February 15, 1953	First commercial station in the United States to permanently go off the air. In this case, it closed due to financial distress
August 12	Nampa, Idaho	KFXD-TV	6	Independent	June 18, 1953	
December 15	Oklahoma City, Oklahoma	KTVQ	25	ABC (primary); NBC (secondary)	November 1, 1953	
December 18	Buffalo, New York	WBES-TV	59	Independent	September 29, 1953	

== See also ==
- 1953 in television
- 1953 in film
- 1953 in the United States
- List of American films of 1953
