= Know Your New York =

- Presented by: Don Roper; Dennis James
- Starring: Evelyn Peterson
- Country of origin: United States

Production
- Running time: 15 minutes (1947-1948); 30 minutes (1971-1972)

Original release
- Network: DuMont (1947–1948); Syndicated (1971–1972)
- Release: 1947 – 1948

Know Your New York is an early American television game show. Broadcast on DuMont Television Network's flagship station WABD in New York City, the series aired in 1947, broadcast at 8:45pm ET on Wednesdays. The 15-minute series was sponsored by Bonded Auto Sales, and was hosted by Don Roper, who was assisted by Evelyn Peterson. Although broadcast only on a single station, it is notable as an early example of a television game show. The show returned to the air in 1971, with Dennis James as host, and ran for one season from 1971 to 1972.

== Format ==
In the episode broadcast on 20 November 1947, the names of several viewers who wrote in were plucked out of a bowl, and were each phoned for the answer to a question. The questions were based on slides on landmarks in New York, which were to be identified. Correct answers gave the winner $5; all contestants received a turkey whether they answered correctly or not.

The Bonded U-Drive-It auto firm bought a 13-week sponsorship of "Know Your New York" in September 1947.

== Reception ==
Billboard magazine described the series as "low-budget", but also said that "none of the ideas in the program is essentially new, but they are well put together and run smoothly" and that "it is a watchable program and obviously tuned to the budget of the medium local sponsor".

== Episode status ==
Although examples of WABD's local shows are known to exist from as far back as 1948, such as Swing Into Sports and Photographic Horizons, none are known to exist from 1947. The series is most likely lost, and likely was never kinescoped in the first place, as kinescoping was still a very new technology.

The syndicated version likely exists, at least in part, in Dennis James's personal archives; James maintained copies of every show he ever hosted in the archive during his lifetime.

== See also ==
- List of programs broadcast by the DuMont Television Network
- List of surviving DuMont Television Network broadcasts

== Bibliography ==
- David Weinstein, The Forgotten Network: DuMont and the Birth of American Television (Philadelphia: Temple University Press, 2004) ISBN 1-59213-245-6
- Alex McNeil, Total Television, Fourth edition (New York: Penguin Books, 1980) ISBN 0-14-024916-8
- Tim Brooks and Earle Marsh, The Complete Directory to Prime Time Network TV Shows, Third edition (New York: Ballantine Books, 1964) ISBN 0-345-31864-1
