= They're off =

"They're off" is a phrase used to report that a horse race has begun.

It could be:

- They're Off (game show), a 1949 television gameshow
- "They're Off", a 1975 phonograph-record game with multiple grooves recorded on a side (see Unusual types of gramophone records#Parallel grooves)
