= Crawford Mystery Theatre =

- Created by: Jerry Fairbanks
- Starring: Warren Hull (host); Bob Sheppard (announcer); John Howard; Anne Gwynne; Walter Sande
- Country of origin: United States
- No. of episodes: 26

Production
- Running time: 30 minutes (1951–1952)
- Production company: Jerry Fairbanks Productions

Original release
- Network: DuMont
- Release: September 6 – September 27, 1951

Crawford Mystery Theatre (originally planned for broadcast on NBC as Public Prosecutor before being dropped by NBC, then picked up by DuMont) is an American television program broadcast on the DuMont Television Network Thursdays at 9:30pm ET beginning on September 6, 1951. The series was also seen in first-run syndication. The series ran from 1951 to 1952.

== Broadcast history ==
John Howard hosted the first two episodes, with Warren Hull taking over thereafter. A panel of guests attempted to guess the solutions to episodes. The show was sponsored by Crawford Clothes. It was on DuMont on Thursdays from 9:30 to 10 p.m. Eastern Time. After it left the network, it was broadcast in New York through February 1952 with the original title Public Prosecutor.

Originally filmed in 1947-48 by Jerry Fairbanks Productions and titled Public Prosecutor, the program starred Howard, Walter Sande, and Anne Gwynne in a typical murder-mystery setting. The show was originally planned to be broadcast on NBC.

The series is most notable for being television's first filmed series (although not the first filmed series broadcast), paving the way for later filmed TV series such as I Love Lucy four years later.

After the network cancellation, the program continued to air locally on DuMont's flagship station, WABD in New York City. The final program aired on February 28, 1952.

== Episode status ==
An episode of Crawford Mystery Theatre survives at the Museum of Broadcast Communications in Chicago. Internet Archive has two episodes, "The Case of the Comic-Strip Murder" (September 20, 1951) and "The Case of the Man Who Wasn't There" (January 17, 1952). Public Prosecutor has over 20 surviving episodes.

== See also ==
- List of programs broadcast by the DuMont Television Network
- List of surviving DuMont Television Network broadcasts
- 1951-52 United States network television schedule

== Bibliography ==
- David Weinstein, The Forgotten Network: DuMont and the Birth of American Television (Philadelphia: Temple University Press, 2004) ISBN 1-59213-245-6
- Alex McNeil, Total Television, Fourth edition (New York: Penguin Books, 1980) ISBN 0-14-024916-8
- Tim Brooks and Earle Marsh, The Complete Directory to Prime Time Network and Cable TV Shows 1946–Present, Ninth edition (New York: Ballantine Books, 2007) ISBN 978-0-345-49773-4
