= List of programs broadcast by the DuMont Television Network =

This is a list of programs broadcast by the DuMont Television Network, which operated in the United States from 1942 to 1956. All regularly scheduled programs which were aired on the DuMont network are listed below, regardless of whether they originated at DuMont. Some DuMont network series were actually broadcast from Baltimore's WAAM-TV, Chicago's WGN-TV, Cincinnati's WCPO-TV, or Philadelphia's WFIL. These stations were not DuMont-owned stations but were affiliated with the network. Programs which aired on the DuMont network but originated from affiliate stations are noted in this list.

Some DuMont programs were produced by other networks but aired on DuMont. For example, Play the Game (1946) was produced by ABC, but aired on DuMont since ABC had no network until 1948. The Admiral Broadway Revue (1949) aired on both NBC and DuMont at the same time, as did Man Against Crime (1953). Pick the Winner (1952) aired on both CBS and DuMont. Some programs, such as Flash Gordon (1954) aired both in syndication and on DuMont. These exceptions are noted in the list.

Programs produced at DuMont facilities but which aired on other networks, such as CBS's The Honeymooners (1955), are not included in this list. Also not included in this list are the numerous local programs seen on individual DuMont stations, Paramount television series, and programs created by successor companies (DuMont Broadcasting Corporation, Metropolitan Broadcasting Company, Metromedia, and Fox Broadcasting Company). See those articles for programs produced or aired by those companies.

A timeline of DuMont network programs appears at the end of this list. For a list of surviving DuMont programs, see List of surviving DuMont Television Network broadcasts

== Former programming ==
=== Scripted ===
==== Drama ====
- Captain Video and His Video Rangers (1949–1955)
- Charlie Wild, Private Detective (1952) - moved from ABC
- Chicagoland Mystery Players (1947–1950) - moved from WGN-TV
- Crawford Mystery Theatre (1951–1952)
- Flash Gordon (1954–1955)
- Front Page Detective (1951–1952)
- Jimmy Hughes, Rookie Cop (May–July 1953)
- Major Dell Conway of the Flying Tigers (1951–1952)
- Man Against Crime (1953–1954) - moved from CBS, simulcast with NBC
- Not for Publication (1951–1952)
- Rocky King, Detective (1950–1954) - a.k.a. Inside Detective
- Shadow of the Cloak (1951–1952)
- Summer Night Theater (July 1953)
- The Adventures of Ellery Queen (1950–1951)
- The Cases of Eddie Drake (1952)
- The Gallery of Madame Liu-Tsong (Aug–Nov 1951)
- The O'Neills (Sept 1949–Jan 1950)
- The Plainclothesman (1949–1954)
- The Secret Files of Captain Video (Sept 1953–May 1954)
- The Stranger (1954–1955)
- This Is the Life (Sept 1952–Fall 1953)
- Tom Corbett, Space Cadet (1953–1954)

==== Sitcoms ====
- Colonel Humphrey Flack (1953–1954) - a.k.a. The Fabulous Fraud
- Easy Aces (Dec 1949–June 1950)
- It's a Business (March–May 1952)
- Marge and Jeff (1953–1954)
- Mary Kay and Johnny (1947–1948)
- Off the Record (October 1948)
- The Ernie Kovacs Show (Apr 1954–Apr 1955) - moved from CBS
- The Family Genius (Sept 1949)
- The Goldbergs (Apr–Oct 1954) - moved from CBS
- The Growing Paynes (1948–1949)
- The Laytons (Aug–Oct 1948)
- The Morey Amsterdam Show (1949–1950) - moved from CBS

==== Anthology ====
- The Bigelow Theatre (1950–1951) - moved from CBS
- Cosmopolitan Theatre (Oct–Dec 1951)
- Dark of Night (1952–1953)
- Drama at Eight (July 1953)
- DuMont Royal Theater (1951–1952)
- Ethel Barrymore Theatre (Sept–Dec 1956)
- Frontier Theatre (May–Sept 1950)
- Gruen Playhouse (Jan–Aug 1952) - moved from ABC
- Hands of Murder (1949–1951) - a.k.a. Hands of Mystery and Hands of Destiny
- Joseph Schildkraut Presents (1953–1954)
- Love Story (April–June 1954)
- Night Editor (Mar–Sept 1954)
- Nine Thirty Curtain (1953–1954)
- One Man's Experience (1952–1953) - a.k.a. One Man's Story
- One Woman's Experience (1952–1953) - a.k.a. One Woman's Story
- Program Playhouse (June–Sept 1949)
- Pulse of the City (1953–1954)
- Rebound (Nov 1952–Jan 1953)) - moved from ABC
- Studio 57 (1954–1955) - a.k.a. Heinz Studio 57
- Your Story Theatre (Nov 1950–May 1951) - a.k.a. Story Theatre and Durkee Story Theatre

==== Soap opera ====
- A Woman to Remember (Feb–July 1949)
- Faraway Hill (Oct–Dec 1946)
- Highway to the Stars (Aug–Oct 1947)

=== Children's programming ===
- Adventure Playhouse (April–May 1950)
- All About Baby (1953–1955)
- Happy's Party (1952–1953)
- Johnny Jupiter (1953)
- Kids and Company (1951–1952)
- King Cole's Birthday Party (1948–1949) - a.k.a. Birthday Party
- Serving Through Science (1945–1947)
- Small Fry Club (1947–1951)
- The Adventures of Oky Doky (1948–1949)
- The Magic Cottage (1949–1952)
- The Roy Doty Show (May–Oct 1953)
- Your Television Babysitter (1948–1952)

=== Unscripted ===
==== Court show ====
- Court of Current Issues (1948–1951)
- Famous Jury Trials (1949–1952)
- They Stand Accused (1949–1954)

==== Docuseries ====
- A Visit With the Armed Forces (1950–1951)
- Better Living TV Theater (1954)) - moved from ABC
- The Big Idea (1952–1953)
- Key to the Missing (1948–1949)

==== Fashion ====
- And Everything Nice (1949–1950)
- Fashions on Parade (1948–1949)

==== Game show ====
- Battle of the Ages (Jan–July 1952)
- Bingo at Home (1956–58)
- Blind Date (1953) - moved from NBC
- Broadway to Hollywood (1949–1954) - a.k.a.Headline Clues
- Cash and Carry (1946–1947)
- Charade Quiz (1947–1949)
- Dollar a Second (1953–1954)
- Down You Go (1951–1955)
- Gamble on Love (July–Aug 1954)
- Have a Heart (May–June 1955)
- Hold That Camera (Aug–Dec 1950)
- Know Your New York (1947–1948)
- On Your Way (1953–1954)
- Pantomime Quiz (1953–1954) - moved from NBC
- Play the Game (Sept–Dec 1946)
- Quick on the Draw (Jan–Dec 1952)
- Spin the Picture (1949–1950)
- Talent Jackpot (July–Aug 1949)
- They're Off (July–Aug 1949)
- Time Will Tell (Aug–Oct 1954)
- Twenty Questions (1951–1954) - moved from ABC
- What's Your Bid? (May–July 1953) - moved from ABC

==== Music ====
- Amanda (November 1, 1948–1949)
- Concert Tonight (1953–1955)
- Flight to Rhythm (Mar–Sept 1949) - a.k.a. The Delora Bueno Show
- Hotel Broadway (Jan–Mar 1949)
- It's Alec Templeton Time (June–Aug 1955)
- Jazz Party (1958)
- Music from Chicago (April–June 1951)
- The Music Show (1953–1954)
- Old American Barn Dance (July–Sept 1953)
- Opera Cameos (1953–1955)
- Rhythm Rodeo (1950–1951)
- Teen Time Tunes (Mar–July 1949)
- The Hazel Scott Show (1950)
- The Stan Shaw Show (1948–49)
- The Susan Raye Show (1950)
- The Vincent Lopez Show (1949–1951)
- This Is Music (1951–1952)
- Windy City Jamboree (March–June 1950)

==== News and public affairs ====
- Camera Headlines (1948–1949)
- DuMont Evening News (1954–1955)
- I.N.S. Telenews (1948–1949)
- Keep Posted (1951–1954) - a.k.a. The Big Issue
- Meet the Boss (June 1952–May 1953)
- Meet Your Congress (1953–1954) - moved from NBC
- New York Times Youth Forum (1952–1953)
- News Gal (1951)
- Newsweek Views the News (1948–1950) - a.k.a. Newsweek Analysis
- Operation Information (July–Sept 1952)
- Operation Success (1948–1949)
- Our Secret Weapon: The Truth (1950–1951)
- Pentagon (1951–1952) - a.k.a. Pentagon Washington
- Pick the Winner (Aug–Nov 1952) - simulcast with CBS
- The Drew Pearson Show (1952–1953) - moved from ABC
- The Power of Women (July–Nov 1952)
- The Walter Compton News (June 1947–1948)
- Washington Exclusive (June–November 1953)
- Washington Report (May–August 1951)
- Time for Reflection (1950–1951)
- Your School Reporter (1948–1952)

==== Panel show ====
- Guess What? (Jul–Aug 1952)
- Ladies Before Gentlemen (Feb–May 1951)
- Life Begins at Eighty (1952–1955) - moved from NBC
- One Minute Please (1954–1955)
- Photographic Horizons (Jan–Mar 1949)
- Report Card for Parents (Dec 1952–Feb 1953)
- What's the Story? (1951–September 23, 1955)
- Where Was I? (1952–1953)
- Wisdom of the Ages (1952–1953)
- With This Ring (Jan–Mar 1951)

==== Religious ====
- Elder Michaux (Oct 1948–Jan 1949) - moved from WTTG
- Life Is Worth Living (1952–1955)
- The Week in Religion (1952–1954)
- Youth on the March (1952–1953) - moved from ABC

==== Sports ====
- Amateur Boxing Fight Club (1949–1950)
- Bowling Headliners (1949–1950) - moved from ABC
- Boxing From Eastern Parkway (1952–1954)
- Boxing From Jamaica Arena (1948–1949)
- Boxing From St. Nicholas Arena (1954–August 6, 1956) - moved from NBC
- Boxing From Sunnyside Gardens (1949–1950)
- Famous Fights From Madison Square Garden (Sept–Dec 1952)
- Fishing and Hunting Club (1949–1950) - a.k.a. Sports for All
- Football Sidelines (Oct–Dec 1952)
- Football This Week (Oct–Dec 1951)
- Golf Instruction with Phil Galvano (1952–1954)
- Major League Baseball on DuMont (1947-1949)
- NBA on DuMont (1953–54)
- NFL on DuMont (1951–1955)
- Pro Football Highlights (Oct 1951–Dec 1952) - moved from ABC
- Saturday Night at the Garden (1950–1951)
- Scoreboard (14 April 1948 – 22 April 1949) - a.k.a. Russ Hodges' Scoreboard
- Swing Into Sports (1948)
- Wrestling From Columbia Park Arena (1948)
- Wrestling From Jamaica Arena (1948)
- Wrestling From Marigold (1949–1955)
- Wrestling From Sunnyside Gardens (1949)

==== Talent show ====
- Chance of a Lifetime (1953–1955) - moved from ABC
- Doorway to Fame (1947–1949)
- Stage a Number (1952–1953)
- The Original Amateur Hour (January 18, 1948–September 25, 1949)
- Stars Are Born (1951)
- The Talent Shop (1951–1952)

==== Talk show ====
- At Home with Billie Burke (June 1951–Spring 1952)
- Author Meets the Critics (1952–1954) - moved from ABC
- Eloise Salutes the Stars (1950–1951)
- Georgetown University Forum (1951–1953)
- Jacqueline Susann's Open Door (1951)
- Manhattan Spotlight (1949–1951)
- The Igor Cassini Show (Oct 1953–Feb 1954)
- The Wendy Barrie Show (Jan–July 1949) - moved from ABC

==== Variety show ====
- The Al Morgan Show (1949–1951)
- Admiral Broadway Revue (January–June 1949) - simulcast with NBC
- Café de Paris (1949)
- Cavalcade of Bands (1950–1951)
- Cavalcade of Stars (1949–1951)
- Champagne and Orchids (1948–1949)
- Chez Paree Revue (1950)
- Cinema Varieties (Sept–Nov 1949)
- Country Style (July–Nov 1950)
- Dinner Date (Jan–July 1950)
- The Dotty Mack Show (1953) - a.k.a. Girl Alone
- Front Row Center (1949–1950)
- Guide Right (1952–1954)
- Johnny Olson's Rumpus Room (1949–1952)
- Ladies' Date (1952–1953)
- Look Upon a Star (1947)
- Monodrama Theater (May 1952–December 7, 1953)
- Okay, Mother (1949–1951) - moved from WABD
- On Stage, Everybody (1945)
- Once Upon a Tune (March–May 1951)
- Playroom (Jan–May 1948)
- Stage Entrance (1951–1952)
- Star Time (Sept. 1950–March 1951)
- Starlit Time (April 1950–November 1950)
- Stars on Parade (1953–1954)
- The Alan Dale Show (1948)
- The Arthur Murray Party (1950–1951; 1952–1953) - moved from ABC
- The Ilona Massey Show (Nov 1954–Jan 1955)
- The Joan Edwards Show (1950)
- The Most Important People (1950–1951) - a.k.a. Mr. and Mrs. Carroll
- The Paul Dixon Show (1952–1955)
- The Ted Steele Show (1949) - moved from NBC
- The School House (Jan–Apr 1949)
- The Strawhatters (1953–1954)
- Window on the World (Jan–Apr 1949)

==== Unknown genre ====
- The Armed Forces Hour (1949–1951) - moved from NBC
- The Face of the War (June 1942–1945)
- Feature Theatre (March 1949–August 1950)
- Hollywood Preview (Sept 1955–June 1956)
- International Playhouse (May–Nov 1951)
- It's a Small World (June–July 1953)
- The Jack Eigen Show (1947–1951)
- The Johns Hopkins Science Review (1950–1954) - moved from CBS
- Melody Street (1953–1954)
- Mystery Theater (1949–1950) - a.k.a. DuMont Mystery Theater
- The Needle Shop (1948–49)
- The Pet Shop (1951–1953)
- Screen Mystery (Apr–Oct 1950)
- Steve Randall (7 Nov. 1952 – 30 Jan. 1953) - a.k.a. Hollywood Off Beat
- Take the Break (2 July 1951–1953)
- Thrills and Chills from Everywhere (June 1942–June 1946)
- Trash or Treasure (1952–1953) - a.k.a.Treasure Hunt
- TV Department Store (January 1949)
- TV Shopper (Nov 1948–Dec 1950) - a.k.a. Your TV Shopper and The Kathi Norris Show
- The Twinkle in Your Eye (1950)
- Western Movie (1946–1947)
- You Asked for It (1950–1951)
- Your Victory Garden (1943)

=== Specials/ Events/ One-Off Broadcasts ===
- Talk Fast, Mister (December 18, 1944) - one-hour drama filmed by RKO Radio Pictures
- Don McNeill's Breakfast Club (May 12, 1948) - kinescope, simulcast with ABC Radio
- A Christmas Carol (December 25, 1947)
- Coaxial Cable Opening (January 11, 1949)
- Miss U.S. Television Grand Finals (September 30, 1950)
- Top 12 Business Leaders (May 28, 1951) - 30-minute special from the 21 Club in NYC
- Passaic: Birthplace of Television and the DuMont Story (November 14, 1951) - 15-minute special
- Adlai Stevenson Speech From Salt Lake City (14 October 1952) - telecast of a speech by presidential candidate Adlai Stevenson
- General Foods 25th Anniversary Show: A Salute to Rodgers and Hammerstein (28 March 1954) - Two-hour special, aired on all four TV networks
- Army-McCarthy Hearings (April 22 – June 17, 1954) - simulcast with ABC
- Light's Diamond Jubilee (24 October 1954) - Two-hour special sponsored by General Electric, aired on all four TV networks
- A.N.T.A. Album of 1955 (28 March 1955) - closed circuit fundraising appeal sponsored by American National Theater and Academy (ANTA) and CARE)
