= Coleman Dowell =

American writer

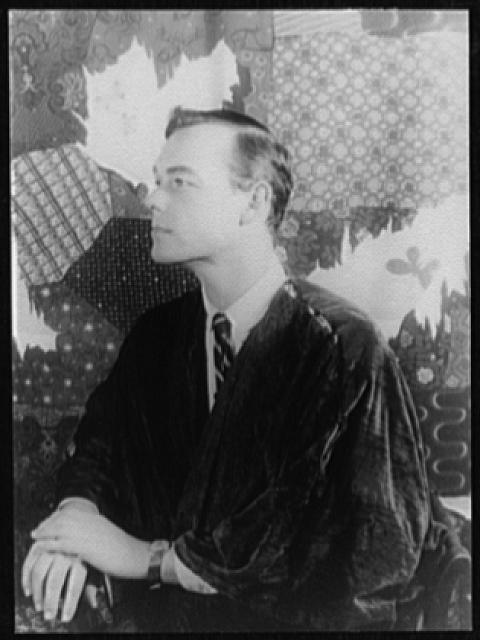
Coleman Dowell (1957) Photo by Carl Van Vechten

Robert Coleman Dowell (May 29, 1925 – August 3, 1985) was an American writer.

== Biography ==
Robert Coleman Dowell was born to Mordon and Beulah Violett Dowell in Adairville, Kentucky on May 29, 1925. He was one of six children in his family. Dowell attended several country schools, among them, a one-room school where Latin and Greek were taught. His last two years of high school were at Simpson County High in Franklin, Kentucky, a new county school where he was on the school paper. Dowell served in the U.S. Army, Medical Corps from 1944 to 1945 and as an assistant to the prosecution in war crimes trials in Manila in 1945–46. He was eventually promoted to the rank of sergeant. During this period he also attended the University of the Philippines. Dowell returned home to the U.S. in 1946 and settled in Louisville, Kentucky for a few years where he was a full-time member of the National Guard. Here he wrote the musical play that brought him to New York City.

Dowell moved to New York in 1950, initially finding work as a model for automobile and airline ads and as a typist. From 1950 to 1953 Dowell was employed as a songwriter and lyricist for the Dumont television show, Once Upon a Tune, which starred Bea Arthur, Elaine Stritch, Alice Ghostley, and Charlotte Rae. Dowell composed nearly 1,000 works for weekly broadcast. He also worked as David Merrick's protégé and with John La Touche on the abortive Broadway musical version of the 1933 play Ah, Wilderness! by Eugene O'Neill.

In January 1957, Dowell met Carl Van Vechten, author of The Tattooed Countess. Dowell wanted permission to attempt to adapt the piece to the musical stage. He played for Van Vechten selections from a score for The Tattooed Countess and won Van Vechten's approval for the rights. Carl Van Vechten was known to his friends as "Carlo." His career included stints as a music critic for The New York Times, as a novelist during the 1920s, and as a photographer for which he never sought nor received payment. He photographed many of the major figures in the arts world. His wife was Fania Marinoff, a retired actress.

Van Vechten introduced Dowell into his circle of friends which included many celebrities: Isak Dinesen, Langston Hughes, Leontyne Price, Geoffrey Holder, Gloria Vanderbilt, Sidney Lumet, Eileen Herlie, Kim Hunter, Barbra Streisand, Diahann Carroll, Pearl Bailey, Antony Armstrong-Jones, Tallulah Bankhead, Luise Rainer, Laurence Olivier, Gertrude Stein, the Gish sisters, the Duke and Duchess of Windsor, George Kaufman, Noël Coward, and Maurice Sendak, among others.

The Tattooed Countess, which opened in 1961, was panned by the critics and closed within a few days. Dowell, who had written the book, score and lyrics, tried his luck with another theatrical experiment, Eve of the Green Grass. This play was presented at the Chelsea Art Theatre in 1965 and starred Kim Hunter. Seeing his play on the stage, Dowell concluded that the theatre was not his metier and turned his attention to writing novels. This was done without the mourning that the failure of The Tattooed Countess had induced. Dowell's early experiences in the theatre were used in two magazine articles, At Home with Drosselmeier and A Handful of Anomalies which were published in Bomb Magazine in 1984 and 1985, respectively. His theatrical career was also included in his unfinished autobiography, A Dark Book, which was published by The Dalkey Archive Press in June 1993 under the title of A Star-bright Lie.

Dowell had found only disillusionment in the theater. He decided to seek his fortune as a writer of fiction. Dowell had already experienced some success in writing fiction. His short story, 'Alter Frau im Garten' had been published in 1962. Over a fifteen-year period Dowell wrote five novels: One of the Children is Crying (1968), Mrs. October was Here (1974), Island People (1976), Too Much Flesh and Jabez (1977), and White on Black on White (1983). Remarkably, the first four novels had been written concurrently. These novels were intricate both in concept and in form. It was during this period that Dowell enjoyed the critical praise and friendship of such noted authors as Walter Abish, Thom Gunn, John Hawkes, Ann Lauterbach, Gilbert Sorrentino, Maurice Sendak, Edmund White, and Tennessee Williams.

Dowell was talented and he yearned to be famous. He very much needed a popular readership. One of the Children is Crying, one of his most accessible books, was widely reviewed, with reviews appearing in Boston, Denver, Hollywood, Houston, Louisville, Milwaukee, Sacramento, and Tulsa. Since One of the Children is Crying had been published earlier in England under the title, The Grass Dies, reviews also appeared in England and Ireland. Surprisingly, reviews for Dowell's second novel, Mrs. October was Here, were meager and from rather obscure sources. Nevertheless, this novel was always mentioned as being Dowell's favorite. Island People was a favorite with all critics and other authors. It was called Dowell's masterpiece. Supporters of this novel included Tennessee Williams, Gilbert Sorrentino, Ihab Hassan, and Walter Abish, but reviews were still not as plentiful as had been the case with his first novel. The New York Times called it "a work of art" and brought Dowell some national attention. Too Much Flesh and Jabez was the least reviewed of Dowell's novels. The New York Times, nevertheless, called it "a tour de force." White on Black on White received many, but mixed, reviews. Dowell was given a tribute before the publication of his last novel in the Fall 1982 issue of The Review of Contemporary Fiction. This issue, called the Paul Bowles-Coleman Dowell number, contains the major critical articles on Dowell which had appeared up to this date. Throughout the 1970s, Dowell maintained a working relationship with critic and author, Richard Lebherz. Lebherz encouraged Dowell's literary ambitions. Dowell received critical praise from the leading authors and critics of his day. Reviewers often cited the complexity of his style, but, as Edmund White wrote in a 1976 New York Times review of "Island People", "Once inside the book, the reader encounters teeming, charged emotions dark and restive with pain." He never received the popular support he so desperately needed. His later years were plagued by ill health. Although there were good times, Dowell could not escape feelings of disillusionment, suicide, or as he put it, "the balcony beckons me." In the early morning hours on Saturday August 3, 1985, Dowell, reportedly despondent, leapt from his 15th floor apartment balcony overlooking Fifth Avenue. As is the case with so many other writers or artists, the attention focused on Coleman Dowell accelerated after his death. In 1987, The Houses of Children: Collected Stories was published by Weidenfeld & Nicolson and this publishing company also reissued One of the Children is Crying. Too Much Flesh and Jabez was also made available via the Dalkey Archive Press.

Three major works by Dowell were left unfinished. These include Eve of the Green Grass, a novel; Dowell's autobiography entitled, A Dark Book and his private journal 1968–1984 which is a running diary of his life, writings, attitude towards people, and also includes personal observations for stories. Two excerpts from A Dark Book had been published earlier in Bomb magazine under the titles: At Home with Drosselmeier (#10, Fall 1984) and A Handful of Anomalies (#13, Fall 1985). These deal with Dowell's early adventures in New York City and his relationship with Carl Van Vechten, as well as his early theatrical career.

Dowell was given a final tribute at his apartment on November 3, 1985. A large number of famous personalities representing the worlds of dance, art, literature, music, theater, and education toasted their friend and praised his accomplishments as a gifted composer, poet, playwright, novelist, and critic.

A generous donation from an anonymous donor established the Coleman Dowell Series at Dalkey Archive Press. The donor's contribution enables the Dalkey Press to publish one book a year in this series.

He was a gay man and was celebrated locally as a commercially successful gay artist.

== Short fiction works ==
Published in New Directions, An Anthology of Prose and Poetry

- "The Keepsake" (#26, 1973)
- "The Birthmark" (#27, 1973)
- "I Envy You Your Adventure" (#28, 1974)
- "First Person Biography" (#29, 1974)
- "Victor: (#30, 1975)
- "If Beggars were Horses" (#31, 1975)
- "Singing in the Clump" (#32, 1976)
- "The Moon, the Owl, my Sister" (#33, 1976)
- "Ham's Gift" (#35, 1977)
- "My Father was a River" (#36, 1978)

Published in The English quarterly, Ambit

- "I am the Beast" (#61, 1975)
- "The Drought Ends" (#65, 1976)
- "Her Good Man Gone" (#69, 1977)
- "A Lifetime Proposition" (#73, 1978)
- "Patridge House" (#76, 1978)
- "The Snake House" (#79, 1979)
- "The Silver Swanne" (#89, 1980)
- "Person Waiting" (#94, 1983)
- "Kitty" (#100, 1985)

Published by Conjunctions

- "The Great Godalmighty Bird" (#4, 1983)
- "The Silver Swanne" (#5, 1983)
- "Eve of the Green Grass" (novel excerpt) (#6, 1984)
- "Writings on a Cave Wall" (#8, 1985)
