= A.N.T.A. Album of 1955 =

- Genre: Television special
- Directed by: Barry Shear
- Country of origin: United States
- Original language: English

Production
- Producer: Gilbert Miller
- Camera setup: Multi-camera
- Running time: 120 minutes
- Production companies: American National Theatre and Academy (ANTA)

Original release
- Network: DuMont Television Network
- Release: March 28, 1955

A.N.T.A. Album of 1955 is a closed-circuit American television special produced to raise funds for the relief agency CARE that was telecast live from the now-demolished Adelphi Theatre in New York City on March 28, 1955. It is listed as a DuMont Television Network show, and is on Clarke Ingram's list of DuMont programming content stored at the UCLA Film and Television Archive.

At the time, DuMont was in the process of being shut down. Among those who appeared in the special included Helen Hayes, Lena Horne, Victor Moore, Ezio Pinza, and Elaine Stritch.

== Preservation status ==
A copy of the special is in the collection of the UCLA Film and Television Archive.

== See also ==
- List of programs broadcast by the DuMont Television Network
- List of surviving DuMont Television Network broadcasts
- Kinescope

== Bibliography ==
- David Weinstein, The Forgotten Network: DuMont and the Birth of American Television (Philadelphia: Temple University Press, 2004) ISBN 1-59213-245-6
- Alex McNeil, Total Television, Fourth edition (New York: Penguin Books, 1980) ISBN 0-14-024916-8
- Tim Brooks and Earle Marsh, The Complete Directory to Prime Time Network TV Shows, Third edition (New York: Ballantine Books, 1964) ISBN 0-345-31864-1
