= Better Living TV Theater =

American TV documentary series (1952–1954)

- Starring: Fischer Black (moderator)
- Country of origin: United States

Production
- Running time: 30 minutes

Original release
- Network: ABC (1953); DuMont (1954)
- Release: June 21, 1953 – August 29, 1954

Better Living TV Theater is an American television documentary program originally broadcast on ABC and later on the DuMont Television Network. The documentary series, featuring moderator Fischer Black, debuted on June 20, 1953. The ABC version was a summer replacement series which aired on Sunday afternoons. The final ABC broadcast occurred on August 16, 1953.

On April 21, 1954, the DuMont Network began to air the series in prime time. Better Living TV Theater aired on Wednesday nights at 10:30 pm EST, until June, when the program was moved to Sunday nights. The final broadcast was on August 29, 1954.

== Episode status ==
One episode of this series survives at the Paley Center for Media.

== See also ==
- List of programs broadcast by the DuMont Television Network
- List of surviving DuMont Television Network broadcasts

== Bibliography ==
- David Weinstein, The Forgotten Network: DuMont and the Birth of American Television (Philadelphia: Temple University Press, 2004) ISBN 1-59213-245-6
