= The Week in Religion =

- Presented by: Rabbi William S. Rosenbloom; Reverend Robbins Wolcott Barstow; Reverend Joseph N. Moody
- Country of origin: United States

Production
- Running time: 60 mins. (1952-1953); 30 mins. (1953-1954)

Original release
- Network: DuMont
- Release: March 16, 1952 – October 18, 1954

The Week in Religion is an American religious television program broadcast on the now defunct DuMont Television Network. The series ran from March 16, 1952, to October 18, 1954. The program gave equal time to Jewish, Protestant, and Roman Catholic speakers; it was hosted by Rabbi William S. Rosenbloom, Reverend Robbins Wolcott Barstow, and Reverend Joseph N. Moody.

The program, produced and distributed by DuMont, aired on Sundays at 6pm ET on most DuMont affiliates. The series was cancelled in 1954.

== See also ==
- List of programs broadcast by the DuMont Television Network
- List of surviving DuMont Television Network broadcasts

== Bibliography ==
- David Weinstein, The Forgotten Network: DuMont and the Birth of American Television (Philadelphia: Temple University Press, 2004) ISBN 1-59213-245-6
- Alex McNeil, Total Television, Fourth edition (New York: Penguin Books, 1980) ISBN 0-14-024916-8
- Tim Brooks and Earle Marsh, The Complete Directory to Prime Time Network and Cable TV Shows, Ninth edition (New York: Ballantine Books, 2007) ISBN 978-0-345-49773-4
