= Public Prosecutor (TV series) =

American TV mystery series

- Genre: Crime/Panel show
- Directed by: Lew Landers
- Presented by: Warren Hull (panel-show version)
- Starring: John Howard; Anne Gwynne; Walter Sande
- Country of origin: United States
- Original language: English
- No. of seasons: 1
- No. of episodes: 26

Production
- Producer: Jerry Fairbanks
- Cinematography: Allen G. Siegler
- Camera setup: Multi-camera
- Running time: 15 (later 30) minutes
- Production company: Jerry Fairbanks Productions

Original release
- Network: NBC
- Release: February 1951 – February 28, 1952

Public Prosecutor is an American television series produced in 1947–1948, which first aired in 1951. It was the first dramatic series to be shot on film instead of being performed and broadcast live. It was originally planned to be broadcast on the NBC Television Network, but the series' 20-minute length caused the show to be problematic. It was renamed Crawford Mystery Theatre and was shown on the DuMont Television Network.

== Broadcast history ==
Public Prosecutor was the first dramatic series to be shot on film (in this case, 16 mm film to save production costs), instead of being performed and broadcast live.

John Howard starred in the title role of public prosecutor Stephen Allen, along with Anne Gwynne as his secretary Patricia Kelly and Walter Sande as his assistant Evans. Each story began with the cast members addressing the camera (representing the TV viewers) directly, welcoming them to the office and bringing them up to date on the current case. The supporting casts were familiar from theatrical B movies and serials of the day.

The format was patterned after daytime radio dramas, which ran in 15-minute installments. Jerry Fairbanks Productions filmed the pilot episode in Hollywood in 1947. After the NBC Television Network picked up the series, Fairbanks filmed 26 episodes for a planned network premiere in September 1948. The completed films ran about 17-1/2 minutes each, like MGM's theatrical Crime Does Not Pay short subjects. Producer Fairbanks, who had made shorts for theaters since the late 1930s, may have foreseen Public Prosecutor having a second life as a theatrical series; the two-reel length was ideal for movie theaters, but too long for a 15-minute TV show and too short for a half-hour show.

Public Prosecutor was pulled from the network schedule when NBC decided it preferred 30-minute episodes.

Production of the still-unseen series was suspended in October 1948 due to high costs and the lack of a national sponsor. Instead, the NBC anthology series Your Show Time became American television's first filmed dramatic series to be broadcast, in January 1949. The earliest syndicated airings of Public Prosecutor were in February 1951.

The DuMont Television Network broadcast the series as Crawford Mystery Theatre (named after sponsor Crawford Clothes) September 6–27, 1951, and continuing locally until February 28, 1952. The producers turned it into a panel show to fill out the program to 30 minutes. Each week, three guest panelists watched an episode, which was halted just before the climax. Each panelist then tried to guess the identity of the guilty party. Veteran radio announcer and future game-show host Warren Hull presided over the half-hour version of Public Prosecutor.

When Public Prosecutor was syndicated in the 1950s, the episodes had been re-edited to fit a 15-minute time slot. Film and television historian Christopher Anderson writes,

Narrated by Howard, who addresses the camera throughout much of the story, the bare-bones mystery plots are condensed to fit into fifteen-minute segments modeled after the format of radio episodes. The verbal exposition is so insistent that the images begin to seem redundant; the episodes truly resemble radio with pictures. Sets are undecorated. Actors appear distracted, if not anguished, as they try to hit their marks consistently in the first take. In spite of the opportunities for shot selection offered by the Multicam system, the camera work consists mainly of single-take medium shots or simple over-the-shoulder dialogue sequences.

== Episode status ==
One episode of Public Prosecutor is in the collection of the Museum of Broadcast Communications. Currently there are at least 10 episodes posted on YouTube. Alpha Video has released eight episodes of the series in a two-volume DVD set.

== Episodes ==
No.	Title	Directed by	Written by
1	"The Case of the Missing Bullets"	No director listed in credits	TBA
A patrolman is murdered after interrupting a burglary, and public prosecutor Allen must find the killer.
2	"The Case of the Bandaged Hand"	TBA	TBA
3	"The Case of the Mayan Dagger"	TBA	TBA
4	"The Case of the Body Beautiful"	TBA	TBA
5	"The Case of the Strange Suicide"	Lew Landers	TBA
A woman died in an auto accident, but then a suicide note is found. Allen believes the woman was murdered.
6	"The Case of the Eye Witness"	TBA	TBA
7	"The Case of the Yellow Ticket"	TBA	TBA
8	"The Case of the Family Affair"	TBA	TBA
9	"The Case of the Missing Hour"	Lew Landers	TBA
A publisher is murdered and Allen learns many people were on bad terms with the man.
10	"The Case of the Double Clue"	TBA	TBA
11	"The Case of the Swarthy Man"	TBA	TBA
12	"The Case of the Man Who Wasn’t There"	Lew Landers	TBA
The man Allen believes to be a thief always has an airtight alibi. DeForest Kelley played the man’s assistant, Danny Watson.
13	"The Case of the Talking Horseshoe"	TBA	TBA
14	"The Case of the Comic Strip Murder"	Lew Landers	TBA
15	"The Case of the Dead Man’s Voice"	Lew Landers	TBA
A murdered novelist leaves a recording in which he taunts the police, challenging them to find his killer.
16	"The Case of the Fabulous Liars"	TBA	TBA
17	"The Case of the Shattered Mirror"	Lew Landers	TBA
A bullet that missed its mark helps Allen find the murderer of a songwriter.
18	"The Case of the Surprised Corpse"	TBA	TBA
19	"The Case of the Time Stood Still"	TBA	TBA
20	"The Case of the Devil’s Heart"	Lew Landers	TBA
The young heir to a fortune is killed, perhaps in an accident. His sister, said to be mentally incompetent, keeps quoting nursery rhymes. Is she giving clues?
21	"The Case of the Glamour Girls"	Lew Landers	TBA
A neighbor and a scrubwoman are both suspects in the murder of a glamour photographer.
22	"The Case of the Crepe for Suzette"	Lew Landers	TBA
Suzette, Pat’s favorite singer, is murdered, and Suzette’s ex-husband, a fired cleaning lady, and a song plugger are suspects.
23	"The Case of the Thousand Terrors"	Lew Landers	TBA
A woman claims her family is trying to kill her. Allen suspects her husband’s first wife was murdered.
24	"The Case of the Innocent Lion"	Lew Landers	TBA
An animal trainer is mauled by a lion, but Allen learns the man died of a stab wound.
25	"The Case of the Murder Melody"	TBA	TBA
Allen questions a private detective found in the home of a murdered songwriter.
26	"The Case of the Jade Flute"	TBA	TBA

== See also ==
- List of programs broadcast by the DuMont Television Network
- List of surviving DuMont Television Network broadcasts
- 1947–48 United States network television schedule
- 1951–52 United States network television schedule

== Bibliography ==
- David Weinstein, The Forgotten Network: DuMont and the Birth of American Television (Philadelphia: Temple University Press, 2004) ISBN 1-59213-245-6
- Alex McNeil, Total Television, Fourth edition (New York: Penguin Books, 1980) ISBN 0-14-024916-8
- Tim Brooks and Earle Marsh, The Complete Directory to Prime Time Network and Cable TV Shows 1946–Present, Ninth edition (New York: Ballantine Books, 2007) ISBN 978-0-345-49773-4
