= Washington Report (TV series) =

- Presented by: Tristram Coffin (host)
- Country of origin: United States

Production
- Running time: 15 Minutes

Original release
- Network: DuMont
- Release: May 22 – August 31, 1951

Washington Report is a public affairs TV series on the now-defunct DuMont Television Network.

== Broadcast history ==
Washington Report was a 15-minute program which aired twice weekly on DuMont from May 22, 1951, to August 31, 1951. Newsman Tristram Coffin interviewed political, business, and civic leaders. This program should not be confused with Washington Exclusive, a DuMont show which aired in 1953.

== See also ==
- List of programs broadcast by the DuMont Television Network
- List of surviving DuMont Television Network broadcasts

== Bibliography ==
- David Weinstein, The Forgotten Network: DuMont and the Birth of American Television (Philadelphia: Temple University Press, 2004) ISBN 1-59213-245-6
- Alex McNeil, Total Television, Fourth edition (New York: Penguin Books, 1980) ISBN 0-14-024916-8
- Tim Brooks and Earle Marsh, The Complete Directory to Prime Time Network TV Shows, Third edition (New York: Ballantine Books, 1964) ISBN 0-345-31864-1
