= Fred Robbins (broadcaster) =

American broadcaster (1919–1992)

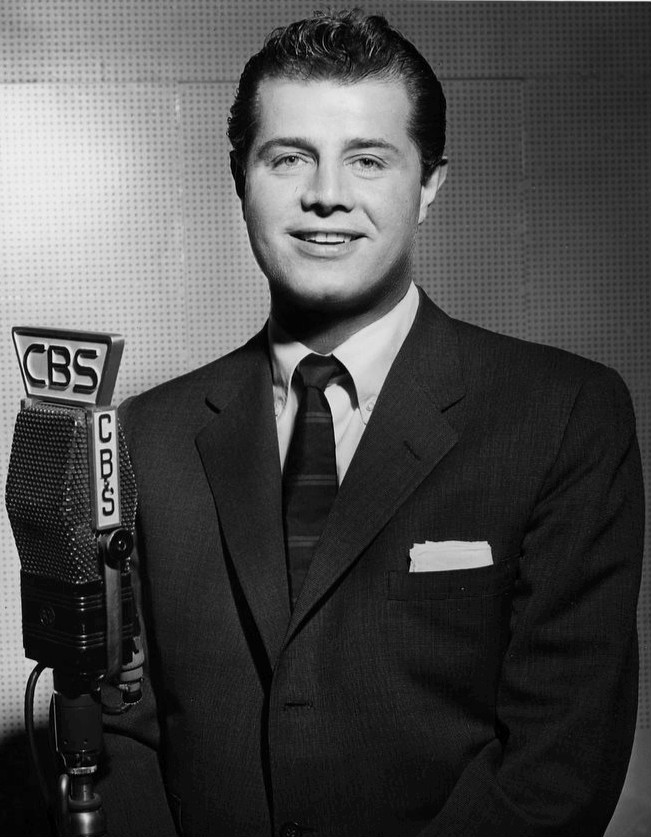
- Robbins in 1955
- Born: Fred Rubin; September 28, 1918; Baltimore, Maryland, U.S.
- Died: June 23, 1992 (aged 72); Manhattan
- Education: Baltimore City College; University of Baltimore Law School
- Occupations: Talk show host, actor, and television personality
- Spouses: Lucille Robbins Ingrid Robbins
- Children: 2

Fred Robbins (born Fred Rubin, September 28, 1919 – June 23, 1992) was an American radio personality who became a television host and celebrity interviewer.

== Background ==
Fred Robbins was born in Baltimore, Maryland, as Fred Rubin. He attended Baltimore City College and the University of Baltimore Law School, graduating in 1938. While at the University of Baltimore, Robbins was the features and radio editor of The Baloo (the official campus news weekly), and he was also a member of the tennis team and dramatic club.

== Career ==
Robbins began a career in broadcasting at Baltimore radio station WITH. He began working on WHN in New York City in 1942 and later had the 1280 Club program on WOV, also in New York City. Robbins later had the Robbins Nest program on WINS, WABC and WNEW in New York, and he hosted television programs there (including The Robbins Nest itself on WJZ-TV). He was briefly the host of The Talent Shop and Cavalcade of Bands for the DuMont TV network. He also worked on Coke Time with Eddie Fisher on NBC and was the host of Kreisler Bandstand on ABC in 1951.

Beginning in 1960, Robbins was host of Assignment Hollywood, a five-minute program on the ABC radio network. Nearly 400 affiliated stations carried the show, as did stations in Australia, Canada, and New Zealand. Robbins traveled to interview movie stars and singers on location. The trade publication Billboard reported in 1966 that radio stations considered the program "extremely useful, either as a separate show or integrated into a deejay's program".

Robbins starred or played himself in more than two dozen television shows or movies from the 1940s through the 1980s. He was also a feature interviewer for CNN's Showbiz Tonight and wrote profiles of celebrities for many magazines.

Robbins's career expanded, and he began interviewing celebrities. On October 29, 1966, he interviewed John Lennonin Carboneras, Spain, on the set of the movie How I Won the War.

Robbins also had an hour-long disc-jockey program that was syndicated via electrical transcription. In 1948 the trade publication Broadcasting noted that the show was carried by more than 100 stations.

He was immortalized by two jazz compositions, one by Billy Strayhorn called "Snibor", his name spelled backwards. It was recorded by the Duke Ellington Orchestra in 1947 and again in 1967. The other composition was "Robbins Nest" by Sir Charles Thompson and recorded by many artists'. It became a jazz standard.

Robbins died of lymphoma on June 23, 1992, at the Lenox Hill Hospital in Manhattan. He was 72 years old.

== Sources ==
- University of Baltimore. "The Reporter Yearbook 1938". Accessed November 23, 2009.
- Carter Harman, "Bop: Skee, Re or Be, ‘It's Still Got to Swing’". New York Times (December 5, 1948). Accessed October 6, 2009.
- Spangler, Jay. "Lennon Interview: Carboneras, Spain with Fred Robbins 29 October 1966."
- The Ultimate Beatles Experience. Accessed October 20, 2009.
