= Al Morgan (pianist) =

American pianist (1915–1989)

Background information
- Also known as: Flying Fingers
- Born: Albert Louis Morgan; November 14, 1915; Cincinnati, Ohio, United States
- Died: November 18, 1989 (aged 74) Maywood, Illinois, United States
- Genres: Pop, Country, Sacred
- Occupations: Singer, pianist, composer, performer, recording artist
- Years active: 1946–1989
- Labels: London, Decca, W & G, Columbia, Universal, Mercury, Phillips, Brunswick, Oriole, "X”, Coral

Al "Flying Fingers" Morgan (November 14, 1915 – November 18, 1989) was a popular nightclub singer, pianist and composer who is known for his hit recordings "Jealous Heart", "I'll Take Care Of Your Cares," and "The Place Where I Worship."

== Early life and career ==
Albert Louis Morgan was born in Cincinnati and raised in nearby Ft. Thomas, Kentucky. Morgan's musical foundation started at the Ninth Street Baptist Church in his hometown. Morgan's mother's plan was for him to be a preacher. His church sent him to Denison University on a scholarship, but Morgan soon discovered that he was "put on this earth to play and sing, not to preach." As the back cover of his religious album, The Place Where I Worship states: "…until he was twenty-one, practically all of his musical experience was in the sacred field of music."

He then studied violin and voice at the Cincinnati Conservatory and received his master's degree from Eastman School of Music in Rochester, New York. His piano playing was self-taught. Some of his first shows were as a piano sideman in the big band years playing with Glen Miller and Harry James among others. After the Pearl Harbor attack, he served as a rear gunner on B-17s in the US Army Air Force during WWII. He spent considerable time in Europe putting on shows at American installations and base hospitals. After his discharge he returned to Cincinnati. He conducted the staff band at WKRC and had several weekly radio shows. Morgan got his start in show business by playing on the boats that travel up and down the Ohio River near his home-town of Cincinnati. Morgan also bought his own night spot in Cincinnati, the Club Carasal. While working at the Club Carasal, Morgan decided that he would join the entertainment. He became so popular, he decided that he should go on the road.

== The Al Morgan Show ==
In November 1946, he gave up his radio job, sold the Club Carasal, and headed for New York. He did a long stretch at Rogers Corner Theater Lounge, a spot across the street from Madison Square Garden. Then he traveled to Chicago. He was booked in Chicago at Helsing's Vodvil Lounge at Sheridan and Montrose on the city's north side. The manager booked him, sight-unseen, thinking he was a comedian. He didn't laugh, however, when Morgan sat down at the piano and started playing. That led to The Al Morgan Show, Morgan's half-hour television show, backed by the Billy Chandler Trio, broadcasting from Helsing's. The show was on the DuMonte Television Network, from 1949 to 1951; one of the first shows to be syndicated. In 1952, Morgan was back in Cincinnati, broadcasting his show from WLW Television.

While playing in Wisconsin Morgan had the idea to make a big band arrangement of the Jenny Lou Carson song, "Jealous Heart". Rumor has it that Morgan first sang "Jealous Heart" as a part of a medley in his act. That song, recorded in Chicago and released on Universal in 1949, became a local hit. Decca Records in England was starting a new label called London Records and deal was struck to release "Jealous Heart" on London.

== Jealous Heart ==
"Jealous Heart" (a cover of the Jenny Lou Carson country song) was released in 1949 and was his biggest hit, said to have sold in excess of 12 million copies. Morgan performed at various theaters, churches, supper clubs and Las Vegas concert halls for over 40 years, and continued to perform until his death in 1989. He was one of the first musicians to have his own syndicated television show. He is best known for his flamboyant style of piano playing where he would raise his hands over his shoulders and flop them down on the keys, hitting all the correct notes, earning him the title, "Flying Fingers."

== Late career ==
Morgan continued to record for the length of his career. Morgan recorded over 50 songs for London Records and recorded for most of the major labels including Columbia, Mercury, Decca and RCA subsidiary "X". Morgan's recordings for London were pressed internationally including England, Canada, Germany, Australia and South Africa. Later in his career Morgan recorded for smaller independent labels such as Crystal, and Jewel. In 1961 he had a nightly live radio show performing from 11:30 pm to 12, on WTAQ, broadcasting from LaGrange, Illinois.

== Death ==
In 1989, Morgan performed at the Olympic Theater in Cicero, Illinois for his video, In Concert at the Olympic Theater on Memorial Day, May 28, 1989. The show ended with 3 songs all containing the word "jealous" and ending with "Jealous Heart." This could have been the medley that started his career, and the last recording that Morgan made. Morgan was performing at Noodles Restaurant when he died on Saturday, November 18, 1989 in Loyola's McGaw Hospital in Maywood, Illinois. He was survived by his wife Janice, 7 sons and a daughter Michelle.

== Personal life ==
While on tour in New York's Rogers' Corner, he met and later married the cashier. His third wife Janice was also a singer and musician who would perform with Morgan on stage. Janice recorded under her maiden name, Jan Nixon and later Jan Morgan. On her album, That's Why I Smile she sings 4 duets with her husband Al.
