= Major Dell Conway of the Flying Tigers =

- Starring: Eric Fleming; Ed Peck; Fran Lee; Luis Van Rooten; David Anderson; Joe Graham; Harry Kingston; Ben Hoffman
- Country of origin: United States

Production
- Running time: 30 minutes

Original release
- Network: DuMont
- Release: April 7, 1951 – March 2, 1952

Major Dell Conway of the Flying Tigers is an early American television program broadcast on the now defunct DuMont Television Network. The series ran from April 7, 1951, to March 2, 1952.

== Broadcast history ==
The show was an action-adventure series originally starring B-movie actor Eric Fleming as Major Dell Conway. Fleming was replaced in July 1951 by Ed Peck. Other actors included Fran Lee (as Ma Wong), Luis Van Rooten, David Anderson, Joe Graham, Harry Kingston, and Bern Hoffman as Caribou Jones. According to authors Brooks and Marsh (2007), the roles some of these actors portrayed has been lost to time.

Episode titles included "Murder in Paris", "Hostage in Havana", "Port Said", "The Sacred Jewel of Calcutta" and "Mission to Korea".

Major Dell Conway was loosely based on a true story about a pilot who flew with the Flying Tigers in World War II China. The series has been called "an extremely low-budget production".

== Production ==
The program was produced by J. Gen Genovese, who had served as a pilot during the war. The program aired on Saturday at 6:30 pm EST on most DuMont affiliates. In May 1951, the series went on hiatus, returning to the air on Sunday afternoons from July 1951 to March 1952. The final episode aired on March 2, 1952. The director was Steve Previn, and the writer was M. C. Brock. The sponsor was Powerhouse Candy.

== Episode status ==
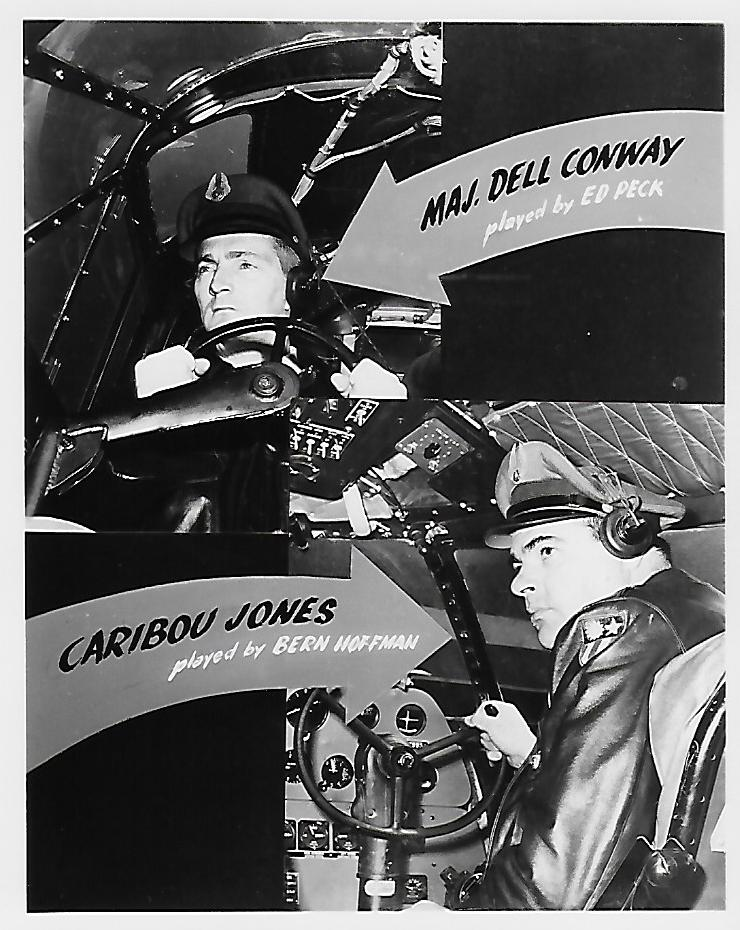
Card from Promotional Materials

UCLA Film & Television Archive holds 20 episodes of this series.

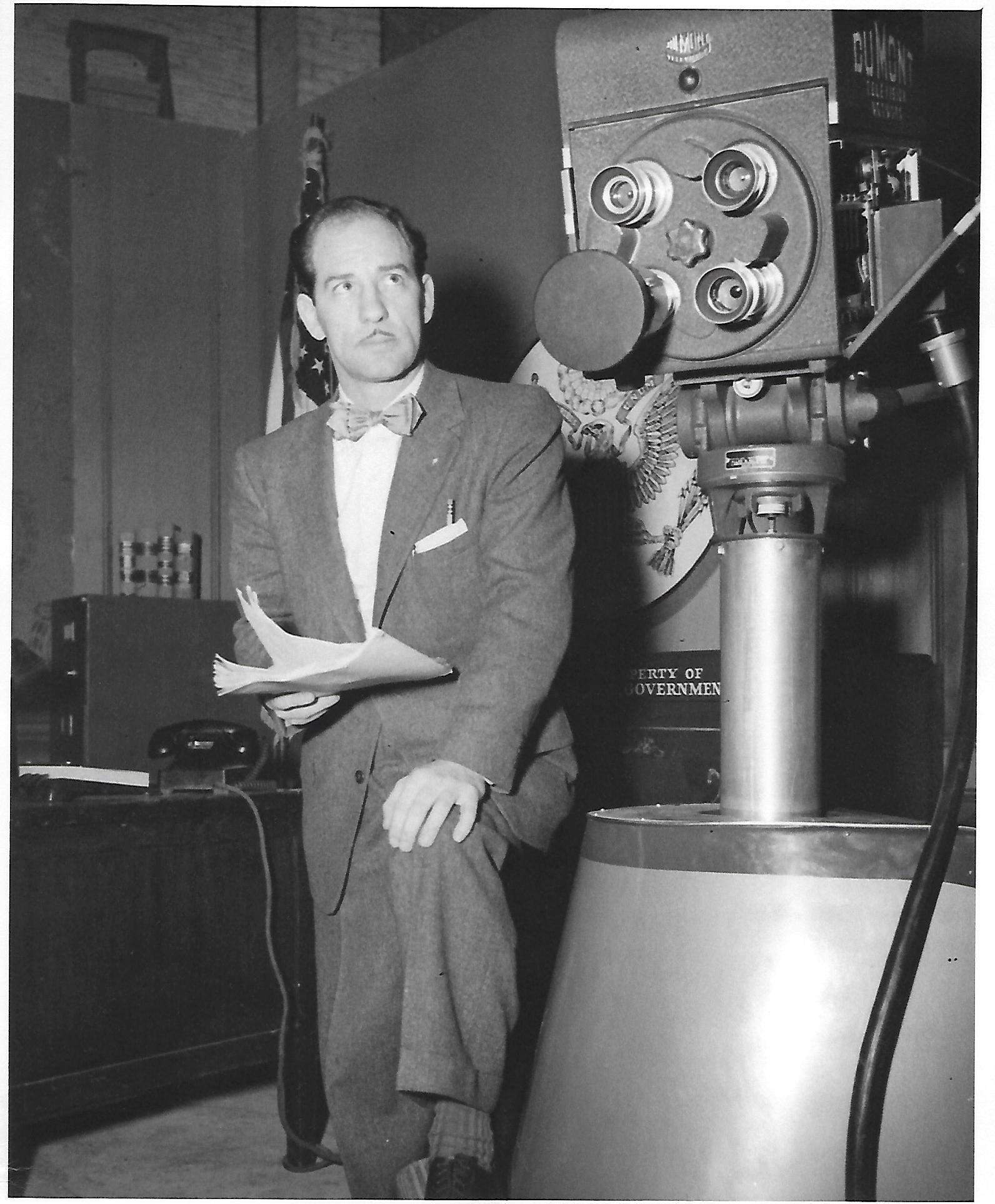
Genovese next to TV camera

== Critical response ==
A review in the trade publication Billboard said that the program "should manage to get many young televiewers to go along for the ride" despite "some of its shoddy production". It said that use of film clips in the episode reviewed added to the segment's realixm.

== See also ==
- List of programs broadcast by the DuMont Television Network
- List of surviving DuMont Television Network broadcasts

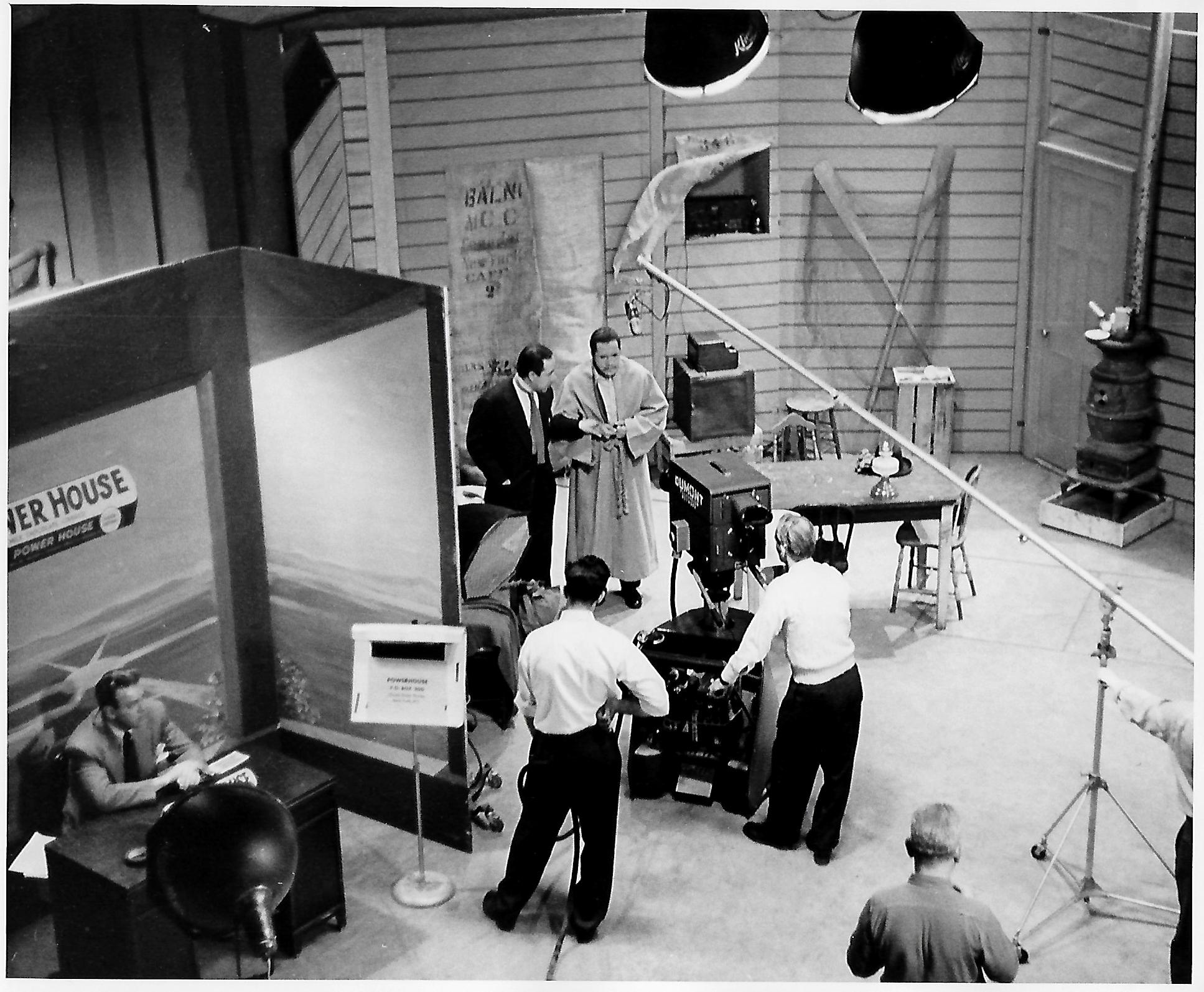
Overhead shot of set

== Bibliography ==
- David Weinstein, The Forgotten Network: DuMont and the Birth of American Television (Philadelphia: Temple University Press, 2004) ISBN 1-59213-245-6
- Alex McNeil, Total Television, Fourth edition (New York: Penguin Books, 1980) ISBN 0-14-024916-8
- Tim Brooks and Earle Marsh, The Complete Directory to Prime Time Network and Cable TV Shows 1946–Present, Ninth edition (New York: Ballantine Books, 2007) ISBN 978-0-345-49773-4
