= 1942 in television =

The year 1942 in television involved some significant events. Below is a list of television-related events during 1942.

== Events ==
- February 26 — WRGB Signs on in Albany New York.
- April 1 – The U.S. War Production Board halts the manufacture of television and radio equipment for consumer use. The ban is lifted October 1, 1945.
- April 13 – The Federal Communications Commission minimum programming time required of U.S. television stations is reduced from 15 to 4 hours a week during the war.

== Debuts ==
February 23 - Air Raid Warden’s Basic Course debuts on NBC (1942-43)

February 27 - World This Week, an early news program hosted by Linton Wells, debuts on CBS (1942)

March 6 - America At War debuts on CBS (1942)

== Television shows ==
Series	Debut	Ended	Network
Air Raid Warden’s Basic Course	February 23, 1942	November 29, 1943	NBC
World This Week	February 26, 1942	April 10, 1942	CBS
America At War	March 6, 1942	May 20, 1942	CBS
The Face of the War	1941	1945	Dumont
Thrills and Chills from Everywhere	1941	1946	Dumont

== Programs ending during 1942 ==
Date	Show	Debut
February 19, 1942	America's Town Meeting of the Air	December 19, 1941
April 10, 1942	World This Week	February 27, 1942
May 18, 1942	Boxing from Jamaica Arena	July 8, 1940
May 1942	Girl About Town with Joan Edwards	July 1, 1941
May 1942	Sports with Bob Edge	July 1, 1941
May 1942	Men At Work	July 7, 1941
May 1942	Stars of Tomorrow	July 16, 1941
May 1942	Songs by Harvey Harding	July 18, 1941
May 1942	Radio City Matinee	September 4, 1941
May 12, 1942	The Adam Hats Sports Parade: Wrestling at Ridgewood Grove	October 21, 1941
May 20, 1942	America At War	March 6, 1942
January 19, 1942	War Backgrounds	December 22, 1941

== Births ==
- January 3 – John Thaw, English actor (Inspector Morse) (died 2002)
- January 5 – Charlie Rose, journalist
- January 8
  - Yvette Mimieux, actress (died 2022)
  - Stephen Hawking, scientist (died 2018)
- January 10 – Walter Hill, director
- January 11 – Joel Zwick, director
- January 17 – Muhammad Ali, boxer (died 2016)
- January 21 – Edwin Starr, singer (died 2003)
- January 23 - Brian Croucher, actor
- January 27 - John Witherspoon, actor and comedian (Wayans Brothers) (died 2019)
- January 30 - Heidi Brühl, actress (died 1991)
- February 1
  - Terry Jones, Welsh comedic actor and writer (Monty Python's Flying Circus) (died 2020)
  - Bibi Besch, actress (died 1996)
- February 12 – George Schenck, screenwriter (died 2024)
- February 13 – Peter Tork, musician and actor (The Monkees) (died 2019)
- February 14 – Michael Bloomberg, namesake of Bloomberg TV
- February 16 – Patricia Maynard, actress
- February 17 – Dieter Laser, actor (died 2020)
- February 22 – Geoffrey Scott, actor (Dynasty) (died 2021)
- February 23 – Joop van den Ende, Dutch theatrical producer
- February 24 – Joe Lieberman, American politician (died 2024)
- February 25 – Karen Grassle, actress (Little House on the Prairie)
- February 28 – Frank Bonner, actor and director (WKRP in Cincinnati) (died 2021)
- March 3 – David Jacobs, gymnast
- March 4 – Lynn Sherr, broadcast journalist
- March 6 – Ben Murphy, actor (Alias Smith and Jones)
- March 14 – Nickolas Davatzes, television executive (died 2021)
- March 15 – The Iron Sheik, pro wrestler (died 2023)
- March 25 – Aretha Franklin, singer (died 2018)
- March 29 – Scott Wilson, American actor (died 2018)
- March 31 – Michael Savage, American host
- April 3
  - Marsha Mason, actress and director
  - Wayne Newton, actor and singer
- April 7 – Gabrielle Beaumont, director (died 2022)
- April 17 – David Bradley, actor
- April 23
  - Sandra Dee, actress (died 2005)
  - Sheila Gish, actress (died 2005)
- April 24 – Barbra Streisand, singer
- April 26 – Bobby Rydell, singer (died 2022)
- May 1 – Thomas Del Ruth, American cinematographer
- May 3 – Dave Marash, American television journalist
- May 5 – Marc Alaimo, American television actor
- May 6 – David Friesen, American jazz bassist
- May 12 – Marya Carter, actress
- May 20
  - David Proval, actor (The Sopranos)
  - Nancy Fleming, American beauty pageant titleholder
- May 22 – Barbara Parkins, actress (Peyton Place)
- May 23 – Alex Henteloff, actor (Barney Miller)
- May 27 – Sue Simmons, retired news anchor
- May 29 – Kevin Conway, actor (died 2020)
- June 16 – Suzan Farmer, actress (died 2017)
- June 18
  - Paul McCartney, English singer-songwriter (The Beatles)
  - Nick Tate, Australian actor (Space: 1999)
  - Roger Ebert, American film critic, film historian, journalist, screenwriter, and author (died 2013)
- June 19 – Ned Schmidtke, actor
- June 24 – Michele Lee, actress, dancer and singer (Knots Landing)
- July 6 – Judith Barcroft, actress (Another World)
- July 7 – Chris Stamp, British music producer (died 2012)
- July 9 – Richard Roundtree, actor (died 2023)
- July 13 – Harrison Ford, actor
- July 22 – Toyohiro Akiyama, TV journalist
- July 23 – Madeline Bell, singer
- July 29 – Tony Sirico, actor (The Sopranos) (died 2022)
- August 7 – Tobin Bell, actor
- August 9 – David Steinberg, actor
- August 18 – Judith Keppel, quiz show contestant
- August 20 – Isaac Hayes, singer and actor (South Park) (died 2008)
- August 25 – Ivan Koloff, professional wrestler (died 2017)
- August 28 – Peter Bartlett, actor (One Life to Live)
- September 2 – Robert Shapiro, lawyer
- September 6 – Carol Wayne, actress (died 1985)
- September 17 – Lupe Ontiveros, actress (died 2012)
- September 20 – William F. Baker, broadcaster
- September 21 – Tracy Reed, actress (died 2012)
- September 23 – Carol Ann Abrams, American television and film producer (died 2012)
- September 26 – Kent McCord, actor (Adam-12)
- September 29
  - Ian McShane, English actor (Lovejoy, Deadwood)
  - Donna Corcoran, actress
- October 3 – Alan Rachins, actor (L.A. Law, Dharma & Greg)
- October 6 – Britt Ekland, Swedish actress
- October 7 – Joy Behar, American comedian
- October 12 – Petronella Barker, actress
- October 14
  - Cyrus Yavneh, producer (died 2018)
  - Jim Hougan, producer
- October 17 – Kelly Monteith, actor (died 2023)
- October 20 – Earl Hindman, actor (Home Improvement) (died 2003)
- October 21 – Judy Sheindlin, television personality, television producer, and author, and a former prosecutor and Manhattan family court judge
- October 22 – Annette Funicello, actress and singer (The Mickey Mouse Club) (died 2013)
- October 23 – Michael Crichton, author and filmmaker (died 2008)
- October 29 – Bob Ross, television host (died 1995)
- October 31 – David Ogden Stiers, actor (M*A*S*H) (died 2018)
- November 1 – Marcia Wallace, actress and comedian (The Bob Newhart Show, The Simpsons) (died 2013)
- November 2 – Stefanie Powers, actress (Hart to Hart)
- November 9 – Tom Weiskopf, golfer (died 2022)
- November 17 – Martin Scorsese, actor
- November 18
  - Linda Evans, actress (The Big Valley, Dynasty)
  - Susan Sullivan, actress (Falcon Crest)
- November 19 – Calvin Klein, fashion designer
- November 20
  - Bob Einstein, actor (died 2019)
  - Joe Biden, politician (guest star on Parks and Recreation)
- November 22 – Dick Stockton, American retired sportscaster
- November 24 – Billy Connolly, actor
- November 29 – John Grillo, actor
- December 4
  - Gemma Jones, actress
  - Al Hunt, reporter
- December 6 – Chelsea Brown, actress (died 2017)
- December 7 – Peter Tomarken, game show host (Press Your Luck) (died 2006)
- December 9 – Dick Butkus, actor (died 2023)
- December 14 – Jack Cafferty, former CNN commentator
- December 23 – Brian McConnachie, actor (died 2024)
- December 27 – Charmian Carr, actress (died 2016)
- December 30
  - Michael Nesmith, musician and actor (The Monkees) (died 2021)
  - Fred Weinberg, composer
  - Betty Aberlin, actress

== Deaths ==
- October – Bernard Natan, owner of Pathé and co-founder of France's first television company, Télévision-Baird-Natan, 56
