= The Al Morgan Show =

American TV variety series (1949–1951)

- Genre: Variety
- Presented by: Al Morgan
- Country of origin: United States
- Original language: English
- No. of seasons: 2

Production
- Producer: Don Cook
- Camera setup: Multi-camera
- Running time: 25 minutes

Original release
- Network: DuMont
- Release: September 2, 1949 – August 9, 1951

The Al Morgan Show is an American variety program broadcast on the DuMont Television Network from September 5, 1949, to 1951. The series starred pianist and songwriter Al Morgan. It was popular as a local show in Chicago before it went on the network.

== Format ==
Morgan performed for most of the program, which also featured Billy Chandler's orchestra. Guests occasionally appeared.

== Broadcast ==
Unlike most DuMont offerings which were broadcast from the network's studios in New York City, the series was broadcast from WGN-TV in Chicago. The show aired Mondays at 8:30 p.m. Eastern Time.

Don Cook was the director.

== See also ==
- List of programs broadcast by the DuMont Television Network
- List of surviving DuMont Television Network broadcasts
- 1949-50 United States network television schedule
- 1950-51 United States network television schedule

== Bibliography ==
- David Weinstein, 'The Forgotten Network: DuMont and the Birth of American Television' (Philadelphia: Temple University Press, 2004) ISBN 1-59213-245-6
