= WFTV (Minnesota) =

Television station in Duluth, Minnesota (1953–1954)

Duluth, Minnesota; United States
- Channels: Analog: 38 (UHF)

Programming
- Affiliations: CBS, NBC, ABC, and DuMont (1953–1954)

Ownership
- Owner: Great Plains Television Properties of Minnesota Inc.

History
- First air date: June 7, 1953
- Last air date: July 11, 1954

WFTV (channel 38) was the first television station in Duluth, Minnesota, United States.

== History ==
The station began test broadcasts on May 28, 1953, and began regular programming on June 7, carrying programming from all four TV networks of the time, ABC, CBS, NBC, and DuMont. It shared office space with WEBC radio and transmitted from the former WEBC-FM tower on Duluth's Observation Hill.

WFTV faced challenges from the beginning, being a UHF station in an era when most television sets only included VHF tuners; set manufacturers were not required to include UHF tuning until 1964. Most Northland residents needed a converter to watch WFTV, and the picture quality left much to be desired even with one. Additionally, the Duluth market is a very large market geographically, and UHF stations do not carry well across large areas. As a result, the station never thrived.

In March 1954, VHF stations WDSM-TV and KDAL-TV—both co-owned with other radio stations in the market—signed on and took the NBC and CBS affiliations. This left WFTV with ABC and DuMont. Saddled with affiliations with the two weakest and smallest networks, as well as a weak signal, WFTV could not compete and left the air on July 11, 1954.

Duluth would be a two-station market until WDIO-TV signed on in 1966. The market would not get another major UHF station until 1999 when KQDS-TV upgraded and affiliated with the Fox network.

The bottom portion of the tower used by WEBC-FM and WFTV still stands, and is used today for telecommunications. Channel 38 was originally used for WDSE's digital signal, but went empty again in 2009 when WDSE moved digital operations to channel 8.

The WFTV callsign was later adopted by the ABC affiliate on Channel 9 in Orlando, Florida, which was previously WLOF-TV, in 1963.
