= Washington Exclusive =

- Created by: Martha Roundtree; Lawrence Spivak
- Presented by: Frank McNaughton
- Country of origin: United States

Production
- Producers: Martha Roundtree; Lawrence Spivak
- Running time: 30 minutes

Original release
- Network: DuMont
- Release: June 21 – November 1, 1953

Washington Exclusive is an American news and public affairs television program broadcast on the DuMont Television Network and produced by Martha Roundtree and Lawrence Spivak, who also co-produced Meet the Press.

== Broadcast history ==
The series ran nationally from June 21 to November 1, 1953, and was hosted by Frank McNaughton. The show aired Sunday nights at 7:30 pm ET. Six former U.S. senators appeared on the panel, discussing current issues. The series was cancelled in November 1953.

This series is not to be confused with the similarly named Washington Report, another DuMont public-affairs program from Washington which aired from May to August 1951.

== Episode status ==
As with most DuMont series, no episodes are known to exist.

== See also ==
- List of programs broadcast by the DuMont Television Network
- List of surviving DuMont Television Network broadcasts

== Bibliography ==
- David Weinstein, The Forgotten Network: DuMont and the Birth of American Television (Philadelphia: Temple University Press, 2004) ISBN 1-59213-245-6
- Alex McNeil, Total Television, Fourth edition (New York: Penguin Books, 1980) ISBN 0-14-024916-8
- Tim Brooks and Earle Marsh, The Complete Directory to Prime Time Network TV Shows, Third edition (New York: Ballantine Books, 1964) ISBN 0-345-31864-1
