= Summer Night Theater =

- Country of origin: United States

Production
- Running time: 30 minutes

Original release
- Network: DuMont Television Network
- Release: July 7 – July 28, 1953

Summer Night Theater is a weekly television series broadcast on DuMont beginning July 7, 1953, and ending July 28, 1953.

== Synopsis ==
This 30-minute series featured filmed dramas with Lloyd Bridges and Gale Storm among the stars. It was broadcast at 10 p.m. Eastern Time. After its four-week run on DuMont, it was broadcast in New York through the rest of summer 1953.

== See also ==
- List of programs broadcast by the DuMont Television Network
- List of surviving DuMont Television Network broadcasts
- 1948-49 United States network television schedule

== Bibliography ==
- David Weinstein, The Forgotten Network: DuMont and the Birth of American Television (Philadelphia: Temple University Press, 2004) ISBN 1-59213-245-6
- Alex McNeil, Total Television, Fourth edition (New York: Penguin Books, 1980) ISBN 0-14-024916-8
- Tim Brooks and Earle Marsh, The Complete Directory to Prime Time Network TV Shows, Third edition (New York: Ballantine Books, 1964) ISBN 0-345-31864-1
