= The Roy Doty Show =

- Genre: Children
- Presented by: Roy Doty
- Country of origin: United States
- Original language: English
- No. of seasons: 1
- No. of episodes: 22

Production
- Running time: 30 minutes

Original release
- Network: DuMont
- Release: May 10 – October 4, 1953

The Roy Doty Show is a Sunday morning DuMont Television Network children's television show hosted by cartoonist Roy Doty, which aired from May 10, 1953, to October 4, 1953. The program featured Doty drawing cartoons and sketches and telling children's stories.

== Episode status ==
As with many DuMont series, no copies of the episodes are known to exist.

== See also ==
- List of programs broadcast by the DuMont Television Network
- List of surviving DuMont Television Network broadcasts
- Daytime television in the United States

== Bibliography ==
- David Weinstein, The Forgotten Network: DuMont and the Birth of American Television (Philadelphia: Temple University Press, 2004) ISBN 1-59213-245-6
- Alex McNeil, Total Television, Fourth edition (New York: Penguin Books, 1980) ISBN 0-14-024916-8
- Tim Brooks and Earle Marsh, The Complete Directory to Prime Time Network TV Shows, Third edition (New York: Ballantine Books, 1964) ISBN 0-345-31864-1
