= Not for Publication (TV series) =

- Genre: Drama
- Starring: William Adler; Maurice Burke; Mary Beth Hughes; Jerome Cowan; Herbert Nelson; Hal Ross; Robert Shackleton
- Country of origin: United States
- Original language: English

Production
- Producers: Barry Shear; Charles J. Parson
- Running time: 15 min. (Apr-Aug 1951); 30 min. (Dec 1951-May 1952)

Original release
- Network: DuMont
- Release: April 29, 1951 – May 27, 1952

Not for Publication is an American crime drama TV series which aired on the now-defunct DuMont Television Network from April 1951 to May 1952. The series was also known as Reporter Collins.

== Broadcast history ==
The show aired for 15 minutes from April 27, 1951, to August 27, 1951, and then brought back as a 30-minute show on December 21, 1951. The final show aired on May 27, 1952. The series focuses on Collins, a reporter at the fictional New York Ledger. William Adler played Collins in the 15-minute version and Jerome Cowan played Collins in the 30-minute version. Jon Silo portrayed Luchek.

Cowan said that he felt "right at home" in "giving a true-to-life picture" of reporters in contrast to other depictions that had reporters solving crimes that baffled police.

== Critical reception ==
A review of the May 8, 1958, episode in the trade publication Billboard complimented several aspects of the episode. Leon Morse described Not for Publication as "a property of considerable promise" — one with "a natural human interest slant which should be productive of a televiewing audience". The review described the direction and camera work as "outstanding" and praised the performances of Henry Barnard and Sally Gracie in their roles. The only negative aspect mentioned was the sound heard during a telephone conversation.

== Production ==
Roger Gerry was the producer, and Dick Sandwick was the director. The first version of the program was broadcast from 7:45 to 8 p.m. Eastern Time on Mondays and Thursdays. The second version initially ran from 8:30 to 9 p.m. ET on Fridays. In March 1952, it moved to 10-10:30 p.m. ET on Tuesdays.

== Episode status ==
12 episodes are held by the UCLA Film & Television Archive, while 4 are held in the J. Fred MacDonald section of the Library of Congress. The status of the others is unknown, though they are presumed lost.

== See also ==
- List of programs broadcast by the DuMont Television Network
- List of surviving DuMont Television Network broadcasts

== Bibliography ==
- David Weinstein, The Forgotten Network: DuMont and the Birth of American Television (Philadelphia: Temple University Press, 2004) ISBN 1-59213-245-6
