= The Victor Borge Show =

American variety television program

The Victor Borge Show is a 30-minute American variety television program that was broadcast live on NBC from February 3, 1951, to June 30, 1951. It was sponsored by Kellogg.

== Premise ==
The program starred Victor Borge, an "internationally known pianist and comic interpreter of music". Episodes usually included Borge's playing both a straight concert piece and a humorous interpretation. The Phil Engalls Orchestra provided musical support. Episodes also included guest stars who performed and chatted with Borge.

Perry Lafferty was the director, with Borge, Eddie Lawrence, and Max Wilk as writers. The program was a mid-season replacement for the Hank McCune Show. Its network competitors were Hollywood Theatre Time on ABC and The Sam Levenson Show on CBS. It was replaced by Tom Corbett, Space Cadet.

A review in the trade publication Billboard said: "This is not a program which produces multitudes of belly laughs. But it is filled with sly good humor and clever satire."

== Problems ==
Borge "was better in guest spots than having his own show." Lafferty said years later that trying to convert Borge's talented, but specialized, skills into a TV program "was the hardest thing in my career." Lawrence and Wilk managed to create new routines each week even though, as Lafferty said, "Borge fought everything we tried to do." One of the skits had Borge encountering difficulty trying to play a song, but other people walked in and played it perfectly.

== Radio ==
Borge's television series was preceded by The Victor Borge Show on radio. Four versions of the program were broadcast on network radio.

The Victor Borge Show on Radio
Starting Date	Ending Date	Length	Network	Sponsor	Orchestra
March 8, 1943	July 9, 1943	15 minutes	Blue		
July 3, 1945	September 25, 1945	30 minutes	NBC	Johnson's Wax	Billy Mills Orchestra
September 9, 1946	June 30, 1947	30 minutes	NBC	Socony Oil	Benny Goodman Orchestra
January 1, 1951	June 1, 1951	5 minutes	Mutual	Kellogg	
October 1, 1951	December 28, 1951	5 minutes	ABC	Kellogg	

Source: On the Air: The Encyclopedia of Old-Time Radio
