= Time for Reflection =

- Presented by: David Ross
- Country of origin: United States
- Original language: English

Production
- Running time: 10–15 minutes

Original release
- Network: DuMont
- Release: June 27, 1949 – January 19, 1951

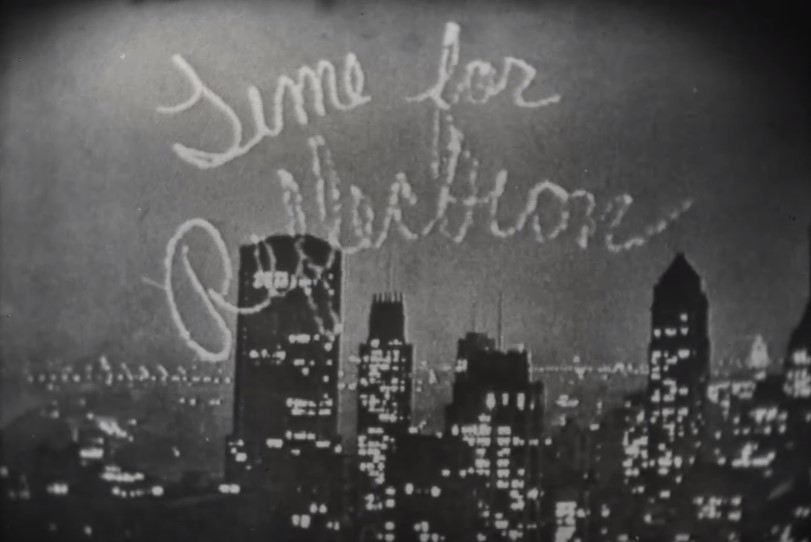
Title from the show

Time for Reflection is an early American television program that aired on the DuMont Television Network. Newspapers from the time show that it began airing on June 27, 1949, as a daily 5-minute program, Monday through Friday, from 5:25 pm to 5:30 pm. It appears to have finished its run on January 19, 1951. By the time the program finished its run, it was airing as a 10-minute program, 5:15 pm to 5:25 pm.

An additional source also lists it as running as a 15-minute Sunday night (6:45 to 7:00 p.m.) program of poetry and inspirational prose, read by host David Ross (1891–1975) and lasting from May 7, 1950 to October 22, 1950 in that timeslot.

At least one kinescope from December 1950 is known to exist at UCLA, and is narrated by Fred Scott, long-time DuMont announcer who played Communications Officer Rogers on Captain Video.

== See also ==
- List of programs broadcast by the DuMont Television Network
- List of surviving DuMont Television Network broadcasts
- 1950–51 United States network television schedule

== Bibliography ==
- Tim Brooks and Earle Marsh, The Complete Directory to Prime Time Network and Cable TV Shows 1946–Present, Ninth edition (New York: Ballantine Books, 2007) ISBN 978-0-345-49773-4
