= Photographic Horizons =

- Country of origin: United States

Production
- Running time: 30 minutes

Original release
- Network: DuMont
- Release: January 12 – March 7, 1949

Photographic Horizons is a United States television series where panelists discussed the art and science of photography. The show aired on Wednesdays at 8:30pm on the now-defunct DuMont Television Network.

== Episode status ==
A single kinescope recording of this series survives at the Paley Center for Media, dating from August 25, 1948, when the show was still on a local DuMont station. This in fact is one of the oldest surviving records of a live television program and runs a total of 55 minutes, and may represent two episodes.

== See also ==
- List of programs broadcast by the DuMont Television Network
- List of surviving DuMont Television Network broadcasts
- 1948-49 United States network television schedule

== Bibliography ==
- David Weinstein, The Forgotten Network: DuMont and the Birth of American Television (Philadelphia: Temple University Press, 2004) ISBN 1-59213-245-6
- Alex McNeil, Total Television, Fourth edition (New York: Penguin Books, 1980) ISBN 0-14-024916-8
- Tim Brooks and Earle Marsh, The Complete Directory to Prime Time Network TV Shows, Third edition (New York: Ballantine Books, 1964) ISBN 0-345-31864-1
