= Jacqueline Susann's Open Door =

- Starring: Jacqueline Susann
- Country of origin: United States
- Original language: English

Production
- Executive producer: George Scheck

Original release
- Network: DuMont Television Network
- Release: May 7 – June 29, 1951

Jacqueline Susann's Open Door is an American discussion show hosted by Jacqueline Susann, later to become famous as the author of Valley of the Dolls. It aired nationally on the DuMont Television Network between May 7 and June 18, 1951.

== Overview ==
Each week Susann interviewed celebrities and people who sought jobs.

Sam Chase's review of the program in the June 2, 1951, issue of Billboard illustrated the significance of the program's title:

"Purpose of the show is to try to open the door to a job for people with capabilities who have had difficulties getting themselves located. ... Two of her [Susann's] guests, for instance, were a gal in a wheelchair who desired a steno post and a spry 84-year-old gal who'd been a receptionist. ... Third door-opening was sought for a lad who wanted a production job with a newspaper, ad agency or magazine because his gal was getting tired of waiting for him."

Chase also noted the roles of celebrities who were interviewed: "Regular feature on the show will be appearance of a guest celeb who will tell how tough it was to get doors open for himself once."

George Scheck was the producer. Beatrice Cole was the writer.

== Critical response ==
Walter Winchell wrote in his syndicated newspaper column published May 30, 1951, "Jacqueline Susann's Open Door (via WABD) is human-interest at its heart-tuggiest."

== Episode status ==
No episodes are known to exist today.

== See also ==
- List of programs broadcast by the DuMont Television Network
- List of surviving DuMont Television Network broadcasts

== Bibliography ==
- David Weinstein, The Forgotten Network: DuMont and the Birth of American Television (Philadelphia: Temple University Press, 2004) ISBN 1-59213-245-6
- Alex McNeil, Total Television, Fourth edition (New York: Penguin Books, 1980) ISBN 0-14-024916-8
- Tim Brooks and Earle Marsh, The Complete Directory to Prime Time Network TV Shows, Third edition (New York: Ballantine Books, 1964) ISBN 0-345-31864-1
