= Frank McNaughton =

American journalist

Frank Naughton
- Born: 1906
- Died: October 30, 1978 (aged 71–72); Evanston, Illinois
- Occupation: Journalist
- Writing career
- Language: English
- Years active: 1930s-1960s
- Notable work: Books on Harry S. Truman

Frank McNaughton (c. 1906 – 1978) was a 20th-century American newspaper journalist, best known for as Congressional affairs correspondent in Washington, D.C., for Time magazine.

== Career ==
Around 1935, McNaughton joined United Press news agency.

During the 1940s, McNaughton joined Time magazine as their Washington correspondent on Congressional affairs. He wrote nearly forty cover stories. In March and April 1946, he toured American military bases in the Pacific Ocean to report on the mishandling of surplus from World War II. On July 26, 1946, he wrote in an internal memo that stated "Harry Truman could not carry Missouri now."

In 1950 while still with Time, McNaughton joined NBC television's Meet the Press. On August 27, 1950, he helped interview Mike Quill, co-founder and long-time president of the Transport Workers Union of America and asked him regarding union leader Harry Bridges, "Do you think he ought to be deported [from the United States]" and also "Do you believe he's a Communist?" (Quill answered, "I don't believe so" and "I don't know.")

In 1953, McNaughton and former colleague John Scott joined a speaking team for Time magazine's Education Department, a special program that targeted U.S. college students.

In 1957, McNaughton moved to Chicago, where he ran McNaughton & Associates, a public relations firm that specialized in political campaigns. His clients included U.S. Senator Paul Douglas of Illinois, whom he supported as speechwriter and publicist.

== Hiss case ==
On August 3, 1948, McNaughton escorted colleague Whittaker Chambers, senior editor of Time, to his first-ever hearing before the House Un-American Activities Committee (HUAC). The night before, Chambers stayed at McNaughton's home. McNaughton also warned Chambers about a HUAC member "who asks shrewd questions": freshman congressman Richard Nixon.

== Works ==
- This Man Truman with Walter Hehmeyer (1945)
- Harry Truman – President with Walter Hehmeyer (1948)
- Mennen Williams of Michigan: Fighter for Progress (1960)

== Legacy ==
McNaughton's papers reside at the Truman Presidential Library in Independence, Missouri. The majority consists of raw material for his Time stories.

== See also ==
- Time magazine
- Harry S. Truman
- Whittaker Chambers
