= Drama at Eight =

American TV dramatic anthology series (1953)

- Country of origin: United States

Production
- Running time: 30 minutes

Original release
- Network: DuMont
- Release: July 9 – July 30, 1953

Drama at Eight is an American dramatic anthology television program that was broadcast on the DuMont Television Network from July 9, 1953, through July 30, 1953. The series aired on Thursday nights from 8 to 8:30 PM Eastern Time. Additional episodes continued to air locally in New York through October 1, 1953.

Cliff Arquette appeared as Charley Weaver in the July 30, 1953, episode.

== See also ==
- List of programs broadcast by the DuMont Television Network
- List of surviving DuMont Television Network broadcasts

== Bibliography ==
- David Weinstein, The Forgotten Network: DuMont and the Birth of American Television (Philadelphia: Temple University Press, 2004) ISBN 1-59213-245-6
- Alex McNeil, Total Television, Fourth edition (New York: Penguin Books, 1980) ISBN 0-14-024916-8
