= They're Off (game show) =

- Genre: Game show
- Country of origin: United States
- Original language: English
- No. of episodes: 7

Production
- Running time: 30 minutes

Original release
- Network: DuMont
- Release: July 7 – August 18, 1949

They're Off is a game show broadcast on the DuMont Television Network from July 7 to August 18, 1949.

== Premise ==
The 30-minute show used films of historic horse races as a basis for questions posed to contestants. Tom Shirley was the host, and Byron Field called the races.

== See also ==
- List of programs broadcast by the DuMont Television Network
- List of surviving DuMont Television Network broadcasts

== Bibliography ==
- David Weinstein, The Forgotten Network: DuMont and the Birth of American Television (Philadelphia: Temple University Press, 2004) ISBN 1-59213-245-6
