= International Playhouse =

- Country of origin: United States

Production
- Running time: 90 mins.

Original release
- Network: DuMont
- Release: May 30 – November 14, 1951

International Playhouse is an American television series that was broadcast on the now-defunct DuMont Television Network during 1951.

== Broadcast history ==
International Playhouse is a Monday night filmed series, but the exact dates of broadcast are unclear. Brooks and Marsh (2007) state the program aired from April to May 1951. McNeil (1996) and the Clarke Ingram historic website on DuMont both give the broadcast dates as May 30, 1951, to November 14, 1951. Little information about the series has been preserved. McNeil states the content consisted of "short foreign films and other foreign-made dramatic stories". A TV listing from December 10, 1952, suggests the series continued locally on New York's WABD (now WNYW) after the network run ended; in the listing the show is listed at 10:00PM, with the guide to films on TV for that day suggesting the presentation consisted of 1934 British film Freedom of the Seas.

== Episode status ==
The UCLA Film and Television Archive lists 12 episodes in their collection, some of which are incomplete.

== See also ==
- List of programs broadcast by the DuMont Television Network
- List of surviving DuMont Television Network broadcasts

== Bibliography ==
- David Weinstein, The Forgotten Network: DuMont and the Birth of American Television (Philadelphia: Temple University Press, 2004) ISBN 1-59213-245-6
- Alex McNeil, Total Television, Fourth edition (New York: Penguin Books, 1980) ISBN 0-14-024916-8
- Tim Brooks and Earle Marsh, The Complete Directory to Prime Time Network and Cable TV Shows 1946–Present, Ninth edition (New York: Ballantine Books, 2007) ISBN 978-0-345-49773-4
