= Swing Into Sports =

- Country of origin: United States

Production
- Running time: 30 minutes

Original release
- Network: DuMont
- Release: November 1947 – 1949

Swing Into Sports is an American television series which ran Sundays at 8pm ET from 1947 to circa mid-1949.

== Production background ==
The series aired on New York City television station WABD, which at the time was the flagship station for the DuMont Television Network. The series is notable not just as an early example of sports-themed television programming, but for having a surviving episode from 1948 (see below).

Colonial Airlines began sponsoring Swing Into Sports on November 29, 1948. The series featured Joan Arliss (per Paley Center for Media) or Joan Kerwin (per Billboard magazine) and Chuck Tranum. Tranum is also known for having hosted Manhattan Spotlight.

Billboard magazine (see below) listed the sponsor as Transmirra Image Definer (misprinted as Transmirra Imgea Refiner), and the producer as Bob Loewi.

== Reception ==
The 22 November 1947 edition of Billboard gave the series a mixed review. A writer for the magazine said "As a low-budget live production, the concept behind the show is a fresh one which should provide interesting and relaxing diversion for home viewers - the kind of program badly needed by video. Execution, however, falls somewhat short of concept, altho it has improved considerably in recent weeks".

== Episode status ==
A single episode of this series is held by the Paley Center for Media, listed as having aired August 29, 1948.

== See also ==
- List of programs broadcast by the DuMont Television Network
- List of surviving DuMont Television Network broadcasts

== Bibliography ==
- David Weinstein, The Forgotten Network: DuMont and the Birth of American Television (Philadelphia: Temple University Press, 2004) ISBN 1-59213-245-6
- Alex McNeil, Total Television, Fourth edition (New York: Penguin Books, 1980) ISBN 0-14-024916-8
- Tim Brooks and Earle Marsh, The Complete Directory to Prime Time Network TV Shows, Third edition (New York: Ballantine Books, 1964) ISBN 0-345-31864-1
