= Once Upon a Tune =

American TV musical anthology series (1951)

- Genre: Music/Variety
- Written by: Sid Frank
- Directed by: Barnaby Smith
- Starring: Bea Arthur; Reginald Beane; Charlotte Rae; Gordon Dilworth; Phil Hanna; Holly Harris
- Composer: Coleman Dowell
- Country of origin: United States
- Original language: English

Production
- Producer: Bob Loewi
- Running time: 30 minutes

Original release
- Network: DuMont
- Release: March 6 – May 15, 1951

Once Upon a Tune is a weekly half-hour American musical anthology television series that aired on the DuMont Television Network, premiering on March 6, 1951, and running to May 15, 1951.

== Overview ==
Once Upon a Tune began as a local program in New York before it was shown on the network. The series presented original musical productions which were often satirical and tongue-in-cheek adaptations of either classic fairy tales or contemporary Broadway musicals. Bea Arthur made her TV debut on this series. Regulars on the series were Reginald Beane, Phil Hanna, Holly Harris, Ed Holmes, and Bernice Parks.

== Episode status ==
The Paley Center for Media holds kinescope copies of three episodes – one spoofing "Three Little Pigs", one spoofing "Rapunzel", and the third on a 57-minute kinescope film reel. (This latter reel also contains an episode of Mr. Dynamite, a TV series or pilot based on an earlier Hollywood movie of the same name based on a Dashiell Hammett story.)

According to Edie Adams, an actress who worked at DuMont for several years, much of the network's programming archive was destroyed in the 1970s.

== Production ==
The producer was Bob Loewi, and the writer was Sid Frank. The program was broadcast on Tuesdays from 10 to 11 p.m. Eastern Time.

== See also ==
- List of programs broadcast by the DuMont Television Network
- List of surviving DuMont Television Network broadcasts

== Bibliography ==
- David Weinstein, The Forgotten Network: DuMont and the Birth of American Television (Philadelphia: Temple University Press, 2004) ISBN 1-59213-245-6
