= Ladies Before Gentlemen =

- Starring: Ken Roberts
- Country of origin: United States

Production
- Producer: Henry Misrock
- Running time: 30 minutes

Original release
- Network: DuMont
- Release: February 28 – May 2, 1951

Ladies Before Gentlemen is an American television series that aired on the DuMont Television Network from February 28 to May 2, 1951. It was a panel show which featured discussions of male and female perspectives on a variety of topics. Moderated by Ken Roberts, the program aired from February 28 to May 2, 1951. The series was produced by Henry Misrock.

== Format ==
The program's game show structure pitted a female guest against a six-man panel, with the guest defending the woman's point of view on a topical issue. Panelists included Harvey Stone, Dick Joseph, Fred Robbins, Robert Sylvester, and John Kullers.

== See also ==
- List of programs broadcast by the DuMont Television Network
- List of surviving DuMont Television Network broadcasts

== Bibliography ==
- David Weinstein, The Forgotten Network: DuMont and the Birth of American Television (Philadelphia: Temple University Press, 2004) ISBN 1-59213-245-6
- Alex McNeil, Total Television, Fourth edition (New York: Penguin Books, 1980) ISBN 0-14-024916-8
- Tim Brooks and Earle Marsh, The Complete Directory to Prime Time Network TV Shows, Third edition (New York: Ballantine Books, 1964) ISBN 0-345-31864-1
