= Jerry Fairbanks =

American film director and producer (1904–1995)

Gerald Bertram Fairbanks (November 1, 1904 – June 21, 1995) was an American film producer and director in the Hollywood motion picture and television industry.

== Biography ==
Fairbanks was born in San Francisco on November 1, 1904 and survived the 1906 San Francisco earthquake. He began his career in film as a cameraman on silent movies such as John Barrymore's The Sea Beast (1926). This was followed by work on early sound productions such as Howard Hughes' film Hell's Angels (1930) in which he participated both as a biplane pilot and aerial cinematographer for the extensive World War I dogfight scenes.

His first foray into producing involved an innovative color series of theatrical short subjects for Universal Studios called Strange As It Seems (1930–1934). Based on the success of these productions, he was able to sell Paramount Pictures on three new series of short subjects entitled Unusual Occupations, Tex Avery's Speaking of Animals, and Popular Science.

The latter series was produced with the cooperation of the editors of Popular Science magazine and ran from 1935 to 1949. Films in the Unusual Occupations and Popular Science series were made in Magnacolor and showcased a vast assortment of groundbreaking wonders from the world of science and industry.

In 1945, Fairbanks won the Academy Award for Best Short Subject, One Reel for Who's Who in Animal Land, and was nominated again in that category in 1948 for Moon Rockets. Overall, he won two Academy Awards and was nominated for a total of five such awards.

In the mid-1940s, Fairbanks was intrigued by television and became one of the first film producers to create filmed programs specifically for this new medium. His initial series was a 26-episode crime drama, Public Prosecutor, originally produced for NBC Television, but briefly shown on DuMont and in syndication instead.

He broke new ground in television by inventing for NBC in 1947 the Multi-Cam multiple-camera setup of production, assisted by producer-director Frank Telford, which is still used by sitcoms today. This system allows a series of three or more cameras to be operated from different angles while remaining in sync with the sound track when turned off and on. Fairbanks recalled, "If you used three or four cameras, all running continuously, you were using up a tremendous amount of film. We developed a Multicam system where the soundtrack ran continuously. Cameras could be switched on and off at will, and the film from each camera could still be keyed to the soundtrack. That brought the cost way down."

Desi Arnaz and Karl Freund are often cited as the inventors when producing I Love Lucy, but Arnaz himself gave credit to Fairbanks as the originator of this system. The only enhancement Arnaz made was to use 35 mm film instead of the 16 mm film which Fairbanks employed. Fairbanks, head of NBC's fledgling film department in 1947–1948, never filed a patent for his invention, and so lost out on fame for his invention. "We never pursued it because I was trying to help the industry. We were trying to promote the use of film for television. I was more interested in promoting the film industry than in getting an individual reputation for things."

Fairbanks used the Zoomar Lens, now used almost universally in television to zoom from long shots to close-ups at will, without having to interrupt the telecasting to change lenses.

He also gave James Dean his very first opportunities on film, first in two Pepsi-Cola TV commercials and then as John the Apostle in the Father Peyton's Family Theater TV episode entitled "Hill Number One," broadcast on Easter Sunday, April 1, 1950.

== New direction ==
Paramount, seeing TV as the great rival to its continued success, issued an ultimatum to Fairbanks in 1949 — either stop making shows for TV or his association with Paramount was at an end. Fairbanks chose television and continued making Popular Science films for the new medium of TV.

Jerry Fairbanks, like other visionaries who had embraced the idea of commercial television, had established himself early, before national networks were established—and well before stations in many cities were even built. This advance preparation made Fairbanks a key player in early television, when stations were scrambling for anything on film. But Fairbanks soon amassed an inventory of filmed, low-budget productions that were already dated or outmoded by the early 1950s, while his competitors flourished with new programming especially designed for the new TV formats. In 1953, Fairbanks declared bankruptcy, and virtually ended TV production in favor of commercial and industrial films.

One industrial film he produced was for the Armstrong Cork Company in 1959. Entitled Letter to Moscow, this propaganda film was designed as a slam to the Soviet way of life. The film highlighted the Armstrong company and how people could hold good jobs working in factories. Filmed in Kankakee, Illinois and Lancaster, Pennsylvania, the film, when completed was supposedly hand-delivered to Nikita Khrushchev in Moscow.

Among other later projects, in 1956, Fairbanks directed Down Liberty Road (aka Freedom Highway) with Angie Dickinson. In 1967 he produced Bamboo Saucer, a theatrical feature starring Dan Duryea, one of the more engaging sci-fi films on UFOs of that era, written and directed by Frank Telford. Fairbanks served a 5-year term from the late 1960s to the early 1970s as president of the Hollywood Chamber of Commerce — curiously, the first president in the 50-year history of the Chamber from the entertainment industry.

In his personal life, Fairbanks was twice married before meeting in 1945 his lifelong love, actress Marjorie Freeman (stage name: "Marjorie Marlow"). Among other things, Marjorie was a protégé of Max Reinhardt who auditioned for the part of Scarlett O'Hara in Gone with the Wind, and creator of the popular annual Ladies of Charity luncheon at the Beverly Hilton Hotel (which sponsored Mother Teresa's first visit to the USA). Fairbanks converted to Roman Catholicism to marry Freeman. In 1983, the two re-located north to Santa Barbara, California.

Jerry was a fine golfer for some years, among other things winning in 1954 the handicap championship at the Lakeside Golf Club (where he was a member since 1950). His TV production company produced 26 episodes of Celebrity Golf, starring Sam Snead and various well-known Hollywood movie stars. He was also an avid aviator, having learned to fly in 1926 and then flying his own plane all over the USA on production assignments.

== Death ==
Fairbanks predeceased his wife Marjorie (1921–2010) on June 21, 1995 at Santa Barbara, California at the age of 90. They adopted a daughter, Jeralyn.

Jerry Fairbanks has a Star on the Hollywood Walk of Fame at 6384 Hollywood Blvd, at the corner of Hollywood and Cahuenga.
