= The Talent Shop =

- Genre: Talent show
- Starring: Pat Adair (host); Fred Robbins (host)
- Country of origin: United States
- Original language: English

Production
- Running time: 30 minutes

Original release
- Network: DuMont
- Release: October 13, 1951 – March 29, 1952

The Talent Shop is a TV series on the DuMont Television Network which aired from October 13, 1951, to March 29, 1952. The hosts were Fred Robbins and Pat Adair. This was a talent show for young people, set in a New York City drugstore.

== Episode status ==
As with most DuMont series, no episodes are known to exist.

== See also ==
- List of programs broadcast by the DuMont Television Network
- List of surviving DuMont Television Network broadcasts

== Bibliography ==
- David Weinstein, The Forgotten Network: DuMont and the Birth of American Television (Philadelphia: Temple University Press, 2004) ISBN 1-59213-245-6
- Alex McNeil, Total Television, Fourth edition (New York: Penguin Books, 1980) ISBN 0-14-024916-8
- Tim Brooks and Earle Marsh, The Complete Directory to Prime Time Network TV Shows, Third edition (New York: Ballantine Books, 1964) ISBN 0-345-31864-1
