= 1947 in television =

The year 1947 in television involved some significant events. Below is a list of television-related events during 1947.

== Events ==
- January 3 – Proceedings of the U.S. Congress are televised for the first time.
- January 22 – The first commercial television station west of the Mississippi River, KTLA, begins operation in Hollywood.
- January 29 – RCA company demonstrates an all-electronic color television system using live images, to the US Federal Communications Commission.
- January 30 – The FCC rejects CBS' color television system.
- February 10-March 11 – BBC television service in the UK is temporarily suspended due to a national fuel crisis.
- March 11 – The first successful American children's television series, Movies for Small Fry debuts on the DuMont Network.
- July 16 – RCA demonstrates the world's first all-electronic color camera to the Federal Communications Commission. (Only television receivers are present at the demonstration on January 29; the camera is at a remote studio.)
- September 30 – The opening game of the World Series is the first World Series game to be telecast. The 1947 World Series is watched by an estimated 3.9 million people (many watching in bars and other public places), becoming television's first mass audience.
- October 5 – The first telecast of a presidential address from the White House. President Truman speaks about the world food crisis. It is preceded by a Jell-O commercial, and features the president discussing his program for food rationing. The address is televised by WTVW-TV (presently WJLA-TV Channel 7 in Washington DC) as part of its inaugural broadcast. It is also simulcast by radio. It was long believed that no copy of this broadcast existed, but segments are preserved on kinescope in the Library of Congress. (For the record, President Franklin Roosevelt's address broadcast over NBC experimental television W2XBS—now WNBC—at the 1939 New York World's Fair preceded the 1947 Truman broadcast. However, Truman's broadcast is the first from inside the White House.)
- October 13 – The puppet show series Junior Jamboree, later known as Kukla, Fran and Ollie, premieres on WBKB in Chicago, Illinois.
- November 6 – Meet the Press first appears as a local program in Washington, D.C.
- November 8 – Memorial service broadcast from the Cenotaph by the BBC, using tele-recording for the first time.
- The first Hollywood movie production for TV, The Public Prosecutor.
- There are 250,000 television sets in use in the United States.

== Debuts ==
- March 11 – Small Fry Club (1947–1951)
- April 3 – Juvenile Jury (1947–1954)
- May – The Swift Home Service Club (1947–?)
- May 2 – Doorway to Fame (1947–1949)
- May 7 – Kraft Television Theater on NBC, the first regularly scheduled drama series on a network (1947–1958)
- May 15 – King Cole's Birthday Party (1947–1949)
- May 21 – In the Kelvinator Kitchen (1947–1948)
- June 16 – The Walter Compton News (1947–1948)
- July 8 – Major League Baseball on NBC (1947–2000)
- July 25 – Musical Merry-Go-Round (1947–1949)
- October 13 – Junior Jamboree (later named Kukla, Fran and Ollie), on WBKB in Chicago (1947–1957)
- October 1947 – first telecording by BBC (kinescope), showing black singer Adelaide Hall performing two songs with chorus and her guitar
- November 18 – situation comedy Mary Kay and Johnny on Dumont network (1947–1950)
- November 19 – Missus Goes a Shopping debuts on CBS, becoming that network's first commercial daytime series.
- November 20 – Meet the Press, first network telecast on NBC (1947–present)
- November 27 – Charade Quiz (1947–1949)
- November – Swing Into Sports (1947–1949)
- December 4 – Television Playhouse (1947–1948)
- December 8 – Americana (1947–1949)
- December 27 – Puppet Television Theater (later called Howdy Doody), a children's television program on NBC (1947–1960)
- The Jack Eigen Show (1947–1951)
- Café Continental (UK) on the BBC Television Service) (1947–1953)

== Television shows ==
Series	Debut	Ended	Network
Swing Into Sports	1947	1949	Dumont
The Jack Eigen Show	1947	1951	Dumont
Chicagoland Mystery Players	1947	July 23, 1950	WGN-TV
Small Fry Club	1947	1951	Dumont
Juvenile Jury	1947	1954	NBC
The Swift Home Service Club	May 1947	?	NBC
Doorway to Fame	May 2, 1947	July 4, 1949	Dumont
Kraft Television Theater	May 7, 1947	1958	NBC
King Cole's Birthday Party	May 15, 1947	June 23, 1949	Dumont
In the Kelvinator Kitchen	1947	1948	NBC
The Walter Compton News	June 16, 1947	January 1948	Dumont
Major League Baseball on NBC	July 8, 1947	October 17, 2000	NBC
Musical Merry-Go-Round	1947	1949	NBC
Kukla, Fran and Ollie	October 13, 1947	1957	KNBH
Meet the Press	1947	Still in broadcast	NBC
Pantomime Quiz	November 13, 1947	October 9, 1959	KTLA
Mary Kay and Johnny	November 18, 1947	March 11, 1950	Dumont
Charade Quiz	1947	1949	Dumont
Television Playhouse	December 4, 1947	April 11, 1948	NBC
Americana	1947	1949	NBC
Howdy Doody	December 27, 1947	September 24, 1960	NBC
Eyewitness	1947	1948	
Know Your New York	1947	1948	Dumont
Highway to the Stars	1947	1947	Dumont
Look Upon a Star	1947	1947	Dumont

== Ending this year ==
Date	Show	Debut
January 17	The Voice of Firestone	1943
January 17	Let's Rhumba	1946
January 26	Face to Face	1946
March	Hour Glass	1946
May 16	Pinwright's Progress (UK)	1946
May 18	I Love to Eat	1946
May 27	Serving Through Science	1945
July 1	Cash and Carry	1946
October	Geographically Speaking	1946
Unknown	Campus Hoopla	1946

== Births ==
- January 2 – Jack Hanna, zookeeper
- January 8 – Laurie Walters, actress (Eight is Enough)
- January 17 - Jane Elliot, actress (General Hospital)
- January 19 - Paula Deen, chef, cookbook author, and TV personality
- January 21 - Jill Eikenberry, actress (L.A. Law)
- January 31
  - Glynn Turman, actor (A Different World, The Wire, House of Lies)
  - Jonathan Banks, actor
- February 2
  - Farrah Fawcett, actress (Charlie's Angels) (d. 2009)
  - Greg Antonacci, actor (d. 2017)
- February 3 - Tonea Stewart, actress (In the Heat of the Night)
- February 4 - Dan Quayle, politician
- February 20 – Peter Strauss, actor
- February 24 – Edward James Olmos, actor (Miami Vice, Battlestar Galactica)
- February 26 – Steve Melnyk, golfer
- February 28 - Stephanie Beacham, actress (Dynasty, The Colbys)
- March 1 – Alan Thicke, actor (Growing Pains) (d. 2016)
- March 6 – Rob Reiner, actor (All in the Family), producer and director (d. 2025)
- March 7 – Richard Lawson, actor
- March 12 – Mitt Romney, politician
- March 19 – Glenn Close, actress
- March 24 - Alan Sugar, English television presenter
- March 25 - Elton John, English singer, pianist and composer
- April 2 - Sam Anderson, actor, Perfect Strangers, Angel, Lost
- April 4
  - Luke Halpin, actor (Flipper)
  - Ray Fosse, baseball player (d. 2021)
- April 6 – John Ratzenberger, actor (Cheers)
- April 11 - Meshach Taylor, actor (d. 2014)
- April 12
  - Dan Lauria, actor
  - David Letterman, comedian and talk show host (The Late Show)
  - Wayne Northrop, actor (died 2024)
- April 16 - Kareem Abdul-Jabbar, NBA basketball player
- April 18
  - Dorothy Lyman, actress (Another World, Mama's Family, Generations)
  - Cindy Pickett, actress (Guiding Light, St. Elsewhere)
  - James Woods, actor (Holocaust, Shark)
- April 19 - Jeff Maxwell, actor (M*A*S*H)
- April 26 - Boyd Matson, former anchor of National Geographic Explorer
- May 6 - Alan Dale, actor (The Young Doctors, Neighbours)
- May 10
  - Marion Ramsey, actress and singer (Cos) (d. 2021)
  - Jay Ferguson, rock and pop musician (The Office)
- May 16 - Andrew Lack, television executive
- May 25 - Karen Valentine, actress (Room 222)
- May 29 - Anthony Geary, actor (General Hospital)
- June 3 - Shuki Levy, Israeli-American music composer
- June 14 - Len Berman, American television sportscaster
- June 16 - Al Cowlings, American football player
- June 20 - Paul Kreppel, actor and director (It's a Living)
- June 21
  - Meredith Baxter, actress (Family Ties)
  - Michael Gross, actor (Family Ties, The Young and the Restless)
- June 22
  - David Lander, comedic actor (Laverne & Shirley) (d. 2020)
  - Pete Maravich, NBA basketball player (d. 1988)
- June 25 - Jimmie Walker, actor (Good Times)
- June 26 - Carmen Finestra, producer and TV writer
- June 29 - Richard Lewis, comedian and actor (Anything but Love)
- July 1 - Shirley Hemphill, comedian and actress (What's Happening!!) (d. 1999)
- July 2 – Larry David, actor, writer and producer (Seinfeld, Curb Your Enthusiasm)
- July 3 – Betty Buckley, actress and singer (Eight is Enough)
- July 5 – Joe Brown, judge
- July 8 - Kim Darby, actress
- July 9 - O. J. Simpson, actor and former NFL football player
- July 20
  - Carlos Santana, guitarist
  - Rose Ann Scamardella, former anchorwoman
- July 22 – Albert Brooks, actor (The Simpsons), comedian and director
- July 23
  - Larry Manetti, actor (Magnum, P.I.)
  - Kaity Tong, American broadcast journalist
- July 24 - Robert Hays, American actor (Iron Man, Angie, Starman, FM)
- July 27 - Betty Thomas, actress (Hill Street Blues)
- July 28 - Sally Struthers, actress (All in the Family)
- July 30
  - Arnold Schwarzenegger, Austrian-born American actor, bodybuilder and 38th governor of California
  - William Atherton, American actor
- August 8 - Larry Wilcox, actor (CHiPs)
- August 13 - Gretchen Corbett, actress, The Rockford Files
- August 19 - Gerald McRaney, actor (Simon & Simon, Major Dad, Promised Land)
- August 20 - Ray Wise, actor (Twin Peaks)
- August 22 - Cindy Williams, actress (Laverne and Shirley) (d. 2023)
- August 28 - Debra Mooney, actress (Everwood)
- September 4 – Jane Curtin, actress and comedian (Saturday Night Live, Kate & Allie, 3rd Rock from the Sun)
- September 6 – Bob Jenkins, announcer (d. 2021)
- September 21 - Stephen King, author
- September 27
  - Liz Torres, actress (The John Larroquette Show)
  - Denis Lawson, actor
- October 1
  - Stephen Collins, actor (7th Heaven)
  - Larry Lamb, actor
- October 12 – Chris Wallace, television news anchor
- October 17 – Michael McKean, actor (Laverne & Shirley, Better Call Saul)
- October 18 – Joe Morton, actor
- October 24 – Kevin Kline, actor
- October 26 – Hillary Clinton, politician
- October 29 – Richard Dreyfuss, actor (The Education of Max Bickford)
- October 31
  - Deidre Hall, actress (Days of Our Lives)
  - Ira Joe Fisher, broadcaster
- November 2 - Kate Linder, actress (The Young and the Restless)
- November 3 - Shadoe Stevens, actor
- November 9 - Robert David Hall, actor (CSI: Crime Scene Investigation)
- November 13 - Joe Mantegna, actor (Criminal Minds)
- November 18 - Jameson Parker, actor (Simon & Simon)
- November 24 – Dwight Schultz, actor (The A-Team, Star Trek: The Next Generation, Chowder)
- November 25 – John Larroquette, actor (Night Court)
- December 2 – Leonard Lightfoot, American actor
- December 11
  - Terry Turner, producer
  - Bill Cunningham, talk show host
- December 21 – Kay Robertson, American television personality
- December 23 – Peter Kostis, American golf analyst
- December 29 – Ted Danson, actor (Cheers, Becker, CSI: Crime Scene Investigation)
- December 31 – Tim Matheson, actor (Jonny Quest, Space Ghost, The West Wing)

== Deaths ==
- February 26 – Kálmán Tihanyi, Hungarian physicist, major contributor to the development of the cathode-ray tube
