= 1947–48 United States network television schedule =

The 1947–48 United States network television schedule was nominally from September 1947 to March 1948, but scheduling ideas were still being developed and did not conform to modern standards. The schedule is followed by a list per network of returning series, new series, and series cancelled after the 1946–47 season.

Only NBC and DuMont had networks until ABC launched in April 1948 and CBS joined in May 1948. Coaxial cable connections were only available for a few cities on the East Coast. Most other parts of the United States created local shows or broadcast film programs.

Although fewer than twenty television stations were in operation at the end of 1947, more than 30 began broadcasting in 1948.

New series and those making their network debuts are highlighted in bold, while series that ended during the season are highlighted in italics. However, as network programming was still in its infancy and in a state of flux, all the new fall series below for this season began in November and December. A midseason replacement, DuMont's The Original Amateur Hour, first aired Sunday, January 18, 1948, was the most popular series of the 1947–48 television season.

Although television was still in its infancy, several notable series debuted during this season, particularly Mary Kay and Johnny (first sitcom to be broadcast on network television in the US, and likely the world's second television sitcom after British series Pinwright's Progress), Texaco Star Theatre (the variety show that made Milton Berle TV's first star) and The Ed Sullivan Show (which would run until 1971, with performances by Elvis Presley and The Beatles being among the highest-viewed moments in American television history).

Few recordings of live television from this season were preserved. Among the surviving kinescopes are six episodes of Kraft Television Theatre from 1948 (March 3, March 17, March 24, March 31, April 21, and May 5) held by the Library of Congress, an episode of Eye Witness from February 26, 1948, two episodes of The Swift Show from 1948 (May 13 and May 27) held by the UCLA Film and Television Archive, and an episode of NBC Symphony Orchestra with Arturo Toscanini from March 20, 1948, held by the Paley Center for Media.

One series that debuted during this season, Meet the Press, continues to air on NBC celebrating its seventy years as of 2017.

== Legend ==
- Light blue indicates local programming.
- Blue-gray indicates news programming.
- Light green indicates sporting events.
- Light purple indicates movies.

== Schedule ==
=== Sunday ===
Network		7:00 p.m.	7:30 p.m.	8:00 p.m.	8:30 p.m.	9:00 p.m.	9:30 p.m.	10:00 p.m.	10:30 p.m.
ABC	Spring	Local programming		**Hollywood Screen Test**	Local programming				
CBS	Summer	Local programming				**Toast of the Town**		Local programming	
DMN	Fall	Local programming							
DMN	Winter	**The Original Amateur Hour**		Local programming					
NBC		Local programming		**Television Playhouse** / Various specials				Local programming	

Notes: The Original Amateur Hour ran Sundays on DuMont beginning on January 18, 1948.

ABC began regular broadcasting in April 1948, with Hollywood Screen Test as its first network series.

CBS began broadcasting as a network in May 1948 and premiered Toast of the Town, better known as The Ed Sullivan Show, on June 20, 1948.

=== Monday ===
Network		7:00 p.m.	7:30 p.m.	8:00 p.m.	8:30 p.m.	9:00 p.m.	9:30 p.m.	10:00 p.m.	10:30 p.m.
ABC	August	**News and Views** (7:00) / Local Programming (7:15)	**Kiernan's Corner**	**Quizzing the News**	Local Programming				
CBS	Late Spring	Local programming	**CBS Television News** (7:30) / **Face the Music** (7:45)	Local Programming					
CBS	August	Local programming (7:00) / **Places Please** (7:15)	**CBS Television News** (7:30) / **Face the Music** (7:45)	Local Programming					
DMN	Fall	Small Fry Club	Doorway to Fame	Local programming		Boxing from Jamaica Arena			
DMN	Winter	Small Fry Club	**Camera Headlines** (7:30) / Local programming (7:45)	Local programming		Boxing from Jamaica Arena			
NBC	Fall	Local programming		Local programming (8:00) / **Americana** (8:10) / Local programming (8:40)		The Esso Newsreel (9:00) / Boxing from St. Nicholas Arena (9:10)			
NBC	Spring	Local programming	**America Song**	Local programming (8:00) / **Americana** (8:10) / Local programming (8:40)		The Esso Newsreel (9:00) / Boxing from St. Nicholas Arena (9:10)			

* The Walter Compton News aired on DuMont Monday through Friday from 6:45 to 7pm ET beginning on June 16 on WTTG and on August 25 on the DuMont network. In January 1948, Camera Headlines replaced The Walter Compton News and Look Upon a Star, airing Monday through Friday at 7:30pm ET, with I.N.S. Telenews following at 7:45pm ET on Tuesdays only.
** During the winter of 1948, The Esso Newsreel was replaced by the NBC Television Newsreel, which ran from Monday to Friday at 7:50, soon becoming the Camel Newsreel Theatre. America Song aired Mondays from 7:30 to 7:50 beginning in April.
*** During the late spring of 1948, CBS premiered the CBS Television News, running weekdays at 7:30, followed by Face the Music from 7:45 to 8:00.
**** Village Barn aired from 9:10 to 10:00 on NBC beginning in May.

=== Tuesday ===
Network		7:00 p.m.	7:30 p.m.	8:00 p.m.	8:30 p.m.	9:00 p.m.	9:30 p.m.	10:00 p.m.	10:30 p.m.
ABC	August	**News and Views** (7:00) / Local programming (7:15)	**Movieland Quiz**	Local programming					
CBS	Late Spring	Local programming	**CBS Television News** (7:30) / **Face the Music** (7:45)	Local programming					
CBS	Early Summer	Local programming	**CBS Television News** (7:30) / **Face the Music** (7:45)	Local programming		**We the People**	Local programming		
CBS	August	Local programming	**CBS Television News** (7:30) / **Face the Music** (7:45)	Local programming		**We the People**	**People's Platform**	Local programming	
DMN	Fall	Small Fry Club	Highway to the Stars	Western movie		**Mary Kay and Johnny** (9:00) / Local programming (9:15)	Local programming		
DMN	October	Small Fry Club	**Look Upon a Star**	Western movie		**Mary Kay and Johnny** (9:00) / Local programming (9:15)	Local programming		
DMN	Winter	Small Fry Club	**Camera Headlines** (7:30) / **I.N.S. Telenews** (7:45)	Western movie		**Mary Kay and Johnny** (9:00) / Local programming (9:15)	Local programming		
NBC	Fall	Local programming							
NBC	Summer	MLB on NBC	Major League Baseball (continued to game completion)						

=== Wednesday ===
Network		7:00 p.m.	7:30 p.m.	8:00 p.m.	8:30 p.m.	9:00 p.m.	9:30 p.m.	10:00 p.m.	10:30 p.m.
ABC	August	**News and Views** (7:00) / Local Programming (7:15)	**Critic at Large**	**The Gay Nineties Revue**	**Candid Microphone** (8:30) / **Three About Town** (8:45)	Local Programming	**Wrestling From Washington, D.C.**		
CBS	Late Spring	Local programming	**CBS Television News** (7:30) / **Face the Music** (7:45)	Local programming					
CBS	July	Local programming	**CBS Television News** (7:30) / **Face the Music** (7:45)	Local programming	**Winner Take All**	Local programming			
DMN	Fall	Small Fry Club	Local programming						
DMN	Winter	Small Fry Club	Local programming			**Court of Current Issues**	Local programming		
NBC		Local programming	Kraft Television Theatre		In the Kelvinator Kitchen (8:30) / Local programming (8:45)	Local programming			

* Winner Take All premiered on CBS in July.

=== Thursday ===
Network		7:00 p.m.	7:30 p.m.	8:00 p.m.	8:30 p.m.	9:00 p.m.	9:30 p.m.	10:00 p.m.	10:30 p.m.
ABC	August	**News and Views** (7:00) / Local Programming (7:15)	Local Programming		**Club Seven**	Local Programming			
CBS	Late Spring	Local programming	**CBS Television News** (7:30) / **Face the Music** (7:45)	Local programming					
CBS	Early Summer	Local programming	**CBS Television News** (7:30) / **Face the Music** (7:45)	**To the Queen's Taste**	Local programming				
DMN	Fall	Small Fry Club	King Cole's Birthday Party	Local programming	**Charade Quiz**	Local programming			
DMN	Winter	King Cole's Birthday Party		Local programming	**Charade Quiz**	Local programming			
NBC		Local programming	Local programming (7:30) / The Esso Newsreel (7:50)	**Meet the Press**	Musical Merry-Go-Round	You Are an Artist (9:00) / Local programming (9:15)	Juvenile Jury	Local programming	

Notes: On CBS, To the Queen's Taste began airing during the late spring or early summer of 1948.

On DuMont, King Cole's Birthday Party also was known simply as Birthday Party. It debuted on May 15, 1947, on DuMont's New York City station, WABD and by early 1948 was carried by the entire network. The date on which it switched from a New York-only broadcast to a network-wide one is unclear.

=== Friday ===
Network		7:00 p.m.	7:30 p.m.	8:00 p.m.	8:30 p.m.	9:00 p.m.	9:30 p.m.	10:00 p.m.	10:30 p.m.
ABC	August	**News and Views** (7:00) / Local Programming (7:15)	Local Programming	**Teenage Book Club**	**That Reminds Me**	Local Programming			
CBS	Late Spring	Local programming	**CBS Television News** (7:30) / **Face the Music** (7:45)	**Sportsman's Quiz** (8:00) / **What's It Worth** (8:05)	Local programming				
CBS	August	Local Programming (7:00) / **Places Please** (7:15)	**CBS Television News** (7:30) / **Face the Music** (7:45)	**Sportsman's Quiz** (8:00) / **What's It Worth** (8:05)	Local programming				
DMN		Small Fry Club	Local programming						
NBC	Fall	Local programming		Campus Hoopla (8:00) / The World in Your Home (8:15)	Local programming		Boxing from Madison Square Garden		
NBC	Spring	Local programming		Campus Hoopla (8:00) / The World in Your Home (8:15)	**Stop Me If You've Heard This One**	Local programming	Boxing from Madison Square Garden		

* Sportsman's Quiz and What's It Worth premiered on CBS during the late spring.

=== Saturday ===
Network		7:00 p.m.	7:30 p.m.	8:00 p.m.	8:30 p.m.	9:00 p.m.	9:30 p.m.	10:00 p.m.	10:30 p.m.
ABC	August	**News and Views** (7:00) / Local programming (7:15)	**Sports with Joe Hasel** (7:30) / Local programming (7:45)	Local programming					
NBC		Local programming			Television Screen Magazine	Local programming			

== By network ==
=== ABC ===
**New Series**

- **Candid Microphone**
- **Club Seven**
- **Critic at Large**
- **The Gay Nineties Revue**
- **Hollywood Screen Test**
- **Kiernan's Corner**
- **Movieland Quiz**
- **News and Views**
- **Sports with Joe Hasel**
- **Teenage Book Club**
- **That Reminds Me**
- **Three About Town**
- **Quizzing the News**
- **Wrestling from Washington D.C.**

=== CBS ===
**New Series**

- **CBS Television News**
- **Face the Music**
- **The Fred Waring Show**
- **Sportsman's Quiz**
- **To the Queen's Taste**
- **Toast of the Town**
- **We the People**
- **What's It Worth**
- **Winner Take All**

=== DuMont ===
**Returning series**

- The Adventures of Oky Doky
- Boxing from Jamaica Arena
- Camera Headlines
- Doorway to Fame
- Highway to the Stars
- The Jack Eigen Show
- Key to the Missing
- King Cole's Birthday Party
- The Original Amateur Hour
- Small Fry Club
- Western movie

**New series**

- **Camera Headlines** *
- **Charade Quiz**
- **Court of Current Issues** *
- **I.N.S. Telenews** *
- **Look Upon a Star** *
- **Mary Kay and Johnny**
- **The Original Amateur Hour** *
- **Playroom** *
- **The Walter Compton News** *

=== NBC ===
**Returning Series**

- America Song
- Americana
- Author Meets the Critics
- The Bigelow Show
- Boxing from Madison Square Garden
- Camel Newsreel Theatre
- Campus Hoopla
- Duffy's Tavern
- Gillette Cavalcade of Sports
- Hour Glass
- Juvenile Jury
- Kraft Television Theatre
- Mary Kay and Johnny
- Meet the Press
- Musical Miniatures
- The Nature of Things
- Story of the Week
- The Swift Show
- Television Screen Magazine
- The Texaco Star Theater
- You Are an Artist

**New Series**

- **Admiral Presents Five Star Revue — Welcome Aboard**
- **The Black Robe**
- **The Chevrolet Tele-Theatre**
- **Girl Anour Town**
- **Greatest Fight of the Century**
- **The Gulf Road Show Starring Bob Smith**
- **Mary Margaret McBride**
- **NBC Presents**
- **NBC Television Newsreel** *
- **The Philco Television Playhouse**
- **Picture This**
- **Princess Sagaphi**
- **Stop Me If You've Heard This One** *
- **The Swift Show** *
- **The Ted Steele Show**
- **Television Playhouse** *
- **Village Barn** *
- **Wrestling From St. Nicholas Arena**
- **Your Show Time**

Not returning from 1946–47:

- The Borden Show
- Bristol-Myers Tele-Varieties
- Broadway Previews
- Face to Face
- Famous Fights
- Geographically Speaking
- Hour Glass
- I Love to Eat
- In Town Today
- Let's Rhumba
- NBC Television Theatre

Note: The * indicates that the program was introduced in midseason.
