= 1947–48 United States network television schedule (daytime) =

NOTE: This page is missing info on the DuMont Network, which started daytime transmission before any other United States television network.

== Monday-Friday ==
		1:00 pm	1:30 pm	2:00 pm	2:30 pm	3:00 pm	3:30 pm	4:00 pm	4:30 pm	5:00 pm	5:30 pm	6:00 pm	6:30 pm
ABC	August	local programming									The Singing Lady	local programming
CBS	May	local programming	The Missus Goes a-Shopping	local programming
CBS	August	local programming	The Missus Goes a-Shopping	local programming									6:30 PM: The Adventures of Lucky Pup (since 8/23) 6:45 PM: local programming
NBC	Fall	The Swift Home Service Club	local programming
NBC	November	The Swift Home Service Club	local programming							Playtime		local programming
NBC	February	The Swift Home Service Club	local programming						Playtime (to 2/18)		Howdy Doody	local programming
NBC	Spring	local programming									Howdy Doody	local programming
DMN	Fall	?											6:30 PM: local programming 6:45 PM: The Walter Compton News
DMN	Winter	?

== By network ==
=== ABC ===
New Series

- The Singing Lady

=== CBS ===
New Series

- The Adventures of Lucky Pup
- The Missus Goes a-Shopping

Returning Series

Not Returning From 1946 to 1947

=== NBC ===
Returning Series

- The Swift Home Service Club

New Series

- Howdy Doody
- Playtime

Not Returning From 1946 to 1947

=== DuMont ===
Returning Series

- The Walter Compton News

New Series

Not Returning From 1946 to 1947

== See also ==
- 1947-48 United States network television schedule (prime-time)

== Sources ==
- https://web.archive.org/web/20071015122215/http://curtalliaume.com/abc_day.html
- https://web.archive.org/web/20071015122235/http://curtalliaume.com/cbs_day.html
- https://web.archive.org/web/20071012211242/http://curtalliaume.com/nbc_day.html
