= Bowling Headliners =

- Presented by: Jimmy Powers and Al Cirillo (ABC); Joe Hasel (DuMont)
- Country of origin: United States

Production
- Running time: 30 Minutes

Original release
- Network: ABC (1948-49); DuMont (1949-50)
- Release: December 26, 1948 – April 9, 1950

Bowling Headliners is television's first nationally broadcast bowling show. It aired on ABC from December 26, 1948, to October 30, 1949, and on DuMont from November 13, 1949, to April 9, 1950.

The series aired from Rego Park Lanes in Queens, New York. The original commentators were Jimmy Powers and Al Cirillo. When the show moved to DuMont, Joe Hasel took over as host. Cirillo also produced the program. Other hosts included Russ Hodges and Bill Slater.

Each episode of Bowling Headliners had two nationally known professional bowlers competing as part of a found-robin elimination tournament. An audience-participation feature invited viewers to send letters about their bowling abilities. Each week two letter-writers were selected to compete against two members of the audience at the bowling alley in three-frame matches with prizes available.\

Edelbrew Brewery Inc. of Brooklyn signed a contract in January 1949 to sponsor a 15-minute segment of Bowling Headliners on four of ABC's eastern stations. It was the show's first sponsor. In March 1949, the program lost what would have been another beer sponsorship. The New York State Liquor Authority canceled a contract that would have added Ballantine as a sponsor. The authority cited the bowling alley's selling of Ballantine, saying that the proposed advertising would amount to subsidizing the alley's operations. Officials of the alley and Ballantine proposed stopping sales there, but the authority did not change its decision.

The show was featured on the cover of the October 29, 1949, TV Guide when the magazine was still a local publication from New York City.

The series is believed to be lost.

== See also ==
- List of programs broadcast by the DuMont Television Network
- List of surviving DuMont Television Network broadcasts

== Bibliography ==
- David Weinstein, The Forgotten Network: DuMont and the Birth of American Television (Philadelphia: Temple University Press, 2004) ISBN 1-59213-245-6
- Alex McNeil, Total Television, Fourth edition (New York: Penguin Books, 1980) ISBN 0-14-024916-8
- Tim Brooks and Earle Marsh, The Complete Directory to Prime Time Network TV Shows, Third edition (New York: Ballantine Books, 1964) ISBN 0-345-31864-1
