= Cleopatra Collins =

- Star Stage episode
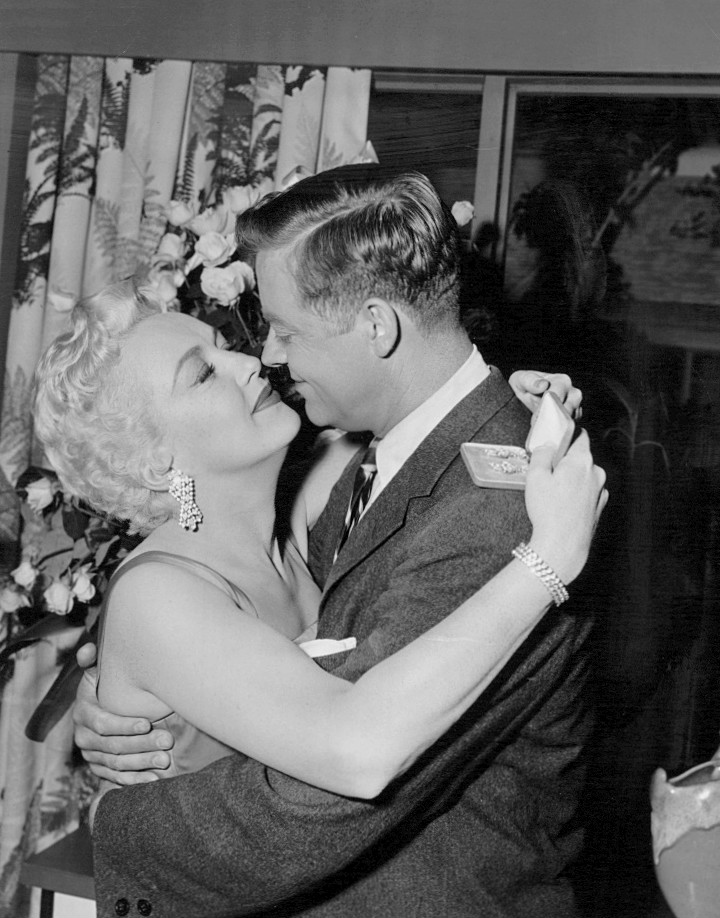
- Betty Grable and Casey Adams in a "Cleopatra Collins" promo image
- Episode no.: Season 1 Episode 27
- Directed by: Sidney Lanfield
- Written by: Fay Kanin; Michael Kanin
- Presented by: Jeffrey Lynn
- Cinematography by: John L. Russell
- Editing by: Michael R. McAdam
- Original air date: March 9, 1956
- Running time: 30 mins

Guest appearances
- Betty Grable as Cleopatra Collins; Max Showalter (credited as Casey Adams) as Pete; Rick Jason as Pookey - the Rajah of Pukhanistir; Louise Beavers as Effie; Jack Kruschen as Horace; Gordon Mills as Harry

"Cleopatra Collins" is a 1956 American comedic television play starring Betty Grable, in her first television role. It was released as part of the Star Stage anthology series. It also features Max Showalter (credited as Casey Adams) and Rick Jason.

== Background ==
Intending to be the pilot episode for a continuing series, Grable was initially disappointed it was passed on but she was then able to guest star on an episode of The Lucy–Desi Comedy Hour, "Lucy Wins a Racehorse", and later expressed happiness that "Cleopatra" had failed as a pilot and that "Television is a much harder grind than the movies ever were. You have to work that much faster." The pilot was filmed in three days with no rehearsals.

The play was Grable's first dramatic television performance. It was soon followed by Twentieth Century.

== Plot ==
Betty Grable plays a former Miss America who has been married to Pete for eight years. Her birthday party attracts many former romantic partners, including a Rajah called Pooke. Her current husband, jealous from all the attention given to her, ends up scaring them off.

== Reception ==
In Variety, their review said "All about it does is to give Miss Grable latitude to strut her physical magnificence ... much was made of [her] dramatic debut in TV and with her one can forget her acting albeit well mannered and acceptably pleasing .... Miss Grable acts out her part as if the watchers were listening rather than ogling".

It was rerun on July 20, 1956, and The Hollywood Reporter said that its rerun was "much to Grable's embarrassment".
