= DuMont Evening News =

- Also known as: Morgan Beatty and the News
- Presented by: Morgan Beatty
- Country of origin: United States

Production
- Running time: 15 minutes

Original release
- Network: DuMont
- Release: September 1954 – April 1, 1955

The DuMont Evening News is an American news program which aired Monday through Friday at 7:15pm ET on the DuMont Television Network during the 1954–1955 season. Presented by Morgan Beatty, the 15-minute show was the network's third and final attempt at a nightly news broadcast.

== History ==
The network's previous attempts at successful news broadcasts were The Walter Compton News (June 1947 to 1948, moving from WTTG in Washington DC to the network on August 25, 1947) and I.N.S. Telenews / Camera Headlines (January 1948 to 1949).

The DuMont Evening News was shown from 7:15-7:30 PM ET, immediately following the popular Captain Video. The show was one of the many axed due to the network's financial problems.

Beatty had been lured over from NBC News. After DuMont's newscast folded, he returned to NBC. He is best known for being the first to broadcast a news bulletin announcing that the Russians had launched Sputnik 1 on October 4, 1957, over the NBC Radio Network.

== Episode status ==
As with most DuMont programs, no episodes are known to exist. Kinescopes were not available until the fall of 1947, and were used sparingly in its early years.

== See also ==
- Television news in the United States
- List of programs broadcast by the DuMont Television Network
- List of surviving DuMont Television Network broadcasts

== Bibliography ==
- David Weinstein, The Forgotten Network: DuMont and the Birth of American Television (Philadelphia: Temple University Press, 2004) ISBN 1-59213-245-6
- Alex McNeil, Total Television, Fourth edition (New York: Penguin Books, 1980) ISBN 0-14-024916-8
- Tim Brooks and Earle Marsh, The Complete Directory to Prime Time Network TV Shows, Third edition (New York: Ballantine Books, 1964) ISBN 0-345-31864-1
