= Bob Emery (broadcaster) =

Radio and television pioneer and children's show host

Big Brother Bob Emery
- Emery at WGI in 1924
- Born: Clair Robert Emery; August 12, 1897; Abington, Massachusetts
- Died: July 18, 1982 (aged 84); Newton, Massachusetts
- Occupation: Broadcaster
- Known for: Small Fry Club

Clair Robert "Bob" Emery (August 12, 1897–July 18, 1982), known professionally as Big Brother Bob Emery, was a radio and television pioneer and children's show host. He is best known for his pioneer late-1940s network television show, Small Fry Club, and for his long career as a local broadcaster in Boston before and after that.

== Early life and career ==
Emery was born on August 12, 1897, in Abington, Massachusetts. Some sources say his birth name was recorded as Clair Robins Emery. Years later, his name was referred to in print sources as "Clair Robert Emery." His father James was a farmer, and he was sent to the Farm and Trade School on Thompson's Island, from which he graduated in 1912. He then attended North Abington High School, but did not graduate. He found employment at Gilchrist's department store, selling shoes.

Emery began performing on radio as part of the all-male Gilchrist Quartet, made up of department store employees. He was so well-received on the air that he was hired as an announcer at radio station WGI in Medford Hillside, Massachusetts, which had been one of the first American radio stations to broadcast regular programming (in 1919, under the callsign 1XE). Emery was a singer and announcer (identifying himself on the air by his initials "CRE", a holdover from ham radio common in early commercial radio) there. In 1924, he created a children's program called the "Big Brother Club." It was a time when nearly every radio station had a man or woman who told bed-time stories to the kids, and Boston radio had several. Bob Emery would become the best known, going on to a career in both radio and TV that lasted from the early 1920s till he retired in the late 1960s. When Emery first put the show on the air, it was known as the "Big Brother Club" (this was long before the 1949 publication of the novel Nineteen Eighty-Four which lent a sinister cast to the term "Big Brother"; the meaning then was just an affectionate older mentor). He used as his theme song a hit from that era, "The Grass is Always Greener in the Other Fella's Yard." He continued to use that theme song for decades, first on radio and later on television. On radio, Emery invited the children who listened to become members of his "club": those who did so received a membership card and a pin. Members were expected to do good deeds: the club's slogan was "Be someone's big brother or sister every day," and to be a member in good standing, children were asked to write Emery a letter each week describing the good deed they had done that week. By 1929, 47,000 children were members of the Big Brother Club.

WGI was undergoing financial difficulties (it folded in 1925), so in late September 1924 Emery moved to a new Boston station, WEEI, owned by the Edison Electric Illuminating Company. He did his show there from late September 1924 until the early 1930s.

== New York career ==
In the early 1930s, Emery took a radio job in New York City, first working for NBC and then working at several local stations in New York, most notably WOR, where he began on radio and then migrated to television, hosting a program called "Video Varieties."

He then hosted Small Fry Club (Note: "Small fry" (originally meaning a small fish) is an American slang expression for "child" or "children".) (also known as Movies for Small Fry), one of the earliest TV series made for children, on the DuMont Television Network. Emery continued to use "Big Brother Bob Emery" as his stage name in the show.

Small Fry Club aired from March 11, 1947, to June 15, 1951. It originally aired weekly, but soon expanded to five days a week, airing Monday through Friday at 7pm ET. According to television historians Tim Brooks and Earle Marsh, the show was possibly the first television series to air five days per week.

This weekday series was one of the few successful series on DuMont, and aired in the evenings for more than four seasons before it was cancelled in 1951.

A recording of part of one episode is known to exist at the Paley Center for Media.

Beginning on January 18, 1948, Emery also hosted a new program, Rainbow House on DuMont. The teenage show was based on a radio program that Emery had on WOR (AM).

== Back in Boston ==
After Small Fry Club was cancelled, Emery returned to Boston and continued to do versions of the show on WBZ-TV, still under the title Small Fry Club, (Note: Stuart Fishcher's book, Kids' TV: The First Twenty-Five Years, gives the name of the WBZ-TV program as The Big Brother Bob Emery Show.) until his retirement in January 1968.

Emery ran a show that was both entertaining and educational, with segments about current events, literature, travel, music, and ethics (good manners, being respectful to others, etc.). He sang and played the ukulele or the banjo and had guest performers, as well as interesting speakers who were doing things kids might find exciting. The Big Brother Club had membership cards and an official button (in the shape of a WEEI microphone). Emery also wrote a newspaper column about club activities. WEEI would also sponsor events that Big Brother Club members could attend, including a day at the zoo or a picnic. And while the show had sponsors, Emery was known for caring about kids and not doing an excessive amount of hype.

Emery had several theme songs, one of which was the 1924 song (by Raymond B. Egan and Richard A. Whiting) "The Grass is Always Greener in the Other Fellow's Yard", about being satisfied with what you have and not being envious. He opened his show with this, as well as with a singing jingle about WEEI. His closing song was "So Long Small Fry", written by Bill Wirges

Emery died on July 18, 1982, in Newton, Massachusetts. He was inducted into the Massachusetts Broadcasters Hall of Fame in 2010.

== See also ==
- List of programs broadcast by the DuMont Television Network
- List of surviving DuMont Television Network broadcasts
- 1947-48 United States network television schedule
