= With This Ring (TV series) =

- Presented by: Bill Slater; Martin Gabel
- Country of origin: United States
- No. of episodes: 8

Production
- Running time: 30 minutes

Original release
- Network: DuMont
- Release: January 21 – March 11, 1951

With This Ring (originally known as Happily Ever After) is a prime time panel show aired by the DuMont Television Network on Sundays from January 21, 1951, to March 11, 1951.

The show featured engaged couples who had recently applied for a marriage license. They were given scenarios about marriage and marital problems sent in by viewers, and would discuss how they would handle each situation. The show was initially hosted by Bill Slater, but the show quickly changed hosts to Martin Gabel, then left the air.

This show is not related in any way to a 15-minute syndicated program of the same name that aired weekly (usually on Sundays) on local stations throughout the U.S. for about 25 years beginning in the early 1970s. The latter program was a Roman Catholic-produced show concerning the church's doctrinal and moral positions on marriage and family life, and was produced at WJBK-TV in Detroit.

As with most DuMont shows, the series is considered lost.

== See also ==
- List of programs broadcast by the DuMont Television Network
- List of surviving DuMont Television Network broadcasts

== Bibliography ==
- Tim Brooks and Earle Marsh, The Complete Directory to Prime Time Network TV Shows, Second edition (New York: Ballantine Books, 1981) ISBN 0-345-29587-0
