= Star Stage =

American TV anthology series (1955–1956)

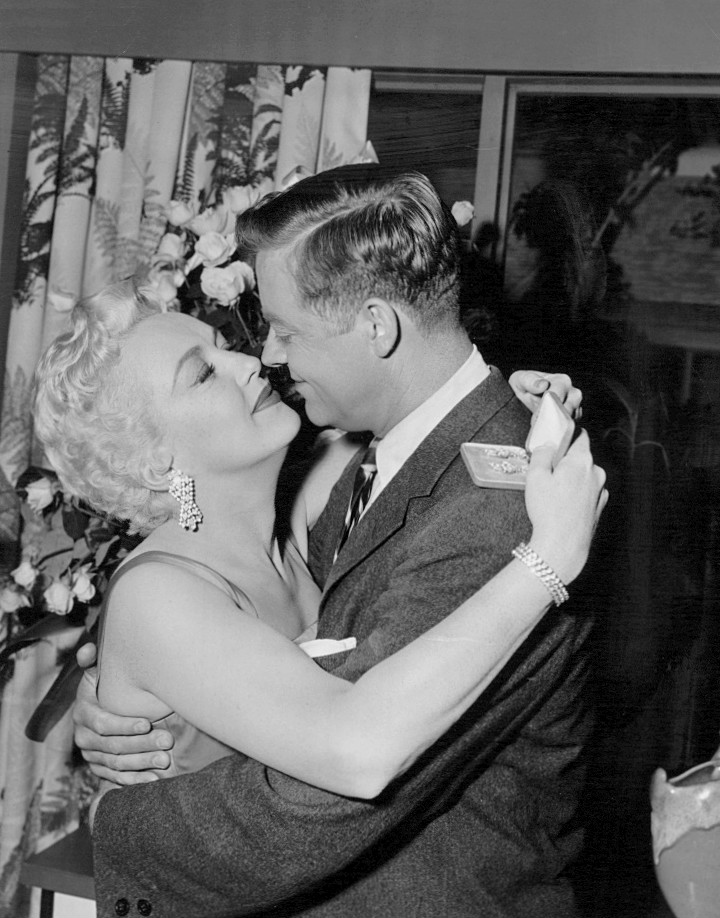
Betty Grable and Casey Adams in Cleopatra Collins, 1956

Star Stage is a half-hour American television anthology series that began on September 9, 1955, and ended on September 7, 1956.

It was sponsored on alternate weeks by Chesebrough-Ponds and Campbell Soup Company and hosted by Jeffrey Lynn, who became host on the November 18 telecast. Thirty-nine episodes aired on NBC. Approximately two-thirds of the episodes were done live and the remainder were filmed. Filmed episodes were produced by Revue. Some episodes originated from WRCA-TV in New York City, and others came from KRCA-TV in Los Angeles. When the program debuted, it was carried live on 31 stations and by delayed broadcast on 12.

Guest stars included: Mary Astor, Ralph Bellamy, Polly Bergen, Ward Bond, Eddie Bracken, Rod Cameron, Wendell Corey, Joseph Cotten, Jeanne Crain, Paul Douglas, Dan Duryea, Joan Fontaine, Greer Garson, Betty Grable, Lorne Greene, Dennis Morgan, Sylvia Sidney, Jack Whiting, Cornel Wilde, and Alan Young.

Mort Abrahams was the executive producer, and Charles Russell was the initial producer, In March 1956, S. Mark Smith was named producer. Directors included feature film directors, Robert Stevenson, Sidney Lanfield, Felix E. Feist, and Don Weis.

The episode "Killer on Horseback" (February 3, 1956). starring Cameron, was the pilot for the TV series State Trooper.

== Episodes ==
Partial List of Episodes of Star Stage
Date	Title	Actor(s)
September 16, 1955	"Cop Without a Badge"	Joey Walsh, James Gregory
October 7, 1955	"On Trial"	Joseph Cotten
December 25, 1955	"The Knife"	Donald Woods, Pud Flanagan, Edward Binns, Barbara Joyce, Anne Hegira
January 27, 1956	"Screen Credit"	Cornel Wilde, Carolyn Jones, Jim Backus, Hal Peary, Allen Jenkins
March 9, 1956	"Cleopatra Collins"	Betty Grable, Max Showalter, Rick Jason, Louise Beavers, Jack Kruschen, Gordon Mills, Leon Tyler
February 24, 1956	"Career"	Greer Garson, Patric Knowles, Stephen Bekassy, Richard Erdman, Sarah Selby, Douglas Evans, Mandie Prickett
August 10, 1956	"The Sainted General"	Luther Adler

== Critical response ==
A review of the program's premiere episode in The New York Times said that Sidney "did her usual competent job on a fairly routine plot". However, the review said, "the over-all tone was sluggish", such that dialog impeded the episode's progress.
