= H. R. Baukhage =

American journalist and broadcaster

Baukhage

Hilmar Robert Baukhage (January 7, 1889 – January 31, 1976) was an American journalist and broadcaster. He was known to the public only as H. R. Baukhage or just Baukhage.

== Early life and news career ==
Baukhage was born on January 7, 1889, in LaSalle, Illinois; his family later moved to Buffalo. A member of the University of Chicago class of 1911, he received a Bachelor of Philosophy degree from that university and studied in Bonn, Kiel, Freiburg, and Paris.

Baukhage served on the Army newspaper Stars and Stripes in Paris during World War I, where he covered the Paris Peace Conference of 1919. He served on Stars and Stripes with Steve Early, later a White House Press Secretary for the entirety of Franklin D. Roosevelt's administration.

Later, Baukhage was a wire service reporter for the Associated Press and worked under David Lawrence for United States News (later merged into U.S. News & World Report).

== Radio reporter and commentator ==
David Lawrence recommended Baukhage to NBC News and Baukhage began his radio career with five-minute wrapups on the National Home and Farm Hour in 1932 or 1934. Drawing on his previous experience as an actor and his natural gruff affect and raspy baritone, Baukhage added a staccato verbal style and his signature abrupt sign-on "Baukhage talking" which became well-known to a generation of American news listeners. Radio shows for which Baukhage provided news commentary or reporting over the course of his career also included Along the News Front, Baukhage Talking, Four Star News, News and Comment, and Weekly War Journal.

Baukhage became a national correspondent for NBC in the 1930s and he and David Lawrence were that network's first correspondents based in Washington, D. C. In 1938 Lawrence introduced Baukhage to Pauline Frederick; Frederick became his assistant, working for him from 1938 to 1944, and Baukhage her mentor. Frederick's able presence helped Baukhage expand his journalistic endeavors, and for a while he wrote a syndicated column for the North American Newspaper Alliance, edited by Frederick. Frederick went on to a long and successful career as a pioneering newswoman.

Baukhage was in Berlin at the start of World War II and covered the early war period from there and from Geneva, Paris, and Lisbon.

Baukhage was at the White House on December 7, 1941, and was one of the first people there to learn of the attack on Pearl Harbor. Baukhage was allowed to set up a microphone in the White House newsroom (this was a breach of usual practice, but besides being Early's friend, Baukhage was a favorite of Roosevelt and generally well-regarded in the business) and was one of the first to broadcast news of the attack.

When the NBC Blue Network was spun off to become ABC in 1942, Baukhage stayed with the new network, remaining there into 1951. From 1942 to 1950, he presented a 15-minute news show at 11:00 AM on weekdays. He also covered the Nuremberg trials.

== Television pioneer ==
Baukhage became one of the first television news anchors (although not called that, as that meaning of "anchor" was not yet extant), when, with Jim Gibbons, he hosted ABC's first evening news program, News and Views, which debuted on August 11, 1948, and ran through March 30, 1951. At this time, relatively few American homes had television receivers.

== Later years ==
After ABC, Baukhage moved to the Mutual Radio Network where he worked in 1952 and 1953. He made some broadcasts for the Armed Forces Radio Network in 1959 and wrote a column for U.S. News & World Report from 1963 to 1967, then retired after a series of strokes. Baukhage died on January 31, 1976.
