= Walter Compton (broadcaster) =

American TV and radio broadcaster (1912–1959)

- Born: Walter Knobeloch; 1912; Charleston, South Carolina, United States
- Died: December 9, 1959 (aged 47); Georgetown, Washington, D.C., United States
- Education: Roanoke College
- Occupations: Broadcasting TV and radio executive; TV news anchor; radio director
- Known for: The Walter Compton News

Walter Compton (1912 – December 9, 1959) was an American TV broadcaster and radio and television broadcasting executive who had an active career in American television and radio from 1936 until his death in 1959 at the age of 47.

== Life and career ==
Born Walter Knobeloch in Charleston, South Carolina, Compton was the son of Aline V. Knobeloch. He graduated from Roanoke College in 1934 and was a member of the faculty at that institution from the Fall of 1934– through the Spring of 1936.

He adopted the name Walter Compton when he began his career in broadcasting in the summer of 1936. From 1937–1945 he was on the staff of WOL radio in Washington D.C; notably hosting the Quiz of Two Cities program in 1942. He was general manager of WAAM-TV in Baltimore from 1946 to 1947, and a charter member of the Radio-Television News Directors Association in 1946.

In 1947–1948 Compton was the anchor of his own television news program The Walter Compton News for the DuMont Television Network; "the first news series on a television network to originate from Washington." He was general manager of WTTV in Washington, D.C. (not Indianapolis) from 1948 to 1953. He then served as general manager and Vice President of the North Dade Video Inc. before working for the Mutual Broadcasting System during the last two years of his life. During his career he was an active member of the Advertising Club of Metropolitan Washington.

He died at Georgetown University Hospital, Georgetown, Washington, D.C., US. on December 9, 1959, at the age of 47. He had three children with his wife Frances.
