= Doorway to Fame =

- Presented by: Johnny Olson; Ned Harvey Orchestra
- Narrated by: Joe Bolton
- Country of origin: United States

Production
- Running time: 30 minutes

Original release
- Network: DuMont
- Release: May 2, 1947 – July 4, 1949

Doorway to Fame is an American talent show broadcast on the now defunct DuMont Television Network. The series ran from May 2, 1947, to July 11, 1949.

== Overview ==
The series used early television scene-blending technology to project the performers into cleverly constructed miniature sets or backdrops. Although 20,000 performers appeared on the series, it is widely reported that, contrary to the show's name, very few of the contestants went on to become famous. The series was cancelled in 1949.

== Broadcast history ==
The series was hosted by Johnny Olson, (Note: The December 11, 1948, issue of Billboard reported that Danton Walker was the master of ceremonies.) who would go on to host the DuMont daytime variety show Johnny Olson's Rumpus Room from 1949 to 1952, and many other television series and game shows, including the Saturday morning children's show Kids and Company on DuMont from September 1951 to June 1952, with co-host Ham Fisher.

Regulars on the program included The Tophatters, described as "instrumentalists and novelty singers".

On May 15, 1948, announcer Joe Bolton left Doorway to Fame to start on WPIX-TV as announcer and weatherman.

The program, produced and distributed by DuMont, originally aired Friday nights at 7:30 pm EST on most DuMont affiliate stations. In October 1947, the schedule was changed to Monday nights at 7:00 pm ET. In March 1949, the program moved to 8:30 pm ET.

== Episode status ==
Two kinescopes of the series survive at the UCLA Film and Television Archive. One of the surviving episodes featured up-and-coming traditional pop singer Toni Arden and African-American "novelty dance act" Cook & Brown along with other performers.

== See also ==
- List of programs broadcast by the DuMont Television Network
- List of surviving DuMont Television Network broadcasts
- 1947-48 United States network television schedule
- 1948-49 United States network television schedule

== Bibliography ==
- David Weinstein, The Forgotten Network: DuMont and the Birth of American Television (Philadelphia: Temple University Press, 2004) ISBN 1-59213-245-6
- Alex McNeil, Total Television, Fourth edition (New York: Penguin Books, 1980) ISBN 0-14-024916-8
- Tim Brooks and Earle Marsh, The Complete Directory to Prime Time Network and Cable TV Shows 1946–Present, Ninth edition (New York: Ballantine Books, 2007) ISBN 978-0-345-49773-4
