= Television news in the United States =

Aspect of news broadcasting

Television news in the United States has undergone significant evolution over the years. It has transformed from a brief 10- to 15-minute evening broadcast into a diverse array of programs and channels. Today, audiences have access to local, regional, and national news coverage through various platforms, available at any time of the day.

== Origin of television news ==
Lowell Thomas hosted the first-ever, regularly scheduled, nightly news broadcast on American television in March 1940; it was a simulcast of his nightly 6:45 PM NBC network radio newscast, with the television broadcast seen only in New York City over what was then experimental TV station W2XBS. The television simulcast lasted for only a few months. In June 1941, W2XBS became pioneering NBC television station WNBT (now WNBC).

The first serious attempt at dedicated television news broadcasts in the United States was by CBS. Upon becoming commercial station WCBW (now WCBS-TV) in 1941, the pioneer New York CBS television station broadcast two daily news programs, at 2:30 and 7:30 p.m. weekdays, most of the newscasts featuring Richard Hubbell reading a script with only occasional cutaways to a map or still photograph.

When Pearl Harbor was bombed on Sunday, December 7, 1941, Ray Forrest, WNBT’s announcer, broke into the broadcast of the movie Millionaire Playboy with news of the attack. According to The Magic Window: American Television, 1939-1953, news of the attack on Pearl Harbor constituted television’s first bulletin and Sam Cuff of WNBT’s Face of the War stood in front of a map showing viewers where the Japanese attacks occurred.

WCBW (which was usually off the air on Sunday to give the engineers a day off), took to the air at 8:45 PM with an extensive special report. The national emergency even broke down the unspoken wall between CBS radio and television. WCBW executives convinced radio announcers and experts such as George Fielding Elliot and Linton Wells to come down to the Grand Central Station studios during the evening and give information and commentary on the attack. The WCBW special report that night lasted less than ninety minutes, but that special broadcast pushed the limits of live television in 1941 and opened up new possibilities for future broadcasts. As CBS wrote in a special report to the FCC, the unscheduled live news broadcast on December 7 “was unquestionably the most stimulating challenge and marked the greatest advance of any single problem faced up to that time.” Additional newscasts were scheduled in the early days of the war.

In May 1942, WCBW (like almost all television stations) sharply cut back its live program schedule and the newscasts were canceled, since the station temporarily suspended studio operations, resorting exclusively to the occasional broadcast of films. This was primarily due to the fact that much of the staff had either joined the service or were redeployed to war related technical research, and to prolong the life of the early, unstable cameras which were now impossible to repair due to the wartime lack of parts. In May, 1944, as the war began to turn in favor of the Allies, WCBW reopened the studios and the newscasts returned, briefly anchored by Ned Calmer, and then by Everett Holles.

After the war, expanded news programs appeared on the WCBW schedule—renamed WCBS-TV in 1946—first anchored by Milo Boulton, and later by Douglas Edwards. On May 3, 1948, Douglas Edwards began anchoring CBS Television News, a regular 15-minute nightly newscast on the rudimentary CBS Television Network, including WCBS-TV. It aired every weeknight at 7:30 PM, and was the first regularly scheduled, network television news program featuring an anchor (as mentioned, the nightly Lowell Thomas NBC radio network newscast was simulcast on television locally on NBC's WNBT—now WNBC—for a time in the early 1940s and the previously mentioned Richard Hubbell, Ned Calmer, Everett Holles and Milo Boulton on WCBW in the early and mid-1940s, but these were local television broadcasts seen only in New York City). The NBC Television Network's regularly scheduled news offering at the time NBC Television Newsreel was simply film with voice narration.

In 1950, the name of the nightly news was changed to Douglas Edwards and the News, and the following year, it became the first news program to be broadcast on both coasts, thanks to a new coaxial cable connection, prompting Edwards to use the greeting "Good evening everyone, coast to coast." The broadcast was renamed the CBS Evening News when Walter Cronkite replaced Edwards in 1962. Edwards remained with CBS News with various daytime television newscasts and radio news broadcasts until his retirement on April 1, 1988.

== History of network news ==
There were irregularly scheduled, quasi-network newscasts originating from NBC's WNBT in New York City and reportedly fed to WPTZ (now KYW-TV) in Philadelphia and WRGB in Schenectady, NY prior to the regularly scheduled NBC Television Newsreel, such as Esso sponsored news features as well as The Face of War and The War As It Happens. In the final days of World War II, irregularly scheduled NBC television news and newsreel programs were broadcast which were also seen in New York, Philadelphia and Schenectady on the relatively few (roughly 5,000) television sets which existed at the time (early to mid 1940s). Shortly after the war, NBC Television Newsreel aired filmed news highlights with narration. Later in 1948, when sponsored by Camel Cigarettes, NBC Television Newsreel was renamed Camel Newsreel Theatre and then, when John Cameron Swayze was added as an on-camera anchor in 1949, the program was renamed Camel News Caravan.

On CBS in 1948, CBS Television News premiered on the network in May with on-camera anchor Douglas Edwards, later retitled Douglas Edwards and the News. CBS Television also featured public affairs programs such as Longines Chronoscope which featured newsworthy public figures, and which ran from June 1951 to April 1955 at 11pm ET.

The DuMont Television Network had The Walter Compton News (June 1947 – 1948), I.N.S. Telenews and Camera Headlines (1948–1949), and DuMont Evening News (September 1954 – 1 April 1955).

However, Edward R. Murrow is widely regarded as the most important figure in the early days of U.S. television news. On his weekly news show See It Now on CBS, Murrow presented live reports from journalists on both the east and west coasts of the United States—the first program with live simultaneous transmission from coast to coast. See It Now focused on a number of controversial issues, but its most memorable moment was a 30-minute special on March 9, 1954, entitled "A Report on Senator Joseph McCarthy," which contributed to the eventual political downfall of the senator.

=== Expansion from 15 to 30 minutes ===
NBC's Camel Newsreel Theatre was later expanded to 15 minutes and renamed Camel News Caravan when John Cameron Swayze was added as an on-camera anchor in 1949. The show was succeeded by the Huntley-Brinkley Report in 1956, featuring a duo-anchor format with Chet Huntley and David Brinkley. On September 9, 1963, the Huntley-Brinkley Report expanded to 30 minutes, following a similar move by CBS. It was renamed NBC Nightly News in 1970, after Huntley's retirement. Initially, NBC Nightly News was presented by two anchors from a rotating group of three: Brinkley, John Chancellor, and Frank McGee. A year later, Chancellor became sole anchor, and Brinkley provided commentaries. (McGee became host of Today.) In 1976, Brinkley rejoined the program as co-anchor. He continued in that role until 1979, when Chancellor resumed anchoring the program solo. Chancellor moved to the role of commentator in 1982 and was succeeded by a team of Tom Brokaw in New York and Roger Mudd in Washington. Brokaw became sole anchor in 1983.

CBS launched CBS Television News in May 1948 to compete against the NBC newsreel programs, hosted on camera by Douglas Edwards, it was renamed Douglas Edwards with the News in 1950. In 1962, Walter Cronkite landed the anchor seat, which he would hold until 1981, and the program's name was changed to CBS Evening News. On September 2, 1963, the show expanded from 15 to 30 minutes. In the 1970s, CBS Evening News was the dominant newscast on American television, and Cronkite was often cited as the "most trusted man in America." After Cronkite's retirement in 1981, Dan Rather became the anchor of CBS Evening News. He was joined by co-anchor Connie Chung from 1993 to 1995.

ABC Evening News began airing in 1953, hosted by John Charles Daly. Daly had been a well-known CBS radio correspondent, though today he is best remembered as the emcee of CBS's long-running game show, What's My Line?, which he hosted while serving as ABC's anchorman. Daly left ABC in 1960 and was succeeded by a frequently expanding list of successors that included John Cameron Swayze, Bill Laurence, Bill Sheehan, Ron Cochran, a young Peter Jennings, and Bob Young. In 1968, Frank Reynolds became anchor of the program, and it soon expanded from 15 minutes to 30 minutes. A year later, Howard K. Smith joined as co-anchor, reporting from Washington. In early 1971, Harry Reasoner left CBS News and replaced Reynolds as the New York anchor. Reasoner became the sole anchor in 1975, and Smith provided commentaries. In 1976, Barbara Walters joined the program as Reasoner's co-anchor in New York, thus becoming the first woman to serve as a regular network news anchor. (Marlene Sanders had previously served as an occasional substitute anchor). Other women who would occasionally appear in daytime and weekend anchor roles in earlier days were Pauline Frederick of ABC and NBC and Nancy Dickerson of NBC. From the early 1970s forward, females such as Lesley Stahl of CBS, Carole Simpson of ABC and Jessica Savitch of NBC began to appear in significant on-camera newscasting roles. Reasoner was very unhappy with the addition of Walters, and the two did not work well together. With Roone Arledge as President of ABC News, the ABC Evening News was rebranded as ABC World News Tonight around 1977 with a trio of anchors: Frank Reynolds, Peter Jennings and Max Robinson. Jennings assumed solo anchor responsibility in 1983 following Reynolds's death.

=== Jennings, Rather, Brokaw era ===
Brokaw, Rather, and Jennings became the familiar faces of network news for more than two decades. But changes began in December 2004, when Brian Williams took over from Brokaw as anchor of NBC Nightly News, after Brokaw's well-anticipated retirement, announced in 2002. Rather also retired from the anchor seat of CBS Evening News in March 2005, albeit quite abruptly, after it was discovered that CBS used documents whose authenticity could not be verified in a report on George W. Bush's Air National Guard record. Jennings stepped away from the network anchor seat as well in April 2005, after he announced that he had lung cancer and would undergo chemotherapy. After the announcement, ABC World News Tonight was hosted by Bob Woodruff and Elizabeth Vargas.

Jennings died in August 2005 and ABC named Vargas and Woodruff as co-anchors of the broadcast in January 2006. Later that month, Woodruff and cameraman Doug Vogt were injured in a roadside bomb attack while on assignment in Iraq. His injuries were so severe, it became apparent he would not return to the anchor chair, although he eventually recovered enough to return as an occasional correspondent. Vargas continued on the broadcast, until May 2006, when she announced she was stepping down and going on maternity leave.

=== Post Jennings, Rather, Brokaw era ===
On May 29, 2006, ABC named Charles Gibson as sole anchor of ABC World News Tonight. Two months later, ABC renamed the program World News with Charles Gibson. In February 2007, the program achieved the number one spot in the Nielsen ratings for nightly news broadcasts, overtaking NBC Nightly News. This was ABC's first victory since the week Peter Jennings died in August 2005, and the first time since 1996. NBC Nightly News subsequently reclaimed the lead. On September 2, 2009, ABC announced that Mr. Gibson would retire from broadcasting at the end of 2009, and then be succeeded by Diane Sawyer. Sawyer in turn would leave the broadcast in 2014, and was replaced by David Muir. As of 2025, the David Muir anchored ABC "World News Tonight" holds the #1 rated spot.

At CBS, Bob Schieffer took over the anchor chair at CBS Evening News on an interim basis. In an effort by CBS to reach a younger audience, Today's Katie Couric was made the new anchorperson. She is the first solo female anchor of a broadcast network's flagship evening newscast. She stepped down in 2011 and was replaced by Scott Pelley. In 2017, it was abruptly announced that Scott Pelley would be leaving CBS Evening News. Anthony Mason acted as interim anchor until Jeff Glor was announced as the new anchor and took over on December 4, 2017. Glor would leave the CBS Evening News in May 2019, with Norah O'Donnell succeeding him as anchor in July of that year. O'Donnell would later leave the CBS Evening News in January 2025, with John Dickerson and Maurice DuBois taking over the anchor role that same month, with CBS retooling the broadcast to move closer to a news magazine format.

Scandal enveloped NBC's Brian Williams after controversy over his accounts from the Iraq War and Hurricane Katrina, causing NBC to suspend Williams for six months starting February 2015. Lester Holt was named the broadcast's interim anchor, and in June of that year, would become the permanent anchor for the NBC Nightly News; Holt is the first African-American to be named as the sole weeknight anchor of a major network news broadcast. Holt would step away from the NBC Nightly News in May 2025, being replaced by Tom Llamas at the beginning of the next month.

== Today's television news ==
Today, electronic news gathering has enabled reporters to capture video and audio at greater ease and edit the footage faster than when film was used. Journalists have also employed microwave and satellite.

Television news programming in the U.S. can be separated into categories: local news, network news, and cable news.

=== Local news ===
Many local broadcast television stations have in-house news departments that produce their own newscasts. The content of the newscasts are geared towards viewers in specific Designated Market Areas in which the stations operate. In other words, the stories have a strong local focus, and are relevant to local lives. National or international stories may also make the top stories but local perspectives/reactions are featured in these stories.

Weather reports also play a very important role in local news as they are found in every local newscast. Compared to national news, local news provides more in-depth, regular and frequent coverage of weather reports relevant to a station's viewing area. Traffic reports are featured especially during weekday morning newscasts. Sports news are also a major regular feature during evening newscasts, especially for local sports teams.

A station typically produces around five to seven hours of local news on weekdays and airs fewer hours on weekends. Some stations focus more on news, currently (as of April, 2025), KTLA in the Greater Los Angeles area offers 73 and 1/2 hours per week in newscasts (Most of any US Broadcast Station). (11.5 hours each weekday, 6.5 hours on Saturdays and 7.5 hours on Sunday). Some stations produce newscasts for other stations. For instance, WPVI in Philadelphia produces a 22.00 newscast of Action News aired on WPHL.

=== National network news ===
Disney Entertainment Television, CBS Entertainment Group, and NBCUniversal Media Group all operate news divisions, named ABC News, CBS News, and NBC News respectively. Their schedules are broadly similar, with minor exceptions.

Early weekday mornings, at 4:00AM Eastern Time, all three air half-hour programs, Good Morning America First Look on ABC, CBS News Mornings on CBS, and Early Today on NBC. Early Today is the highest rated of these programs. Most but not all of the networks' stations across the country air these early morning national newscasts.

Following local news, Good Morning America, CBS Mornings, and the Today show air. As of 2013, Good Morning America is the most watched morning news show in the United States, followed by Today and CBS This Morning. Good Morning America also airs on weekends, as does Weekend Today. CBS This Morning only has a Saturday edition. On Sundays, CBS instead airs CBS News Sunday Morning, a long-running arts and culture anthology. The top stories come in the first few segments of the show but as the minutes pass, the stories presented gradually shift to more lifestyle-oriented and light-hearted ones. These national morning newscasts have cut-ins to local weather and newscasts every half-hour. On weekdays, the shows air at 7:00 in each and every time zone but on weekends, they either air live or with a 1-hour tape delay from the original broadcast in all time zones. ABC's and CBS' morning shows are two hours long, while Today has expanded to four hours. A mix of NBC, CBS, Fox, and The CW stations that air Live with Kelly and Ryan, especially in the east coast, tape-delay the hours preempted by this program.

On Sunday mornings, the networks air political interview programs. Meet the Press (which premiered November 6, 1947 on the NBC television network and is currently the world's longest running television program) leads Face the Nation on CBS, This Week on ABC, and Fox News Sunday on the Fox network.

News briefs, a two-minute segment with a basic rundown of the largest stories of the day, formerly aired much more frequently on all four networks, including primetime. Currently however, the only network newsbreaks are carried by ABC and CBS in the afternoon leading out of their daytime lineups.

In the evenings, ABC World News Tonight with David Muir, CBS Evening News, and NBC Nightly News with Tom Llamas are the networks' flagship news programs. After years of being largely similar, the programs have evolved to their own niches. World News emphasizes "stories relevant to viewer's lives" delivered in Muir's laid back style; the CBS Evening News focuses prominently on business, political, and international stories delivered in a no-nonsense style; and Nightly News takes a middlebrow, folksy approach with a balance of "hard" and "soft" stories. All three shows air seven nights a week, but their titular hosts only appear on weeknights unless there is major breaking news during weekends. On weekdays, the evening newscasts air at 6:30 in most Eastern Time Zone and Los Angeles stations and 5:30 local time in most other time zones.

During primetime, all three networks air newsmagazine programs. ABC airs 20/20 Fridays at 10PM and Primetime Wednesdays at 10PM. 20/20 often airs 2 hour editions beginning at 9PM and Primetime is often expanded to multiple airings per week to fill holes in the schedule. Dateline NBC currently airs Tuesdays and Saturdays at 8PM on NBC, but like ABC's programs frequently switches, adds, and drops timeslots to fill primetime. 60 Minutes is the most popular of these programs, and also the most respected journalistically, but they rarely directly compete with one another.

On late weeknights, ABC aired Nightline at 11:30 PM for many years. The program is now seen at 12:35 a.m.. From 2 to 8 AM, CBS offers CBS News Roundup, a program consisting of repeats of features from other CBS News programs, interspersed with new news, weather, and sports updates. Few affiliates air the entire broadcast, but most air a substantial portion of it. ABC airs its eclectic World News Now from 2AM to 3:30AM, and many affiliates repeat a portion of it to fill time until America This Morning. NBC airs a repeat of the fourth hour of Today and talk show encores in these time periods.

Unlike ABC, CBS and NBC, Fox does not air national news programs or newsmagazines on weekdays. On Sundays it airs Fox News Sunday, produced by its sister channel Fox News. Fox does provide coverage of breaking news of major events such as presidential debates.

=== Cable news ===
The advent of cable television in the United States led to the eventual birth of cable news. On June 1, 1980, Ted Turner launched CNN, the first 24-hour cable news operation, and sister channel Headline News followed in 1982. CNN gained reputation significantly with its 1991 coverage of the Gulf War. The success of CNN inspired many other 24-hour cable news stations. In 1996, Fox News and MSNBC were launched to compete with CNN.

In 1981, the Financial News Network was launched, with a focus on finance and business news. CNBC was launched in 1989, and bought FNN in 1991. Bloomberg Television was launched in 1994, CNNfn in 1995, and Fox Business Network in 2007.

Regional cable news operations, such as New England Cable News, NY1, and Pittsburgh Cable News Channel, have also gained prominence among regional viewers.

The programming styles vary among these cable news channels, but often feature morning shows, along with blocks of rolling news coverage hosted by various personalities throughout the day. During the evening and primetime hours on weekdays, most cable news networks devote their lineups to opinion-based news and interview programs hosted by pundits. Most U.S. cable news networks do not provide live programming during the overnight hours aside from short updates at the top of the hour, electing to air repeats of their evening programming instead. Some networks may source late-night programming from a sister international news service, such as CNN International for CNN.

An increasing trend, especially in recent years is that cable networks have become more opinion-driven during the daytime. Fewer stories are covered but are reported with greater depth and opinion. Panelists representing both sides of an issue appear during most newscasts to discuss them, especially on issues of a political nature. Cable news networks also increasingly utilize newspaper reporters, particularly those affiliated with the New York Times and Washington Post to provide more details and offer their insights on top political stories. Since the 21st century, more explicitly ideological channels have arisen; in 2000, the left-wing nonprofit Free Speech TV took its modern form, while later entries included four conservative for-profit channels (Blaze TV, i24, OAN, Newsmax TV) and the alt-right InfoWars.

== Current development ==
=== Internet ===
As the Internet becomes more prevalent in American lives, television news operations learn to adapt and embrace new technologies. Today, most television news operations would publish the text of the stories aired during their newscasts on their websites. Some of them, including all the network and national cable news operations, post videos of the stories for visitors to their websites. Most stations now offer a livestream of their local newscasts on their websites or mobile apps. This makes it possible for viewers outside a local station's viewing area to see its newscasts. However some footage, notably sport footage, may be blocked from the livestream for rights reasons. Broadcast networks also offer their evening newscasts on their website and/or as a podcast. Cable networks provide livestreams of their channels as well as reruns of some of their programmes through their websites and mobile apps but access to those channels is restricted to viewers with an existing cable/satellite subscription that includes the channels in question.

Some anchors, reporters, and notable news programs also have blogs that take viewers behind the scenes of their news operation or provide a forum for either the personalities or viewers to air their opinions. In recent years, these news outlets have also provided an avenue for amateurs with digital or mobile phone cameras to send video created by them to be used in the broadcast and website.

Television journalists are acquiring skills for the convergence between television and the Internet. Social media has also become a fixture on the news as most networks, news programmes and key personalities maintain Facebook and Twitter accounts to let viewers get late breaking news, find out what's going on behind the scenes, as well as give comments and questions.

=== Production and Newsgathering ===
Technological advancement is also changing the ways news is gathered and edited. The newsreel days are long gone. Reporters do not use film anymore. Television journalists are capturing images and sound on video and DV. Some stations even begin gathering and reporting news in high-definition television. Even editing and archiving systems are evolving, as more and more stations convert to non-linear editing systems, and storing file footage on computer servers rather than tapes.

With digital cable comes on-demand news programming. News operations slowly begin to feel the burden to generate news content on a 24-hour news cycle, while keeping material fresh on their regularly scheduled newscasts. This means around-the-clock coverage. Rather than having a certain deadline for scheduled newscasts to meet, reporters have to file stories as fast as they can. Producers, on the other hand, have to find more ways to keep news stories "fresh" to the viewers.

== Formats ==
Over the years, television news in the U.S. has evolved into a variety of formats. Local news and network news, once similar in having slow paces and low story counts, are now quite different in styles and tunes.

=== Traditional ===
In the early days, local newscasts were seen more as a public service. The style was straightforward. A newscast was divided into three "blocks": news, sports, and weather. The news block was divided into national, international, and local stories. These newscasts usually had a solo anchor, with others announcing sports and weather as well. The stories aired were generally not covering controversial or upsetting conflicts because the main purpose was to attract a wide audience in order to sell expensive commercial air time. This format is retained by some stations, though usually in smaller markets or higher education broadcasting training departments where there are not an abundance of everyday news stories.

=== Eyewitness News ===
In the late 1960s, Westinghouse Broadcasting, a division of Westinghouse Electric Corporation, devised a new format of local news called "Eyewitness News". Reporters were hired to go out of the newsroom, become "eyewitnesses" of news stories, and record them on film. Later, these reporters were also asked to join the anchors in the studio to talk about the stories.

Al Primo created the format, which was first used on KYW-TV in Philadelphia. In 1968, Primo brought the format to WABC-TV in New York. The "Eyewitness News" format helped to introduce different anchor combinations to local newscasts. The format quickly became popular and was imitated by stations across the country.

Today, most television news operations in the United States utilize some variation of the "Eyewitness News" format.

=== Action News ===
"Action News" was introduced in 1970 by WPVI-TV in Philadelphia to compete against the "Eyewitness News" format at rival station KYW-TV. This format features short stories, high story counts, and a strong focus on spot news. It was called "Action News" because it produced a fast-paced style of newscast. Mel Kampmann of WPVI and Irv Weinstein of WKBW-TV in Buffalo, both owned by Capital Cities Communications, are credited with developing the key tenets of the "Action News" format. On May 11, 1977, Jim Gardner took over as solo anchor of the 6 PM and 11 PM newscasts at WPVI-TV until his retirement in 2022, and along with the theme song Move Closer to Your World, would define the Action News format for decades.

=== Breaking news ===
Formerly referred to as "news bulletins," "breaking news" refers to any news of sufficient importance to warrant an interruption of regularly scheduled programming.

On a national network, programming interruptions are restricted to extremely urgent news. On the other hand, such breaks are now common on 24-hour news channels which often have an anchor available for live interruption at any time. However, in recent times, a 'breaking news' banner has been used more frequently on cable news networks to often refer to a programme's lead story.

=== Franchise news ===
"Franchise news" is a variation of Eyewitness News. Some stations decide to brand their news with slogans such as "News you can use," "Coverage you can count on," or "On your side." The newscasts at these stations tend to focus more on franchises—stories that cover a topic important to local viewers. The most successful franchises are health and consumer news. Other franchises include parenting, pets, the environment, and crime fighting.

Almost every news operation uses some franchises, but a few stations build their news identities around these topical stories.

=== News during sweeps ===
During "sweeps," newscasts often feature stories that are more sensationalized, in order to attract more viewers. Some stations save highly controversial investigative stories covered earlier for airing during sweeps.

News departments at television stations work closely with promotions departments during sweeps to create promotional spots throughout the day that will entice viewers to tune into the newscasts.

== See also ==
- Big Three television networks
- Cable television in the United States
- Communications in the United States
- Fourth television network
- High-definition television in the United States
- History of journalism in the United States
- List of television stations in the United States
- List of United States cable and satellite television networks
- List of United States over-the-air television networks
- List of United States television markets
- Satellite television in the United States
- Television in the United States
- United States cable news
- Category:24-hour television news channels in the United States
