= Campus Hoopla =

1946–47 American TV game show

- Genre: Game show, Sport
- Country of origin: United States

Production
- Running time: 30 minutes

Original release
- Network: NBC
- Release: December 27, 1946 – December 12, 1947

Campus Hoopla is an American game show that ran on the NBC Television network from December 27, 1946, until it ended on December 12, 1947.

== Format ==
The show was centered on a group of teenagers ("complete with 'cheerleaders' and 'students'") in a soda shop. Episodes included up-to-date sports scores and film footage from recent games. It began as a half-hour program but "after several months" was cut to 15 minutes.

== Cast ==
- Lou Little - Host
- Bob Stanton - Sports Reporter
- Eva Marie Saint - Commercial Spokeswoman
- Jack Kilty and Anne Crowley - Song-and-dance act

Long Island University basketball coach and author Clair Bee was also featured on the program.

== Production ==
Campus Hoopla originated from WNBT-TV. Owen Davis Jr., Ernie Colling, and Ken Young were producers.

== Episode status ==
Episode segments of live TV broadcasts (video and audio) of Campus Hoopla dating from 1947 exist in the Hubert Chain Collection of the earliest kinescopes still in existence, as preserved in the Library of Congress (Moving Image Collection). Audio recordings of live TV broadcasts of this show are also on file at the Library of Congress from the 1946–47 period, as recorded from WNBT-TV.

== Sponsor ==
Eva Marie Saint, the cheerleader who did live Keds sneakers commercials on this program, also talks about her performance on this early TV show along with photos in 1947 and 1949 issues of Life magazine. The show was sponsored by U.S. Rubber (makers of Keds). U. S. Rubber ended its sponsorship for the summer of 1947, leaving the program sustaining during that period.

== Critical response ==
A review of Campus Hoopla in the trade publication Variety described the program as "good entertainment, running smoothly and offering the right kind of fresh, young divertissement."

== See also ==
- 1947-48 United States network television schedule
