= Highway to the Stars =

Early TV soap opera

- Genre: Soap opera
- Written by: Bob Wald
- Starring: Patricia Jones
- Country of origin: United States
- Original language: English

Production
- Running time: 30 minutes

Original release
- Network: DuMont
- Release: August 1947 – October 1947

Highway to the Stars is an early American live television soap opera, which was broadcast on New York City station WABD, flagship station of the DuMont Television Network, from August to October 1947, at which point it was replaced with Look Upon a Star, itself eventually replaced with Camera Headlines in January 1948.

Patricia Jones played the lead role, and also starred in the NBC series Martin Kane, Private Eye (1951). Highway to the Stars aired on Tuesdays at 7:30pm ET, not Thursdays as stated in Billboard. Like many other local series on WABD, it may have been considered eligible to be picked up as a network series.

== Premise ==
The premise was described by Billboard as "the travails of a corn-bred gal warbler [singer] trying to make good in the big town".

== Episode status ==
As with most DuMont series, no episodes are known to exist. Methods to record live television, such as kinescopes were only just becoming available by the time the series ended. The network probably thought there was no need to record the series in the first place, given that it aired on a single station only, though a couple kinescopes do remain of WABD's local programming of the following year (1948).

== See also ==
- List of programs broadcast by the DuMont Television Network
- List of surviving DuMont Television Network broadcasts
- 1947-48 United States network television schedule
- Faraway Hill (1946) another early DuMont soap opera

== Bibliography ==
- David Weinstein, The Forgotten Network: DuMont and the Birth of American Television (Philadelphia: Temple University Press, 2004) ISBN 1-59213-245-6
- Alex McNeil, Total Television, Fourth edition (New York: Penguin Books, 1980) ISBN 0-14-024916-8
- Tim Brooks and Earle Marsh, The Complete Directory to Prime Time Network TV Shows, Third edition (New York: Ballantine Books, 1964) ISBN 0-345-31864-1
