= The Swift Show =

- Presented by: Lanny Ross
- Country of origin: United States

Production
- Running time: 30 minutes

Original release
- Network: NBC
- Release: April 1, 1948 – 1949

The Swift Show is an American variety/game show that aired on Thursdays at 8:30pm EST on NBC premiering April 1, 1948 and running to 1949.

== Overview ==
The series, sponsored by the Swift & Company meat packing company, was mainly a musical variety show hosted by Lanny Ross, although during its first few months, it also featured a quiz show segment. Guest stars included Eileen Barton, Frank Fontaine, Max Showalter, and Susan Shaw.

For the first five months, a quiz show segment was included. In September 1948, the show became "Lanny's penthouse with his girlfriend Eileen Barton visiting". In March 1949, the show reverted to a purely musical variety show.

== Episode status ==
Two episodes, from May 13, 1948 and May 27, 1948, are in the collection of the UCLA Film and Television Archive, and an episode from March 31, 1949 is in the collection of the Paley Center for Media.

== See also ==
- 1948-49 United States network television schedule
- The Swift Home Service Club
