= Americana (game show) =

- Genre: Game show
- Created by: Martin Stone/NBC Television
- Written by: Jerome Coopersmith
- Presented by: John Mason Brown (1947–1948); Deems Taylor (1948); Ben Grauer (1948–1949); with Vivian Ferrer (1949)
- Narrated by: Dick Dudley; Hugh James
- Country of origin: United States
- Original language: English

Production
- Running time: 24 minutes
- Production companies: Martin Stone Productions; NBC Productions

Original release
- Network: NBC
- Release: December 8, 1947 – July 4, 1949

Americana is a weekly game show which ran on NBC from December 8, 1947, to July 4, 1949.

== Format and schedule ==
The quiz, whose slogan was "Your program about your country", involved five contestants (originally adults, changed to high school students by March 1949) answering viewer-submitted questions about American history. A panel of three actors would perform short skits (with either one actor or more in each), after which the contestants would try to answer the questions.

A set of the Encyclopedia Americana went to the person who submitted "the most interesting question of the week".

The 30-minute show aired Mondays at 8:10 pm ET in December 1947, at 8 pm ET from January 1948 into April 1948, at 8:30 ET from April 1948 through November 1948, and at 9:30 ET from December 1948 until its end.

Firestone was a sponsor of the program.

== Hosts ==
The series was originally hosted by literary critic John Mason Brown. On January 21, 1948, Brown was replaced by composer and musical critic Deems Taylor, who only hosted that show and the January 28 episode. On February 4 he was replaced by Ben Grauer, who was at the time recognized for hosting Information Please on NBC Radio since 1938.

In 1949, Vivian Ferrer joined Grauer as co-host, likely remaining with the series through its end.

== Reception ==
A review of the program's initial episode in The New York Times described it as "a spirited and intelligent quiz show". Reviewer Jack Gould commended host Brown and the members of the panel: Millicent Fenwick of Vogue magazine, publisher Bennett Cerf, book critic Lewis Gannett, and 11-year-old Lind Nissen. Gould found what he called "minor defects" in some aspects of production, noting that those might easily be corrected for future episodes.

== Episode status ==
Americana was one of the first victims of wiping, a process that was continued by three of the four networks on the air at the time (DuMont rarely disposed of any material) through the late 1970s.

The March 14, 1949, episode is held by the UCLA Film and Television Archive. Michael Keane, Dan Roberts, and Oscar Brand were the actors; Elliott Mendelson, Vivian Frost, Elizabeth Mulligan, Joan Moran, and Michael Drake were the contestants. Vivian Ferrer is not mentioned as co-host, implying that she had not been hired at this point.

The surviving episode has been confirmed to be the second-oldest television game show episode known to exist, the oldest being from the mid-1947 game Party Line hosted by Bert Parks (which is held on kinescope at the Library of Congress).

== See also ==
- 1947–48 United States network television schedule
- 1948–49 United States network television schedule
