= Max Showalter =

American actor (1917–2000)

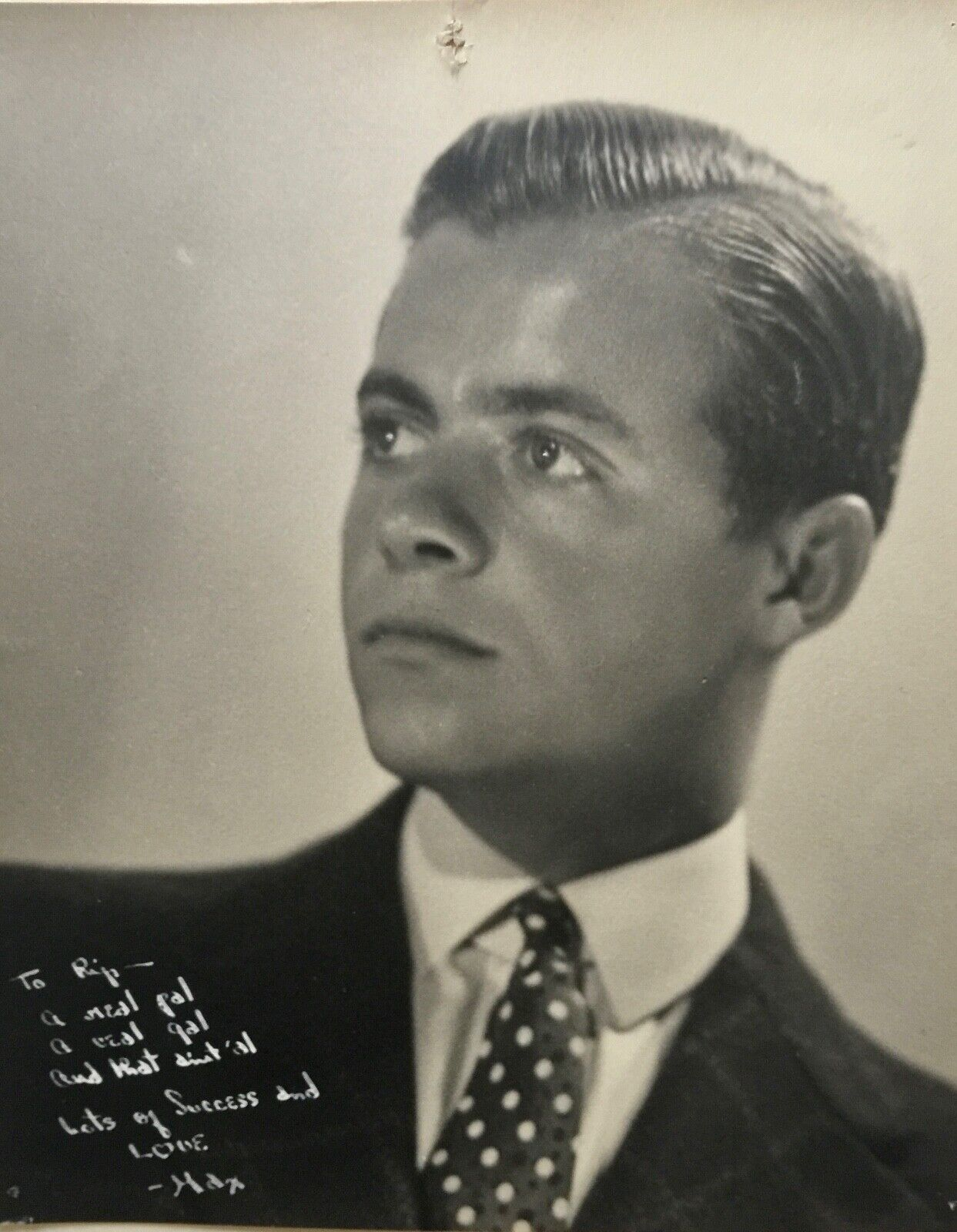
- Showalter in 1938
- Born: Max Gordon Showalter; June 2, 1917; Caldwell, Kansas, U.S.
- Died: July 30, 2000 (aged 83); Middletown, Connecticut, U.S.
- Other name: Casey Adams
- Occupations: Actor; composer; pianist; singer
- Years active: 1935–1984

Max Gordon Showalter (June 2, 1917 – July 30, 2000), sometimes credited as Casey Adams, was an American film, television, and stage actor, as well as a composer, pianist, and singer. He appeared on more than 1,000 television programs. One of Showalter's memorable roles was as the husband of Jean Peters' character in the 1953 film Niagara.

== Early life ==
Showalter was born in Caldwell, Kansas, the son of Elma Roxanna (Dodson) Showalter (1889–1953), a music teacher, and Ira Edward Showalter (1887–1953), who worked in the oil industry and was also a banker and farmer. As a toddler, he developed a desire for acting while accompanying his mother to local theatres where she played piano for silent movies. He served in the U.S. Army during World War II as an entertainer with the Special Services division.

== Stage ==
By the late 1930s, Showalter had multiple stage roles under his belt, including acting in productions of the Pasadena Playhouse. He soon made his Broadway debut in Knights of Song. Showalter also appeared in the traveling musical This Is the Army for two years and in other notable Broadway productions like Make Mine Manhattan and The Grass Harp. His most memorable stage role was as Horace Vandergelder in the Broadway show Hello Dolly!. Showalter performed the role more than 3,000 times opposite Carol Channing, Betty Grable, and Ethel Merman.

== Motion pictures and television ==
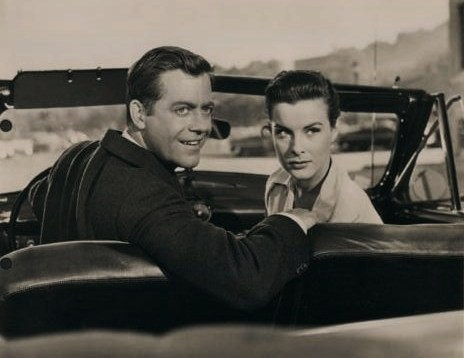
Showalter as Ray Cutler alongside Jean Peters, who plays his on-screen wife, Polly, in Niagara (1953)

In the late 1940s, Showalter was signed to 20th Century Fox as a featured contract player. His name was changed by Fox's founder, Darryl F. Zanuck, to the more "bankable" Casey Adams.

He made his feature film debut in Always Leave Them Laughing (1949). He first appeared on live television in the musical variety series The Swift Show (1948–49), also known as The Lanny Ross Show.

Showalter's second feature film was the biopic With a Song in My Heart (1952), where he had a small role as a vaudeville performer. In the film, Showalter, along with David Wayne, sang the song "Hoe that Corn", which he also wrote. He appeared in Niagara (1953) alongside Marilyn Monroe and Joseph Cotten. He made a cameo as a Life magazine photographer in another Monroe movie, Bus Stop, in 1956.

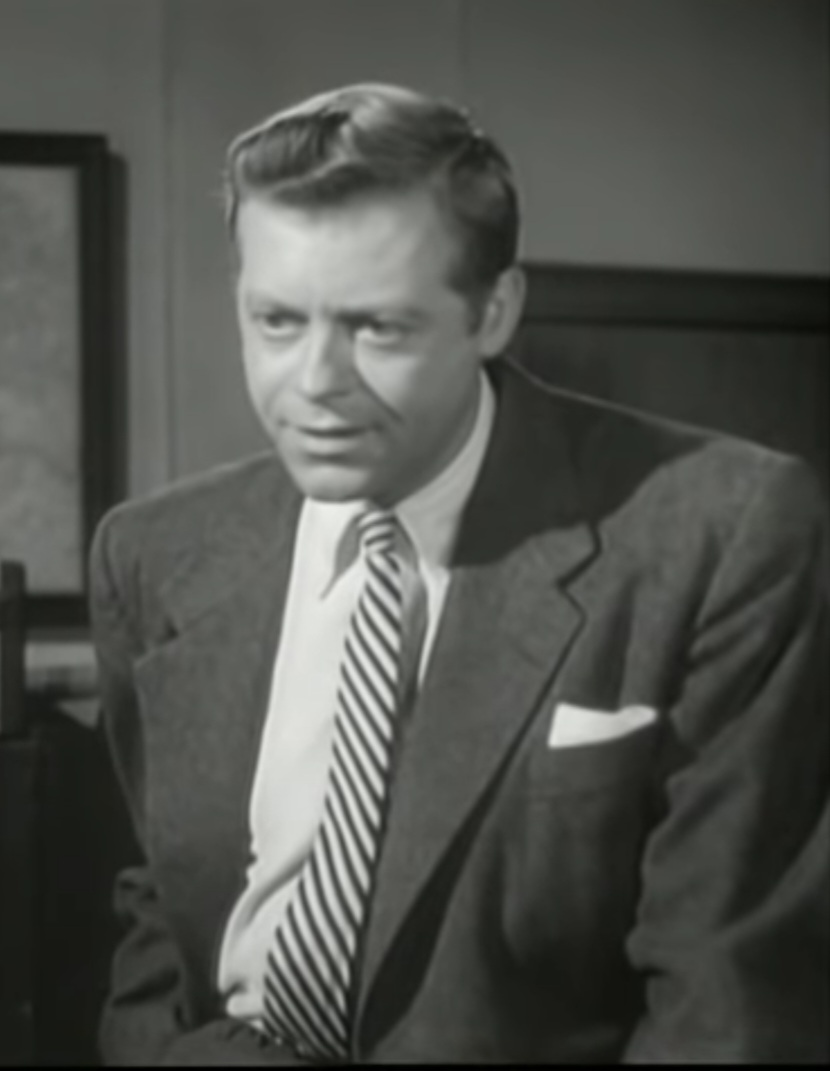
Max Showalter in Indestructible Man (1956)

During the 1950s, Showalter appeared in television shows like The Loretta Young Show and Navy Log, in addition to films like Vicki (1953), Down Three Dark Streets (1954), Naked Alibi (1954), Indestructible Man (1956) and Gunsmoke (1957) as "Barney Wales", the new husband of the title character "Mavis McCloud" (S3E7).

The following year, billed as Casey Adams, he appeared as Ward Cleaver in "It's a Small World", the original pilot for the sitcom Leave It to Beaver. The pilot was broadcast as an episode of the Studio 57 anthology series. He was replaced by Hugh Beaumont for the television series. Casey Adams also appeared in The Andy Griffith Show as antiques dealer Ralph Mason in the episode titled "The Horse Trader."

In the 1960s, Showalter reclaimed his original name and continued to land roles in such films as Elmer Gantry (1960), The Music Man (1962), and How to Murder Your Wife (1965). He made six appearances on Perry Mason, including the role of Carl Reynolds in the 1958 episode "The Case of the Curious Bride," murder victim Burt Stokes in "The Case of the Wandering Widow" in 1960, and Talbot Sparr in the 1964 episode "The Case of the Ugly Duckling." He made appearances in other television series like The Twilight Zone (as piano player Pat Riley in S3 E8 1961 "It's a Good Life"), The Lucy Show, Gunsmoke, The Many Loves of Dobie Gillis, The New Phil Silvers Show, Bewitched, Dr. Kildare, Surfside 6, The Doris Day Show, Kojak, Police Story, The Bob Newhart Show, as well as the films, Lord Love a Duck, The Anderson Tapes and Sgt. Pepper's Lonely Hearts Club Band. In the 1979 film 10, he played a pastor whose hobby was writing (bad) songs. He was also a regular cast member in the 1980 TV series The Stockard Channing Show. Showalter made his last onscreen appearance in the John Hughes film Sixteen Candles (1984).

== Composing ==
Showalter composed the music for Little Boy Blue, which opened at the El Capitan Theater in Hollywood, California, on September 11, 1950. He also wrote the musical Go for Your Gun, which premiered in Manchester, England, in 1963.

== Recording ==
In 1956, Showalter (as Casey Adams) recorded an album of his own music, Casey Adams Plays and Sings Max Showalter Songs (Foremost Records FML-1004). He was one of the artists featured on The Secret Garden, a 1988 CBS Special Products album containing performances of music from the musical of that title that "has played the repertory circuit in England."

In the 1979 film 10, he parodies himself by portraying a church minister who fancies himself a songwriter, singing and playing a mediocre song he wrote, with George (Dudley Moore) as his amused audience.

== Painting ==
Show business columnist Hedda Hopper reported in a 1963 newspaper column that Showalter had sold 139 paintings and would have his first one-man show.

== Later years ==
In 1984, Showalter retired from acting and moved to an 18th-century farmhouse in Chester, Connecticut, near the area where he acted in the film It Happened to Jane (1959). Showalter became involved in local musical theatre, including the Ivoryton Playhouse, and went on to produce, direct, write, and narrate the Christmas musical Touch of a Child. He spent much of his free time painting oil miniatures. Showalter was a good friend of actress Katharine Hepburn, who lived in nearby Old Saybrook, Connecticut.

== Personal life ==
In the 1950s, Showalter took a hiatus from his work in Hollywood, returning to Caldwell, Kansas, to care for his 15-year-old sister who was orphaned by the death of their parents in an automobile accident. Their deaths followed the death of Showalter's brother, Robert, in a car wreck two years earlier. After several years he returned to Hollywood and resumed his career.

== Death ==
On July 30, 2000, Showalter died of cancer in Middletown, Connecticut. He was 83 years old.

== Filmography ==
- Always Leave Them Laughing (1949) as Comet Pen Salesman
- With a Song in My Heart (1952) as Harry Guild
- What Price Glory? (1952) as Lt. Moore
- My Wife's Best Friend (1952) as Pete Bentham
- Stars and Stripes Forever (1952) as Narrator (voice, uncredited)
- Niagara (1953) as Ray Cutler
- Destination Gobi (1953) as Walter Landers
- Vicki (1953) as Larry Evans
- Dangerous Crossing (1953) as Jim Logan
- Night People (1954) as Frederick S. Hobart
- Down Three Dark Streets (1954) as Dave Millson
- Naked Alibi (1954) as Det. Lt. Fred Parks
- The Return of Jack Slade (1955) as Billy Wilcox
- Never Say Goodbye (1956) as Andy Leonard
- Indestructible Man (1956) as Police Lt. Dick Chasen
- Somebody Up There Likes Me (1956) (uncredited)
- Bus Stop (1956) as Life Magazine Reporter
- Dragoon Wells Massacre (1957) as Phillip Scott
- Designing Woman (1957) as musical director (uncredited)
- The Monster That Challenged the World (1957) as Dr. Tad Johns
- Hellcats of the Navy (1957) (uncredited)
- The Female Animal (1958) as Charlie Grant
- The Naked and the Dead (1958) as Col. Dalleson
- Voice in the Mirror (1958) as Don Martin

- It Happened to Jane (1959) as Selwyn Harris
- Elmer Gantry (1960) as Deaf Man (uncredited)
- Return to Peyton Place (1961) as Nick Parker (uncredited)
- Claudelle Inglish (1961) as Young Parson (uncredited)
- Summer and Smoke (1961) as Roger Doremus
- Bon Voyage! (1962) as The Tight Suit
- The Music Man (1962) as Salesman on the Train (uncredited)
- Smog (1962) as Paul Prescott
- My Six Loves (1963) as B.J. Smith
- Move Over, Darling (1963) as Hotel Desk Clerk
- Mr. and Mrs. (1964) as Walter
- Fate Is the Hunter (1964) as Dan Crawford
- Sex and the Single Girl (1964) as Holmes
- How to Murder Your Wife (1965) as Tobey Rawlins
- Lord Love a Duck (1966) as Howard Greene
- A Talent for Loving (1969) as Franklin
- The Moonshine War (1970) as Mr. Worthman
- The Anderson Tapes (1971) as Bingham
- Bonnie's Kids (1972) as Frank
- Sgt. Pepper's Lonely Hearts Club Band (1978) as Ernest Shears
- 10 (1979) as Reverend
- Racing with the Moon (1984) as Mr. Arthur, Piano Teacher
- Sixteen Candles (1984) as Fred (final film role)

=== Television ===
- The Swift Show (1948–1949) as Regular (1949)
- TV Reader's Digest (1 episode, 1954)
- The Loretta Young Show (4 episodes, 1954–1955)
- The Return of Jack Slade (1955)
- The 20th Century Fox Hour (1 episode, 1956) as Barry
- Navy Log (1 episode, 1956) as Lieutenant Sloane
- Matinee Theatre (1 episode, 1956)
- Star Stage (1 episode, 1956) as Pete
- The Gale Storm Show (1956) as Orchestra Leader
- Crossroads (1 episode, 1956) as Deavers / Bannister
- Hawkeye and the Last of the Mohicans (1 episode, 1957) as Capt. John West
- Leave It to Beaver (1 episode, 1957) as Ward Cleaver
- Code 3 (1 episode, 1957)
- Gunsmoke (1 episode, 1957) as Barney Wales
- Mr. Adams and Eve (1 episode, 1958) as Dovey
- General Electric Theater (2 episode, 1959–1962) as Joe Malone / Will Henderson
- The Thin Man (1 episode, 1959) as Paul Cameron
- The David Niven Show (1 episode, 1959) as Big Guy
- The Andy Griffith Show (1 episode, 1961) as Ralph Mason
- Stagecoach West (1 episode, 1961) as David Harkness
- Follow the Sun (1 episode, 1961) as Don Hinkley

- The Twilight Zone (1 episode, 1961) as Pat Riley
- Surfside 6 (1 episode, 1962) as Ned Martin
- Sam Benedict (1 episode, 1963) as John Buchanan
- Dr. Kildare (2 episodes, 1962–1964) as Rulon Murphy / Ben Ballard
- Hazel (3 episodes, 1963-1964) as Mr. Blackpool; Mr. Starkey; Mr. Berry.
- The New Phil Silvers Show (1 episode, 1963) as Frank
- The Lucy Show (1 episode, 1964) as Vinnie / Vinnie Meyers
- Perry Mason (6 episodes, 1958–1965) as Charles Judd / Talbot Sparr / Clarence Henry / Frank Logan / Burt Stokes / Carl Reynolds
- Bewitched (1 episode, 1965) as Charles Barlow
- The Doris Day Show (1 episode, 1969) as Greg Fletcher
- Police Story (1 episode, 1975) as Attorney John Barron
- How to Succeed in Business Without Really Trying (1975) as J. B. Biggley
- Kojak (1 episode, 1975) as Quinlan
- The Bob Newhart Show (1 episode, 1977) as Dr. Morgan
- Quincy M.E. (1 episode, 1978) as Dr. Milton Gold
- The Stockard Channing Show (11 episodes, 1980) as Gus Clyde
- The Incredible Hulk (1 episodes, 1980) as Walter Gamble
- The Love Boat (2 episodes, 1982–1983) as Jarvis Holden / Herman Baker
