= America Song =

American TV variety series (1948–1949)

America Song is a live television series which aired on NBC during prime time, premiering on April 21, 1948, and ending on April 25, 1949. In its final four months, the program's title was American Songs.

Hosted by Paul Arnold, the program presented performances of United States folk music with Nellie Fisher (who also choreographed dances) and Ray Harrison as featured dancers. Each episode was 20 minutes long.

America Song was produced by Fred Coe and directed by Ira Skutch. Its competition included Kiernan's Corner on ABC and newscasts on CBS and DuMont.

A review of the June 16, 1948, episode in the trade publication Billboard described America Song as "a simple, unassuming television program, but one which is completely satisfying".

== See also ==
- 1948-49 United States network television schedule
