= The Swift Home Service Club =

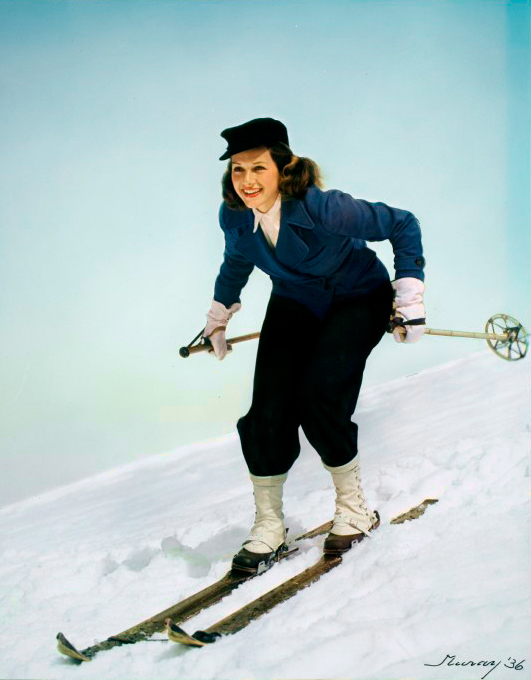
Jinx Falkenburg on the cover of McCall's magazine

Swift Home Service Club is a 1947-1948 American television show, "credited with being the first sponsored daytime network TV show." Hosted by Tex McCrary and Jinx Falkenburg, it aired Monday through Friday at 1 p.m. ET.

== Broadcast history ==
The show launched on NBC Television in May 1947, Mondays through Fridays at 1 p.m. ET. It started shortly after a previous show hosted by McCrary and Falkenburg, Bristol-Myers Tele-Varieties which debuted on the NBC network on January 5, 1947, and aired Sunday evenings from 8:15pm to 8:30 p.m. ET.

== Format ==
Described as "a new daytime TV show that blended the homemaker, fashion, and talk shows", The Swift Home Service Club featured homemaker tips and interviews, with topics such as interior decorating, kitchen ideas, and cooking. Audience participation contests with guest judges were also included.

== Personnel ==
In addition to Falkenberg and McCrary, regulars on the program included Sandra Gahle, Martha Logan, and Helen Carroll and the Escorts. Dan Seymour was the announcer. Lee Cooley was the producer, and Tom Hutchinson was the director.

== Review ==
A review in the June 1, 1947, issue of Sponsor magazine pointed out several flaws in one episode:

There can't be any question of the fact that Jinx Falkenberg is telegenic, but there also isn't any question but that she hadn't the slightest idea of what to do next on this show. Tex McCrary, the male half of the Jinx and Tex team, would have looked better with a hair cut and an established character ... Sandra Gahle, the interior decorator on the program, should look to her corseting, and the hat designer, Walter Florell, should realize that the television camera is not a mirror in which he's looking at himself and striking poses.

== Preservation status ==
This show has one of the oldest live television episodes preserved, with a kinescope of a 1947 transmission in the collection of the Library of Congress. This program is also credited as one of the first television programs with a sustaining sponsor: Swift and Company, the meat and food products company. The series lasted only one season.

According to Library of Congress and concurrent press sources, the program debuted in May 1947 at 1pm ET. There is a 3-minute segment of a live broadcast captured on early kinescope in the Library of Congress archives as part of the Hubert Chain collection from October 31, 1947, one of the earliest surviving recordings of live television. This program, one of several concurrent programs on NBC telecast from NYC's WNBT-TV, may be the first NBC network daytime show, shown in only two markets originally.

== See also ==
- The Swift Show
- 1947–48 United States network television schedule (weekday)
