= Bill Slater (broadcaster) =

American broadcaster (1902–1965)

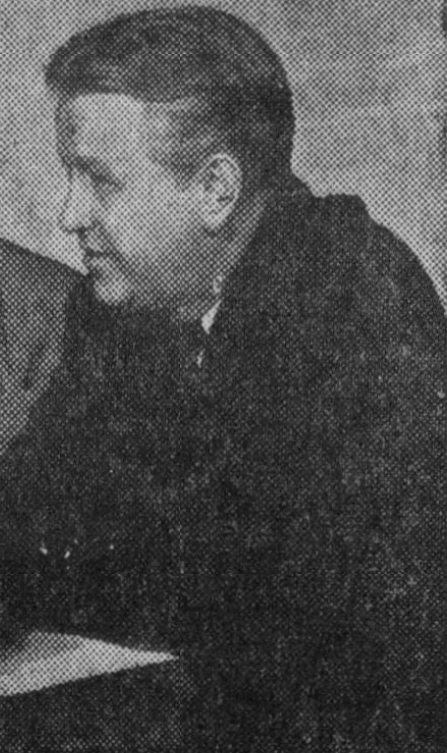
- Slater in a 1944 publication
- Born: William Ernest Slater; December 3, 1902; Parkersburg, West Virginia, U.S.
- Died: January 25, 1965 (aged 62); New Rochelle, New York, U.S.
- Burial place: Cypress Hills Cemetery
- Occupations: Educator, announcer
- Relatives: Michael Hawkins (nephew); Christian Slater (great-nephew)

William Ernest Slater (December 3, 1902 – January 25, 1965) was an American military officer, educator, sports announcer, and radio/television personality from the 1920s through the 1950s, hosting the radio shows Twenty Questions and Luncheon at Sardi's. He was the great-uncle of actor Christian Slater.

== Early and personal life ==
Born William Ernest Slater, December 3, 1902, in Parkersburg, West Virginia, he married twice. His first wife was Rebecca; his second wife, Marian, who sometimes accompanied him on the Luncheon at Sardi's radio show. They moved to Larchmont, New York in 1952.

Slater earned a master's degree in political science from Columbia University and was a 1924 graduate of West Point. He subsequently taught English and math in Parkersburg.

Slater joined the Greenbrier Military School in Lewisburg, West Virginia as a commandant. He was a faculty member of the New York Military Academy, where he also coached football. He was then head of the math department and football coach at Blake School in Minneapolis, Minnesota. He left Blake School in 1933 to begin his final teaching post, as headmaster of Adelphi Academy in Brooklyn, New York (1933–1942).

Slater died on January 25 1965, aged 62, in New Rochelle, New York after a long battle with Parkinson's disease. He was buried at Cypress Hills Cemetery. His younger brother Tom was also a sports broadcaster and followed him as the host of Luncheon at Sardi's. Tom Slater's son was actor Michael Hawkins and his grandson is actor Christian Slater.

== Career ==
While teaching at the Blake School for Boys in Minneapolis, it was suggested by a student, whose father was a radio executive, that Slater had the voice and knowledge to be a sports announcer. His first network break came while at Adelphi Academy, when NBC network officials heard him calling the 1933 Army-Navy football game on CBS with Ted Husing, whose voice was similar.

=== Radio ===
In addition to covering many sporting events on network radio, Slater hosted a Thursday night quiz show on CBS radio, Askit-Baskit, in 1940, using the stage name "Jim McWilliams".

=== Television ===
Slater hosted/emceed many early television shows:

- Birthday Party (1947), aka King Cole's Birthday Party
- Charade Quiz (1947)
- Messing Prize Party (1948)
- Twenty Questions (1949) DuMont and NBC versions
- Fishing and Hunting Club (1949)
- Broadway to Hollywood Headline Clues (1949)
- With This Ring (1951)

==== Sports broadcaster ====
Slater was the primary voice of Paramount News reels for many years beginning in 1936. Slater covered the 1936 Summer Olympics for NBC, announced for the New York Yankees and New York Giants baseball teams, the 1937 Sugar Bowl, West Point, Yale, Penn and other college football games, and later, tennis from Wimbledon and Forest Hills. Slater was noted for his clear, enthusiastic delivery. He was "very lyrical", said sportscaster Chris Schenkel.

Slater was announcing an NFL game between the Brooklyn Dodgers and the New York Giants when the first bulletin aired of the Japanese bombing of Pearl Harbor. He also co-announced the 1945 World Series on Mutual with Al Helfer, as well as the 1945 and 1946 All-Star Games, also on Mutual.

Slater gave commentary on the first television broadcast of a World Series in 1947 between the New York Yankees and Brooklyn Dodgers, which the Yankees won. His co-broadcasters for that event were Bob Stanton and Bob Edge. Slater was the chief radio announcer for the Indianapolis Motor Speedway Radio Network 500 Race in 1947 when the race was covered by the Mutual Broadcasting System.
