= Charade Quiz =

American game show (1947–1949)

- Directed by: Don Weiner
- Presented by: Bill Slater
- Country of origin: United States

Production
- Running time: 30 minutes

Original release
- Network: DuMont
- Release: November 27, 1947 – June 23, 1949

Charade Quiz is an American game show hosted by Bill Slater that aired on the DuMont Television Network Thursdays at 8:30 p.m. ET from November 27, 1947, (Note: Wesley Hyatt's book Emmy Award Winning Nighttime Television Shows, 1948–2004 says, "DuMont unveiled Charade Quiz ... on December 4, 1947.") to June 23, 1949.

== Overview ==
Episodes featured "a regular slate of actors with a panel of four trying to guess what they were pantomiming."

The program originated from the Adelphi Theatre in New York.

== Personnel ==
Bill Slater was the program's master of ceremonies. Victor Keppler was the producer, and Henry Alexander was the director. A review in the trade publication Billboard observed: "Slater's handling of the question-master's role was assured and good humored. The small troupe of youngsters who acted out the problems did an adequate job."

Charles Polacheck and Victor Keppler produced the program. Henry Alexander was the director, and Frank Bunetta was the technical director.

Beginning in July 1948, Whelan Drug Stores sponsored the program.

== Reception ==
A review in The New York Times in March 1948 called the program "a diverting half hour", although the quality varied from week to week with different actors and different people trying to guess what was being pantomimed. Reviewer Jack Gould also felt that Slater demonstrated "a certain smugness which is not particularly appealing".

== See also ==
- List of programs broadcast by the DuMont Television Network
- List of surviving DuMont Television Network broadcasts
- 1947–48 United States network television schedule
- 1948–49 United States network television schedule

== Bibliography ==
- David Weinstein, The Forgotten Network: DuMont and the Birth of American Television (Philadelphia: Temple University Press, 2004) ISBN 1-59213-245-6
- Alex McNeil, Total Television, Fourth edition (New York: Penguin Books, 1980) ISBN 0-14-024916-8
- Tim Brooks and Earle Marsh, The Complete Directory to Prime Time Network and Cable TV Shows 1946–Present, Ninth edition (New York: Ballantine Books, 2007) ISBN 978-0-345-49773-4
