= Television Playhouse =

American TV anthology series (1947–1948)

- Genre: Anthology
- Written by: Robert Alan Aurthur; Paddy Chayefsky; Sumner Locke Elliott; Horton Foote; Joseph Liss; Tad Mosel; Harry Muheim; N. Richard Nash; David Shaw; Stewart Stern
- Country of origin: United States
- Original language: English
- No. of seasons: 1

Production
- Camera setup: Multi-camera
- Running time: 25 mins.

Original release
- Release: December 4, 1947 – April 11, 1948

Television Playhouse is a half-hour American anthology series that was broadcast live on NBC. The series aired from December 4, 1947 to April 11, 1948, generally appearing every third Sunday during its run. The program was in cooperation with the National Theater and Academy, a federally sponsored theater group, and featured live performances of plays, some of which were by well-known authors.

The first presentation was The Last of My Solid Gold Watches by Tennessee Williams. Each episode featured actors and actresses who had not reached stardom. A wide variety of plays was presented on the program. Although short-lived, the "live play" format later became very popular during the early 1950s.

The show was broadcast on Sundays from 8:40 to 9:10 p.m. Eastern Time.

Another Television Playhouse would air in the 1950s (see The Philco Television Playhouse and Goodyear Television Playhouse).

== See also ==
- 1947-48 United States network television schedule
