= News and Views (television) =

American evening news program (1948-51)

News and Views was an early American evening news program. Broadcast on ABC from 1948 to 1951, it was ABC's first evening news program and one of the first such programs on any television network; Both CBS and NBC also initiated their evening news programs (respectively CBS Television News and Camel News Caravan, called Camel Newsreel Theatre at first) that same year, both debuting a few months before the first broadcast of News and Views on August 11, 1948. (Note: NBC had broadcast the Esso Newsreel earlier, but this was broadcast only a few days a week.The Dumont Network had broadcast The Walter Compton News on a regular schedule in 1947, though, although Dumont had relatively few stations.)

The co-anchors (not called that, as that meaning of "anchor" was not yet extant) were H. R. Baukhage and Jim Gibbons. Baukhage was a veteran radio broadcaster whose staccato baritone and gruff and abrupt sign-on, "Baukhage talking", was familiar to radio listeners of that era. Jim Gibbons was less well known.

Typical of evening television news programs of the era, it ran for fifteen minutes. Its successor was After the Deadlines and, ultimately, ABC World News Tonight, as seen in this list:

ABC evening news programs

- News and Views (August 11, 1948 – March 30, 1951);
- After the Deadlines (April 2, 1951 – October 3, 1952);
- All-Star News (October 6, 1952 – January 2, 1953);
- (No weekday evening news broadcast, January 5, 1953 – October 9, 1953);
- John Daly and the News (October 12, 1953 – September 12, 1958);
- ABC News (September 15, 1958 – May 8, 1959) (Note: During this time, John Daly and the News was broadcast at 10:30–10:45 PM, Eastern and Pacific times);
- John Daly and the News (May 11, 1959 – December 16, 1960);
- ABC World News Tonight (December 19, 1960 – present (As of 2022)) (Note: Also called, at various times, ABC Evening Report, ABC Evening News, and ABC World News, often with the name of the anchor appended).
