= I.N.S. Telenews =

- Country of origin: United States

Original release
- Network: DuMont Television Network
- Release: January 1948 – 1949

I.N.S. Telenews is an American news program aired on the now defunct DuMont Television Network from 1948 to 1949.

== Broadcast history ==
Each episode was 15 minutes long, made by International News Service, and aired weekly, each Tuesday at 7:45 pm EST, immediately following Camera Headlines which aired Monday through Friday at 7:30pm. As its name indicated, its main source of news information was the International News Service.

DuMont had aired The Walter Compton News, first as a local show on WTTG on June 16, 1947, then on the DuMont network from August 25, 1947, until January 1948, at which point DuMont replaced Compton's newscast with I.N.S. Telenews and Camera Headlines. After the two shows' cancellation in 1949, DuMont would not return to a network newscast until The DuMont Evening News was launched in 1954.

== Episode status ==
No recordings of I.N.S. Telenews are known to survive.

The UCLA Film and Television Archive has earlier Hearst newsreel series, such as Hearst Metrotone News and News of the Day, and a later series of Hearst newsreels syndicated to television called Telenews (1954-1962). Possibly some episodes of I.N.S. Telenews exist in these other collections. (Note: A Telenews item can be found on YouTube under the title "NHL 52-53 First Beliveau's game for Habs".)

== See also ==
- Camera Headlines
- The Walter Compton News
- DuMont Evening News
- Television news in the United States
- List of programs broadcast by the DuMont Television Network
- List of surviving DuMont Television Network broadcasts
- 1948-49 United States network television schedule

== Bibliography ==
- David Weinstein, The Forgotten Network: DuMont and the Birth of American Television (Philadelphia: Temple University Press, 2004) ISBN 1-59213-245-6
- Alex McNeil, Total Television, Fourth edition (New York: Penguin Books, 1980) ISBN 0-14-024916-8
- Tim Brooks and Earle Marsh, The Complete Directory to Prime Time Network TV Shows, Third edition (New York: Ballantine Books, 1964) ISBN 0-345-31864-1
