= Look Upon a Star =

- Genre: Variety
- Created by: Joseph Cates; Robert V. Fuchs
- Presented by: Bess Myerson
- Country of origin: United States
- Original language: English

Production
- Producer: Joseph Cates
- Running time: 30 minutes

Original release
- Network: DuMont
- Release: October 1947 – January 1948

Look Upon a Star is an American live television series, hosted by Bess Myerson and produced by Joseph Cates. The series aired on two DuMont Television Network stations, WABD and WTTG, during 1947. The show also aired on WRGB-TV, the General Electric TV station in Schenectady, New York.

The show featured high school students (one of television's earliest talent series), and was a 30-minute series broadcast on Tuesdays at 7:30pm ET. The Comet Candy Company was the sponsor. Look Upon a Star replaced Highway to the Stars (August to October 1947), and was itself replaced by Camera Headlines in January 1948.

== Controversy ==
According to the November 1, 1947, edition of newspaper The Afro American, an episode in which an African-American male and a white female, both members of the Katherine Dunham dance troupe, appeared on Look Upon a Star. The couple performed a dance together on the show, which created a controversy, with more than 100 objecting letters being sent in.

In response, Joseph Cates, one of the producers of the series, was quoted as saying "as producers we exercise the democratic privilege of producing our own shows as we see fit. The prejudiced television viewer can exercise his democratic privilege of switching his dial off or to a different station".

== Episode status ==
As with most DuMont series, no episodes are known to survive.

== See also ==
- List of programs broadcast by the DuMont Television Network
- List of surviving DuMont Television Network broadcasts
- 1947-48 United States network television schedule
- Eloise Salutes the Stars

== Bibliography ==
- David Weinstein, The Forgotten Network: DuMont and the Birth of American Television (Philadelphia: Temple University Press, 2004) ISBN 1-59213-245-6
- Alex McNeil, Total Television, Fourth edition (New York: Penguin Books, 1980) ISBN 0-14-024916-8
- Tim Brooks and Earle Marsh, The Complete Directory to Prime Time Network TV Shows, Third edition (New York: Ballantine Books, 1964) ISBN 0-345-31864-1
