= Missus Goes a Shopping =

- Genre: Game show
- Presented by: John Reed King

Original release
- Network: CBS
- Release: November 19, 1947 – January 12, 1949

Missus Goes A-Shopping is one of the earliest game shows to be broadcast on live television. The show first aired on CBS Radio from February 17, 1941 to December 21, 1951. The daytime TV version began November 19, 1947. It was "CBS's first commercial daytime series." The show was "set very simply in a store", with John Reed King as master of ceremonies. It was televised locally on WCBW in New York City as early as December 1944. That same month, Jimmy Durante made an unannounced appearance on the program.

On August 3, 1944 the early CBS Television network began airing a primetime TV version until January 22, 1946. The original host was King.

== Hosting changes ==
King hosted through the debut of the CBS Television Network's daytime television version (which began on November 19, 1947, and ended on November 10, 1948), after which he was briefly replaced by Bud Collyer with a new title of This Is the Missus on November 17.

In December, Collyer was replaced by Warren Hull until the series ended on January 12, 1949. Throughout the run, future What's My Line? producer Gil Fates served as a substitute host.
