= Let's Rhumba =

American TV dance series

- Presented by: D'Avalos
- Country of origin: United States
- Original language: English

Production
- Running time: 15 minutes

Original release
- Network: NBC
- Release: November 15, 1946 – January 17, 1947

Let's Rhumba is an American Latin dance instruction program that aired on NBC from November 15, 1946, to January 17, 1947. Each 15-minute episode was hosted by D'Avalos. No episodes are known to survive as NBC had no archival policy at the time.
