= Joseph W. Hasel =

Joseph W. Hasel was a broadcaster who, among many other activities, interviewed Babe Ruth for Armed Forces Radio Service during World War II. Hasel attended Cheshire Academy, and donated his archives to the school. The materials include an interview with Babe Ruth.

Hasel also attended Columbia University for two years, and at one point, broadcast their football games. He also broadcast New York Giant games for radio station WNEW.
