= King Cole's Birthday Party =

- Also known as: Birthday Party
- Genre: Children's
- Presented by: Bill Slater (1947); Ted Brown (1949)
- Country of origin: United States
- Original language: English

Production
- Running time: 22–25 minutes

Original release
- Network: DuMont
- Release: May 15, 1947 – June 23, 1949

King Cole's Birthday Party (also known as Birthday Party) is an early American children's television series which aired on the DuMont Television Network. The program was broadcast from May 15, 1947, to June 23, 1949.

Little is known about the series. Each 30-minute episode featured the real birthday of a child. The series was sponsored by the Jay Day Dress Company of New York.

The program was first broadcast locally over DuMont's WABD in New York City. By early 1948, King Cole's Birthday Party was aired nationally on DuMont's chain of stations. Among the people to have hosted the program include Bill Slater and Ted Brown.

George Schreck produced the show.

The concept was revived from 1963 to 1966 as Birthday House, which aired locally on WNBC in New York.

== Episode status ==
As with most DuMont programs, no episodes are known to survive.

== See also ==
- List of programs broadcast by the DuMont Television Network
- List of surviving DuMont Television Network broadcasts

== Bibliography ==
- David Weinstein, The Forgotten Network: DuMont and the Birth of American Television (Philadelphia: Temple University Press, 2004) ISBN 1-59213-245-6
- Alex McNeil, Total Television, Fourth edition (New York: Penguin Books, 1980) ISBN 0-14-024916-8
- Tim Brooks and Earle Marsh, The Complete Directory to Prime Time Network and Cable TV Shows 1946–Present, Ninth edition (New York: Ballantine Books, 2007) ISBN 978-0-345-49773-4
