= Small Fry Club =

- Genre: Children's program
- Presented by: Bob Emery
- Country of origin: United States

Production
- Running time: 30 minutes

Original release
- Release: March 11, 1947 – June 15, 1951

Small Fry Club is a children's television program that was broadcast on the DuMont Television Network. It debuted on March 11, 1947, with the title Movies for Small Fry and ended on June 15, 1951. Initially a weekly program, it grew in frequency to five days per week and in 1948 was aired seven days a week.

The program is notable for having been "the first networked children's show".

== Format ==
As the original title implied, Movies for Small Fry featured films and cartoons for children. Bob Emery (who referred to himself as "Big Brother") provided off-screen voiceovers for the material. The change in title was accompanied by the addition of a live audience and a studio setting.

Small Fry Club "promoted good behavior and healthy habits." In addition to films and cartoons, entertainment included demonstrations, songs, puppets, and actors in animal suits who performed short sketches.

Dressed in a suit and wearing glasses, Emery often played the banjo and sang, "... beginning each show with a rendition of 'The Grass Is Always Greener in the Other Fellow's Yard,' a song from the 1920s about being satisfied with what you have and not being envious of others." The song set the tone for Emery's teaching children in the audience about "good manners, self-discipline, and respect for others."

The program was produced by Emery and his wife, Kay. It was sponsored by American Pipe Cleaner Company and Fischer Baking Company.

== Promotion ==
Complementing the program, an actual Small Fry Club existed for youngsters who watched the show. Among other activities, they could submit artwork and written material and participate in contests. More than 10,000 children had joined the club by the end of 1947. Three years later, the number of members had reached 150,000.

== Boston sequel ==
After DuMont ended Small Fry Club, Emery began a similar program, The Big Brother Bob Emery Show, on WBZ-TV in Boston. It ended with his retirement in 1968.
