= The Walter Compton News =

- Starring: Walter Compton
- Country of origin: United States

Production
- Running time: 15 minutes

Original release
- Network: DuMont
- Release: June 16, 1947 – January 1948

The Walter Compton News is an American television news series that aired from 1947 to 1948 on the DuMont Television Network Monday through Friday from 6:45 pm to 7 pm ET.

== Broadcast history ==
The Walter Compton News premiered on DuMont station WTTG on June 16, 1947, then on the DuMont network on August 25, 1947, but was reportedly off the air by January 1948. This show had seasoned radio broadcaster and executive Walter Compton (1912-1959) reading news from a script with the occasional use of slides. Beginning on November 17, General Electric became a sponsor of The Walter Compton News. In 1942, Compton had been host of Quiz of Two Cities, aired by Mutual Radio on WOL-AM in Washington DC, and on WFBR in Baltimore. The program is notable for having been "the first news series on a television network to originate from Washington."

Premiering in January 1948, Camera Headlines was a second attempt by DuMont to present a TV news program, this time using newsreel film footage. Camera Headlines alternated with I.N.S. Telenews.

It may also have been the first nightly television newscast to appear over a network, although it is possible that a television simulcast of Lowell Thomas's NBC Blue Radio Network newscast in 1940 and 1941 may have been seen, at least occasionally, on W2XB Schenectady and/or W3XE Philadelphia, but records are also quite sketchy.

== Episode status ==
As with many DuMont programs, no episodes of The Walter Compton News are known to survive. Kinescopes were not available until the fall of 1947, and were used sparingly in the early years. Little else is known about the series, even though it aired on a major United States television network.

== See also ==
- List of programs broadcast by the DuMont Television Network
- List of surviving DuMont Television Network broadcasts
- Television news in the United States
- 1947-48 United States network television schedule

== Bibliography ==
- David Weinstein, The Forgotten Network: DuMont and the Birth of American Television (Philadelphia: Temple University Press, 2004) ISBN 1-59213-245-6
- Alex McNeil, Total Television, Fourth edition (New York: Penguin Books, 1980) ISBN 0-14-024916-8
- Tim Brooks and Earle Marsh, The Complete Directory to Prime Time Network TV Shows, Third edition (New York: Ballantine Books, 1964) ISBN 0-345-31864-1
