= 1950 in American television =

This is a list of American television-related events in 1950.

== Events ==
Date	Event	Ref.
May	The television production company Desilu Productions was founded by Desi Arnaz and Lucille Ball.	
October 10	CBS' color television system is approved by the Federal Communications Commission. This approval goes in effect on November 20.	

=== Other information ===
One million American households were reported to own a television set in 1950.

== Television programs ==
=== Debuts ===
Date	Debut	Network	Notes/Ref.
January 4	Abe Burrows' Almanac	CBS	
January 7	The Ken Murray Show	CBS	
January 7	Rocky King, Detective	DuMont	
January 13	Life Begins at Eighty	NBC	
January 17	Cavalcade of Bands	DuMont	
January 28	Dinner Date	DuMont	
January 30	Robert Montgomery Presents	NBC	
February 2	What's My Line?	CBS	
February 25	Your Show of Shows	NBC	
March 9	Space Patrol	ABC	
March 19	Windy City Jamboree	DuMont	
March 23	Beat the Clock	CBS	
April	Adventure Playhouse	DuMont	
April	Screen Mystery	DuMont	
April 5	Joey Faye's Frolics	CBS	
April 6	The Alan Young Show	CBS	
April 9	Starlit Time	DuMont	
April 15	Buck Rogers	ABC	
April 19	Stage 13	CBS	
April 29	The Trap	CBS	
May	Frontier Theatre	DuMont	
May 21	Mama Rosa	ABC	
May 29	Broadway Open House	NBC	
June 6	Armstrong Circle Theatre	NBC	
June 17	Hawkins Falls	NBC	
July 1	Big Top	CBS	
July 3	Visit with the Armed Forces	DuMont	
July 3	The Hazel Scott Show	DuMont	
July 4	The Joan Edwards Show	DuMont	
July 4	Sure as Fate	CBS	
July 7	Detective's Wife	CBS	
July 10	Your Hit Parade	NBC	Migrated from radio
July 11	The Web	CBS	
July 23	The Gene Autry Show	CBS	
July 29	Country Style	DuMont	
August 1	Crusader Rabbit	First-run Syndication	
August 6	Rhythm Rodeo	DuMont	
August 27	Hold That Camera	DuMont	
September 2	Star Time	DuMont	
September 2	The Twinkle in Your Eye	DuMont	
September 2	Chez Paree Revue	DuMont	
September 5	The Cisco Kid	First-run Syndication	
September 6	Stars Over Hollywood	NBC	First television series produced by Revue Productions
September 7	Truth or Consequences	CBS	Migrated from radio
September 10	The Colgate Comedy Hour	NBC	
September 11	The Adventures of Paddy the Pelican	ABC	
September 11	Dick Tracy	ABC	
September 11	Treasury Men in Action	ABC	
September 18	The Speidel Show	NBC	Later retitled The Paul Winchell Show
September 21	The Nash Airflyte Theater	CBS	
September 26	Danger	CBS	
October	Eloise Salutes the Stars	DuMont	
October 2	Lux Video Theatre	CBS	
October 2	The Susan Raye Show	DuMont	
October 2	Tom Corbett, Space Cadet	CBS	
October 3	Beulah	ABC	
October 3	The Billy Rose Show	ABC	
October 4	Four Star Revue	NBC	
October 4	You Bet Your Life	NBC	Migration from radio
October 5	Big Town	CBS	Migration from radio
October 6	Pulitzer Prize Playhouse	ABC	
October 7	Saturday Night at the Garden	DuMont	
October 7	The Frank Sinatra Show	CBS	
October 10	Prudential Family Playhouse	CBS	
October 12	The George Burns and Gracie Allen Show	CBS	Migration from radio
October 15	The Gabby Hayes Show	NBC	
October 18	Somerset Maugham TV Theatre	CBS	
October 18	The Most Important People	DuMont	
October 19	The Adventures of Ellery Queen	DuMont	
October 21	The Stu Erwin Show	ABC	
October 22	Our Secret Weapon: The Truth	DuMont	
October 28	The Jack Benny Program	CBS	Migration from radio
November 4	Your Story Theatre	DuMont	
December 4	The First Hundred Years	CBS	
December 10	The Bigelow Theatre	CBS	
December 22	Charlie Wild, Private Detective	CBS	
December 29	You Asked for It	DuMont	

=== Change in Network Affiliation ===
Show	Moved from	Moved to
The Arthur Murray Party	ABC	Dumont
The Johns Hopkins Science Review	CBS	Dumont
The Bigelow Theatre	CBS	Dumont

=== Ending this year ===
Date	Show	Network	Debut	Notes
January 2	And Everything Nice	DuMont	March 15, 1949	
January 3	The Sonny Kendis Show	CBS	April 18, 1949	
January 10	The O'Neills	DuMont	September 6, 1949	
January 26	The Front Page	CBS	September 29, 1949	
February 4	Spin the Picture	DuMont	June 4, 1949	
March 11	Mary Kay and Johnny	NBC	1947	Series began on DuMont
March 25	Television Theatre	CBS	June 2, 1950	
March 29	Abe Burrows' Almanac	CBS	January 4, 1950	
March 30	The Black Robe	NBC	May 18, 1949	
April 9	Bowling Headliners	DuMont	December 26, 1948 (on ABC)	
April 12	Joey Faye's Frolics	CBS	April 5, 1950	
April 21	The Little Revue	ABC	September 4, 1949	
May	Adventure Playhouse	DuMont	April 1950	
May 22	Newsweek Views the News	DuMont	November 7, 1948	
June 11	Mama Rosa	ABC	May 21, 1950	
June 14	Easy Aces	DuMont	December 14, 1949	
June 18	Windy City Jamboree	DuMont	March 19, 1950	
June 23	Actors Studio	CBS	September 26, 1948	
June 24	The Trap	CBS	April 29, 1950	
June 25	Colgate Theatre	NBC	January 3, 1949	
June 26	The Chevrolet Tele-Theatre	NBC	September 27, 1948	
June 28	Stage 13	CBS	April 19, 1950	
July 4	The Ed Wynn Show	CBS	September 22, 1949	
August 11	People's Platform	CBS	August 17, 1948	
September	Frontier Theatre	DuMont	May	
September 29	The Hazel Scott Show	DuMont	July 3, 1950	
September 29	Detective's Wife	CBS	July 7, 1950	
October 8	Think Fast	ABC	March 26, 1949	
October 13	The Adventures of Paddy the Pelican	ABC	September 11, 1950	
October 15	Believe It or Not!	DuMont	March 1, 1949	
October 23	Mysteries of Chinatown	ABC	December 4, 1949	
October 24	The Joan Edwards Show	DuMont	July 4, 1950	
November 19	Starlit Time	DuMont	April 9, 1950	
November 20	The Susan Raye Show	DuMont	October 2, 1950	
November 25	Country Style	DuMont	July 29, 1950	
December 1	TV Shopper	DuMont	November 1, 1948	
December 15	Hold That Camera	DuMont	August 27, 1950	
Unknown date	Cartoon Teletales	ABC	1948	
Unknown date	The Vincent Lopez Show	DuMont	March 7, 1949	Returned in 1957 on CBS
Unknown date	Amateur Boxing Fight Club	DuMont	September 1949	
Unknown date	Boxing from Sunnyside Gardens	DuMont	September 1949	
Unknown date	You Are an Artist	NBC	May 13, 1946	
Unknown date	Your Witness	ABC	September 19, 1949	
Unknown date	Chez Paree Revue	DuMont	September 2, 1950	

== Television stations ==
=== Station launches ===
Date	City of License/Market	Station	Channel	Affiliation	Notes/Ref.
February 15	San Antonio, Texas	KEYL	5	CBS (primary); DuMont/Paramount/ABC (secondary)	
February 15	Syracuse, New York	WSYR-TV	3	NBC	
February 21	Ames/Des Moines, Iowa	WOI-TV	5	CBS (primary); NBC (secondary)	
March 27	Louisville, Kentucky	WHAS-TV	9 (now 11)	CBS (primary); ABC (secondary)	
April 2	Norfolk, Virginia	WTAR-TV	3	NBC (primary); ABC/DuMont (secondary)	
May 1	Lansing, Michigan	WJIM-TV	6	CBS (primary); NBC/ABC/DuMont (secondary)	
July 1	Rock Island/Moline, Illinois; Bettendorf/Davenport, Iowa	WHBF-TV	4	CBS (primary); NBC/DuMont (secondary)	
July 9	Kalamazoo/Grand Rapids, Michigan	WKZO-TV	3	CBS (primary); NBC/ABC/DuMont (secondary)	
September 30	Nashville, Tennessee	WSM-TV	4	NBC (primary); ABC/CBS/DuMont (secondary)	

=== Network affiliation changes ===
Date	City of license/Market	Station	Channel	Old affiliation	New affiliation	Notes/Ref.
Unknown date	Dallas, Texas	KBTV	8	DuMont	NBC	
