= 1950–51 United States network television schedule =

The following is the 1950–51 network television schedule for the four major English language commercial broadcast networks in the United States. The schedule covers primetime hours from September 1950 through March 1951. The schedule is followed by a list per network of returning series, new series, and series cancelled after the 1949–50 season. This season became the first in which primetime was entirely covered by the networks. It was also the inaugural season of the Nielsen rating system. Late in the season, the coast-to-coast link was in service.

In September 1950, NBC added two live variety series, Four Star Revue and The Colgate Comedy Hour, to its fall schedule. These programs were a network effort to bring NBC's most popular radio stars to television; talent included Eddie Cantor, Jack Carson, Dean Martin and Jerry Lewis, Jimmy Durante, Danny Thomas, Ed Wynn, Bob Hope and Fred Allen. The two new star-studded series were scheduled directly against two of CBS's most popular programs: Four Star Revue went up against Arthur Godfrey and Friends on Wednesday nights, while The Colgate Comedy Hour was slated against Toast of the Town. NBC was confident that its strategy would pay off.

CBS answered NBC's schedule with big radio stars and variety programs of its own, bringing in Frank Sinatra and (in occasional specials) Bing Crosby, Jack Benny, and Edgar Bergen. "Despite the big budget variety shows in its schedule, though, CBS felt that situation comedy was actually a more stable television form that would be easier to exploit in the long run."

In many time slots, the underfunded DuMont Network did not bother to compete against NBC's or CBS's hit series, instead airing what some TV historians have called "time-filler". For example: "During its long run The Johns Hopkins Science Review was scheduled against such hit shows as Break the Bank [and] Dragnet, programs from which its network had little chance of luring away viewers." During fall 1950, The Court of Current Issues and The Johns Hopkins Science Review aired at the same time as the most heavily viewed program on television, NBC's Texaco Star Theater. Given the competition, DuMont's Tuesday night public-affairs programming attracted virtually no audience. The network had some success with a crime drama that had debuted in January the previous season titled Inside Detective (later retitled Rocky King Detective), which became one of the longest-running series on the network. Another DuMont series to debut during the season, Star Time, while short-lived, is remembered for including a television version of the popular radio sketches The Bickersons, and for being an early example of a sponsored network series to feature an African-American as a regular (jazz pianist Teddy Wilson, a familiar member of the Benny Goodman Sextet).

New fall series are highlighted in bold.

== Legend ==
- Light blue indicates local programming..
- Dark blue indicates news programming.
- Light green indicates sporting events.
- Light purple indicates movies.
- Red indicates irregularly-scheduled programs, including specials.

Each of the 30 highest-rated shows is listed with its rank and rating as determined by Nielsen Media Research.

- Lime indicates the #1 most watched programs of the season.
- Yellow indicates the top-10 most watched programs of the season.
- Cyan indicates the top-20 most watched programs of the season.
- Magenta indicates the top-30 most watched programs of the season.

== Sunday ==
Network	7:00 p.m.	7:30 p.m.	8:00 p.m.	8:30 p.m.	9:00 p.m.	9:30 p.m.	10:00 p.m.	10:30 p.m.
ABC	Paul Whiteman's Goodyear Revue	**Showtime U.S.A.**	**Hollywood Premiere Theatre**	Sit or Miss	Soap Box Theater	The Marshall Plan in Action	Life Begins at Eighty	Youth on the March
CBS	The Gene Autry Show	This Is Show Business / **The Jack Benny Program**	Toast of the Town (15/36.5)		The Fred Waring Show		Celebrity Time	What's My Line?
DMN	**Star Time**		Rhythm Rodeo	Local Programming	The Arthur Murray Party		They Stand Accused	
NBC	Leave It to the Girls	The Aldrich Family (16/36.1)	**The Colgate Comedy Hour** (5/42.0)		The Philco Television Playhouse (3/45.3)		Garroway at Large	**Take a Chance**

Note: On CBS, beginning in January, The Jack Benny Program aired as occasional specials once every six to eight weeks.

Hopalong Cassidy (9/39.9) aired on NBC from 6:00 to 7:00 p.m. The Bigelow Theatre aired on CBS from 6:00 to 6:30 p.m. from December 1950 to June 1951.

== Monday ==
Network		7:00 p.m.	7:30 p.m.	8:00 p.m.	8:30 p.m.	9:00 p.m.	9:30 p.m.	10:00 p.m.	10:30 p.m.
ABC		Club Seven	Hollywood Screen Test	**Treasury Men in Action**	Dick Tracy	**The College Bowl**	On Trial	**Feature Film**	
CBS	Fall	The Stork Club	CBS Television News (7:30) / **The Perry Como Show** (7:45)	**Lux Video Theatre** (30/31.5) (Tied with The Speidel Show)	Arthur Godfrey's Talent Scouts (8/40.6)	**The Horace Heidt Show**	The Goldbergs	Studio One (24/33.8)	
CBS	June	The Stork Club	CBS Television News (7:30) / **The Perry Como Show** (7:45)	**Lux Video Theatre** (30/31.5) (Tied with The Speidel Show)	Arthur Godfrey's Talent Scouts (8/40.6)	**The Horace Heidt Show**	**Who's Whose**	Studio One (24/33.8)	
CBS	Follow-up	The Stork Club	CBS Television News (7:30) / **The Perry Como Show** (7:45)	**Lux Video Theatre** (30/31.5) (Tied with The Speidel Show)	Arthur Godfrey's Talent Scouts (8/40.6)	**The Horace Heidt Show**	**It's News to Me**	Studio One (24/33.8)	
DMN		Captain Video and His Video Rangers	Manhattan Spotlight (7:30) / **The Susan Raye Show** (7:45)	Visit With the Armed Forces	The Al Morgan Show	Wrestling From Columbia Park Arena			
NBC	Fall	Kukla, Fran and Ollie	Mohawk Showroom (7:30) / Camel News Caravan (7:45)	**The Speidel Show** (30/31.5) (Tied with Lux Video Theatre)	The Voice of Firestone	Lights Out (19/35.6) (Tied with Armstrong Circle Theatre and Big Town)	Robert Montgomery Presents (11/38.8) / **Musical Comedy Time**		Who Said That?
NBC	Summer	Kukla, Fran and Ollie	Mohawk Showroom (7:30) / Camel News Caravan (7:45)	**Tag the Gag**	The Voice of Firestone	Lights Out (19/35.6) (Tied with Armstrong Circle Theatre and Big Town)	Robert Montgomery Presents (11/38.8) / **Musical Comedy Time**		Who Said That?

== Tuesday ==
Network	7:00 p.m.	7:30 p.m.	8:00 p.m.	8:30 p.m.	9:00 p.m.	9:30 p.m.	10:00 p.m.	10:30 p.m.
ABC	Club Seven	**The Beulah Show**	**The Game of the Week**	Buck Rogers in the 25th Century	**The Billy Rose Show**	**Can You Top This?**	Life Begins at Eighty	Roller Derby
CBS	The Stork Club	CBS Television News (7:30) / The Faye Emerson Show (7:45)	Sure as Fate / **Prudential Family Playhouse**		**The Vaughn Monroe Show**	Suspense	**Danger**	We Take Your Word
DMN	Captain Video and His Video Rangers	Manhattan Spotlight (7:30) / The Joan Edwards Show (7:45)	Court of Current Issues	The Johns Hopkins Science Review	Cavalcade of Bands		**Star Time**	
NBC	Kukla, Fran and Ollie	The Little Show (7:30) / Camel News Caravan (7:45)	Texaco Star Theater (1/61.6)		Fireside Theatre (2/52.6)	Armstrong Circle Theatre (19/35.6) (Tied with Lights Out and Big Town)	The Original Amateur Hour (26/33.4) (Tied with Pabst Blue Ribbon Bouts)	

== Wednesday ==
Network	7:00 p.m.	7:30 p.m.	8:00 p.m.	8:30 p.m.	9:00 p.m.	9:30 p.m.	10:00 p.m.	10:30 p.m.
ABC	Club Seven	**Chance of a Lifetime**	**First Nighter**	**Don McNeill's TV Club**	Wrestling From the Rainbo in Chicago			
CBS	The Stork Club	CBS Television News (7:30) / **The Perry Como Show** (7:45)	Arthur Godfrey and His Friends (18/35.9)		**Teller of Tales**	The Web	Pabst Blue Ribbon Bouts (26/33.4) (Tied with The Original Amateur Hour)	
DMN	Captain Video and His Video Rangers	**The Most Important People** (7:30) / Local Programming (7:45)	Local Programming		Famous Jury Trials	The Plainclothesman	Broadway to Hollywood – Headline Clues	Local Programming
NBC	Kukla, Fran and Ollie	Mohawk Showroom (7:30) / Camel News Caravan (7:45)	**Four Star Revue**		Kraft Television Theatre (14/37.0)		Break the Bank	**Stars Over Hollywood**

== Thursday ==
Network	7:00 p.m.	7:30 p.m.	8:00 p.m.	8:30 p.m.	9:00 p.m.	9:30 p.m.	10:00 p.m.	10:30 p.m.
ABC	Club Seven	The Lone Ranger (7/41.2)	Stop the Music (23/34.0)		Holiday Hotel	Blind Date	**I Cover Times Square**	Roller Derby
CBS	The Stork Club	CBS Television News (7:30) / The Faye Emerson Show (7:45)	**The George Burns and Gracie Allen Show** / Starlight Theatre	The Show Goes On	The Alan Young Show (22/34.4)	**Big Town** (19/35.6) (Tied with Armstrong Circle Theatre and Lights Out)	**Truth or Consequences**	**The Nash Airflyte Theater**
DMN	Captain Video and His Video Rangers	Manhattan Spotlight (7:30) / The Joan Edwards Show (7:45)	Local Programming		**The Adventures of Ellery Queen**	Local Programming		
NBC	Kukla, Fran and Ollie	The Little Show (7:30) / Camel News Caravan (7:45)	**You Bet Your Life** (17/36.0)	Hawkins Falls	Kay Kyser's Kollege of Musical Knowledge		Martin Kane, Private Eye (12/37.8)	The Wayne King Show*

* Wayne King was seen only on NBC's Midwest Network.

== Friday ==
Network		7:00 p.m.	7:30 p.m.	8:00 p.m.	8:30 p.m.	9:00 p.m.	9:30 p.m.	10:00 p.m.	10:30 p.m.
ABC		Club Seven	**Life with Linkletter**	Twenty Questions	**Pro Football Highlights**	**Pulitzer Prize Playhouse**		**Penthouse Party**	Studs' Place
CBS		The Stork Club	CBS Television News (7:30) / **The Perry Como Show** (7:45)	Mama (10/39.7)	Man Against Crime (13/37.4)	Ford Theatre / **Magnavox Theatre**		**Star of the Family**	Beat the Clock
DMN		Captain Video and His Video Rangers	**The Most Important People** (7:30) / **The Susan Raye Show** (7:45)	Local Programming	**Hold That Camera**	Hands of Murder	Rocky King, Inside Detective	Cavalcade of Stars	
NBC	Fall	Kukla, Fran and Ollie	Mohawk Showroom (7:30) / Camel News Caravan (7:45)	Quiz Kids	We, the People	Bonny Maid Versatile Varieties	The Big Story (25/33.7) / The Clock	Gillette Cavalcade of Sports (6/41.3) (10:00) / Greatest Fights of the Century (10:45)	
NBC	Spring	Kukla, Fran and Ollie	Mohawk Showroom (7:30) / Camel News Caravan (7:45)	Quiz Kids	We, the People	Bonny Maid Versatile Varieties	The Big Story (25/33.7)	Gillette Cavalcade of Sports (6/41.3) (10:00) / Greatest Fights of the Century (10:45)	

== Saturday ==
Network		7:00 p.m.	7:30 p.m.	8:00 p.m.	8:30 p.m.	9:00 p.m.	9:30 p.m.	10:00 p.m.	10:30 p.m.
ABC		**Sandy Dreams**	**Life with the Erwins**	Paul Whiteman's TV Teen Club		Roller Derby			
CBS	Fall	Big Top (6:30)	The Week in Review (7:30) / The Faye Emerson Show (7:45)	The Ken Murray Show (28/32.1)		**The Frank Sinatra Show**		**Sing It Again**	Local Programming
CBS	January	Local Programming	The Week in Review (7:30) / The Faye Emerson Show (7:45)	The Ken Murray Show (28/32.1)		**The Frank Sinatra Show**		**Sing It Again**	Local Programming
CBS	Summer	Local Programming	The Week in Review (7:30) / The Faye Emerson Show (7:45)	The Ken Murray Show (28/32.1)		**The Frank Sinatra Show**		**Faye Emerson's Wonderful Town**	Local Programming
DMN		Captain Video and His Video Rangers	Local Programming	Country Style		**Saturday Night at the Garden**			
NBC	Fall	**The Hank McCune Show**	One Man's Family	The Jack Carter Show		Your Show of Shows (4/42.6)			Your Hit Parade (29/32.0)
NBC	Summer	**The Hank McCune Show**	One Man's Family	**Saturday Roundup**		Your Show of Shows (4/42.6)			Your Hit Parade (29/32.0)

Notes: On CBS, Big Top aired from 6:30 to 7:30 p.m. Eastern Time from September 1950 to January 6, 1951, after which it moved to Saturdays from noon to 1:00 p.m., where it ran for another seven years. Faye Emerson's Wonderful Town began on June 16, 1951, and concluded its 42-episode run at 9 p.m. on April 12, 1952.

== By network ==
=== ABC ===
**Returning Series**

- Actors Studio
- Author Meets the Critics
- Blind Date
- Buck Rogers
- Celebrity Time
- Club Seven
- Crusade in Europe
- Dick Tracy
- Holiday Hotel
- Hollywood Screen Test
- Life Begins at Eighty
- The Lone Ranger
- The Marshall Plan in Action
- News and Views
- On Trial
- Paul Whiteman's Goodyear Revue
- Paul Whiteman's TV Teen Club
- Photoplay Time
- Roller Derby
- The Ruggles
- Sit or Miss
- Soapbox Derby Theater
- Stop the Music
- Studs's Place
- Twenty Questions
- Wrestling from the Rainbo in Chicago
- Youth on the March

**New Series**

- **After the Deadlines** *
- **The Beulah Show**
- **The Billy Rose Show**
- **Can You Top This?**
- **Chance of a Lifetime**
- **The College Bowl**
- **Don McNeill's TV Club**
- **Faith Baldwin Romance Theatre** *
- **Feature Film**
- **First Nighter**
- **The Game of the Week**
- **Hollywood Premiere Theatre**
- **I Cover Times Square**
- **Life with Linkletter**
- **Life with the Erwins**
- **Penthouse Party**
- **Pro Football Highlights**
- **Pulitzer Prize Playhouse**
- **Sandy Dreams**
- **Showtime U.S.A.**
- **Treasury Men in Action**

Not returning from 1949–50:

- ABC Barn Dance
- ABC Penthouse Players
- Actors Studio
- Auction-Aire
- The Boris Karloff Mystery Playhouse
- Crusade in Europe
- Fun for the Money
- Let There Be Stars
- Little Revue
- Majority Rules
- Mama Rosa
- Mr. Black
- Mysteries of Chinatown
- News and Views
- Oboler Comedy Theater
- Photocrime
- Photoplay Time
- Stained Glass Windows
- Starring Boris Karloff
- Think Fast
- Tomorrow's Boxing Champions
- Volume One
- Your Witness

=== CBS ===
**Returning Series**

- The Alan Young Show
- Arthur Godfrey and His Friends
- Arthur Godfrey's Talent Scouts
- Beat the Clock
- Big Top
- CBS Television News
- Celebrity Time
- The Faye Emerson Show
- Ford Theater
- The Fred Waring Show
- The Garry Moore Show
- The Gene Autry Show
- The Goldbergs
- Joey Faye's Frolics
- The Ken Murray Show
- Mama
- Man Against Crime
- Pabst Blue Ribbon Bouts
- The Show Goes On
- Starlight Theatre
- The Stork Club
- Suspense
- This Is Show Business
- Toast of the Town
- We Take Tour Word
- The Web
- The Week in Review
- What's My Line?

**New Series**

- **The Ad-Libbers** *
- **Big Town**
- **The Bigelow Theatre** *
- **Casey, Crime Photographer**
- **Charlie Wild, Private Detective** *
- **Danger**
- **Faye Emerson's Wonderful Town** *
- **The Frank Sinatra Show**
- **The George Burns and Gracie Allen Show**
- **The Horace Heidt Show**
- **It's News to Me**
- **The Jack Benny Program**
- **The Lux Video Theatre**
- **Magnavox Theatre**
- **The Nash Airflyte Theater**
- **The Perry Como Show**
- **Prudential Family Playhouse**
- **Racket Squad** *
- **Star of the Family**
- **Sure as Fate**
- **Truth or Consequences**
- **The Vaughn Monroe Show**
- **Who's Whose** *

Not returning from 1949–50:

- 54th Street Revue
- Abe Burrows' Almanac
- The Bigelow Show
- The Black Robe
- Blues by Bargy
- Capitol Cloak Room
- Detective's Wife
- Earl Wrightson at Home
- The Ed Wynn Show
- Escape
- The Front Page
- Inside U.S.A. with Chevrolet
- Lucky Pup
- The Paul Arnold Show
- People's Platform
- Premiere Playhouse
- The Roar of the Rails
- Romance
- Ruthie on the Telephone
- The Silver Theatre
- The Sonny Kendis Show
- Stage 13
- The Stage Door
- Starlight Theatre
- The Ted Steele Show
- Television Theatre
- To the Queen's Taste
- Tonight on Broadway
- The Trap
- Uptown Jubilee
- The Week in Sports
- Your Sports Special

=== DuMont ===
**Returning series**

- The Al Morgan Show
- The Armed Forces Hour (moved from NBC)
- The Arthur Murray Party
- Broadway to Hollywood
- Captain Video and His Video Rangers
- Cavalcade of Bands
- Cavalcade of Stars
- Country Style
- Famous Jury Trials
- Georgetown University Forum
- Hands of Murder
- The Hazel Scott Show
- The Joan Edwards Show
- Johnny Olson's Rumpus Room
- Manhattan Spotlight
- Okay, Mother
- The Plainclothesman
- Rhythm Rodeo
- Rocky King, Inside Detective
- They Stand Accused
- Starlit Time
- Visit with the Armed Forces
- Wrestling from Columbia Park Arena

**New series**

- **The Adventures of Ellery Queen**
- **DuMont Royal Theater** *
- **Hold That Camera**
- **Ladies Before Gentlemen** *
- **Major Dell Conway of the Flying Tigers** *
- **The Most Important People**
- **Not for Publication** *
- **Once Upon a Tune**
- **Our Secret Weapon: The Truth**
- **Rhythm Rodeo**
- **Saturday Night at the Garden**
- **Shadow of the Cloak** *
- **Star Time**
- **The Susan Raye Show**
- **What's the Story** *
- **With This Ring** *
- **Your Story Theatre**

Not returning from 1949–50:

- Adventure Playhouse
- Amanda
- And Everything Nice
- Bowling Headliners
- Chicagoland Mystery Players
- Cinema Varieties
- Country Style
- Court of Current Issues
- Dinner Date with Vincent Lopez
- Easy Aces
- The Family Genius
- Feature Theater
- Fishing and Hunting Club
- Front Row Center
- Manhattan Spotlight
- Newsweek Views the News
- The O'Neills
- Starlit Time
- The Vincent Lopez Show
- Windy City Jamboree

=== NBC ===
**Returning Series**

- The Aldrich Family
- Armstrong Circle Theatre
- Bonny Maid Versatile Varieties
- Break the Bank
- Camel News Caravan
- Cameo Theatre
- Candid Camera
- The Clock
- Fireside Theatre
- Garroway at Large
- Gillette Cavalcade of Sports
- Greatest Fights of the Century
- The Halls of Ivy
- Hawkins Falls
- The Jack Carter Show
- Kay Kyser's Kollege of Musical Knowledge
- Kraft Television Theatre
- Kukla, Fran and Ollie
- Leave It to the Girls
- Lights Out
- The Little Show
- Martin Kane, Private Eye
- The Mohawk Showroom
- One Man's Family
- The Original Amateur Hour
- Quiz Kids
- The Philco Television Playhouse
- Robert Montgomery Presents
- Screen Directors Playhouse
- The Texaco Star Theater
- The Voice of Firestone
- The Wayne King Show
- We, the People
- Who Said That?
- Your Hit Parade
- Your Show of Shows

**New Series**

- **The Colgate Comedy Hour**
- **Four Star Revue**
- **The Hank McCune Show**
- **Henry Morgan's Great Talent Hunt** *
- **The Jack Benny Program**
- **The Kate Smith Evening Hour**
- **Musical Comedy Time**
- **Robert Montgomery Presents**
- **Saturday Roundup** *
- **Seven at Eleven** *
- **Short Story Playhouse** *
- **Somerset Maugham TV Theatre**
- **The Speidel Show** *
- **Stars Over Hollywood**
- **The Straw Hat Matinee** *
- **Tag the Gag** *
- **Take a Chance**
- **Watch Mr. Wizard** *
- **You Bet Your Life**
- **Your Hit Parade** *

Not returning from 1949–50:

- The Black Robe
- Chevrolet Tele-Theater
- Cities Service Band of America
- Colgate Theatre
- The Crisis
- Fireball Fun-For-All
- Hopalong Cassidy
- Leon Pearson and the News
- The Marshal of Gunsight Pass
- Mary Kay and Johnny
- Masterpiece Playhouse
- Meet the Press
- Meet Your Congress
- Mixed Doubles
- The Nature of Things
- Theatre of the Mind

Note: The * indicates that the program was introduced in midseason.
