= Manhattan Spotlight =

American TV talk show (1949–1951)

- Starring: Charles Tranum (host)
- Country of origin: United States

Production
- Running time: 15 minutes

Original release
- Network: DuMont
- Release: January 17, 1949 – April 20, 1951

Manhattan Spotlight is an American television interview program that was broadcast on the DuMont Television Network from January 17, 1949, to April 20, 1951. Approximately 450 episodes were broadcast.

== Broadcast history ==
The series was an interview show hosted by Charles Tranum, who was the chief announcer for DuMont. Subjects of his interviews included "ordinary citizens and smalltime entertainers with interesting hobbies and talents. Topics of episodes included bop music, diamond cutting, jet propulsion, and seeing-eye dogs. A jet pilot appeared in his full flight equipment as an Air Force surgeon explained how the equipment kept the pilot conscious at high altitudes. A milliner presented a display of hats for men and women.

Manhattan Spotlight began as a daytime program. As a nighttime broadcast, it was seen in various time slots including Wednesdays from 10 to 10:15 p.m. Eastern Time (April 1950 - May 1950) and Wednesdays from 10:15 to 10:30 p.m. E. T. (May 1950-June 1950). Additionally, it was broadcast in some late-night slots and at times was aired only locally in New York. DuMont television sets and Dictaphone Corporation were the sponsors. The show originated from WABD-TV. Verne Tranum was the producer, and Pat Fay was the director.

From December 1949 to June 1950, Easy Aces aired in the Wednesday 7:45pm slot. During the 1950-1951 season, the Hazel Scott, Joan Edwards, and Susan Raye shows all ran in the 7:45pm ET slot immediately after Manhattan Spotlight.

Tranum and the show's co-producers ended it in 1951, and DuMont replaced the series with local (non-network) programming.

== See also ==
- List of programs broadcast by the DuMont Television Network
- List of surviving DuMont Television Network broadcasts

== Bibliography ==
- David Weinstein, The Forgotten Network: DuMont and the Birth of American Television (Philadelphia: Temple University Press, 2004) ISBN 1-59213-245-6
