= Take a Chance =

Take a Chance may refer to:

== Film, television and theatre ==
=== Film ===
- Take a Chance (1918 film), an American silent comedy directed by Hal Roach
- Take a Chance (1933 film), an American adaptation of the 1932 musical (see below)
- Take a Chance (1937 film), a British adaptation of the 1931 play (see below)
- Take a Chance, a 2006 film featuring Kirby Heyborne

=== Television ===
- Take a Chance (American game show), 1950
- Take a Chance (Canadian game show), a radio quiz show and 1960s TV quiz show
- Take a Chance, a 1959 Australian game show

=== Theatre ===
- Take a Chance (musical), a 1932 Broadway comedy by B. G. De Sylva, Nacio Herb Brown, and Richard A. Whiting
- Take a Chance (play), a 1931 West End comedy by Walter C. Hackett

== Music ==
=== Albums ===
- Take a Chance (Joanne Brackeen album) or the title composition, 1994
- Take a Chance (Stockton's Wing album) or the title song, 1980
- Take a Chance, by Ardijah, 1988
- Take a Chance, an EP by AB6IX, 2022

=== Songs ===
- "Take a Chance" (Olivia Newton-John and John Travolta song), 1983
- "Take a Chance" (Robin Bengtsson song), 2020
- "Take a Chance" (Scouting for Girls song), 2010
- "Take a Chance", by the Magic Numbers from Those the Brokes, 2006
- "Take a Chance", by melody. from the single "realize"/"Take a Chance", 2005
- "Take a Chance", by Michael Brady, an opening theme for Yu-Gi-Oh! Zexal, 2011
- "Take a Chance", by Monica from New Life, 2012
- "Take a Chance", by Ratt from Dancing Undercover, 1986

== See also ==
- Take a Chance on Me (disambiguation)
