= 1950 in television =

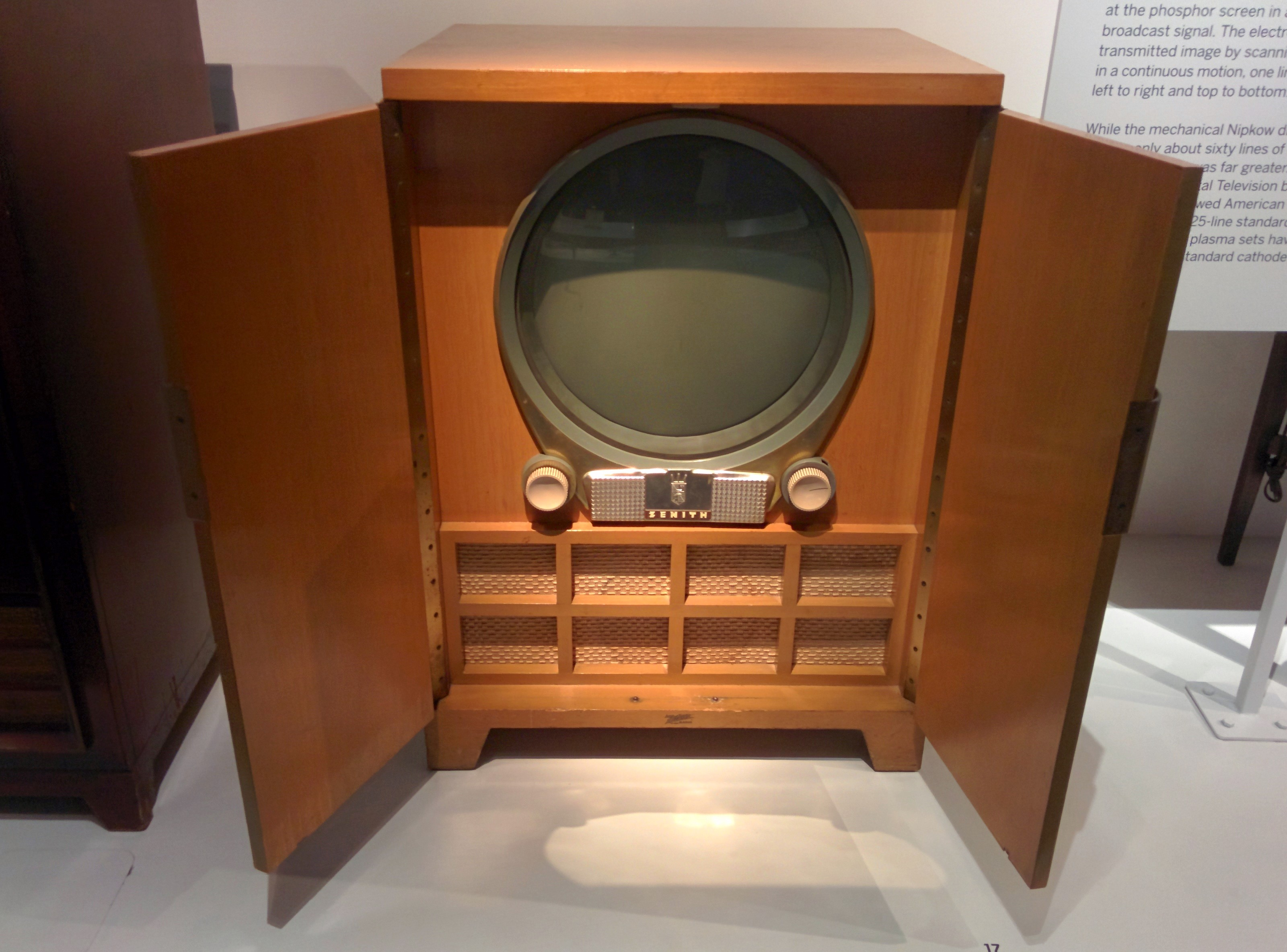
A Zenith H-24-37-E television set, from around 1950.

The year 1950 in television involved some significant events. Below is a list of television-related events during 1950.

== Events ==
- February – European Broadcasting Union (EBU) inaugurated.
- February 15
  - KENS began transmissions as KEYL. It was the second television station to sign on in the San Antonio market.
  - WSTM-TV began transmissions as WSYR-TV. It was Syracuse's second television station, signing on a year and three months after WHEN-TV (now WTVH).
- February 21 – WOI-TV signs on the air as Iowa's second television station (following WOC-TV, now KWQC-TV), and the first in the Des Moines area.
- February 23 – First televised report of general election results in the United Kingdom.
- March 27 – WHAS-TV signs on the air. It was the second television station to sign on in the Louisville market and the Commonwealth of Kentucky.
- April 2 – WTKR began operations on channel 4 as WTAR-TV. It was Hampton Roads' first television station and the second television station in Virginia, after WTVR (channel 6) in Richmond.
- April 4 – The BBC Television (UK) aspect ratio changes from 5:4 to 4:3.
- May 1 – WLNS-TV began transmissions as WJIM-TV. It is Michigan's second-oldest television station outside Detroit.
- May – Desilu Productions formed by Desi Arnaz and Lucille Ball in the United States.
- June 1 – WWMT signs on the air as WKZO-TV. It was West Michigan's second television station to debut after WLAV-TV (channel 7, now WOOD-TV channel 8 in Grand Rapids).
- June 17 – WAND (at this time called WTVP) goes on the air in Decatur, Illinois.
- July 1 – WHBF-TV signs on the air. It is the fifth-oldest surviving station in Illinois, and the oldest outside Chicago.
- July 26 – First television broadcast station in Mexico, XHTV, Mexico City on channel 4; Gonzalo Castellot Madrazo is the first announcer to appear.
- September 18 – First television network in South America launches, PRF-TV on channel 3 in São Paulo, Brazil.
- September 30
  - First BBC television broadcast from an aircraft.
  - WSMV-TV began transmissions as WSM-TV at 1:10 pm CT. It was Nashville's first television station and the second in Tennessee.
- October 10 – The U.S. Federal Communications Commission approves CBS's color television system, effective November 20.
- October 25 - Cuba signs on to television as Havana's Union Radio TV signs on for the first time, the first television station in the Caribbean.

== New shows ==
- January 4 – Abe Burrows' Almanac debuts on CBS (1950).
- January 11 - I Cover Times Square debuts on ABC (1950-1951).
- February 2 – What's My Line (1950) debuts on CBS (1950–1967).
- February 25 – Your Show of Shows premieres on NBC (1950–1954).
- March 23 – Beat the Clock premieres on CBS (1950–1961).
- June 17–October 12 – Hawkins Falls premieres on NBC (1951–1955).
- July 3 - The Hazel Scott Show on the DuMont Television Network (1950).
- July 3 - Menasha the Magnificent on NBC (1950).
- July 6 - Ford Star Revue premieres on NBC as the summer replacement for Kay Kyser's Kollege of Musical Knowledge.
- July 10 – Your Hit Parade premieres on NBC.
- July 11 – Andy Pandy premieres on the BBC (1950, 1970, 2002).
- September 5 – The Cisco Kid, starring Duncan Renaldo and Leo Carrillo, premieres (1950-1956).
- September 6 – Stars Over Hollywood premieres on NBC (1950-1951).
- September 7 – The game show Truth or Consequences debuts (1950–1988).
- September 10 – The Colgate Comedy Hour series debuts on NBC (1950-1955).
- September 18 – The Paul Winchell Show debuts on NBC with the title The Speidel Show.
- October 4 – Four Star Revue debuts on NBC (1950–1953).
- October 5 – The comedy quiz show You Bet Your Life, featuring Groucho Marx, premieres (1950–1961).
- October 12 – The George Burns and Gracie Allen Show debuts (1950–1958).
- October 28 – The Jack Benny Program, starring Jack Benny, premieres (1950–1965).

== Television series ==
Series	Debut	Ended
Picture Page (UK)	October 10, 1936	1939
Picture Page (UK)	1945	1952
For The Children (UK)	April 26, 1937	1939
For The Children (UK)	July 7, 1946	1950
The Voice of Firestone Televues	1943	1947
The Voice of Firestone Televues	1949	1963
Kaleidoscope (UK)	November 2, 1946	1953
Gillette Cavalcade of Sports	November 8, 1946	June 24, 1960
Muffin the Mule (UK)	1946	1955
You Are an Artist	1946	1950
Kraft Television Theatre	May 7, 1947	1958
Kukla, Fran and Ollie	October 13, 1947	1957
Meet the Press	November 6, 1947	—
Mary Kay and Johnny	November 18, 1947	March 11, 1950
Howdy Doody	December 27, 1947	September 24, 1960
Café Continental (UK)	1947	1953
Juvenile Jury	1947	1954
Small Fry Club	1947	1951
Television Newsreel (UK)	January 5, 1948	1954
The Original Amateur Hour	January 18, 1948	September 27, 1970
Court of Current Issues	February 9, 1948	June 26, 1951
Author Meets the Critics	April 1948	October 10, 1954
Hollywood Screen Test	April 15, 1948	1953
Texaco Star Theater	June 8, 1948	1953
The Ed Sullivan Show	June 20, 1948	June 6, 1971
Candid Camera	August 10, 1948	2014
CBS Evening News	August 15, 1948	—
Foodini the Great	August 23, 1948	June 23, 1951
Actors Studio	September 1948	June 1950
Ford Theatre	October 17, 1948	July 10, 1957
The Morey Amsterdam Show	December 17, 1948	October 12, 1950
The Alan Dale Show	1948	1951
Arthur Godfrey's Talent Scouts	1948	January 1, 1958
Break the Bank	1948	1957
Cartoon TeleTales	1948	1950
Celebrity Time	1948	September 1952
Club Seven	1948	1951
The Philco Television Playhouse	1948	1955
Winner Take All	1948	1952
The Goldbergs	January 17, 1949	1956
Ripley's Believe It or Not!	March 1, 1949	October 5, 1950
Think Fast	March 26, 1949	October 8, 1950
Captain Video	June 27, 1949	April 1, 1955
Mama	July 1, 1949	March 17, 1957
Martin Kane, Private Eye	August 7, 1949	June 17, 1954
The Little Revue	September 4, 1949	April 21, 1950
The Lone Ranger	September 15, 1949	June 6, 1957
Come Dancing (UK)	September 29, 1949	1995
The Aldrich Family	October 2, 1949	May 29, 1953
The Life of Riley	October 4, 1949	March 28, 1950
The Life of Riley	January 2, 1953	August 22, 1958
The Ruggles	November 3, 1949	June 19, 1952
One Man's Family	November 4, 1949	June 21, 1952
One Man's Family	March 1, 1954	April 1, 1955
Arthur Godfrey and His Friends	1949	1959
What's My Line?	February 2, 1950	1975
Your Show of Shows	February 25, 1950	June 5, 1954
Hawkins Falls	June 17, 1950	July 1, 1955
Your Hit Parade	July 10, 1950	1959
Your Hit Parade	1974	1974
Andy Pandy (UK)	July 11, 1950	1970
Andy Pandy (UK)	2002	2005
Truth or Consequences	September 7, 1950	1988
The Colgate Comedy Hour	September 10, 1950	December 25, 1955
You Bet Your Life	October 5, 1950	1961
The George Burns and Gracie Allen Show	October 12, 1950	1958
The Jack Benny Program	October 28, 1950	1965
The Adventures of Ellery Queen	1950	1959
The Adventures of Ellery Queen	1975	1976
The Cisco Kid	September 5, 1950	March 22, 1956

== Programs ending during 1950 ==
Date	Show	Debut
March 11	Mary Kay and Johnny	1947
March 29	Abe Burrows' Almanac	1950
June 23	Actors Studio	1948
Unknown	Cartoon Teletales	1948
Unknown	For The Children (UK)	1946
Unknown	You Are an Artist	1946

== Births ==
Date	Name	Notability
January 3	Victoria Principal	Actress (Dallas)
January 7	Erin Gray	Actress (Buck Rogers in the 25th Century, Silver Spoons)
January 16	Debbie Allen	Actress, dancer, choreographer (Fame)
January 23	Richard Dean Anderson	Actor (MacGyver)
January 25	John Terry	Actor (Las Vegas, Lost)
January 29	Ann Jillian	Actress (It's a Living)
January 30	Trinidad Silva	Actor (died 1988)
February 3	Morgan Fairchild	Actress (Flamingo Road)
February 3	Pamela Franklin	Actress
February 12	Michael Ironside	Actor (ER, Walker, Texas Ranger, Smallville, Superman: The Animated Series)
February 14	Frank Collison	Actor (Dr. Quinn, Medicine Woman)
February 15	Donna Hanover	American journalist
February 17	Lynne Moody	Actress (That's My Mama, Knots Landing)
February 18	Cybill Shepherd	Actress (Moonlighting, Cybill)
February 22	Julius Erving	NBA basketball player
February 22	Julie Walters	Actress
February 24	Evelyn Guerrero	American actress
February 26	Bill Ritter	American journalist
March 2	Matthew Laurance	Actor (Saturday Night Live, Beverly Hills, 90210)
March 3	Tim Kazurinsky	Actor (Saturday Night Live)
March 10	Aloma Wright	Actress (Scrubs, Days of Our Lives)
March 12	Jon Provost	Actor (Lassie)
March 13	William H. Macy	Actor (Shameless, ER, The Lionhearts, Curious George)
March 13	Charles Krauthammer	American political columnist (died 2018)
March 18	Brad Dourif	Actor
March 18	Jim Knobeloch	Actor (Dr. Quinn, Medicine Woman)
March 20	William Hurt	Actor (died 2022)
March 23	Terry Sweeney	Actor, comedian (Saturday Night Live, Hype)
March 26	Martin Short	Canadian-American actor, comedian (SCTV, Saturday Night Live)
March 26	Tony Papenfuss	Actor (Newhart)
March 30	Robbie Coltrane	Actor (died 2022)
March 31	Ed Marinaro	Football player, actor (Hill Street Blues, Blue Mountain State)
April 4	Christine Lahti	Actress (Chicago Hope)
April 12	David Cassidy	Actor, singer (The Partridge Family) (died 2017)
April 12	Tom Werner	Producer
April 13	Ron Perlman	Actor (Beauty and the Beast, Sons of Anarchy, Teen Titans, Adventure Time)
April 13	William Sadler	Actor (Roswell)
April 14	Randolph Powell	Actor (Logan's Run, Dallas)
April 17	L. Scott Caldwell	Actress (Lost)
April 28	Jay Leno	Comedian, talk show host (The Tonight Show)
April 28	Stuart Gillard	Writer
May 1	Dann Florek	Actor (Law & Order, Law & Order: Special Victims Unit)
May 7	Tim Russert	American television journalist (died 2008)
May 9	Marcheline Bertrand	American actress (died 2007)
May 12	Bruce Boxleitner	Actor (Scarecrow and Mrs. King, Babylon 5)
May 12	Gabriel Byrne	Actor
May 13	Stevie Wonder	Singer and musician
May 15	Nicholas Hammond	American-born Australian actor (The Amazing Spider-Man)
May 18	Mark Mothersbaugh	American composer
May 28	Denny Delk	American Voice Actor (Wicket W. Warrick, Ewoks (TV series))
May 31	Gregory Harrison	Actor (Trapper John, M.D.)
June 1	John M. Jackson	Actor (JAG)
June 3	Melissa Mathison	American film and television screenwriter (died 2015)
June 5	Daniel von Bargen	American character actor (died 2015)
June 8	Kathy Baker	Actress (Picket Fences)
June 13	Belinda Bauer	Australian actress
June 19	Rosie Shuster	Canadian-born comedy writer and actress
June 20	Les Gold	American pawnbroker
June 26	Michael Paul Chan	Actor
July 5	Huey Lewis	Actor
July 10	Nick Jameson	Actor (24, Lost)
July 11	Bruce McGill	Actor
July 21	Jordan Clarke	Actor (Guiding Light)
July 23	Belinda Montgomery	Actress (Man from Atlantis, Miami Vice, Doogie Howser, M.D.)
August 3	Jo Marie Payton	Actress (Perfect Strangers, Family Matters, The Proud Family)
August 3	John Landis	Actor
August 11	Steve Wozniak	American electronics engineer
August 12	Jim Beaver	Actor (Supernatural)
August 13	Jane Carr	Actress
September 1	Phil McGraw	Television host (Dr. Phil)
September 2	Harvey Levin	Television producer
September 5	Kathy Cronkite	Actress
September 7	Julie Kavner	Actress (Marge Simpson on The Simpsons)
September 9	Joe Lisi	Actor (Third Watch)
September 11	Amy Madigan	Actress
September 12	Bruce Mahler	Actor (Seinfeld)
September 18	Anna Deavere Smith	Actress
September 19	Joan Lunden	American TV host
September 21	Bill Murray	Actor, comedian (Saturday Night Live)
September 24	Alan Colmes	Political commentator (Hannity & Colmes, Fox News Watch) (died 2017)
September 27	Cary-Hiroyuki Tagawa	Actor
September 30	Vondie Curtis-Hall	Actor, director (Chicago Hope)
October 2	Ian McNeice	Actor
October 3	Pamela Hensley	Actress (Buck Rogers in the 25th Century, Matt Houston)
October 4	Alan Rosenberg	Actor (L.A. Law, Civil Wars)
October 5	Jeff Conaway	Actor (Taxi) (died 2011)
October 9	Gary Frank	Actor (Family)
October 17	Howard Rollins	Actor (In the Heat of the Night) (died 1996)
October 20	William Russ	Actor (Boy Meets World)
October 31	John Candy	Canadian comedian and actor (SCTV) (died 1994)
October 31	Jane Pauley	American television host
November 4	Markie Post	Actress (The Fall Guy, Night Court, Hearts Afire) (died 2021)
November 8	Mary Hart	American television personality
November 10	Jack Scalia	Actor
November 13	Jules Sylvester	Actor, animal trainer, television presenter (1000 Ways to Die, Black-ish)
November 16	David Leisure	Actor (Empty Nest)
November 18	Dennis Haskins	Actor (Saved by the Bell)
November 22	Steven Van Zandt	Actor
November 23	Chuck Schumer	Politician
November 24	Stanley Livingston	Actor (My Three Sons)
November 28	Ed Harris	Actor (Westworld)
December 6	Thom Barry	Actor (Cold Case)
December 13	Lindsey Ginter	Actor (Lost)
December 13	Wendie Malick	Actress (Dream On, Just Shoot Me!, Hot in Cleveland, The Owl House)
December 21	Jane How	Actress

== Television debuts ==
- Richard Alexander – The Gene Autry Show
- Robert Armstrong – The Silver Theatre
- Madeleine Carroll – Robert Montgomery Presents
- Finlay Currie – Sunday Night Theatre
- Frank Darien – The Chevrolet Tele-Theatre
- Frances Dee – Fireside Theatre
- Stuart Erwin – The Stu Erwin Show
- Kay Francis – Prudential Family Playhouse
- Rex Harrison – The Chevrolet Tele-Theatre
- Nancy Kelly – The Silver Theatre
- June Lang – Fireside Theatre
- Robert Montgomery – Robert Montgomery Presents
- Franklin Pangborn – The Ken Murray Show
- Gene Raymond – Pulitzer Prize Playhouse
- Penny Singleton – Pulitzer Prize Playhouse
