= Anna Demetrio =

Italian-born American film actress

- Born: 8 November 1890; Rome, Italy
- Died: 8 November 1959 (aged 69); San Mateo, California, United States
- Occupation: Actress
- Years active: 1933-1952 (film & TV)

Anna Demetrio (1890–1959) was an Italian-born American film actress. Speaking English with a heavy accent, she often played stock foreign characters in a series of supporting roles. In 1950 she starred in the sitcom Mama Rosa in which she played the title character.

== Selected filmography ==
- Too Much Harmony (1933)
- Manhattan Merry-Go-Round (1937)
- In Old Mexico (1938)
- Escape to Paradise (1939)
- Young Buffalo Bill (1940)
- Miss V from Moscow (1942)
- Submarine Base (1943)
- Dragon Seed (1944)
- Call of the South Seas (1944)
- Appointment with Murder (1948)
- September Affair (1950)
- Bandit Queen (1950)

== Bibliography ==
- McLaughlin, Robert. We'll Always Have the Movies: American Cinema during World War II. University Press of Kentucky, 2006.
