= Take a Chance on Me (disambiguation) =

"Take a Chance on Me" is a song by ABBA.

Take a Chance on Me may also refer to:

- "Take a Chance on Me" (JLS song), 2011
- Take a Chance on Me (novel), a book in the Gossip Girl series
- "Take a Chance on Me", a song from the 2005 musical Little Women

== See also ==
- Take a Chance (disambiguation)
