= Hal Block =

American comedian (1913-1981)

- Block on What's My Line?
- Born: Harold Leonard Block; August 3, 1913; Chicago, Illinois, U.S.
- Died: June 16, 1981 (aged 67); Chicago, Illinois, U.S.
- Education: University of Chicago
- Occupations: Writer, comedian, producer, screenwriter, songwriter
- Years active: 1936 – c. 1959

Harold Leonard Block (August 3, 1913 – June 16, 1981) was an American comedy writer, comedian, producer, songwriter and television personality. Although Block was a highly successful comedy writer for over 15 years, today he is most often remembered as an original panelist of the television game show What's My Line? who was fired from the show in its third season, reportedly for inappropriate on-air behavior. Block is a controversial figure in the history of television, denounced by some, while praised by others as a writer and for contributing to the original success of What's My Line?.

During the 1940s, Block was considered one of America's best comedy writers, having worked for many of the top comedians of the era, such as Bob Hope, Abbott and Costello, Martin and Lewis, Milton Berle and Burns and Allen and in all major media, including radio, Hollywood movies, Broadway and print. Block also made major contributions to the USO during World War II.

In March 1950, producers of the new game show What's My Line? hired Block for its fourth episode to add humor to the show's format. With a panel previously consisting of a journalist, a psychiatrist, a politician and a poet, reviewers had criticized the show as bland. After a rocky start, What's My Line? became one of the top-rated shows on television. Critics praised his work; the Chicago Sun-Times called Block the "freshest new personality in TV."

His humor could be risqué, however, which antagonized some conservative 1950s viewers. He once risked the sponsor's wrath, referring to their deodorant with the line "Make your armpit a charmpit." In early 1953, Block was suspended and then fired. He left show business for the investment business a few years later, while What's My Line? continued on as a staple of Sunday night television for another 14 years.

== Background ==
Block was born to a Jewish family on August 3, 1913, in Chicago and raised in the Hyde Park area.

According to Gil Fates, executive producer of the What's My Line? television game show, there were rumors Block had come from a wealthy family.

Three comedy writing contemporaries of Block, Melvin Frank, Norman Panama, and Bob Weiskopf, also came from Hyde Park. Block attended the University of Chicago High School, graduating in 1930, and then the University of Chicago where he majored in law, graduating in 1935. At the University of Chicago he was co-captain of the university track team, running the 100 and 220 yard sprints, member of Zeta Beta Tau (Alpha Beta, Chicago) fraternity, and editor of the university humor magazine.

=== Phil Baker ===
Block had paid his way through college selling material to comedian and radio emcee Phil Baker at $20 a joke ($300 in 2010 dollars).

While still in college, he was Baker's head writer. Nonetheless, getting into Baker's employ had required persistence and some chicanery. Block originally met Baker when he and his then writing partner, Phil Cole, introduced themselves while Baker was performing in Chicago. Based upon Baker's dismissive "Sure, sure, next time you're in New York look me up" the two promptly followed him to New York. Informed by his agent that he didn't know where Baker was, they went to every likely restaurant leaving the message "When Mr. Baker comes in, tell him that Block and Cole are here."

Eventually discovering the suburb where Baker resided, but not the address, they devised the ruse of pretending to send him a wire from the local telegraph office. The attendant noticed the recipient and said "Why, Mr. Baker lives just a few blocks from here!" At Baker's home they told the maid, "Tell Mr. Baker that Block and Cole are here." Angered by all the restaurant messages, Baker charged to the door demanding "Who are Block and Cole, anyway?"

Amused by the response that they were "his new writers", Baker met them at his offices the next day. Reading the script, they suggested a joke for his show, but once again he sent them on their way. Despondent and halfway back to Chicago they listened to Baker's radio show, which included their joke. They turned the car around and armed with a new comedy routine were subsequently hired. After two years of studying law, Block quit for the profession of comedy writing.

== Writing career ==
Block was considered one of the best writers of comedic radio scripts of the 1940s. During his days as a comedy writer, Time magazine described Block as a "serious, curly-haired, stocky ... gag-factory" who "resembles actor Edward G. Robinson".

=== Radio, Broadway, Hollywood ===
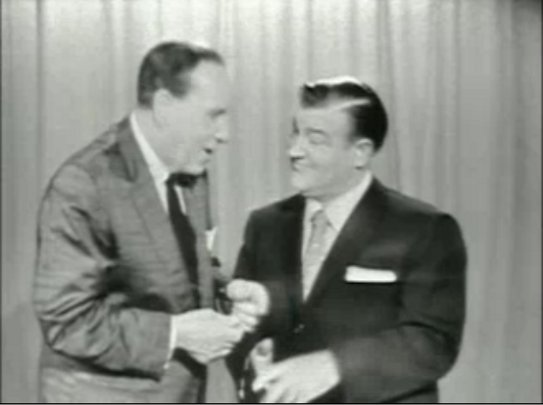
Block wrote for Abbott and Costello early in his writing career

The 1930s and 1940s were the Golden Age of radio and there were significant financial rewards to be made for those writing for radio comedy programs. Phil Baker, for whom Block was the head writer, reportedly spent $1,500 per week on his three writers, equivalent to $24,000 in 2010 dollars. Never the less, the failure rate of those attempting to make it a career was high. Despite the risk, and against his father's expressed wishes, in 1935 Block abandoned the study of law and moved to New York City. He was able to achieve immediate success, being hired by the comedy team of Abbott and Costello. He also continued to write for Phil Baker, for whom he would write even into the 1940s, including Baker's hit game show, Take It or Leave It. By 1937, he was so busy as a writer that in September he had only three hours to stop off in Chicago for his parents' anniversary party before continuing by train to Hollywood, writing for Baker's radio show.

In the years that followed, Block would establish his reputation by writing for many of the top comedians in radio, including Bob Hope, Burns and Allen, Eddie Cantor, Dean Martin, Jerry Lewis and Milton Berle.

In the early 1940s, with the world at war and the Depression still a recent memory, light-hearted musical comedies were popular and Block found his humor skills in demand for Broadway musicals and Hollywood movies. As early as 1939, he contributed dialog and music to the film Charlie McCarthy, Detective. In 1940, he wrote the low-budget Universal film musical I'm Nobody's Sweetheart Now and contributed to the script for 1943's Stage Door Canteen. He also made contributions to successful Broadway shows, such as By Jupiter, Let's Face It!, and Follow the Girls. In 1941, he was hired to write dialogue for the Broadway revue Sons O'Fun, Olsen and Johnson's sequel to their hit show Hellzapoppin. Sons O'Fun ran for 742 performances.

Block also showed an instinct for financial opportunities. During the test run in Boston of Follow the Girls, Fred Thompson, the show's principal writer, lost faith in the show and sold his shares to Block for $3,000. The show, starring a young Jackie Gleason, became a wartime hit and a huge financial success.

Block was also a columnist and wrote articles for various publications, including Variety, Collier's and the Chicago Daily News.

=== USO ===
Late in 1942 and through most of 1943, Block's career was interrupted by his participation with the USO. Just prior to U.S. involvement in World War Two, President Roosevelt spearheaded the formation of the United Service Organizations to provide entertainment for American servicemen both at home and in war zones. In November 1942, Block wrote an all-star revue for the USO to be performed for the growing American Expeditionary Forces in England. Hollywood stars who volunteered to stay in England for two months to perform in the revue included Carole Landis, Kay Francis, Mitzi Mayfair, and Martha Raye. In December, the Office of War Information sent Block to London to prepare radio broadcasts and write jokes for touring American stars who performed for the troops stationed in England. He soon discovered that writing for soldiers, British and American, required a specialized technique and he studied British humor to understand how it differed from American humor both in language and taste. Also, a military audience required unique sensitivities as soldiers did not laugh at subjects such as strikes in wartime industries, shortages endured by civilians, or especially, cheating wives. He also wrote some American-slanted material for British comedian Tommy Trinder.

==== With the BBC ====
Block was then assigned to the staff at the BBC to add American comedic sensibility to the Anglo-American Hour and Yankee Doodle Doo radio programs. Maurice Gorham, BBC executive and journalist who had "seen a lot of Block" during his BBC days, gave his impressions of Block as "a real Broadway type who reminded me of a Damon Runyon character suddenly set down in a Broadcasting House." His contribution to the BBC was once singled out by the North American Representative of the BBC, Lindsay Wellington, to dispute Associated Press accusations of excessive British censorship. In a December 6, 1943, letter to the New York Times he wrote, "Nor would it have been possible for Hal Block, American scriptwriter, to write the highly popular London-produced program for combined U.S. and British soldier audiences Yankee Doodle Doo."

Block made use of his Broadway experience in musical comedy. Block and UPI correspondent and lyricist Bob Musel wrote the popular song The U.S.A. By Day And The R.A.F. By Night for the Eighth Air Force show. The song has been called "the most entertaining song about the war in Europe." The song was unique in taking the approach of praising US and British airmen indirectly by focusing on the horrified laments of members of the Nazi High Command. With a sardonic tone, it featured everyone from Hitler to Rommel bemoaning the effects of the Allied bombing. On one occasion, Block sang the song over BBC radio and when trying to leave the building after the broadcast found himself in the middle of an actual air raid. An excerpt:

An officer asks the arms manufacturer,

Krupp, why are you worried,
What is your fact'ry's plight?

Krupp replies,

It was standing here one day,
then it disappeared one night.

Block also wrote the humorous song Baby, That's a Wolf, sung by Rosalind Russell. Russell wanted to do something beyond the ordinary to entertain the troops and Block wrote the song especially for her. With this song he has been credited with popularizing the term "wolf" in referring to a libidinous American male, An excerpt:

If he says your eyes are gorgeous

And that you're really cookin'–
But your eyes aren't where he's lookin'
Baby, that's a wolf!

==== With Bob Hope's USO tour ====
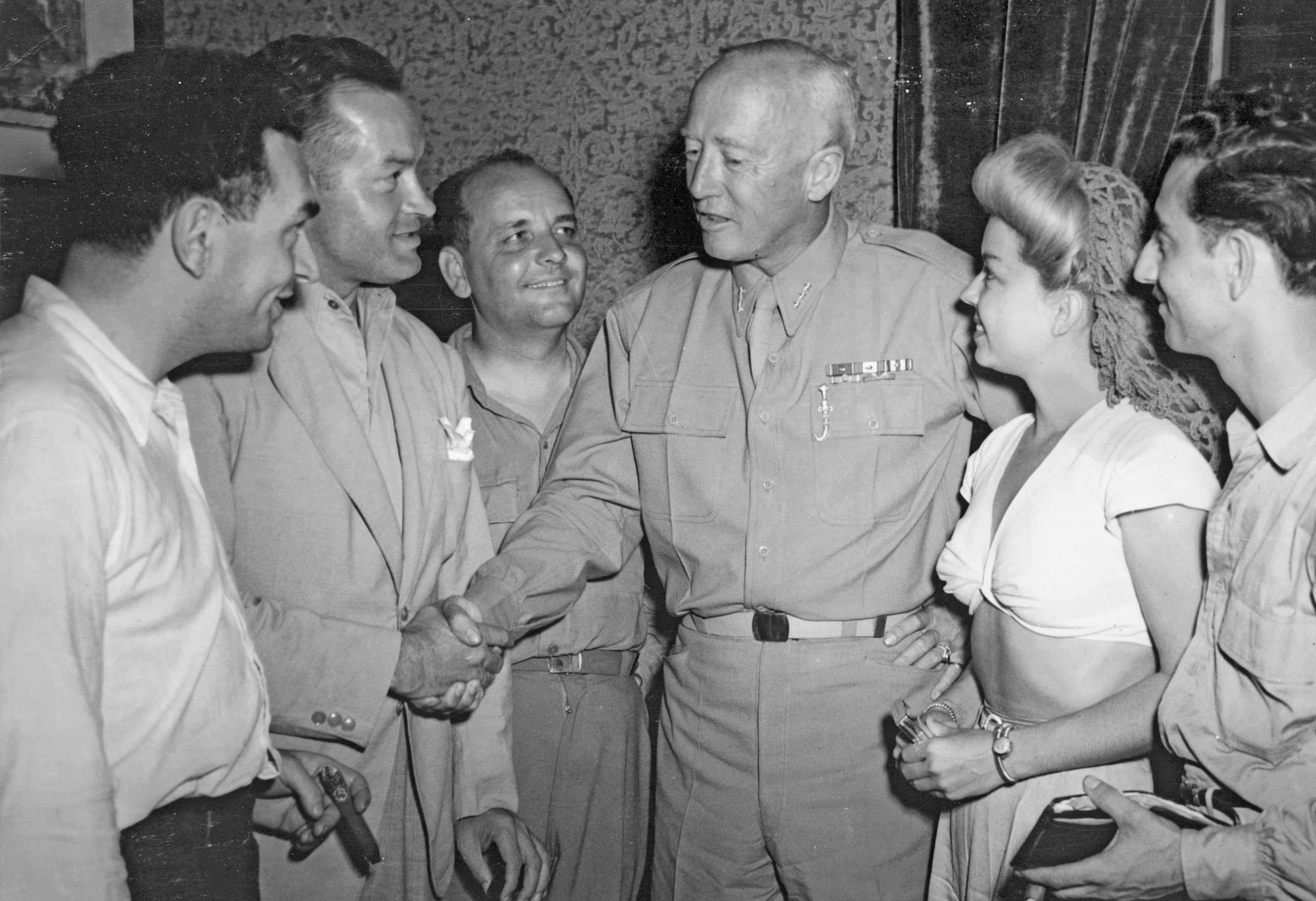
Hal Block (far left with cigar) with Bob Hope (second from left) who is shaking General George S. Patton's hand in Sicily on August 21, 1943; others in the photo are writer/actor Barney Dean, singer Frances Langford and singer Tony Romano

Through most of 1943, Block was Bob Hope's writer for Hope's first USO overseas tour. They entertained troops through England, Africa and Italy. Initially, when Hope began his tour he had to write all the jokes, until the USO assigned Block as his comedy writer. Hope said that after Block joined him "the jokes got a lot less shaky." Hope said Block had "learned to write funny in bomb shelters, jeeps, and on the backs of camels."

Working close to the war zone could be dangerous. Hope had followed General George Patton's 7th Army into Sicily and one time while Block and Hope were writing a script in a Palermo hotel, the Germans began a bombing raid. "We did a show and ran for our lives," said Block. Immediately after the incident, Patton sent Hope's troupe back to Algiers for their safety. On another occasion, Block was forced to travel alone in the storage compartment of a cargo plane and the crew tied him to the cargo for his own safety. It was only mid-flight when Block realized the boxes he was tied to were filled with live ammunition. There was also an unnerving episode where Block was taken by MPs to the OSS compound as a suspicious character. Block also escaped a real tragedy when he was originally to be a passenger on the ill-fated USO plane that crashed in February 1943, seriously injuring actress Jane Froman and killing 23 others.

The work was laborious and the conditions often spartan. Block and Hope would sometimes work until four in the morning writing and discussing material, only to head for a car or airfield at six to travel to another camp or hospital. On one occasion in Algiers, Block and Hope were contemplating their accommodations, wondering how they could spend the night sharing a room so small. John Steinbeck, at the time a war correspondent, overheard them complaining. "You'll think this is practically a bridal suite, when you compare it to my room," he told the two. They then followed Steinbeck downstairs to his room, which was half the size of theirs, and were introduced to journalists Quentin Reynolds and H.R. Knickerbocker. Hope noticed even a third man sleeping and asked his identity. "He's the British vice-consul," Steinbeck replied. "This is his room. He invited us to spend the night two weeks ago."

One of the highlights of the USO tour for Block was meeting General Eisenhower in Algiers during the North African campaign. Block almost missed out on the meeting, however, and required some assertive action on Block's part. Block was working on the rehearsal of a USO show when at one point realized the rest of Hope's group had disappeared. Block was enraged when he discovered they had left him behind while they went to meet General Eisenhower. Block rushed over to the hotel serving as Eisenhower's headquarters, only to see Hope's entire group descending the stairs, each with an autographed picture of the General. Block talked his way into meeting the General by telling Harry Butcher, at the time Naval Aide to Eisenhower, "Butch, the one keepsake I want out of this war is an autographed picture of the General for my grandkids." Block met General Eisenhower, introduced as "a man who helps make Bob Hope funny."

In August 1943, Block wrote and produced a unique version of Hope's radio show performed for Allied troops and Red Cross nurses from 'somewhere in North Africa'. So popular was the show, a recording was later broadcast twice over the BBC for British audiences.

=== Top of his profession ===
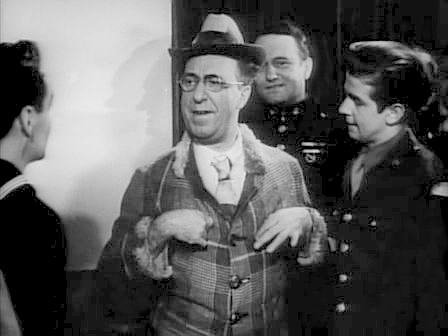
Returning from the USO, Block was the writer for Ed Wynn's return to radio after a ten-year absence. Wynn had been a pioneer of early radio.

Returning from Europe in 1944, Block resumed his writing career. Block was the producer, as well as writer, of Milton Berle's radio show, Let Yourself Go. The show was described as a "zany, exhibitionist program" similar to the children's game Forfeits, in which audience members and famous guests acted out unusual behavior. On one show, Berle promised to buy a $1,000 war bond if Opera Star Grace Moore would perform while standing on her head. With the help of Berle and announcer Kenneth Roberts holding her feet, she did a handstand as Block held the microphone while she sang. In September 1944, Block was the writer for Ed Wynn's program Happy Island, which was Wynn's return to radio after a decade's absence. Also in 1944, Block wrote the song Buy a Bond Today. Around 1948, Block wrote the material for an album for Dean Martin and Jerry Lewis that was to be used as their audition for entry into television. Block also attained what columnist Hedda Hopper described as a "cushy deal" at a major film studio.

By the late 1940s, Block was at the top of his profession. He was earning a four-figure weekly salary in a day when the average household income was just over $2,000 a year. He resided at the posh Hampshire House in the Central Park South area of New York City, a hotel that was home to Hollywood notables such as Frank Sinatra, Ingrid Bergman, Ava Gardner, and William Wyler. He even dictated his jokes to a secretary. Block's father remained unimpressed by his son's success. After attending a radio show Block had written, which ended with tumultuous applause from the studio audience, his father said, "Well, are you ready to go back to law school?"

=== The life of a comedy writer ===
Columnist Elsa Maxwell, commenting on Block's approach to writing, said he was "serious – almost academic – about being funny." Block was once asked what was the hardest material to write for a comedian. He quipped, "The ad libs!" While it was widely believed that emcee Phil Baker ad-libbed the popular game show Take It or Leave It (later renamed The $64 Question), most of the shows were actually written by Block. An example of what appears to be casual conversation, but was actually a joke written by Block, was for entertainer Kenny Murray to say to his television studio audience: "I don't care whether you laugh at my jokes or not. But it will be pretty embarrassing for you if people all over the country find out you don't have a sense of humor."

Lamenting the amount of comedy material a writer needs to supply for a weekly radio show, Block said, "The only difference between us and white mice on a wheel, is that we have ulcers." In order to meet the demand, Block did employ, at least on one occasion, other writers to assist him. Norman Barasch described Block giving him his first writing job at $75 a week when he ghost-wrote jokes for him while Block was head writer for Milton Berle and Ed Wynn.

It was not only the volume of material that was a challenge in writing for radio, but the reality that they were writing for more than simply the audience. It was an era when radio and television shows often had only a single sponsor and since the sponsor paid the show's bills the writer had to please them as well. Block expressed this double-edged sword with his definition of a sponsor as: "A golden goose for whom we lay the eggs." It didn't end with the sponsor. "We have to make the sponsor laugh," Block wrote in Collier's magazine "And besides pleasing the sponsor, we have to please the sponsor's wife, the producer, the men from the advertising agency, the radio and television critics and the Federal Communications Commission." Then there was the issue of radio censorship. Block once quipped that if he tried to produce a radio version of It Happened One Night, a film famous for a scene of an unmarried couple sharing a bedroom, it would end up being called It Didn't Happen One Night. Even during his time with the BBC, Block later recalled the occasion when a cannibal sketch he'd written was rejected by the British Home Office. The note justifying the rejection explained they objected to his depicting cannibals because they were "loyal subjects of the king and many of them are now aiding in the fight against the enemy." In this case, however, the rejection was reversed, apparently by an executive with a sense of humor, since the explanation for the reversal noted that the cannibals had also eaten many loyal subjects.

Block was also a critic of his profession. By the late 1940s, he'd become concerned about the state of comedy writing on the radio. In 1948, he wrote an article in Variety, which complained about the trend of game shows replacing comedy shows and specifically Fred Allen. In an article titled "You Can't Top a Refrigerator", he was disturbed that the high quality of the writing of Fred Allen's show could lose out to the chance to win prizes. He was also to argue for a comedy writer's rights. "Jokes are as hard to write as anything else, and anyone who wants to use them should be made to pay for them. The gag-writer should receive royalties in the same manner as the song writer", he said in 1951.

== Performer and the advent of television ==
By the 1950s, television had begun to supplant radio as the main form of entertainment in American homes.

In her column of October 11, 1945, Hedda Hopper wrote that Block had "mastered" radio, would likely do the same with movies, and "he'll be in a perfect position for television." Although Block attempted performing as early as 1939, it was not until the early 1950s that he began in earnest. In 1951, Block was disk jockey for his own twice-a-week radio program Around the Clock on WJZ in New York City, was moderator for the short-lived television game show, Tag the Gag, and hosted the show Four to Go on WGN in Chicago.

It was as one of the original panelists on the television game show What's My Line? from 1950–53 that gave Block national fame. What's My Line?, a guessing game in which the show's panel tried to discover the unusual profession of guests, became one of the most popular shows on television in the 1950s and ran for 17 seasons, making it the longest-running game show in the history of prime-time American television.

=== What's My Line? ===
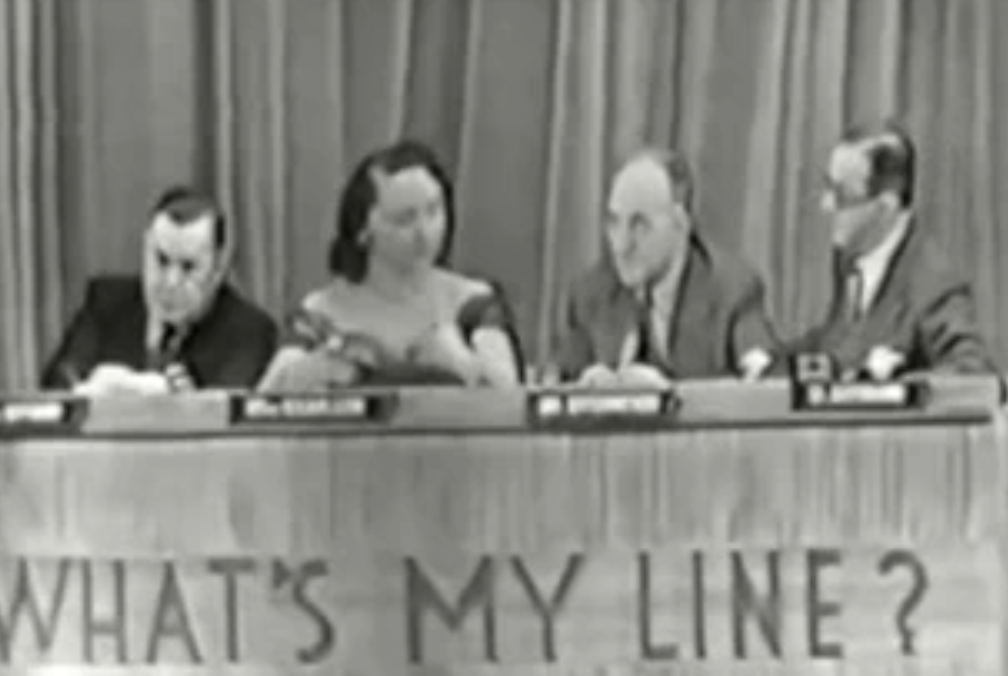
The cast of the premier broadcast of What's Line?, consisting of a politician, a journalist, a poet and a psychiatrist, was criticized as bland by television critics. Block joined on the fourth episode adding an element of humor.

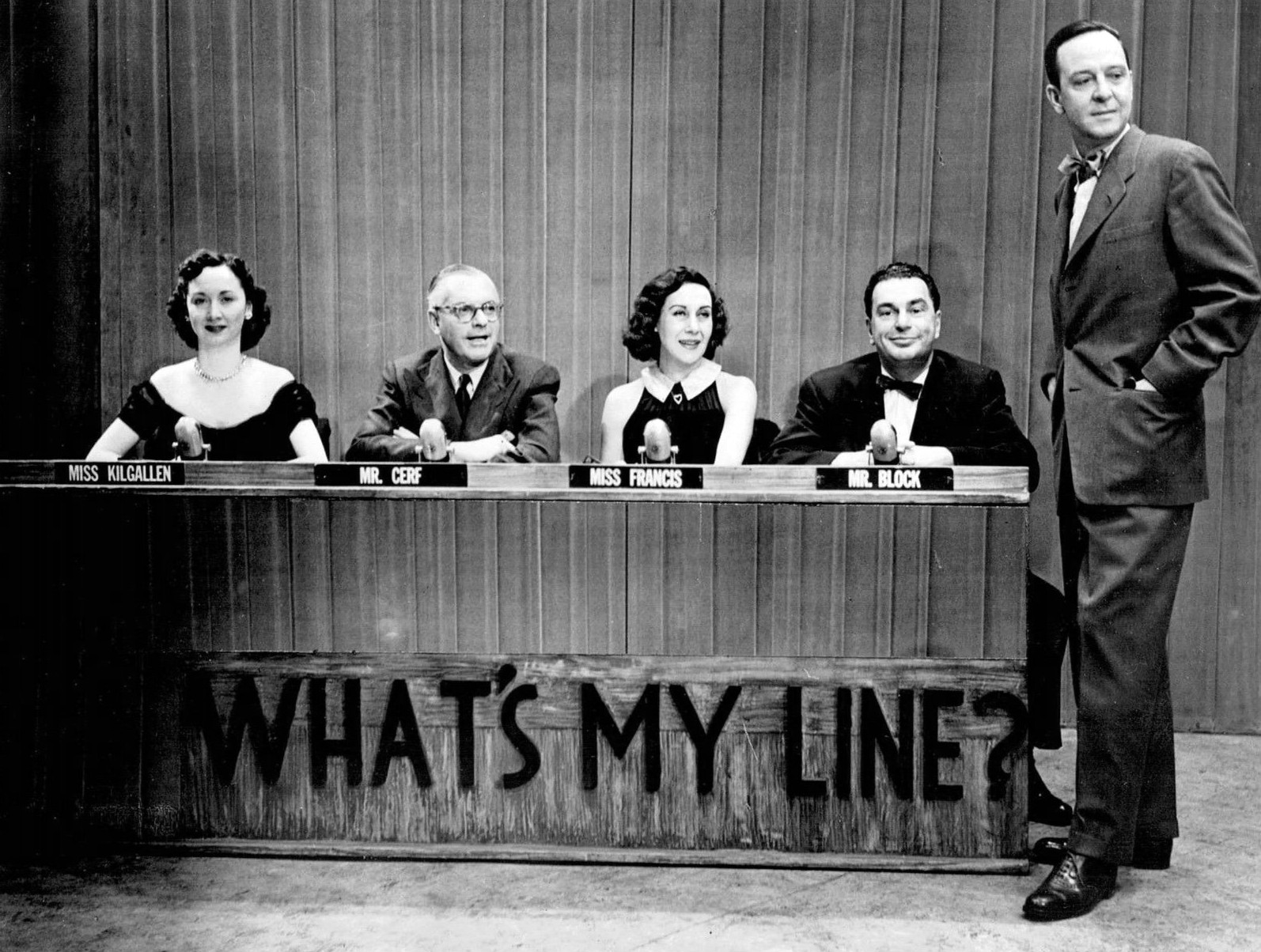
The What's My Line? panel in 1952. From left: Dorothy Kilgallen, Bennett Cerf, Arlene Francis and Hal Block, with John Daly as the host

On February 2, 1950, What's My Line? premiered on CBS with a panel consisting of journalist Dorothy Kilgallen; poet, anthologist, critic, and editor Louis Untermeyer; psychiatrist Richard H. Hoffmann; and politician Harold G. Hoffman. Journalist John Daly was host.

Some reviews of the first show criticized it as bland and colorless. Even Mark Goodson, one of the show's producers, said the early shows were "as dull as dishwater" and, years later, confessed to feeling at the time that the show wouldn't last more than six weeks. The producers quickly realized the problems lay with the casting and that the show needed some lighter elements.

Actress Arlene Francis was first brought onto the panel, and then on March 16, 1950, on the fourth show, Block replaced neuropsychiatrist Dr. Richard Hoffman. Block continued as a regular panelist for the next three years.

Block brought humor to What's My Line? On one show, upon a contestant being revealed to be a skunk breeder, Block was surprised they hadn't been able to guess his occupation because, "After all, the fellow had a certain air about him."

Block was able to bring levity to what may otherwise have been serious, dry topics, such as with the appearance of Estes Kefauver, a U.S. Senator who was leading an investigation into organized crime. Much of the investigation was televised and Block suggested to Kefauver he change the name of his broadcast to "What's My Crime?"

Block created what became a tradition of the show's opening. At the beginning of the show each panelist would introduce the panelist sitting beside them, except for the last, who would introduce Daly, the host. It was Block's idea, as the last panelist, to break from the simple, straightforward introduction and instead introduce Daly with a joke. This was later taken up by Bennett Cerf after Block's departure. It also fell to Block as the comedian, then later Steve Allen and Fred Allen, to participate in what executive producer Gil Fates called his "Gambits".

Prior to the broadcast, Fates would hint to Block a line of questioning for one of the guests that he felt would generate the most laughs. Fates has said it required a comedian to sense from his clues what would generate laughter. For example, with a guest who manufactured girdles, Block was advised to ask questions about kitchen items. On the show Block asked, "Will it make ice-cubes?" To a professional sword swallower he asked, "Do you work outdoors–or is yours considered an inside job?" While technically not cheating, as the panelist was not told the guest's profession, the practice was eventually discontinued in light of the quiz show scandals.

==== Fame ====
| Don't think I mind this being recognized, for I love it. For years nobody recognized me, not even the comedians I wrote for. —Hal Block on fame. (1951) |

By 1952, What's My Line? had become one of the highest-rated shows on television, and major publications praised Block's work. Irv Kupcinet of the Chicago Sun-Times called him the "freshest new personality in TV." Sid Shalit of the New York Daily News called Block "effervescent." Vogue magazine said, "People are laughing at Hal Block." The Chicago Tribune called Block "a golden boy on TV". The Philadelphia Inquirer called Block's humor "impish buffoonery."

Block had made the leap from the obscurity of working as writer to becoming a popular television figure in a short period of time.

As a writer Block had worked in anonymity. "For years nobody recognized me, not even the comedians I wrote for," he said. The show had made Block famous overnight and he admitted enjoying it, "Don't think I mind this being recognized, for I love it." Nonetheless, Bill Todman, the show's producer, said "Hal was never able to live with the idea of being a celebrity."

==== Popular, but problematic ====
During the first three years of What's My Line?, Block had gained popularity with a wide portion of the television viewing audience, but behind the scenes he was having problems with the sponsor and producer. According to publisher and fellow panelist Bennett Cerf, Block's personality and background set him apart from the other cast members. Cerf had joined the cast during the show's second year when Louis Untermeyer was dropped from the show because of accusations of being a communist.

Upon his first meeting with the panel members, Cerf thought of Block as "a clod. He wasn't in the same class as the others." Norman Barasch, who once wrote for Block, said "Suave, Hal Block wasn't." What's My Line? producer Gil Fates, in his 1978 book about the show, described Block as "a strange man", adding he was "stocky with curly black hair, heavy lips and, rather bulging eyes."

Block's humor at times could prove problematic as he sometimes seemed to lack a sense of propriety. He once risked the sponsor's wrath by referring to their deodorant with the line, "Make your armpit a charmpit." Cerf said that Block "had a style of humor none of us was too fond of." Block would also sometimes use risqué humor. He was not alone in this inclination, however, as other What's My Line? panelists often employed double entendres on the show. The issue occurred often enough that host John Daly had developed a surreptitious signal, the pulling of his right ear lobe, as a warning to panelists to desist. In these early days of television, many programs, including What's My Line?, were broadcast live and this type of humor became a concern of the sponsor. Although Block was not alone in such behavior, he became regarded as the chief offender.

Even prior to What's My Line?, Block's humor had always been inclined towards the sexual, as far back as a writer for Olsen and Johnson, whose bawdy shows usually involved at least one chorus girl losing her skirt. Once when addressing a group of businessmen and secretaries, Block told them, "Where would you men be without your secretaries? Probably home with your wives." This inclination continued onto the show. Once, when the guest was a female disk jockey, Block employed this line of questioning:

Do you take things off?"

Do people like it when you take things off?

The more things you take off, do people like it better?

After receiving a positive response to each, Block concluded:

You're obviously a strip-tease dancer.

Block was also in the habit of asking an attractive contestant for her phone number, or in one case, even chasing a female contestant around the desk à la Harpo Marx. Although Block intended these antics as humor, the more conservative segment of the What's My Line? audience regarded the behavior as inappropriate.

While Block continued to receive positive press and his jokes during the show were often quoted in newspaper columns, there was also criticism. Journalist William S. Schlamm wrote in the June 2, 1952, issue of The Freeman that Block, "on the flimsy ground of being a gag writer, for more than a year has kept claiming dispensation from elementary rules of taste." By 1953, producers had given Block repeated warnings about his behavior, which he was apparently ignoring.

==== Firing ====
In January 1953, Block was suspended for two weeks because the sponsor objected to one of his comments during the show. Steve Allen, at the time an up-and-coming comedian whose appearances on What's My Line? would springboard his career, took Block's place on the panel during the suspension. While Block vacationed in Miami for the duration of the suspension, the network was deluged with letters from his fans demanding his return.

Years later, in recollecting these days of What's My Line?, Bennett Cerf argued that by this time Block was no longer essential to the show. According to Cerf, since he had begun to introduce his own jokes and puns into the show, he now had the more important role and Block "became second banana." Amidst this turmoil, on February 5, 1953, winners for television's Emmy Awards were announced and What's My Line? won the Emmy for "Best Audience Participation, Quiz or Panel Program".

After the broadcast of the February 3, 1953 show, executive producer Gil Fates invited Block to a local bar for a drink. Block listened quietly for several minutes as Fates explained why his contract was not being renewed and was being let go after three more shows. According to Fates, when he finished talking, Block stood up, finished his drink, smashed the glass on the floor, said "You never did like me, you son-of-a-bitch", and walked out. Fates did not relate in his book why Block had been fired, but Bennett Cerf believed it was because he had chased a female contestant (possibly Rev. Leila Dell Miller, the first contestant on that evening's show) around the desk while the camera was on the next contestant. In an interview with the Paley Center for Media in 1987, however, show director Franklin Heller claimed that Block had cheated during the show with the help of his sister, who signaled to Block from the front row of the audience that the second contestant played the drums. This, Heller added, was also why Block never appeared on a game show again.

After three years on What's My Line?, Block appeared on three more shows, fully aware these were his last. Steve Allen also appeared on these shows, replacing Bennett Cerf who was away on a seven-week lecture tour. On Sunday, March 1, 1953, Block appeared on What's My Line? for the last time. The March 3, 1953 New York Times announced that Bennett Cerf was "displacing Hal Block" and that Steve Allen, who Fates later wrote "was standing in the wings", would be continuing on the panel.

Absent Block, What's My Line? continued on as a staple of Sunday night television in America for another 14 years.

While the firing of Block had the desired effect of toning down the sexual innuendoes, this aspect of the show would still draw occasional criticism. In 1957, four years after Block's departure from the show, Hearst columnist Bill Slocum wrote in his column accusing What's My Line? of "the carefully implanted double entendre." He went on to add, "Nobody on the panel leers since Hal Block left." In 1979, the book TV Gameshows proffered the opinion that Block was actually let go from What's My Line? because he "proved too overbearing."

== Final years in show business ==
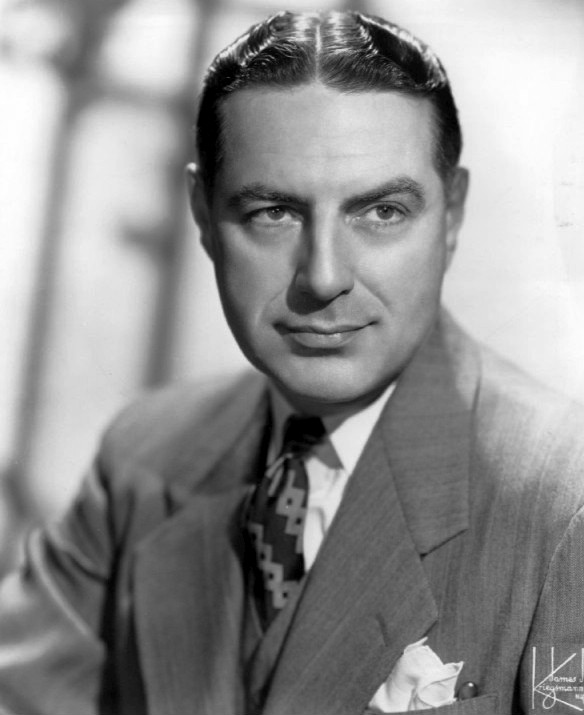
Block continued in working in show business after being fired from What's My Line?, working on Ted Mack's (pictured above) amateur talent television show

Block continued working in show business for a few more years. Immediately after being fired, he starred at Minsky's, a Detroit burlesque club. He was billed as "Dimples Block of 'What's My Line'?" Late in 1953, Block was hired as host of a television morning show directed towards women on WGN-TV in Chicago. He left the show after only two months due to an incident involving a group of paraplegics who had been invited to appear on the program. After traveling 20 miles, at great inconvenience, they were not used on the show. Block also "had difficulty with a doctor who accompanied them." In October 1953, Block was found guilty of speeding and driving without a license. In June of the same year, Block had been arrested in Chicago and charged with drunk driving. The drunk driving charge was dropped. In 1954, Block wrote and performed the satirical song "Senator McCarthy Blues". The song's theme was about a man who had lost his girlfriend to her obsession with watching the McCarthy hearings on television. In 1955, Block was working on Ted Mack's television show. In 1956, Block wrote the rock and roll song "Hot Rod Henry" for the B-side of Lola Dee's 45 rpm recording of "Born to Be with You".

In early 1957, a sneak preview in Florida of Second Honeymoon, a new television show Block was producing, had to be cancelled because there were no prizes. Block explained to a local newspaper that he had bought prizes in a pawnshop across from the station, WTVJ, but the shop was closed before he could retrieve them for the show. Block also complained how the incident was reported by the Miami News columnist, Jack W. Roberts, including that he had described Block as a "former What's My Line? panelist." Block said he was better known as a producer and comedy writer. Block continued to write, having a story published in the Saturday Evening Post, "Hal Block's Inventions". In February 1957, Block was found guilty of drunk driving in Miami Beach, Florida, and for not having a valid driver's license. At the trial the arresting officer said Block, who had been staggering, refused to take a Drunkometer test (the original breathalyzer), was belligerent and told the officer he would regret arresting him because he was "a big man".

By 1960 it was reported Block had moved into the investment business, but hoped to eventually return to television.

== Personal life ==
During his early writing days, Block was friends with fellow comedy writers Bill Morrow, a Jack Benny writer, and Don Quinn, who wrote for Fibber McGee and Molly.

During Block's years in radio and television, newspaper columns had linked him romantically to several actresses and singers including Nanette Fabray, Dorothea Pinto, and Joan Judson. Plans for marriage were reported between Block and Mitzi Green, and then later Kay Mallah, a showgirl. Green had been a childhood star and in 1941 was attempting to make a comeback at age twenty-one. Block, along with Herb Baker, was writing a Broadway show for her. When Block and Green split, he began seeing Dorothea Pinto, a chorus girl. Pinto once made some news while she was working at the Diamond Horseshoe nightclub in New York by punching one of the club's investors. Pinto appeared as a showgirl in Follow the Girls, which Block wrote. Block once explained he preferred being a bachelor because "wives were too expensive."

== Death ==
On April 22, 1981, Block was seriously burned from a fire in his Chicago apartment. Block died in Edgewater Hospital, Chicago, on June 16, 1981, as a result of his injuries. He was survived by two sisters.

== Legacy ==
An irrelevant never forgets.

— Hal Block joke (ca.1945)

Block remains a controversial figure in television history, denounced by some, while praised by others. Journalist Earl Wilson had once dubbed Block "a radio genius" and Bob Hope called Block "a great comedy writer." Then, in his book What's My Line? TV's Most Famous Panel Show, Gil Fates wrote, "You couldn't teach the meaning of good taste to Hal, any more than Star Kist could teach it to Charley the Tuna." Assessing Block's contribution to What's My Line?, Fates summed it up as "Hal had served his purpose when the program was young." By contrast, writer and journalist Bob Considine wrote in 1969 that Block "was to mean so much to the early success of television's What's My Line?" What's My Line? was on the air for 17 years and became the longest running game show in U.S. primetime history, while Block returned to anonymity.
