= Hollywood Premiere Theatre =

American TV anthology series (1950–1951)

- Genre: Anthology
- Written by: Bob Carroll, Jr. Madelyn Davis
- Starring: Gil Lamb (host); Don DeFore; Gale Storm
- Country of origin: United States
- Original language: English

Production
- Producers: Thomas Sarnoff; George Cahan
- Running time: 30 minutes

Original release
- Network: ABC
- Release: September 20, 1950 – October 5, 1951

Hollywood Premiere Theatre is the original title of an American television program that was broadcast more often as Hollywood Theatre Time on ABC from September 20, 1950 to October 5, 1951.

Content varied from week to week, including situation comedies, dramatic presentations, and scenes from well-known plays. Some early episodes were a variety program, The Gil Lamb Show.

The series was one of the first anthology shows aired from the West Coast, with viewers in the East seeing kinescopes of episodes. George M. Cahan and Thomas W. Sarnoff were the producers. Robert S. Finkel was the director.

The program's competition included The Victor Borge Show on NBC and The Sam Levinson Show on CBS.

Gale Storm co-starred with Don DeFore in "Mr. and Mrs. Detective" (alternately titled "Mystery and Mrs." on the show's September 27, 1950, episode. It was a pilot for a prospective series, but the series was not developed.

== Broadcast history ==
- September 20, 1950 - November 29, 1950 (Wednesdays 7:00-7:30pm ET) as Hollywood Premiere Theatre
- December 6, 1950 - June 6, 1951 (Wednesdays 7:00-7:30pm ET) as Hollywood Theatre Time
- June 15, 1951 - October 5, 1951 (Fridays 10:00-10:30pm ET) as Hollywood Theatre Time

== See also ==
- 1950-51 United States network television schedule
- 1951-52 United States network television schedule
