= Chez Paree Revue =

- Genre: Variety
- Starring: David E. Durston; Joyce Sellers; The Mello-Larks; Russ Reed (announcer)
- Composer: Cee Davidson
- Country of origin: United States
- Original language: English

Production
- Running time: 15 minutes

Original release
- Network: DuMont
- Release: 1950 – 1950

Chez Paree Revue is an American variety television series, which aired on the DuMont Television Network in 1950. Very little information exists as to the timeslot, running time, or dates aired.

== Format ==
The show was a musical variety series taking place on the set of a "Parisian" nightclub.

== Episode status ==
As with most DuMont series, no episodes are known to exist.

== See also ==
- List of programs broadcast by the DuMont Television Network
- List of surviving DuMont Television Network broadcasts
- 1950–51 United States network television schedule

== Bibliography ==
- David Weinstein, The Forgotten Network: DuMont and the Birth of American Television (Philadelphia: Temple University Press, 2004) ISBN 1-59213-245-6
- Alex McNeil, Total Television, Fourth edition (New York: Penguin Books, 1980) ISBN 0-14-024916-8
- Tim Brooks and Earle Marsh, The Complete Directory to Prime Time Network TV Shows, Third edition (New York: Ballantine Books, 1964) ISBN 0-345-31864-1
