= Frontier Theatre =

- Starring: Various
- Country of origin: United States

Production
- Running time: 60 minutes

Original release
- Network: DuMont
- Release: May 1950 – September 1950

Frontier Theatre is an early American weekly television film series, featuring Westerns, that aired on the DuMont Television Network. This summer series ran from May to September 1950. The program aired Saturday nights from 6:30 p.m. to 7:30 p.m. Eastern Time.

== Episode status ==
As with most DuMont network programs, no episodes are known to survive.

== See also ==
- List of programs broadcast by the DuMont Television Network
- List of surviving DuMont Television Network broadcasts

== Bibliography ==
- David Weinstein, The Forgotten Network: DuMont and the Birth of American Television (Philadelphia: Temple University Press, 2004) ISBN 1-59213-245-6
- Alex McNeil, Total Television, Fourth edition (New York: Penguin Books, 1980) ISBN 0-14-024916-8
- Tim Brooks and Earle Marsh, The Complete Directory to Prime Time Network TV Shows, Third edition (New York: Ballantine Books, 1964) ISBN 0-345-31864-1
