= Drene Time =

Don Ameche and Frances Langford as John and Blanche Bickerson.

Drene Time (aka The Drene Show) was a 30-minute radio variety show starring Don Ameche and singer-actress Frances Langford as co-hosts, airing on NBC's Sunday night schedule (10:00-10:30pm Eastern) in 1946–47.

The series was sponsored by Procter & Gamble's Drene Shampoo, and the announcer was Tobe Reed. When the series first began on September 8, 1946, Ameche was its lead. Then on December 15, 1946 the show was overhauled, with Philip Rapp brought in as its writer, and with actors Frances Langford and Danny Thomas added to the main cast. Music was provided by Carmen Dragon and His Orchestra, with production by Carlton Alsop. The December 15th show started with Don explaining the new variety format to Carmen and Frances, after which she sang "Sooner or Later", which was later adapted for the film Dick Tracy (1990). Drene Time would now usually open with Langford singing a big band-style arrangement. Then Ameche and Langford would slip into comedy, often aided by co-star Danny Thomas, in routines involving Thomas' frustration that Ameche was less of an actor than Thomas.

After another musical number and a commercial spot for Drene Shampoo, Ameche and Langford appeared as the Bickersons for the final 15 minutes of the show. The Bickersons segment, at that time, was titled, "The Honeymoon Is Over." Also in the cast was Gale Gordon.

An early audition show of July 31, 1946 featured a different cast: Don Ameche, guest Sylvia Sidney, announcer Truman Bradley, Joseph Lilley and His Orchestra, Pinky Lee, Jim Backus, the Swing Choir, Jonelle James, Earle Ross and announcer Marvin Miller.

The series was adapted for television in 1950 as Star Time.
