= Stairway to Stardom (TV series) =

US music television program (1950–1951)

Stairway to Stardom is an early American music television program which aired 1950 to 1951 on New Jersey station WATV. It was among the first with an African-American host, though it was not a network program. Bill Cook, a radio disc jockey, was the host. According to an article titled "Bill Cook Sparks New Video Show" in a 1950 edition of newspaper The Pittsburgh Courier, Bill Cook had stated that talent on the program would be "selected on the basis of ability and without regard to race, color or religion". The show is believed lost.

Other early American television shows with African-American hosts included two DuMont Television Network programs, Elder Michaux (1948–1949, then continued as local program afterwards) and The Hazel Scott Show (1950), the CBS program Uptown Jubilee (1949), and the WABD local program titled Amanda (1948–1949).

Cook was also host of a radio program called Musical Caravan.
