= Country Style (American TV series) =

American TV variety series (1950)

- Starring: Peggy Ann Ellis (host)
- Country of origin: United States

Production
- Executive producers: Owen Bradley; Harold Bradley
- Running time: 60 minutes

Original release
- Network: DuMont
- Release: July 29 – November 25, 1950

Country Style is an American musical variety show on the DuMont Television Network from July 29, 1950, to November 25, 1950, on Saturday nights from 8–9 p.m. Eastern Time.

The setting was a small town bandstand on a Saturday night. Musical numbers, comedy vignettes and square dancing took place around the bandstand, where Alvy West and the Volunteer Firemen's Band played. The host was Peggy Ann Ellis. Regulars included Ray Smith, Pat Adair, Bob Austin, Emily Barnes, Gordon Dilworth, and The Folk Dancers.

As with most DuMont series, no episodes are known to survive. This series should not be confused with the radio and TV series Country Style, USA (1957–60).

== Critical response ==
Jack Gould, in a review in The New York Times, wrote that, although some elements of the premiere episode were appealing, "the whole looked as if it had been put together by a summer apprentice group which had seen only the work of Oklahoma and Carousel." He said that Dilworth "did very handily by some folk songs on the guitar" and that Ellis "was satisfactory" but she could have chosen better songs.

== Jimmy Dean program ==
During 1957, Jimmy Dean hosted Country Style, a daytime TV version of The Jimmy Dean Show, which aired on WTOP-TV in Washington, DC, on weekday mornings.

== See also ==
- List of programs broadcast by the DuMont Television Network
- List of surviving DuMont Television Network broadcasts
- 1950-51 United States network television schedule

== Bibliography ==
- David Weinstein, The Forgotten Network: DuMont and the Birth of American Television (Philadelphia: Temple University Press, 2004) ISBN 1-59213-245-6
