= Tag the Gag =

1951 short-lived television series

Tag the Gag is an American television series which aired in August 1951 on NBC. It was a panel game show. The programme proved unsuccessful with viewers and critics. It was hosted by Hal Block, a regular panelist on What's My Line?. Also featured were Morey Amsterdam, Harvey Stone, Herkle Stiles, and Jean Carroll. The archival status of the series is not known, and it is possible (though not confirmed) that it was wiped.

== Reception ==
Bob Lanigan for the Brooklyn Eagle called the series "a 1946 TV version of the 1940 Can You Top This? radio show" and complained of the "weak gags based on old and very tired jokes".
