= Your Story Theatre =

American TV dramatic anthology series (1950–1951)

- Also known as: Story Theater; Durkee Story Theater
- Genre: Anthology
- Country of origin: United States
- Original language: English
- No. of seasons: 1
- No. of episodes: 27

Production
- Executive producer: Hal Roach
- Camera setup: Single-camera
- Running time: 25 mins.

Original release
- Network: DuMont (Nov 1950-May 1951); NBC (June-Sept 1951)
- Release: November 4, 1950 – September 17, 1951

Your Story Theatre (also known as Story Theater and Durkee Story Theater) is an American dramatic anthology television series that aired on the DuMont Television Network and on NBC. The DuMont series aired from November 4, 1950, to May 11, 1951, and the NBC series aired from June 24 to September 17, 1951.

== Production ==
The DuMont version was broadcast from 8 to 8:30 p.m. Eastern Time on Fridays. The series was filmed at Hal Roach Studios and sponsored by Durkee Foods.

== Cast ==
Actors appearing in the series included:

- Julie Adams
- Robert Alda
- John Beal
- Jan Clayton
- Leif Erickson
- William Frawley
- Eva Gabor
- Hugo Haas
- Hurd Hatfield
- Sterling Holloway
- Marjorie Lord
- Dan O'Herlihy
- Gene Reynolds

== Authors ==
Authors whose works were adapted for the program included Henry James, Robert Louis Stevenson, and Frank R. Stockton.

== Episode status ==
As with most DuMont series, no episodes are known to survive.

The March 23, 1951, episode was Oscar Wilde's "Birthday of the Infants".

== Bibliography ==
- David Weinstein, The Forgotten Network: DuMont and the Birth of American Television (Philadelphia: Temple University Press, 2004) ISBN 1-59213-245-6

== See also ==
- List of programs broadcast by the DuMont Television Network
- List of surviving DuMont Television Network broadcasts
- 1950-51 United States network television schedule
