= Star Time (TV series) =

American TV variety series (1950–1951)

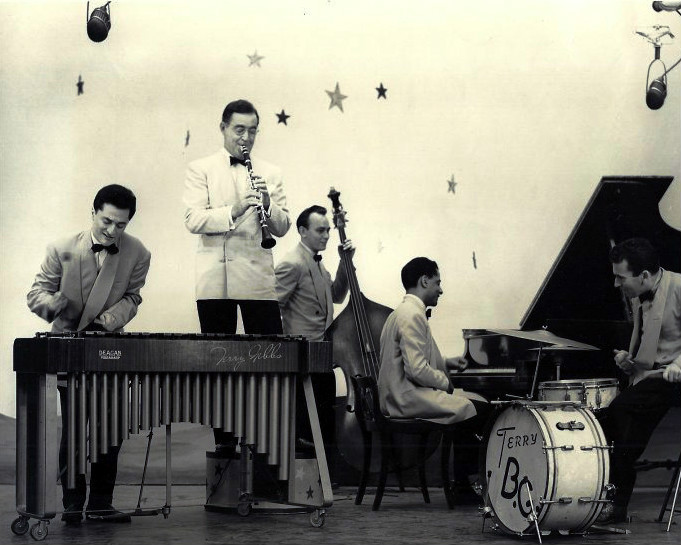
- Benny Goodman and his band on the show
- Country of origin: United States

Original release
- Network: DuMont
- Release: September 2, 1950 – February 24, 1951

Star Time is an American variety series that aired on the DuMont Television Network from September 5, 1950, to February 27, 1951, and starred singer-actress Frances Langford. It was broadcast from 10 to 11 p.m. on Tuesdays.

== Broadcast history ==
The hour-long comedy-variety show spotlighted several regulars and guest performers. One feature of each telecast was a lengthy skit, written and directed by Philip Rapp, with Langford and Lew Parker performing as The Bickersons, a quarrelsome married couple that migrated from radio as a distinctively-unhappy sitcom man and wife.

With Langford as a singer, music was an integral component of the series's early episodes. The premier telecast spotlighted The Harmonicats, a trio of versatile harmonica players who had achieved great prominence in the 1940s. But the program soon settled on a regular slot called Club Goodman featuring the Benny Goodman Sextet—with Goodman and Teddy Wilson among others.

With Wilson's weekly appearances, Star Time became one of the first sponsored national TV series to offer an African-American performer as a cast regular.

Star Time was an adaptation of the earlier radio series Drene Time, which had aired from 1946 to 1947.

In November 1950 Charlie Cantor, John Conte, and Reginald Gardiner joined the cast of Star Time while Goodman, the four-singer chorus, and three dancers. were dropped. The change gave the program more emphasis on comedy and less on music. Others who were featured on the show included Ted Steele and Buddy Rogers.

The premiere episode featured Phil Regan and Ben Blue as guest stars. Dick Haymes was the guest star on the second episode, and David Burns had that role on the third. The veteran vaudeville comedy team of Al Shaw and Sam Lee furnished comedy bits between specialties.

== Episode status ==
The UCLA Film and Television Archive has four complete episodes, along with excerpts from a fifth episode.

The J. Fred and Leslie W. MacDonald Collection of the Library of Congress contains five half-hour segments of Star Time, including the first half-hour of the premiere telecast which featured The Harmonicats; plus an opening half-hour of another show; and three closing half-hour segments highlighting the Benny Goodman Sextet as well as The Bickersons skits.

== Production ==
Star Time originated from the Ambassador Playhouse via WABD, with Food Stores Corporation as its sponsor. DuMont had recently bought the theater and renovated it for use in TV productions. George Forrest and Robert Wright produced and directed the show. Writers included Phil Rapp.

== Critical response ==
A review of the premiere episode in The New York Times said, "Star Time has a little of everything, but not too much of it enjoyed any particular style or freshness." Critic Jack Gould commented that original songs on the show "were on the trite side both lyrically and melodically" He complimented Langford's performance and noted that Goodman and Parker should have had more to do on the show. The review concluded by saying, "Mark down Star Time as a show with promise which remains to be realized."

Joe Czida's review in the trade publication Billboard began by saying that The Bickersons segment should be a program of its own, noting that it is "so far superior to the rest of the package," citing Rapp's writing as being "basically responsible for the bit's wow qualities." The review said that the rest of the show "is a good, average variety hour", less lavish than those on CBS and NBC because of DuMont's more economical budgeting. Czida complimented the production as a whole and praised the singing of Langford and the dancing of Lee.

== See also ==
- List of programs broadcast by the DuMont Television Network
- List of surviving DuMont Television Network broadcasts
- 1950–51 United States network television schedule

== Bibliography ==
- David Weinstein, The Forgotten Network: DuMont and the Birth of American Television (Philadelphia: Temple University Press, 2004) ISBN 1-59213-245-6
- Tim Brooks and Earle Marsh, The Complete Directory to Prime Time Network TV Shows, Third edition (New York: Ballantine Books, 1964) ISBN 0-345-31864-1
