= Rhythm Rodeo =

- Starring: Art Jarrett (host)
- Country of origin: United States

Production
- Running time: 30 minutes

Original release
- Network: DuMont
- Release: August 6, 1950 – January 7, 1951

Rhythm Rodeo is an American television series which aired on the DuMont Television Network from August 6, 1950, to January 7, 1951. Each 30-minute episode was broadcast live. Despite its name, it featured many different types of popular music, although the original premise of the show was to showcase country and western music.

The series starred noted singer Art Jarrett, and also featured Paula Wray and the Star Noters. The writer was Loring Mandel. The series aired on Sunday nights at 8 pm EST opposite the popular The Toast of the Town (The Ed Sullivan Show) on CBS and The Colgate Comedy Hour on NBC, and was cancelled after the January 7 broadcast.

== Episode status ==
As with most DuMont series, no episodes of this show are known to survive today.

== See also ==
- List of programs broadcast by the DuMont Television Network
- List of surviving DuMont Television Network broadcasts
- 1950–51 United States network television schedule

== Bibliography ==
- David Weinstein, The Forgotten Network: DuMont and the Birth of American Television (Philadelphia: Temple University Press, 2004) ISBN 1-59213-245-6
- Alex McNeil, Total Television, Fourth edition (New York: Penguin Books, 1980) ISBN 0-14-024916-8
- Tim Brooks and Earle Marsh, The Complete Directory to Prime Time Network and Cable TV Shows 1946–Present, Ninth edition (New York: Ballantine Books, 2007) ISBN 978-0-345-49773-4
