= Saturday Roundup =

- Genre: Western
- Starring: Kermit Maynard
- Country of origin: United States
- Original language: English

Production
- Running time: 60 minutes

Original release
- Network: NBC
- Release: June 10 – September 1, 1951

Saturday Roundup is an American Western television program that aired on NBC on Saturday nights from June 10, 1951, to September 1, 1951, at 8:00 p.m Eastern Standard Time.

== Synopsis ==
The stories on Saturday Roundup were all adaptations of stories by James Oliver Curwood, and each of them starred Kermit Maynard in a different role each week.

== Bibliography ==
- Tim Brooks and Earle Marsh, The Complete Directory to Prime Time Network and Cable TV Shows 1946–Present, Ninth edition (New York: Ballantine Books, 2007) ISBN 978-0-345-49773-4
