= Newsweek Views the News =

American public affairs TV series (1948–1950)

- Also known as: Newsweek Analysis
- Genre: Public affairs program Talk show
- Written by: Howard Merrill
- Directed by: Barry Shear
- Presented by: Ernest K. Lindley
- Country of origin: United States
- Original language: English

Production
- Camera setup: Multi-camera
- Running time: 25 mins

Original release
- Network: DuMont
- Release: November 7, 1948 – May 22, 1950

Newsweek Views the News (originally known as Newsweek Analysis) is an American public affairs television program broadcast Mondays at 8pm ET on the DuMont Television Network. The series ran from November 7, 1948, to May 22, 1950.

== Overview ==
The series is a public affairs program hosted by Ernest K. Lindley. Editors of Newsweek magazine interviewed guests and discussed current news events.

The program, produced and distributed by DuMont, aired live on Monday nights from 8–8:30 p.m. on most DuMont affiliates. The last episode was aired on May 22, 1950, and DuMont replaced the series with Visit with the Armed Forces.

== Episode status ==
Kinescopes of two episodes, "Casebook of Treason" (February 27, 1950) and "The Far East" (April 17, 1950), are in the collection of the UCLA Film and Television Archive.

"Casebook on Treason" featured ex-Soviet spies Whittaker Chambers and Hede Massing and Soviet defector Peter Pirogov as speakers.

== See also ==
- List of programs broadcast by the DuMont Television Network
- List of surviving DuMont Television Network broadcasts
- 1949-50 United States network television schedule

== Bibliography ==
- David Weinstein, The Forgotten Network: DuMont and the Birth of American Television (Philadelphia: Temple University Press, 2004) ISBN 1-59213-245-6
- Tim Brooks and Earle Marsh, The Complete Directory to Prime Time Network TV Shows, Third edition (New York: Ballantine Books, 1964) ISBN 0-345-31864-1
