= The Susan Raye Show =

- Presented by: Susan Raye
- Country of origin: United States

Production
- Running time: 15 minutes

Original release
- Network: DuMont
- Release: October 2 – November 20, 1950

The Susan Raye Show is an early American television program broadcast on the now defunct DuMont Television Network.

== Broadcast history ==
The series ran from October to November of 1950. It was a musical program hosted by singer and pianist Susan Raye. The program, produced and distributed by DuMont, aired Mondays and Fridays at 7:45 PM on most DuMont affiliates, alternating with The Joan Edwards Show which was in the same time slot on Tuesdays and Thursdays.

The Susan Raye Show replaced The Hazel Scott Show, a very similar program which had starred pianist and singer Hazel Scott. Scott had been implicated in Red Channels as a supposed Communist sympathizer. Although Scott denied the charges, she was effectively blacklisted, and her series was cancelled. The Susan Raye Show filled the DuMont network's programming gap for two months. The series was cancelled after the November 20 broadcast.

== Episode status ==
As with most DuMont series, no episodes are known to exist.

== See also ==
- List of programs broadcast by the DuMont Television Network
- List of surviving DuMont Television Network broadcasts
- 1950-51 United States network television schedule

== Bibliography ==
- David Weinstein, The Forgotten Network: DuMont and the Birth of American Television (Philadelphia: Temple University Press, 2004) ISBN 1-59213-245-6
- Alex McNeil, Total Television, Fourth edition (New York: Penguin Books, 1980) ISBN 0-14-024916-8
- Tim Brooks and Earle Marsh, The Complete Directory to Prime Time Network and Cable TV Shows 1946–Present, Ninth edition (New York: Ballantine Books, 2007) ISBN 978-0-345-49773-4
