= Starlit Time =

American variety TV series (1950)

- Genre: Music
- Starring: Cy Coleman; Gordon Dilworth
- Country of origin: United States
- Original language: English

Original release
- Network: DuMont
- Release: April 9 – November 19, 1950

Starlit Time is a variety series that was broadcast on the DuMont Television Network. The series aired from April 9 to November 19, 1950. It was also known as The S. S. Holiday.

This show aired Sundays at 7 pm ET and replaced Front Row Center.

== Format and personnel ==
Initially Starlit Time consisted of two distinct hours of programming with Minnie Jo Curtis linking the two segments in the role of a switchboard operator. Bill Williams was the master of ceremonies for the first hour, titled "Welcome Mat", which included Gordon Dilworth and the Sylvia Meredith puppets, dancers Sandra Lee and Sam Steen, and comedienne Bibi Osterwald, with Reggie Beane providing music. The second hour, "Phil Hanna Sings", starred Hanna. Other performers in that segment were singer Holly Harris, the dance team Roberto and Alicia, and comedienne Elaine Stritch. The Cy Coleman trio provided music.

By the end of April 1950, the program had been cut to one hour, broadcast from 7 to 8 p.m. Eastern Time with Williams and Hanna as co-hosts.

Bela Lugosi made a rare TV guest appearance on May 21. Other guest stars who appeared on the program included Mildred Bailey.

Bob Loewi was the producer, and Pat Fay was the director. Fred Scott was the announcer.

== Critical response ==
A review of the April 9, 1950, episode in the trade publication Billboard said of the two-segment episode, "their coupling remains somewhat of a mystery." The second hour received more praise than the first, and the review complimented camera work and production.

Another review (of the August 13, 1950, episode) in Billboard said that the program "has some excellent, even if not socko, moments of entertainment." The review commended the music of Beane's trio but said that the comedy "was decidedly negative, however, and could be dispensed with."

== Episode status ==
As with most DuMont series, no episodes are known to exist.

== See also ==
- List of programs broadcast by the DuMont Television Network
- List of surviving DuMont Television Network broadcasts
- 1950–51 United States network television schedule

== Bibliography ==
- David Weinstein, The Forgotten Network: DuMont and the Birth of American Television (Philadelphia: Temple University Press, 2004) ISBN 1-59213-245-6
