= Short Story Playhouse =

- Genre: anthology
- Presented by: Robert Breen
- Country of origin: United States
- Original language: English

Original release
- Network: NBC
- Release: July 5 – August 23, 1951

Short Story Playhouse is an American anthology television series that aired live Chicago on NBC as the summer replacement for The Wayne King Show.

Among the presentations were Sinclair Lewis' "The Good Sport", James Thurber's "My Life and Hard Times", and Pearl Buck's "Ransom".
