= The Bickersons =

Radio and television comedy sketch series (1946–1951)

Don Ameche and Frances Langford as John and Blanche Bickerson.

The Bickersons is a series of radio and television comedy sketches that first aired in 1946 on NBC radio. The show's married protagonists, portrayed by Don Ameche (later by Lew Parker) and Frances Langford, spent nearly all their time together in a relentless verbal war.

== Radio origins ==
The Bickersons was created by Philip Rapp, the one-time Eddie Cantor writer who had also created the Fanny Brice skits (for The Ziegfeld Follies of the Air and Maxwell House Coffee Time) that grew into radio's Baby Snooks. Several years after the latter established itself as a long-running favorite, Rapp developed and presented John and Blanche Bickerson, first as a 15-minute situational sketch as part of the 1946 half-hour radio program Drene Time, then as a short sketch on The Old Gold Show and later, on The Chase and Sanborn Hour (the show that made stars of Edgar Bergen and his dummy, Charlie McCarthy). Drene Time was a variety show starring Don Ameche and singer-actress Frances Langford as co-hosts, airing on NBC and sponsored by Drene Shampoo. Announcing the show—and later familiar to television viewers as The Millionaire's presenter and executive secretary, Michael Anthony—was Marvin Miller.

Drene Time typically opened with Langford singing a big band-style arrangement before Ameche and Langford would slip into routine comedy, often aided by co-star Danny Thomas, in routines that often expressed Ameche's frustration that Thomas was more interested in modern technology and discoveries than in women. After another musical number and a commercial spot for Drene Shampoo, Miller would announce Ameche and Langford as the Bickersons, "in 'The Honeymoon's Over'", for the final 15 minutes of the show.

A stand-alone The Bickersons half-hour radio series then ran on CBS radio for a short time in summer 1951. In that version, Lew Parker (later familiar as That Girl's harried, slightly overbearing father Lew Marie) took the role of John Bickerson, as he had done on television a season earlier (see below). Premiering as a summer season replacement, the CBS radio version of The Bickersons lasted only 13 episodes.

== Structure ==
The typical Miller introduction would set the scene:

The Bickersons... have retired. Three o'clock in the morning finds Mrs. Bickerson wide awake and anxious, as poor husband John, victim of contagious insomnia, or Schmoe's Disease, broadcasts the telltale signs of the dreaded affliction. Listen...

The listener heard a chorus of low-roaring snoring, punctuated occasionally with something that sounded like laughing mixed with crying. Blanche would awaken John, even at three in the morning, and the feuding would continue with their trademark arguments about John's jobs, Blanche's domestic abilities, Blanche's continual wasteful spending of his money; John's alleged eye for neighbor Gloria Gooseby, Blanche's shiftless brother Amos (played by Thomas, whose real given name was Amos), her other family members (notably her sister, Clara) or John's taste for bourbon.

Sometimes, they would go off on random rants about various scenarios. Blanche usually moaning about not having children, and, after unloading on him about how miserable life would be for a child in that house, would accuse John of not feeding their non-existent baby (after calling him an unsympathetic unfeeling wretch), or John ranting about Blanche marrying someone else (usually their tightwad physician, Dr. Hersey) and him living off of his money, usually after John was taunted into making out a will.

During their spats, Blanche would often try to force John to do something that normally wouldn't be done at such an early morning hour, such as the aforementioned will; going to Dr. Hersey's office to cure his snoring; or getting re-married. She usually taunted him into these actions, by saying, "You'll say it, but you won't do it. Do it now!"

In fairness, John once turned the tables on Blanche by trying to provoke her (using the "you'll say it, but you won't do it!" spiel) into buying him a race-horse after she took his money and squandered it on a bookie.

Rounding out the cast was future children's television favorite Pinky Lee in occasional supporting roles.

As New York Herald Tribune critic John Crosby described them (in his May 1948 column which gave the couple their nickname, "The Bickering Bickersons"):

Blanche... is one of the monstrous shrews of all time. She makes her husband... take two jobs, a total of 16 working hours, in order to bring in more money which she squanders on minks and the stock market. Meanwhile, he can't afford a new pair of shoes and goes around with his feet painted black. In the few hours he has to sleep, she heckles him all night with the accusation that he doesn't love her. Her aim appears to be to drive her husband crazy and she succeeds very nicely. The harassed John's only weapon is insult, at which he's pretty good.

== Dialogue ==
As transcribed by John Crosby in his May 1948 column, this was a typical Bickersons exchange:

B: You used to be so considerate. Since you got married to me you haven't got any sympathy at all.
J: I have, too. I've got everybody's sympathy.
B: Believe me, there's better fish in the ocean than the one I caught.
J: There's better bait, too.
B: I don't see how you can go to bed without kissing me good night.
J: I can do it.
B: You'd better say you're sorry for that, John.
J: Okay, I'm sorry, I'm sorry, I'm sorry.
B: You are not.
J: I am too. I'm the sorriest man that was ever born.

and...
B: Is there any milk for breakfast?
J: No.
B: Then you'll have to eat out.
J: I don't care, I've been doing it all week.
B: What for? I left you enough food for six days. I cooked a whole bathtubful of rice. What happened to it?
J: I took a bath in it.
B: Why didn't you eat it?
J: I've told you a million times I can't stand the sight of rice.
B: Why not?
J: Because it's connected to the saddest mistake of my life.

== The flip side ==
Though they spent their allotted time together at each other's throats, assuming always that the shrewish Blanche could awaken John from his snoring, there were moments when the couple showed an uncommon tenderness to each other—particularly in a Christmas skit. (It should have been hinted at the outset by Marvin Miller's atypical introduction: "The Bickersons—have not retired.") After arguing over whether John had sent Blanche a Christmas card (he had, it was buried in a stack of newspapers), they exchanged their gifts to each other... with a twist. Tight in the pocketbook, Blanche had swapped a fur coat to buy her bourbon-loving husband a portable bar; John—although a bourbon lover—had swapped his stock to buy Blanche a matching fur muffler. But the skit ends with the confession that, for all that they're each other's biggest pain in the rump, there really is a love between them.

Jackie Gleason probably knew of that Christmas exchange or had also read the short story it was based on, O. Henry's "The Gift of the Magi." A "classic 39" Christmas episode of The Honeymooners involved blustery bus driver Ralph hocking his brand-new bowling ball in a mad dash to get Alice a last-minute Christmas gift, only to learn the hard way that Alice had bought him a stylish new bowling ball bag.

== Television ==
The Bickersons had at least two television runs. The first was as a segment on Star Time, which ran on Dumont for a half-season, from September 1950 to February 1951. In this version, Lew Parker took the role of John Bickerson, as he would also do on radio a season later. The televised version did not work as well as the original skits. Langford did not appear to have the seamless anti-chemistry with Parker as she did with Ameche, and the show's persistent setting (always in the same bedroom) made the show less than ideal for the visual medium.

Ameche and Langford later co-hosted a daytime variety series, The Frances Langford–Don Ameche Show, in 1951–1952, which featured among the few regular performers a very young Jack Lemmon, as a newlywed in a sketch series known as "The Couple Next Door". When Langford hosted a variety special in 1960, Ameche appeared along with The Three Stooges (Moe Howard, Larry Fine, and Joe DeRita at the time), Bob Cummings and Johnny Mathis.

== Recordings ==
Columbia Records eventually released long-playing albums—The Bickersons, The Bickersons Fight Back, and The Bickersons Rematch—that featured newly recorded performances of Rapp's adapted radio scripts by Ameche and Langford as John and Blanche. Rematch was the two LPs reissued in a gatefold jacket as a two record set.

Frances Langford enjoyed a career as a singer and actress in film (including a cameo in The Glenn Miller Story) and television, as well as radio; she died July 11, 2005. Don Ameche continued to work in film and television, enjoying a late-life revival through his roles in the 1983 film Trading Places and the 1985 film Cocoon. He died in 1993.

== Adaptations and cultural references ==
In the movie MASH, when Radar O'Reilly bugs Margaret Houlihan's tent as she and Frank Burns have a sexual encounter, Father Mulcahy (who has walked into the room while the others are listening) is told that the conversation (and noises) being listened to are a radio program. He asks if it is an episode of The Bickersons...until he realizes otherwise, and hastily leaves.

In the Season 1 finale of NewsRadio, Dave and Lisa are called "the magnificent Bickersons" by Bill (at once a reference to the radio show and a play on the title of Orson Welles' 1942 film The Magnificent Ambersons). Ameche and Welles shared the same hometown of Kenosha, Wisconsin, and at 8:00 p.m. Eastern Time on the night of October 30, 1938, Welles made his legendary "War of the Worlds" radio broadcast on the CBS network while Ameche hosted The Chase and Sanborn Hour on the Red Network of NBC.

The Bickersons can be heard in the video game L.A. Noire, playing on the radio during driving sequences.

The Bickersons inspired The Honeymooners and other television shows about couples.

In The Proposal, the lead character Margaret Tate describes her quarrelsome dynamic with her pretend fiancée Andrew Paxton as that of “the Bickering Bickersons”.
