= Adventure Playhouse =

- Country of origin: United States

Production
- Running time: 1 hour

Original release
- Network: DuMont
- Release: April 1950 – May 1950

Adventure Playhouse is the umbrella title of an early American television program broadcast on the now defunct DuMont Television Network. The series ran from April to May of 1950.

The one-hour-long program, produced and distributed by DuMont, aired pre-1948 films on Wednesday nights from 8-9 pm ET on most DuMont affiliates. The series was not renewed after the initial short run.

The May 29, 1950, episode was "Battle Scene".

== See also ==
- List of programs broadcast by the DuMont Television Network
- List of surviving DuMont Television Network broadcasts

== Bibliography ==
- David Weinstein, The Forgotten Network: DuMont and the Birth of American Television (Philadelphia: Temple University Press, 2004) ISBN 1-59213-245-6
- Alex McNeil, Total Television, Fourth edition (New York: Penguin Books, 1980) ISBN 0-14-024916-8
- Tim Brooks and Earle Marsh, The Complete Directory to Prime Time Network and Cable TV Shows 1946–Present, Ninth edition (New York: Ballantine Books, 2007) ISBN 978-0-345-49773-4
