= Sure as Fate =

American TV mystery anthology series (1950–1951)

Sure as Fate is a 60-minute American anthology mystery drama series that aired on CBS from July 4, 1950, until April 3, 1951.

Episodes of Sure as Fate focus on people who were caught up in "situations not of their own making". Critical reactions to a two-week trial in July 1950 were good enough that the program was brought back as a regular series in September 1950.

== Personnel and production ==
Sure as Fate was narrated by Paul Lukas. Its guest stars included Kim Stanley, John Carradine, Leslie Nielsen, and Marsha Hunt.

Montgomery Ford and Jerry Danzig were the producers. Among its directors were John Pyser, Yul Brynner and Hal Gerson. The series originated at WCBS-TV in New York City. The program was sustaining and was produced live.

When the show returned in September 1950 it was broadcast weekly for one month, after which it began alternating with Prudential Family Playhouse. It was shown on Tuesdays from 8 to 9 p.m. Eastern Time, when its competition included Texaco Star Theater.

== Episodes ==
Partial List of Episodes of Sure as Fate
Date	Title	Actor(s)
July 4, 1950	"Tremolo"	Bobby Nick
October 31, 1950	"Three Blind Mice"	NA
November 14, 1950	"Ten Days to Spring"	Elspeth Eric, Ted Newton.
January 9, 1951	"Macbeth"	Judith Evelyn, John Carradine
April 3, 1951	"Guinea Pigs"	Marsha Hunt, Dane Clark

=== Raising funds for charity ===
The April 3, 1951, episode dealt with a doctor's cancer-related experiments on convicts who volunteered to serve as subjects. "Guinea Pigs" (which was written by a practicing physician) depicted ways of fighting cancer, leading Merrill Panitt, critic for The Philadelphia Inquirer, to write, "the audience learned quite a bit about the disease" without sensationalism.

The broadcast included an intermission during which Douglas Fairbanks Jr. and Mrs. Alben W. Barkley asked the audience to contribute to the American Cancer Society. Panitt commended that approach to raising funds and suggested that other dramatic programs might use a similar technique to help campaigns for charitable causes. He contrasted that approach with fundraising marathons, during which "the point of the charity, the need for it, takes second place to the stars".

== Critical response ==
Jack Gould's review in The New York Times of Sure as Fate's production of Macbeth called the modern-dress interpretation of that play "a commendable demonstration of television's willingness to experiment." Gould added that the episode "was bold in concept and an arresting item of controversial theatre." He felt, however, that the modernization did not go far enough, such as when Lady Macbeth wore a modern hostess's gown while wearing an ornate crown as she presided at an "Elizabethan banquet table"; Gould said, "the inconsistency was very disconcerting".

A review in the trade publication Billboard said that Sure as Fate "is making a good try for audience, and what comes up on the screen makes interesting viewing." It had mixed comments about the episode "The Rabbit", saying that "it shaped up as good drama for the most part, with moments of fine characterization and suspense" but also pointing out flaws in the script that contrasted with other excellent script segments. Overall, the review said that the show's producer, director, and writers "are working hard and honestly to develop good video drama."

Media critic John Crosby praised Sure as Fate in a syndicated column that contained critiques of three suspense-themed dramatic programs that CBS broadcast on Tuesday nights. He described Sure as Fate as "meticulously cast and carefully underwritten." Crosby wrote that each character in an episode, regardless of the size of the role, was portrayed in a way that made "a solid impact" and helped to move the plot along. He also noted that creation of atmosphere was not overdone.
