= The Most Important People =

- Also known as: Mr. and Mrs. Carroll
- Presented by: Jimmy Carroll; Rita Carroll
- Country of origin: United States

Production
- Running time: 15 minutes

Original release
- Network: DuMont
- Release: October 18, 1950 – April 13, 1951

The Most Important People (also known as Mr. and Mrs. Carroll) is a 15-minute musical variety show on the DuMont Television Network, hosted by orchestra leader Jimmy Carroll (1913–1972) and his wife Rita Carroll. The show aired Wednesdays and Fridays at 7:30pm EST from October 18, 1950, to April 13, 1951. The title referred to babies, since the sponsor was Gerber's Baby Food.

== Episode status ==
As with most DuMont series, no episodes are known to exist.

== See also ==
- List of programs broadcast by the DuMont Television Network
- List of surviving DuMont Television Network broadcasts
- 1950-51 United States network television schedule
- List of local children's television series

== Bibliography ==
- David Weinstein, The Forgotten Network: DuMont and the Birth of American Television (Philadelphia: Temple University Press, 2004) ISBN 1-59213-245-6
- Alex McNeil, Total Television, Fourth edition (New York: Penguin Books, 1980) ISBN 0-14-024916-8
