= The Joan Edwards Show =

- Presented by: Joan Edwards
- Country of origin: United States

Production
- Running time: 15 mins.

Original release
- Network: DuMont
- Release: July 4 – October 24, 1950

The Joan Edwards Show is an American television variety show broadcast on the DuMont Television Network July 4, 1950 – October 24, 1950.

== Broadcast history ==
Hosted by singer Joan Edwards, the show aired Tuesdays and Thursdays from 7:45 to 8 p.m. Eastern Time, alternating with The Hazel Scott Show which premiered on July 3, 1950 and was in the same time slot on Mondays, Wednesdays, and Fridays. (Beginning on October 2, 1950, The Susan Raye Show was a replacement for The Hazel Scott Show, after Scott was accused of being a Communist in the newsletter Red Channels.)

== Episode status ==
As with most DuMont series, no episodes are known to exist.

== Production ==
Martin Goodman produced the series, and Dick Sandwick was the director.

== See also ==
- List of programs broadcast by the DuMont Television Network
- List of surviving DuMont Television Network broadcasts
- 1950-51 United States network television schedule

== Bibliography ==
- David Weinstein, The Forgotten Network: DuMont and the Birth of American Television (Philadelphia: Temple University Press, 2004) ISBN 1-59213-245-6
- Alex McNeil, Total Television, Fourth edition (New York: Penguin Books, 1980) ISBN 0-14-024916-8
- Tim Brooks and Earle Marsh, The Complete Directory to Prime Time Network and Cable TV Shows 1946–Present, Ninth edition (New York: Ballantine Books, 2007) ISBN 978-0-345-49773-4
