= Television Theatre =

Television Theatre is a one-hour American television anthology drama series. Six episodes aired on CBS Fridays from March 25, 1950 to June 2, 1950, alternating weeks with Actors Studio.

The November 19, 1950, episode was Foreign Correspondent, with Joel McCrea, Laraine Day, Herbert Marshall, and George Sanders. Other episodes included Dear Brutus, The Little Minister, School for Scandal, Father Malachy's Miracle, Subway Express, and The Shining Hour.

Among its guest stars were Brian Aherne, Tom Drake, and Margaret Lindsay.
