= Joey Faye's Frolics =

- Genre: comedy/variety
- Country of origin: United States
- Original language: English

Production
- Running time: 30 minutes

Original release
- Network: CBS

Joey Faye's Frolics is an American comedy/variety show that aired on CBS Wednesday night from 9:30 to 10:00 pm Eastern time for two weeks from April 5, 1950 to April 12, 1950. It was replaced by Stage 13.

== Regulars ==
- Joey Faye
- Audrey Christie
- Mandy Kaye
- Danny Dayton
- Joe Silver
