= Mama Rosa =

- Genre: Sitcom
- Country of origin: United States
- Original language: English
- No. of seasons: 1
- No. of episodes: 12

Production
- Camera setup: Multi-camera
- Running time: 30 minutes

Original release
- Network: ABC
- Release: May 21 – June 11, 1950

Mama Rosa is an American sitcom television series that aired from May 21 until June 11, 1950. (The reference book Encyclopedia of Television Shows, 1925 through 2010 describes the program as a drama.)

== Premise ==
Mama Rosa runs a boardinghouse in Hollywood.

== Cast ==
- Anna Demetrio as Mama Rosa
- Beverly Garland as Mama's Daughter
- Richard Anderson as Mama's Son
- Vito Scotti as Nikolai
- John Romano as Cristino
