= The Nash Airflyte Theater =

- Genre: Anthology
- Directed by: Marc Daniels; David Pressman
- Presented by: William Gaxton
- Theme music composer: Otis Clements
- Country of origin: United States
- Original language: English
- No. of seasons: 1
- No. of episodes: 26

Production
- Camera setup: Multi-camera
- Running time: 25 minutes
- Production company: Nash Motor Co.

Original release
- Network: CBS
- Release: September 21, 1950 – March 15, 1951

The Nash Airflyte Theater is an American dramatic anthology television series that was broadcast from September 21, 1950, through March 15, 1951, on CBS on Thursday evenings. It originated from WCBS-TV in New York City at 10:30 p.m. The show was sponsored by the Nash Motor Co.; the Nash Airflyte was an automobile model produced by the company.

William Gaxton was the program's host. Mike Krich was story editor.

The series featured original teleplays and adaptations of works by famous writers, including Anton Chekhov, O.Henry and Agatha Christie.

The program broadcast the first televised adaptation of a Gilbert and Sullivan musical when it aired Trial by Jury on November 30, 1950, and its December 21, 1950, episode, "Molly Morgan", was the first TV adaptation of a work by John Steinbeck. The December 7, 1950, episode is believed to be Ronald Reagan's first TV credit. The initial TV appearances of Ruth Hussey and David Niven occurred on this program.

Nash Motors ended its sponsorship at a time when other automobile manufacturers were also dropping or reducing their sponsorships of TV programs.

== Guest stars ==
Other actors on the series included:

- Joan Bennett
- Van Heflin
- Ann Rutherford

== Production ==
Marc Daniels was the producer and director; Sylvia Friedlander was the production manager.

== Selected episodes ==
Partial List of Episodes of The Nash Airflyte Theater
| Date | Title | Star(s) |
|---|---|---|
| September 21, 1950 | "The Double Dyed Deceiver" | Ian Keith, Ralph Riggs. |
| September 28, 1950 | "Borrowed Memory" | Ruth Hussey, Torin Thatcher, Chester Stratton, Kathryn Grill, Janie Alexander |
| October 5, 1950 | "Portrait of Lydia" | David Niven, Mary Beth Hughes |
| October 12, 1950 | "The Boor" | Fredric March |
| October 19, 1950 | "The Box Supper" | Marguerite Piazza |
| October 26, 1950 | "Municipal Report" | Herbert Marshall |
| November 2, 1950 | "The Cut Glass Bowl" | Martha Scott |
| November 9, 1950 | "I Won't Take a Minute" | Dane Clark |
| November 16, 1950 | "Suppressed Desires" | Lee Bowman |
| November 23, 1950 | "The Doll in the Pink Silk Dress" | Ann Rutherford, Otto Kruger |
| November 30, 1950 | "Trial By Jury" | Patricia Morrison |
| December 3, 1950 | "Mystery of Mrs. Dickenson" | Franchot Tone |
| December 7, 1950 | "The Case of the Missing Lady" or "Disappearance of Mrs. Gordon" | Ronald Reagan |
| December 16, 1950 | "The Windfall" | Gene Lockhart, Peggy Conklin |
| December 21, 1950 | "Molly Morgan" | Barbara Bel Geddes |
| December 28, 1950 | "The Kind Mr. Smith" | Basil Rathbone |
| January 4, 1951 | "Waltz Dream" | Kitty Carlisle, Jimmy Carroll, Ralph Riggs |
| January 11, 1951 | "The Lipstick" | Jane Wyatt |
| January 18, 1951 | "Pot of Gold" | Joan Blondell, Richard Arlen |
| January 22, 1951 | "Manhattan Pastorale" | Teresa Wright |
| January 25, 1951 | "The Calico Dog" | Nina Foch, Lucille Watson |
| February 1, 1951 | "Crisis" | Laraine Day |
| March 8, 1951 | "A Kiss for Mr. Lincoln" | Richard Greene, Grace Kelly |
