= Visit with the Armed Forces =

- Country of origin: United States

Production
- Running time: 30 minutes

Original release
- Network: DuMont
- Release: July 3, 1950 – January 22, 1951

A Visit with the Armed Forces is a 30-minute TV series which aired on the now-defunct DuMont Television Network Mondays at 8pm EST from July 3, 1950, to January 22, 1951. As its title suggests, the series consisted of documentary films on the United States armed forces.

== Episode status ==
Little else is known about the series, and it appears that no episodes survive.

== See also ==
- List of programs broadcast by the DuMont Television Network
- List of surviving DuMont Television Network broadcasts
- 1950-51 United States network television schedule

== Bibliography ==
- David Weinstein, The Forgotten Network: DuMont and the Birth of American Television (Philadelphia: Temple University Press, 2004) ISBN 1-59213-245-6
- Alex McNeil, Total Television, Fourth edition (New York: Penguin Books, 1980) ISBN 0-14-024916-8
- Tim Brooks and Earle Marsh, The Complete Directory to Prime Time Network TV Shows, Third edition (New York: Ballantine Books, 1964) ISBN 0-345-31864-1
