= The Billy Rose Show =

American TV dramatic anthology series (1950–1951)

The Billy Rose Show, aka Billy Rose's Playbill, is a 30-minute American dramatic anthology series produced by Jed Harris. A total of twenty-five episodes aired on the American Broadcasting Company (ABC) from October 3, 1950 to March 27, 1951. Billy Rose served as host. Episodes were based on Rose's newspaper articles.

Guest stars included Leo G. Carroll, Alfred Drake, Burgess Meredith, Otto Preminger, Tom Ewell, Lionel Stander, and Cloris Leachman. Among its directors were Jed Harris and Daniel Petrie, later a prominent feature director. Writers included Paul Osborn, Edward Chodorov, and Ben Hecht.

The program was sponsored by Hudson Motor Car Company.

Episodes included "The Night They Made a Bum Out of Helen Hayes" on October 3, 1950, with Jackie Miles and Murvyn Vye starring.

== Critical response ==
A review in the trade publication Billboard praised the March 9, 1951, episode in which Judith Anderson portrayed an actress who lost her confidence after she appeared in two bad productions. Joe Csida wrote that the episode "demonstrated the force of video for this reviewer as did nothing he has ever seen before." Csida commended the camera work, production, writing, and acting.

John Lester reviewed the premiere episode in The Newark Star-Ledger, saying, "The half-hour itself was very good, Rose's participation not so good." Lester added that Rose had problems in both the opening and the closing segments of the episode, faltering in each. He commended the episode overall as the work of professionals both on screen and behind the scenes, which made viewing the program a pleasure. He wrote that the show "was about as finely written, acted, and produced a bit of drama as television has seen to date".
