= Take a Chance (American game show) =

American TV game show (1950)

- Genre: Game show
- Presented by: Don Ameche
- Country of origin: United States
- Original language: English

Production
- Running time: 30 minutes

Original release
- Network: NBC

Take a Chance is an American game show that aired live on NBC on Sunday night from October 1, 1950, to December 24, 1950. The show was hosted by film actor Don Ameche.

== Format ==
Contestants were chosen from the studio audience and given $5. The contestant was then asked a series of four questions. If the first question was answered correctly, they kept the $5. Other correct answers were worth other winnings. The contestant could quit whenever they no longer wanted to "Take a Chance". If all four questions were answered correctly, the contestant got a chance at the jackpot question worth $1,000 and 1,000 bars of Sweetheart soap.

== Production ==
Richard Lewis was the producer, and Grey Lockwood was the director. Bob Shepherd was the announcer. Nescafé coffee sponsored the program, which was broadcast from New York at 10:30 p.m. Eastern Time on Sundays.

== Critical response ==
Art Cullison wrote in the Akron Beacon Journal that Take a Chance was canceled "due to lack of an audience and heavy costs." He added that the show "got off to a slow start this fall and never was able to regain the lost ground." He also noted, "Ameche seems to have fallen considerably in popularity."

The trade publication Variety called Take a Chance "just another in a seemingly unending string of audience participationers breaking into television, and an exceedingly slow-paced one at that." The review of the premiere episode said that the program's format was similar to the one used on Break the Bank, but the latter had at least five contestants in each 30-minute episode, whereas Take a Chance had two contestants. Additionally, the review said that Ameche "seemed to lack the quizmaster's requisites of sprightly ad libbing and rapid-fire delivery."
