= Stage 13 =

American anthology TV series (1950)

Stage 13 is a 30-minute American anthology television series produced, directed, and written by Wyllis Cooper. It ran on CBS from April 19, 1950, to June 28, 1950.

Featured actors included Leslie Nielsen. Actor Dennis Patrick played one of the first vampires on TV, in an episode of Stage 13.

Episodes, which featured stories of suspense and mystery related to the number 13, were broadcast live from 9:30 to 10 p.m. Eastern Time on Wednesdays, replacing Joey Faye's Frolics. Music was provided by Fred Feibel. The program originated from WCBS-TV.

== Episodes ==
The premiere episode was "Now You Know", written by Draper Lewis. It dealt with "the eerie disappearance of people from a Third Avenue saloon".

The June 14, 1950, episode was "You Have Been Warned", in which Jane White made her TV debut as a dramatic actress.
