= Abe Burrows' Almanac =

- Genre: Variety
- Presented by: Abe Burrows
- Country of origin: United States
- Original language: English
- No. of seasons: 1

Production
- Producer: Abe Burrows
- Camera setup: Multi-camera
- Running time: 24–25 minutes

Original release
- Network: CBS
- Release: January 4 – March 29, 1950

Abe Burrows' Almanac is an American television series that aired on CBS from January 4, 1950, until March 29, 1950.

The live program, hosted by Abe Burrows, featured music, song and comedy performances by guests. The show was broadcast on Wednesday evenings, 9–9:30 p.m. Eastern Time. Milton Delugg conducted the orchestra. It was sustaining.

While Burrows had a successful nightclub act and made regular appearances as a performer on CBS radio programs, this short-lived series is notable for being his only featured role in a television program.

== Critical response ==
A review of the premiere episode in the trade publication Variety said, "... CBS made the mistake of attempting to enhance Burrows with 'production values'". In doing so, the review said, the show "was stripped of the requisite informality and intimacy generally associated with the comic", which made it "downright disappointing".
