= The Hazel Scott Show =

- Presented by: Hazel Scott
- Country of origin: United States

Production
- Running time: 15 mins.

Original release
- Network: DuMont
- Release: July 3 – September 29, 1950

The Hazel Scott Show is an early American television program broadcast on the now defunct DuMont Television Network. The series, hosted by Hazel Scott, ran during the summer of 1950, and was one of the first American network television series to be hosted by any person of African descent.

== Broadcast history ==
The Hazel Scott Show was a 15-minute-long musical program hosted by pianist and singer Hazel Scott, who would perform show tunes and other numbers live on the show. Scott was no stranger to performing before she began appearing on the program: she had appeared in nightclubs, on radio and television programs, on Broadway, and in five feature films. The program first aired on July 3, 1950. The show was produced and distributed by the DuMont network, and aired Monday, Wednesday, and Friday from 7:45 pm to 8 pm ET on most DuMont affiliates. Charles Mingus and Max Roach were among the musicians to back her in these programs. The Joan Edwards Show was in the same time slot on Tuesdays and Thursdays.

Trinidad-born Hazel Scott was described as a "novelty on the entertainment scene", and the series was well received by critics. Variety wrote: "Hazel Scott has a neat little show in this modest package. [The] most engaging element [...] is the Scott personality, which is dignified, yet relaxed, and versatile."

Despite critical acclaim and decent Hooper Ratings, the series was cancelled after just a few months. On June 22, 1950, Scott's name had appeared in Red Channels, an anti-Communist publication which named supposed Communist sympathizers. Although Scott appeared voluntarily before the House Un-American Activities Committee on September 22 and vehemently denied the charges, The Hazel Scott Show found itself without a sponsor.

The DuMont network cancelled the series just one week later, as her being listed in Red Channels meant the series would be very unlikely to get a sponsor, and DuMont likely could not afford a sustained program in the time-slot. The final network telecast was on September 29, 1950. The network replaced the series with The Susan Raye Show which only lasted from October 2 until November 20.

== Episode status ==
As with most DuMont series, there are no episodes known to exist.

== See also ==
- List of programs broadcast by the DuMont Television Network
- List of surviving DuMont Television Network broadcasts
- 1950-51 United States network television schedule
- Amanda – 1948–1949 WABD (DuMont flagship station) series starring African-American actress and singer Amanda Randolph
- Stairway to Stardom – 1950–1951 New Jersey-aired series with disc jockey Bill Cook
- Elder Michaux – 1948–1949 on DuMont, continued afterwards as local series
- Hadda Brooks and The Hadda Brooks Show, 1957 local Los Angeles TV show

== Bibliography ==
- David Weinstein, The Forgotten Network: DuMont and the Birth of American Television (Philadelphia: Temple University Press, 2004) ISBN 1-59213-245-6
- Alex McNeil, Total Television, Fourth edition (New York: Penguin Books, 1980) ISBN 0-14-024916-8
- Tim Brooks and Earle Marsh, The Complete Directory to Prime Time Network and Cable TV Shows 1946–Present, Ninth edition (New York: Ballantine Books, 2007) ISBN 978-0-345-49773-4
- Robert Kenneth Carr, The House Committee on Un-American Activities, 1945–1950 (Ithaca, New York: Cornell University Press, 1952)
- Karen Chilton, Hazel Scott: The Pioneering Journey of a Jazz Pianist from Cafe Society to Hollywood to HUAC (Michigan: University of Michigan Press, 2008)
