= Stars Over Hollywood =

American TV anthology series (1950–1951)

- Also known as: Armour Theatre
- Genre: Anthology
- Written by: Axel Gruenberg; Jack Hively
- Starring: Numerous Hollywood stars
- Country of origin: United States
- Original language: English

Production
- Producer: Axel Gruenberg
- Production companies: Revue Productions; MCA Television

Original release
- Network: NBC
- Release: September 6, 1950 – August 29, 1951

Stars Over Hollywood (also known as Armour Theatre) is an American anthology television series of "original comedies and light dramas" produced by Revue Productions. Revue's first television series, it was a filmed in Hollywood and aired on the National Broadcasting Company (NBC) from September 6, 1950, to August 29, 1951.

Among the guest stars were Mary Stuart in the premiere presentation "Beauty Is a Joy", Raymond Burr, Cameron Mitchell, Ann Rutherford, and Bruce Cabot. Otherwise, the program generally featured lesser-known actors and actresses.

Stars Over Hollywood's producer was Axel Gruenberg. He and Jack Hively were writers for the program. The meat packing company Armour and Company was the sponsor of the program.

Rod Serling's first script, "Grady Everett for the People," was presented on the program on September 13, 1950.

Episodes of Stars Over Hollywood were part of a syndicated syndication package, Famous Playhouse, that was distributed by MCA Television, the syndication division of MCA Inc., in 1953. Other programs in the package were Chevron Theater and Gruen Theater.

== Critical response ==
In 1950, media critic John Crosby wrote: "Stars Over Hollywood is the latest of the programs filmed especially for television in Hollywood and has all the conspicuous weaknesses of the others. ... All the TV productions emanating from Hollywood are slipshod. The actors seem insufficiently rehearsed; the quality of the writing is painfully bad; the casting seems to have been done out of card catalogues, and the direction, to put it mildly, is superficial."
