= Prudential Family Playhouse =

American TV anthology drama series (1950–1951)

- Genre: Anthology drama
- Country of origin: United States
- Original language: English
- No. of seasons: 1
- No. of episodes: 13

Production
- Camera setup: Multi-camera
- Running time: 48 mins.

Original release
- Network: CBS
- Release: October 10, 1950 – March 27, 1951

Prudential Family Playhouse is an American television anthology drama series that aired on live CBS from October 1950 to March 1951. It debuted on October 10, 1950, and ended on March 27, 1951. Sponsored by Prudential Insurance, the series features actors in adaptations of Broadway plays or best selling novels.

Among its stars were Gertrude Lawrence, Ruth Chatterton, Grace Kelly, Bert Lahr, Eva Marie Saint, Jessica Tandy, Helen Hayes, Kay Francis, Kevin McCarthy, and Dorothy Gish. Its writers included playwrights George Abbott, Robert Anderson, Ruth Gordon, and Sidney Howard.

== Episodes ==
Partial List of Episodes of Prudential Family Playhouse
| Date | Title | Actor(s) |
|---|---|---|
| December 5, 1950 | "The Barretts of Wimpole Street" | Hayes, Bethel Leslie |
| December 19, 1950 | "Over 21" | Ruth Gordon |
| January 2, 1951 | "Burlesque" | Lahr |
| February 13, 1951 | "Berkeley Square" | Richard Greene, Kelly |
| February 27, 1951 | "Ruggles of Red Gap" | Cyril Ritchard, Glenda Farrell, Walter Abel |

== Production notes ==
The series was broadcast live from New York City. It broadcast in only twelve cities across the United States because the writers of the properties used in the series refused to allow the show to be broadcast using kinescope.

Prudential Family Playhouse aired on Tuesdays from 8 to 9 p.m. Eastern Time, alternating with Sure As Fate, opposite the highly rated Texaco Star Theater, hosted by Milton Berle. As a result, the series struggled in the ratings. In February 1951, CBS announced that they were canceling the series. The final episode aired on March 27, 1951.

== Critical response ==
Saul Carson wrote in The New Republic, "The dramas you'll see may not be masterpieces, but the acting and production are always excellent." He cited a production of "Skylark" that starred Gertrude Lawrence and Donald Cook, saying, "Miss Lawrence was splendid, and Cook and the rest of the cast knew how to underact for the greatest small-screen effectiveness."
