= 1952 in American television =

This is a list of American television-related events in 1952.

== Events ==
| Date | Event | Ref. |
|---|---|---|
| January 14 | The Today Show makes its debut on NBC. | |
| May 22 | The first televised atomic bomb detonation, billed as "Operation Tumbler–Snapper", is broadcast on KTLA in Los Angeles, and fed to the three major networks via a 140 miles (230 km) microwave link. | |
| September 20 | KPTV in Portland, Oregon, begins broadcasting on channel 27 as the world"s first commercial Ultra High Frequency (UHF) television station. | |
| October 7 | In Philadelphia, Pennsylvania, Bandstand, the predecessor to American Bandstand, debuts on WFIL-TV to change emphasis to teens dancing to popular music records. | |
| November 16 | Television City, at this time known as CBS Television City, opens on Beverly Boulevard in Hollywood, California as the network's first television studio based on the west coast. | |
| November 27 | CBS broadcasts the first telecast of the Macy's Thanksgiving Day Parade from New York City. | |

=== Other notable events in 1952 ===
- The FCC reserves some channels for non-commercial, educational broadcasting.
- The first political advertisements appear on television. The Democratic Party buys a 30-minute time segment for their candidate, Adlai Stevenson, who eventually received unfavorable mail for interfering with a broadcast of I Love Lucy. Dwight Eisenhower buys 20 second commercial segments and wins the election.

== Television programs ==
=== Debuts ===
| Date | Debut | Network |
|---|---|---|
| January 1 | Battle of the Ages | DuMont |
| January 6 | Claudia | NBC |
| January 8 | Quick on the Draw | DuMont |
| January 8 | My Friend Irma | CBS |
| January 13 | CBS Television Workshop | CBS |
| January 14 | Today | NBC |
| February | Steve Randall | DuMont |
| February 12 | Life Is Worth Living | DuMont |
| February 24 | Meet the Masters | NBC |
| February 25 | Guide Right | DuMont |
| March 1 | Death Valley Days | First-run syndication |
| March 5 | The Unexpected | First-run syndication |
| March 6 | The Cases of Eddie Drake | DuMont |
| March 16 | The Week in Religion | DuMont |
| March 19 | It's a Business | DuMont |
| March 20 | Gang Busters | NBC |
| March 22 | Dagmar's Canteen | NBC |
| April | The Paul Dixon Show | DuMont |
| April 14 | Broadway Television Theatre | WOR-TV |
| May | Boxing From Eastern Parkway | DuMont |
| May | Monodrama Theater | DuMont |
| June 1 | China Smith | First-run syndication |
| June 6 | The Campbell Playhouse | NBC |
| June 10 | Meet the Boss | DuMont |
| June 16 | My Little Margie | CBS |
| June 19 | I've Got a Secret | CBS |
| June 20 | Curtain Call | NBC |
| June 30 | Guiding Light | CBS |
| July | Guess What? | DuMont |
| July 1 | The Power of Women | DuMont |
| July 3 | Mister Peepers | NBC |
| July 17 | Operation Information | DuMont |
| August 14 | Pick the Winner | CBS/Dumont |
| August 24 | The Doctor | NBC |
| September | The Abbott and Costello Show | First-run syndication |
| September | The Fisher Family | DuMont |
| September 2 | Where Was I? | DuMont |
| September 6 | Happy's Party | DuMont |
| September 6 | Golf Instruction with Phil Galvano | DuMont |
| September 10 | Stage a Number | DuMont |
| September 13 | Cowboy G-Men | First-run syndication |
| September 14 | New York Times Youth Forum | DuMont |
| September 15 | Famous Fights From Madison Square Garden | DuMont |
| September 19 | Adventures of Superman | First-run syndication |
| September 20 | The Jackie Gleason Show | CBS |
| September 25 | Four Star Playhouse | CBS |
| September 29 | Garfield Goose and Friends | WBKB-TV/WBBM-TV |
| October 1 | Cavalcade of America | NBC |
| October 1 | This Is Your Life | NBC |
| October 1 | Trash or Treasure | DuMont |
| October 3 | Dark of Night | DuMont |
| October 3 | The Adventures of Ozzie and Harriet | ABC |
| October 3 | Gulf Playhouse | NBC |
| October 3 | Mr. and Mrs. North | CBS |
| October 3 | Our Miss Brooks | CBS |
| October 6 | Football Sidelines | DuMont |
| October 6 | One Man's Experience | DuMont |
| October 6 | One Woman's Experience | DuMont |
| October 7 | American Bandstand | WFIL-TV |
| October 7 | Life with Elizabeth | First-run syndication |
| October 7 | Ramar of the Jungle | First-run syndication |
| October 13 | Ladies' Date | DuMont |
| October 14 | Leave It to Larry | CBS |
| October 14 | The Red Buttons Show | CBS |
| October 15 | I Married Joan | NBC |
| October 26 | Victory at Sea | NBC |
| November 6 | Biff Baker, U.S.A. | CBS |
| November 8 | My Hero | NBC |
| November 9 | Omnibus | CBS |
| November 13 | Biff Baker, U.S.A. | CBS |
| November 24 | Ding Dong School | NBC |
| December 1 | The Abbott and Costello Show | First-run syndication |
| December 1 | Report Card for Parents | DuMont |
| December 16 | Wisdom of the Ages | DuMont |
| December 30 | The Ernie Kovacs Show | CBS |

=== Changes of network affiliation ===
| Show | Moved from | Moved to |
|---|---|---|
| Say It with Acting | NBC | ABC |
| The Arthur Murray Party | CBS | Dumont |
| Author Meets the Critics | ABC | Dumont |
| The Drew Pearson Show | ABC | Dumont |
| Youth on the March | ABC | Dumont |
| Rebound | ABC | Dumont |
| Charlie Wild, Private Detective | ABC | Dumont |
| Gruen Playhouse | ABC | Dumont |
| Life Begins at Eighty | NBC | Dumont |

=== Ending this year ===
| Date | Show | Network | Debut | Notes |
|---|---|---|---|---|
| January 1 | We the People | NBC | June 1, 1948 (on CBS) | |
| January 13 | Out There | CBS | October 28, 1951 | |
| February 22 | Say It with Acting | ABC | January 8, 1951 (on NBC) | |
| February 28 | Public Prosecutor | NBC | February 1951 | |
| March 2 | Major Dell Conway of the Flying Tigers | DuMont | April 7, 1951 | |
| March 2 | Stage Entrance | DuMont | May 2, 1951 | |
| March 20 | Shadow of the Cloak | DuMont | June 6, 1951 | |
| March 27 | The Bill Goodwin Show | NBC | September 11, 1951 | |
| March 29 | The Talent Shop | DuMont | October 13, 1951 | |
| April 13 | CBS Television Workshop | CBS | January 13, 1952 | |
| April 19 | Faye Emerson's Wonderful Town | CBS | June 16, 1951 | |
| April 24 | Stop the Music | ABC | May 5, 1949 | |
| March 2 | Major Dell Conway of the Flying Tigers | DuMont | April 7, 1951 | |
| May 21 | It's a Business | DuMont | March 19, 1952 | |
| May 29 | The Cases of Eddie Drake | DuMont | March 6, 1952 | |
| June 4 | Pulitzer Prize Playhouse | ABC | October 6, 1950 | |
| June 5 | Casey, Crime Photographer | CBS | April 19, 1951 | |
| June 14 | Dagmar's Canteen | NBC | March 22, 1952 | |
| June 19 | Charlie Wild, Private Detective | DuMont | December 22, 1950 (on CBS) | |
| June 19 | The Ruggles | DuMont | October 23, 1949 | |
| June 25 | Celanese Theatre | ABC | October 2, 1951 | |
| June 26 | DuMont Royal Theater | DuMont | April 12, 1951 | |
| June 27 | The First Hundred Years | CBS | December 4, 1950 | |
| June 30 | Claudia | CBS | January 6, 1952 (on NBC) | |
| July 4 | Johnny Olson's Rumpus Room | DuMont | January 17, 1949 | |
| August 26 | Guess What | DuMont | July 8, 1952 | |
| September 12 | The Magic Cottage | DuMont | July 18, 1949 | |
| September 18 | Operation Information | DuMont | July 17, 1952 | |
| September 21 | Celebrity Time | CBS | November 20, 1948 | |
| September 26 | Curtain Call | NBC | June 20, 1952 | |
| November 11 | The Power of Women | DuMont | July 1, 1952 | |
| November 13 | The Frank Sinatra Show | CBS | October 7, 1950 | |
| November 24 | Pentagon | DuMont | May 6, 1951 | |
| November 29 | Battle of the Ages | CBS | January 1, 1952 (on DuMont) | |
| December 9 | Quick on the Draw | DuMont | January 18, 1952 | |
| December 10 | The Unexpected | DuMont | March 5, 1952 | |
| December 22 | Famous Fights from Madison Square Garden | DuMont | September 15, 1952 | |
| December 22 | Football Sidelines | DuMont | October 6, 1952 | |
| December 23 | Leave It to Larry | CBS | October 14, 1952 | |
| December 25 | Gangbusters | NBC | March 20, 1952 | |
| Unknown date | At Home with Billie Burke | DuMont | June 1951 | |

== Television stations ==
=== Station launches ===
| Date | City of License/Market | Station | Channel | Affiliation | Notes/Ref. |
|---|---|---|---|---|---|
| July 18 | Denver, Colorado | KFEL-TV | 2 | DuMont | |
| September 20 | Portland, Oregon | KPTV | 27 | NBC (primary); ABC/CBS/DuMont (secondary) | World's first commercial UHF television station; now a Fox affiliate on channel 12. |
| October 12 | Denver, Colorado | KBTV | 9 | CBS (primary); ABC (secondary) | |
| November 1 | Denver, Colorado | KLZ-TV | 7 | CBS | |
| November 13 | Lubbock, Texas | KDUB-TV | 13 | CBS (primary); DuMont (secondary) | |
| November 27 | Austin, Texas | KTBC-TV | 7 | CBS (primary); ABC/DuMont/NBC (secondary) | Now a Fox O&O station |
| December 1 | Honolulu, Hawaii | KGMB | 9 | CBS (primary); NBC (secondary) | |
| December 7 | Colorado Springs, Colorado | KKTV | 11 | CBS (primary); ABC/NBC/DuMont (secondary) | |
| December 11 | Roanoke, Virginia | WSLS | 10 | NBC (primary); ABC (secondary) | |
| December 14 | El Paso, Texas | KROD-TV | 4 | CBS (primary); ABC/DuMont (secondary) | |
| December 15 | Honolulu, Hawaii | KONA-TV | 11 | NBC (primary); DuMont (secondary) | |
| December 20 | Spokane, Washington | KHQ-TV | 6 | NBC (primary); ABC (secondary) | |
| December 21 | Atlantic City, New Jersey | WFPG-TV | 46 | NBC (primary); CBS/ABC/DuMont (secondary) | |
| December 21 | Harrisburg, Pennsylvania | WSBA-TV | 43 | ABC | |
| December 21 | South Bend, Indiana | WSBT-TV | 22 | CBS (primary); ABC/NBC/DuMont (secondary) | |
| December 30 | Mobile, Alabama | WKAB-TV | 48 | Independent | |

=== Network affiliation changes ===
| Date | City of license/Market | Station | Channel | Old affiliation | New affiliation | Notes/Ref. |
|---|---|---|---|---|---|---|
| December 15 | Honolulu, Hawaii | KGMB | 9 | CBS (primary); ABC/NBC (secondary) | CBS (primary); ABC (secondary) | |

=== Station closures ===
| Date | City of license/Market | Station | Channel | Affiliation | First air date | Notes/Ref. |
|---|---|---|---|---|---|---|
| August 23 | Bridgeport, Connecticut | KC2XAK | 24 | NBC | World's first experimental UHF station; a rebroadcast station of WNBT/New York City | |

== Sources ==
- Hollis, Tim (2001). Hi There, Boys and Girls! America's Local Children's TV Programs. University Press of Mississippi. ISBN 978-1-578-06396-3 – via Project MUSE.
- Okuda, Ted; Mulqueen, Jack (2004). The Golden Age of Chicago Children's Television. Lake Claremont Press. ISBN 978-1-893-12117-1.
