= 1952–53 United States network television schedule =

The following is the 1952–53 network television schedule for the four major English language commercial broadcast networks in the United States. The schedule covers primetime hours from September 1952 through March 1953. The schedule is followed by a list per network of returning series, new series, and series cancelled after the 1951–52 season.

According to television historians Castleman and Podrazik (1982), the fall of 1953 marked a change in television when the networks began filling their schedules with "grade B" material. The networks' "need to fill so many hours of broadcasting each day put the networks and local programmers into the same position that Hollywood had been in years before with its theatrical features." In between big-budget productions, the networks had to keep the public occupied. As the number of hours that the four TV networks offered programs continued to expand, "the appearance of TV equivalents to grade-B films was almost inevitable."

Castleman and Podrazik also point out that another change was taking place around this time. Filmed television series had been seen since the late 1940s, but were "not considered very important to the networks' schedules" because many were of poor quality; live productions from New York were the norm at this time. CBS's success with filmed program I Love Lucy in fall 1951, however, had convinced NBC to add a few filmed series to its fall 1952 schedule. Among NBC's new filmed TV series were My Hero, I Married Joan, and Doc Corkle. The Red Skelton Show, previously airing live, also made the move to film. NBC also moved Skelton's program from its previous late-evening time to 7 p.m. on Sundays, hoping the program would be a "strong lead-in for the entire evening."

NBC's Sunday night strategy failed, however, because Red Skelton's program suffered from excessive use of rerun episodes when Skelton unfortunately fell ill. Of the network's other filmed series, My Hero was "a weak slapstick vehicle" while Doc Corkle was "generally regarded as the worst sitcom of the new season". It lasted only three weeks before cancellation (replaced by the return of the live Mister Peepers). With the exceptions of I Married Joan and the revival of The Life of Riley starring William Bendix in January, NBC would have little luck with filmed programs during the 1952–53 season.

ABC had more luck with its new filmed series, The Adventures of Ozzie and Harriet, while CBS aired the filmed Our Miss Brooks. Another successful CBS filmed show was anthology series Four Star Playhouse, which although not a top-rated show, did prove popular enough to run to 1956.

Fall 1952 was a major blow for DuMont, when the network's biggest star, Jackie Gleason, moved from DuMont to CBS. Gleason's new CBS series, The Jackie Gleason Show replaced DuMont's Cavalcade of Stars, airing Saturday nights at 8 p.m. Ted Bergmann, DuMont's general director, stated in 2002 that Gleason's much-heralded move to CBS made DuMont look bad. DuMont aired no programs that fall against Gleason's new TV series. One DuMont show, the 60-minute public affairs program New York Times Youth Forum began airing Sundays at 5 p.m. EST on September 14, 1952—outside of prime time—and ran until June 14, 1953. A notable DuMont series which aired during the season was dramatic anthology series Dark of Night, which was broadcast live from a different real-life location each week instead of being shot on a soundstage (for example, one episode was broadcast from a soft drink bottling plant, while another was broadcast from a castle in New Jersey).

New fall series are highlighted in bold.

Each of the 30 highest-rated shows is listed with its rank and rating as determined by Nielsen Media Research.

Yellow indicates the programs in the top 10 for the season.
Cyan indicates the programs in the top 20 for the season.
Magenta indicates the programs in the top 30 for the season.

== Sunday ==
Network		7:00 PM	7:30 PM	8:00 PM	8:30 PM	9:00 PM	9:30 PM	10:00 PM	10:30 PM
ABC	Fall	You Asked For It	**Enterprise**	**All-Star News**		America in View	**This Is the Life Presents "The Fisher Family"**	Hour of Decision (10:00) / Local (10:15)	**Anywhere U.S.A.**
ABC	Spring	You Asked For It	**Enterprise**	**All-Star News**		America in View	**This Is the Life Presents "The Fisher Family"**	Hour of Decision (10:00) / Local (10:15)	**Both Sides**
CBS	Fall	The Gene Autry Show	This Is Show Business	Toast of the Town		The Fred Waring Show	Break the Bank	The Web	What's My Line? (20/35.3) (Tied with Strike It Rich)
CBS	February	The Gene Autry Show	**Private Secretary**	Toast of the Town		The Fred Waring Show	Break the Bank	The Web	What's My Line? (20/35.3) (Tied with Strike It Rich)
NBC	Fall	The Red Skelton Show (28/33.7) (Tied with The Lone Ranger)	**Doc Corkle**	The Colgate Comedy Hour (7/44.3)		The Philco Television Playhouse (17/37.3) / Goodyear Television Playhouse (15/37.8)		**The Doctor**	Local
NBC	October	The Red Skelton Show (28/33.7) (Tied with The Lone Ranger)	**Mister Peepers**	The Colgate Comedy Hour (7/44.3)		The Philco Television Playhouse (17/37.3) / Goodyear Television Playhouse (15/37.8)		**The Doctor**	Local
NBC	Summer	**Operation Neptune**	**Super Ghost**	The Big Payoff		The Philco Television Playhouse (17/37.3) / Goodyear Television Playhouse (15/37.8)		**The Doctor**	Local
DMN		Georgetown University Forum	Local			Rocky King, Inside Detective	The Plainclothesman	The Arthur Murray Party	Youth on the March

- The Jack Benny Program (12/39.0) appeared every fourth week this season at 7:30-8:00 pm, with **Private Secretary** replacing This Is Show Business in February.
- On October 26, Doc Corkle was replaced by **Mister Peepers** after only three episodes.

== Monday ==
Network		7:00 PM	7:30 PM	8:00 PM	8:30 PM	9:00 PM	9:30 PM	10:00 PM	10:30 PM
ABC		Local	Hollywood Screen Test	Inspector Mark Saber – Homicide Squad	United or Not	**All-Star News**		Local	
CBS	Fall	Local	Douglas Edwards with the News (7:30) / The Perry Como Show (7:45)	Lux Video Theatre	Arthur Godfrey's Talent Scouts (2/54.7)	I Love Lucy (1/67.3)	**Life with Luigi** (13/38.5)	Studio One	
CBS	Summer	Local	Douglas Edwards with the News (7:30) / The Perry Como Show (7:45)	The George Burns and Gracie Allen Show	Arthur Godfrey's Talent Scouts (2/54.7)	Racket Squad	Masquerade Party	Studio One	
NBC	Fall	Local	Those Two (7:30) / Camel News Caravan (7:45)	What's My Name?	The Voice of Firestone	Hollywood Opening Night	Robert Montgomery Presents		Who Said That?
NBC	Spring	Local	Bob and Ray (7:30) / Camel News Caravan (7:45)	What's My Name?	The Voice of Firestone	**Eye Witness**	Robert Montgomery Presents		Who Said That?
NBC	Summer	Local	Bob and Ray (7:30) / Camel News Caravan (7:45)	What's My Name?	The Voice of Firestone	Juvenile Jury	Summer Stock Theatre		Who Said That?
DMN	Fall	Captain Video and His Video Rangers	Local	The Power of Women	The Johns Hopkins Science Review	Guide Right	**Football Sidelines** (9:30) / **Famous Fights From Madison Square Garden** (9:45)	Boxing From Eastern Parkway	
DMN	Follow-up	Captain Video and His Video Rangers	Local	The Power of Women	The Johns Hopkins Science Review	**The Big Idea**	**Football Sidelines** (9:30) / **Famous Fights From Madison Square Garden** (9:45)	Boxing From Eastern Parkway	
DMN	Spring	Captain Video and His Video Rangers	Local	The Power of Women	This Is the Life Presents "The Fisher Family"		**Football Sidelines** (9:30) / **Famous Fights From Madison Square Garden** (9:45)	Boxing From Eastern Parkway	

- What's My Name was subsequently renamed The Paul Winchell Show, after its stars, Paul Winchell and Jerry Mahoney.

== Tuesday ==
Network		7:00 PM	7:30 PM	8:00 PM	8:30 PM	9:00 PM	9:30 PM	10:00 PM	10:30 PM
ABC		Local	The Beulah Show	Local					
CBS		Local	Douglas Edwards with the News (7:30) / **Heaven for Betsy** (7:45)	**Leave It to Larry**	**The Red Buttons Show** (11/40.2)	Crime Syndicated / City Hospital	Suspense	Danger	Local
NBC		Local (7:00) / **Short Short Dramas** (7:15)	The Dinah Shore Show (7:30) / Camel News Caravan (7:45)	Texaco Star Theater (5/46.7) / **The Buick Circus Hour** (once a month) (6/46.0)		Fireside Theatre (10/40.6)	Armstrong Circle Theater	**Two for the Money**	**Embassy Club** (10:30) / On the Line with Considine (10:45)
DMN	Fall	Captain Video and His Video Rangers	Local	Life Is Worth Living	Keep Posted	**Where Was I?**	Quick on the Draw	Local	
DMN	December	Captain Video and His Video Rangers	Local	Life Is Worth Living	Keep Posted	**Where Was I?**	**Wisdom of the Ages**	Local	
DMN	Spring	Captain Video and His Video Rangers	Local	Life Is Worth Living	**The Big Issue**	**Where Was I?**	**Wisdom of the Ages**	Local	
DMN	Summer	Captain Video and His Video Rangers	Local	Your Big Moment/Blind Date	**The Big Issue**	**Where Was I?**	Local	The Big Idea	Local

Note: On December 16, 1952, Wisdom of the Ages replaced Quick on the Draw.

== Wednesday ==
Network	7:00 PM	7:30 PM	8:00 PM	8:30 PM	9:00 PM	9:30 PM	10:00 PM	10:30 PM
ABC	Local	The Name's the Same	**All-Star News**		The Adventures of Ellery Queen	Wrestling From Rainbo Arena		
CBS	Local	Douglas Edwards with the News (7:30) / The Perry Como Show (7:45)	Arthur Godfrey and His Friends (3/47.1)		Strike It Rich (20/35.3) (Tied with What's My Line?)	Man Against Crime	Pabst Blue Ribbon Bouts (10:00) (14/37.9) / Sports Spot (10:45)	
NBC	Local	Those Two (7:30) / Camel News Caravan (7:45)	**I Married Joan**	**Cavalcade of America** / **Scott Music Hall**	Kraft Television Theater		This Is Your Life	Local
DMN	Captain Video and His Video Rangers	**Pro Football Highlights**	Local		**Stage a Number**		Local	

== Thursday ==
Network		7:00 PM	7:30 PM	8:00 PM	8:30 PM	9:00 PM	9:30 PM	10:00 PM	10:30 PM
ABC		Local	The Lone Ranger (28/33.7) (Tied with The Red Skelton Show)	**All-Star News**	Chance of a Lifetime	**Perspectives**	On Guard	Local	
CBS	Fall	Local	Douglas Edwards with the News (7:30) / **Heaven for Betsy** (7:45)	The George Burns and Gracie Allen Show	Amos 'n' Andy (25/34.4) / **Four Star Playhouse**	**Biff Baker, U.S.A.**	Big Town	Racket Squad	I've Got a Secret
CBS	Winter	Local	Douglas Edwards with the News (7:30) / **Heaven for Betsy** (7:45)	The George Burns and Gracie Allen Show	Amos 'n' Andy (25/34.4) / **Four Star Playhouse**	**Biff Baker, U.S.A.**	Big Town	My Little Margie	I've Got a Secret
CBS	Summer	Local	Douglas Edwards with the News (7:30) / **Heaven for Betsy** (7:45)	Take a Guess	Four Star Playhouse / **Tales of the City**	Lux Video Theatre	Big Town	My Little Margie	I've Got a Secret
NBC		Local (7:00) / **Short Short Dramas** (7:15)	The Dinah Shore Show (7:30) / Camel News Caravan (7:45)	You Bet Your Life (9/41.6)	Treasury Men in Action (27/34.2)	Dragnet (4/46.8) / Gang Busters (8/42.4)	**Ford Theatre** (30/33.6)	Martin Kane, Private Eye	Local
DMN		Captain Video and His Video Rangers	Local		Broadway to Hollywood – Headline Clues	Trash or Treasure	What's the Story	Author Meets the Critics	Local

== Friday ==
Network		7:00 PM	7:30 PM	8:00 PM	8:30 PM	9:00 PM	9:30 PM	10:00 PM	10:30 PM
ABC		Local	The Stu Erwin Show*	**The Adventures of Ozzie and Harriet**	**All-Star News**		Tales of Tomorrow	Local	
CBS		Local	Douglas Edwards with the News (7:30) / The Perry Como Show (7:45)	Mama (18/37.0)	My Friend Irma	Schlitz Playhouse of Stars	**Our Miss Brooks** (22/35.0) (Tied with The Big Story)	**Mr. and Mrs. North**	Local
NBC	Fall	**The Herman Hickmann Show** (7:00) / Local (7:15)	Those Two (7:30) / Camel News Caravan (7:45)	The RCA Victor Show Starring Dennis Day	**Gulf Playhouse**	The Big Story (22/35.0) (Tied with Our Miss Brooks)	The Aldrich Family	Gillette Cavalcade of Sports (10:00) (24/34.7) / Greatest Fights of the Century (10:45)	
NBC	Winter	**The Herman Hickmann Show** (7:00) / Local (7:15)	Those Two (7:30) / Camel News Caravan (7:45)	The RCA Victor Show Starring Dennis Day	**The Life of Riley** (16/37.4)	The Big Story (22/35.0) (Tied with Our Miss Brooks)	The Aldrich Family	Gillette Cavalcade of Sports (10:00) (24/34.7) / Greatest Fights of the Century (10:45)	
DMN	Fall	Captain Video and His Video Rangers	Local	**This Is the Life Presents "The Fisher Family"**	**Dark of Night**	Life Begins at Eighty	Local	Twenty Questions	Down You Go
DMN	Follow-up	Captain Video and His Video Rangers	Local	**Steve Randall**	**Dark of Night**	Life Begins at Eighty	Local	Twenty Questions	Down You Go
DMN	Winter	Captain Video and His Video Rangers	Local	City Assignment	**Dark of Night**	Life Begins at Eighty	Local	Twenty Questions	Down You Go

Notes: The RCA Victor Show Starring Dennis Day was aired in the first half of 1952 and was hence not a new series in the 1952-1953 season. It moved to Monday at 9 p.m. on NBC in the 1953-1954 season under the new title The Dennis Day Show, starring singer Dennis Day.

On DuMont, City Assignment, which ran from February to July 1953, consisted entirely of reruns of episodes of the CBS series Big Town.

* also known as Trouble With Father

== Saturday ==
Network		7:00 PM	7:30 PM	8:00 PM	8:30 PM	9:00 PM	9:30 PM	10:00 PM	10:30 PM
ABC		Paul Whiteman's TV Teen Club	Live Like a Millionaire	Feature Playhouse				Local	
CBS		The Stork Club	Beat the Clock	**The Jackie Gleason Show**		**Jane Froman's U.S.A. Canteen**	**Meet Millie**	**Balance Your Budget**	Battle of the Ages
NBC	Fall	Watch Mr. Wizard	My Little Margie	All-Star Revue (26/34.3)		Your Show of Shows (19/36.0)			Your Hit Parade
NBC	November	Watch Mr. Wizard	**My Hero**	All-Star Revue (26/34.3)		Your Show of Shows (19/36.0)			Your Hit Parade
DMN		Local	The Pet Shop	Local			Wrestling From Marigold		

== By network ==
=== ABC ===
**Returning Series**

- The Adventures of Ellery Queen
- America in View
- The Beulah Show
- The Big Picture
- Chance of a Lifetime
- Feature Playhouse
- Hollywood Screen Test
- Hour of Decision
- Inspector Mark Saber – Homicide Squad
- Live Like a Millionaire
- The Name's the Same
- On Guard
- Paul Whiteman's TV Teen Club
- The Stu Erwin Show
- Tales of Tomorrow
- United or Not
- The Voice of Firestone
- The Wednesday Night Fights
- Wrestling from Rainbo Arena
- You Asked For It

**New Series**

- **The Adventures of Ozzie and Harriet**
- **All-Star News**
- **Anywhere U.S.A.**
- **Back That Fact**
- **Both Sides** *
- **The Dotty Mack Show**
- **Enterprise**
- **Fear and Fancy** *
- **Perspectives**
- **Plymouth Playhouse** *
- **This is the Life Presents "The Fisher Family"**
- **Trouble with Father**
- **What's Your Bid?** *

Not returning from 1951–52:

- Admission Free
- After the Deadlines
- The Amazing Mr. Malone
- America's Health
- Betty Crocker Star Matinee
- The Bill Gwinn Show
- Byline
- The Carmel Myers Show
- Celanese Theater
- Charlie Wild, Private Detective
- The Clock
- Crime with Father
- Curtain Call
- Curtain Up
- The Dell O'Dell Show
- Don McNeill's TV Club
- Gruen Guild Playhouse
- Harness Racing
- Herb Shriner Time
- Hollywood Premiere Theatre
- The Jerry Colonna Show
- Lesson in Safety
- Life with Linkletter
- The Marshall Plan in Action
- Massland at Home Party
- Mr. Arsenic
- Mr. District of Attorney
- Music in Velvet
- On Trial
- Other Lands, Other People
- Out of the Fog
- Paul Dixon Show
- Personal Appearance Theater
- Pulitzer Prize Playhouse
- Q.E.D.
- The Ruggles
- Say It with Acting
- Studs' Place
- The Symphony
- Versatile Varieties
- What Do You Think?

=== CBS ===
**Returning Series**

- Amos 'n' Andy
- Arthur Godfrey and His Friends
- Arthur Godfrey's Talent Scouts
- Battle of the Ages (moved from DuMont)
- Beat the Clock
- Big Town
- Break the Bank
- City Hospital
- Crime Syndicated
- Danger
- Douglas Edwards and the News
- Footlights Theater
- The Fred Waring Show
- The Garry Moore Show
- The Gene Autry Show
- The George Burns and Gracie Allen Show
- I Love Lucy
- I've Got a Secret
- The Jack Benny Show
- Lux Video Theatre
- Mama
- Man Against Crime
- My Friend Irma
- My Little Margie (Moved from NBC mid-season)
- Our Miss Brooks
- Pabst Blue Ribbon Bouts
- The Perry Como Show
- Racket Squad
- Saturday Night Jamboree
- Schlitz Playhouse of Stars
- See It Now
- Sports Spot
- The Stork Club
- Strike It Rich
- Studio One
- Suspense
- This Is Show Business
- Toast of the Town
- The Web
- What in the World?
- What's My Line?

**New Series**

- **Balance Your Budget**
- **Bank on the Stars** *
- **Battle of the Ages**
- **Biff Baker, U.S.A.**
- **Four Star Playhouse**
- **General Electric Theater** *
- **Heaven for Betsy**
- **The Jackie Gleason Show**
- **Jane Froman's U.S.A. Canteen**
- **The Larry Storch Show** *
- **Leave It to Larry**
- **Life with Luigi**
- **Medallion Theatre** *
- **Meet Millie**
- **Mr. and Mrs. North**
- **Omnibus**
- **The Red Buttons Show**
- **Willys Theatre Presenting Ben Hecht's Tales of the City** *
- **Your Jeweler's Showcase**
- **Your Play Time** *

Not returning from 1951–52:

- The Al Pearce Show
- CBS Television Workshop
- Crime Photographer
- The Eddy Arnold Show
- Faye Emerson's Wonderful Town
- The Garry Moore Evening Show
- Hollywood Opening Night
- It's News to Me
- The Ken Murray Show
- MLB
- Police Story
- The Sammy Kaye Variety Show
- The Show Goes On
- Songs for Sale
- Star of the Family

=== DuMont ===
**Returning series**

- The Arthur Murray Party (moved from ABC)
- Author Meets the Critics
- The Big Idea
- Boxing from Eastern Parkway
- Broadway to Hollywood – Headline Clues
- Captain Video and His Video Rangers
- Charlie Wild, Private Detective (moved from ABC)
- City Assignment
- Down You Go
- Ford Festival
- Georgetown University Forum
- Guide Right
- The Johns Hopkins Science Review
- Keep Posted
- Life Begins at Eighty
- Life Is Worth Living
- Not for Publication
- The Pet Shop
- The Plainclothesman
- The Power of Women
- Pro Football Highlights
- Quick on the Draw
- Rebound (moved from ABC)
- Rocky King, Inside Detective
- This Is the Life Presents The Fisher Family
- Trash or Treasure
- Twenty Questions
- What's the Story
- Wrestling From Marigold
- Your Big Moment (aka Blind Date)
- Youth on the March (moved from ABC)

**New series**

- **The Big Idea** *
- **Dark of Night**
- **The Dave Garroway Show** *
- **The Dotty Mack Show** *
- **Drama at Eight** *
- **Football Sidelines**
- **Jimmy Hughes, Rookie Cop** *
- **The Old American Barn Dance** *
- **One Woman's Experience**
- **The Paul Dixon Show**
- **The Power of Women**
- **Report Card for Parents** *
- **Stage a Number**
- **Steve Randall** *
- **The Strawhatters** *
- **This Is the Life Presents "The Fisher Family"**
- **Trash or Treasure**
- **Where Was I?**
- **Wisdom of the Ages** *

Not returning from 1951–52:

- The Bigelow Theatre
- The Cases of Eddie Drake
- Cosmopolitan Theatre
- Crawford Mystery Theatre
- Football This Week
- The Gallery of Mme. Liu-Tsong
- Guess What
- Hands of Mystery
- Johnny Olson's Rumpus Room
- Major Dell Conway of the Flying Tigers
- News Gal
- The Pet Shop
- Public Prosecutor
- Shadow of the Cloak
- The Talent Shop
- This is Music

=== NBC ===
**Returning Series**

- The Aldrich Family
- All-Star Revue
- Armstrong Circle Theater
- The Big Payoff
- The Big Story
- Camel News Caravan
- Cameo Theatre
- The Colgate Comedy Hour
- The Dinah Shore Show
- Dragnet
- Fireside Theatre
- Gang Busters
- Gillette Cavalcade of Sports
- Goodyear Television Playhouse
- Greatest Fights of the Century
- Hollywood Opening Night
- The Kate Smith Evening Hour
- Kraft Television Theatre
- Martin Kane, Private Eye
- My Little Margie
- On the Line with Considine
- The Philco Television Playhouse
- Public Prosecutor
- The RCA Victor Show Starring Dennis Day
- The Red Skelton Show
- Robert Montgomery Presents
- Summer Stock Theatre
- Texaco Star Theater
- This Is Your Life
- Those Two
- Treasury Men in Action
- The Voice of Firestone
- Watch Mr. Wizard
- What's My Name
- Who Said That?
- You Bet Your Life
- Your Hit Parade
- Your Show of Shows

**New Series**

- **The Buick Circus Hour**
- **The Campbell Playhouse**
- **Cavalcade of America**
- **Coke Time with Eddie Fisher** *
- **Ding Dong School**
- **Doc Corkle**
- **The Doctor**
- **Embassy Club**
- **Eye Witness** *
- **Gulf Playhouse**
- **The Herman Hickmann Show**
- **I Married Joan**
- **The Life of Riley** *
- **Mister Peepers** *
- **My Hero**
- **My Son Jeep** *
- **Operation Neptune** *
- **The Revlon Mirror Theater** *
- **Scott Music Hall**
- **Short Short Dramas**
- **Super Ghost** *
- **Those Two**
- **Victory at Sea**
- **Your Favorite Story** *

Not returning from 1951–52:

- All-Star Revue
- American Youth Forum
- The Bill Goodwin Show
- Bob and Ray
- Boss Lady
- Chesterfield Sound-off Time
- Duffy's Tavern
- The Freddie Martin Show
- The Halls of Ivy
- Henry Morgan's Great Talent Hunt
- The Kate Smith Evening Hour
- Lights Out
- The Little Show
- Mohawk Showroom
- One Man's Family
- Somerset Maugham TV Theatre
- The Speidel Show/The Paul Winchell Show
- Wayne King
- We, the People
- Young Mr. Bobbin
- Your Prize Story

Note: The * indicates that the program was introduced in midseason.
