= 1952 in television =

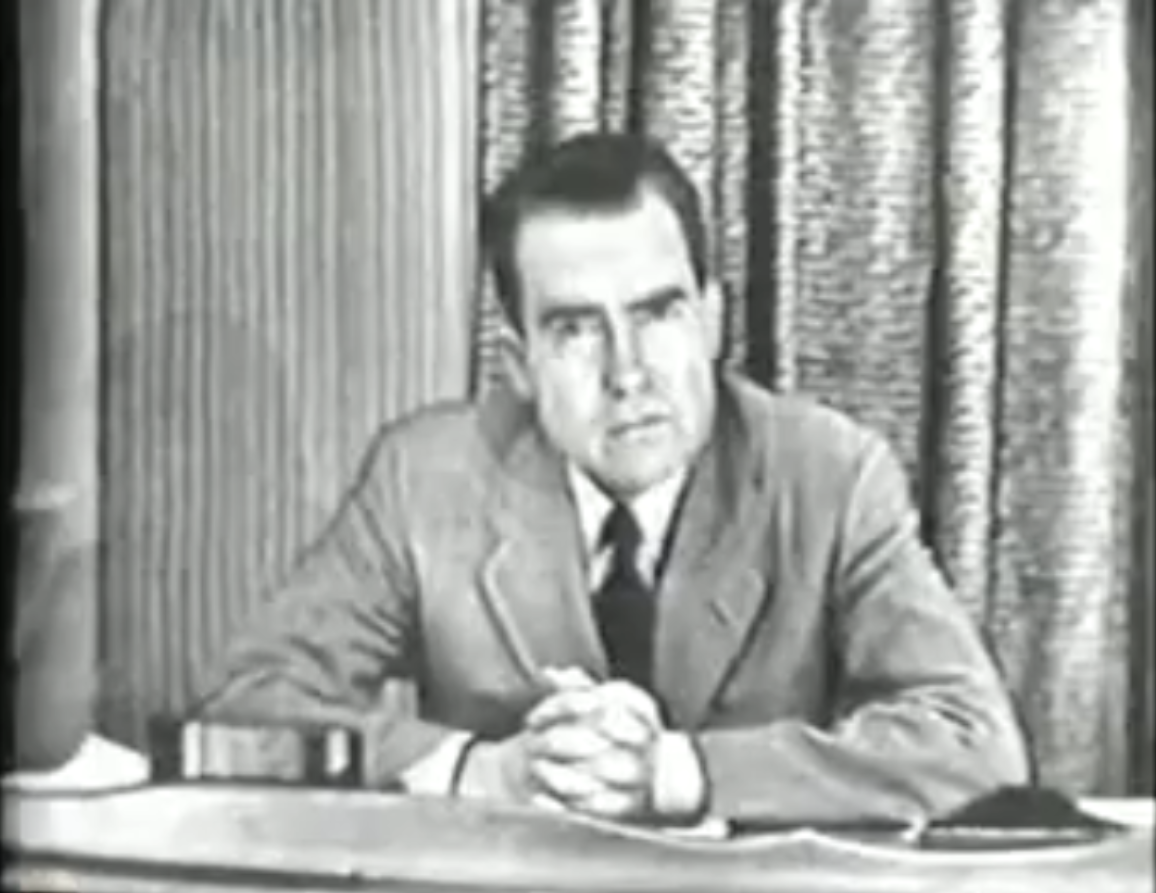
Richard Nixon delivering the Checkers speech, September 23, 1952

The year 1952 in television involved some significant events. Below is a list of television-related events during 1952.

== Events ==
- January 14 – Today is first aired on NBC in the United States with Dave Garroway as host.
- January 16 – Sooty, Harry Corbett's little yellow glove puppet teddy bear, first appears on the BBC Television Service's Talent Night in the United Kingdom.
- February 1 – The first TV detector van is commissioned in the U.K. as the beginning of a clampdown on the estimated 150,000 British households that watch television illegally without a licence.
- March 14 – The BBC Television Service in Scotland is launched.
- May 22 – The first televised atomic bomb detonation, billed as "Operation Tumbler–Snapper", is broadcast on KTLA in Los Angeles, and fed to the three major U.S. networks via a 140 miles (230 km) microwave link.
- July 7 – Turkey's first television station, ITU TV, is opened.
- July 7-11 and 21-26 — television broadcasts of the 1952 Republican and Democratic National Conventions mark the first national live broadcasts of United States presidential conventions
- July 20 – Arrow to the Heart, the first collaboration between director Rudolph Cartier and scriptwriter Nigel Kneale, is broadcast by BBC Television in the United Kingdom.
- August 1 – First television broadcast in the Dominican Republic by La Voz Dominicana, a station based on the radio station of the same name.
- September 6 – Television debuts in Canada with the initiation of CBFT in Montreal, Quebec.
- September 8 – CBLT in Toronto, Ontario begins broadcasting as Canada's second television station.
- September 20 – The first commercial Ultra High Frequency (UHF) television station in the world, KPTV (later a Fox company affiliate), begins broadcasting in Portland, Oregon on channel 27.
- October 7 – WFIL-TV Philadelphia's afternoon series Bandstand, which will become American Bandstand, changes emphasis to teens dancing to popular records
- November 4 – 1952 United States presidential election: The first political advertisements have appeared on U.S. television. Democrats bought a 30-minute time segment for their candidate, Adlai Stevenson but he has received unfavorable mail for interfering with a broadcast of I Love Lucy. Dwight Eisenhower bought 20 second commercial segments and wins the election.
- November 16 – CBS Television City in Hollywood, California opens, the network's first studio on the U.S. west coast.
- The U.S. Federal Communications Commission reserves channels for non-commercial public broadcasting.
- There are approximately 146,000 television sets in Canada and most antennas are pointed towards WBEN-TV (later WIVB) in Buffalo, New York.

== Programs/programmes ==
- Amos & Andy (1951–1953)
- Author Meets the Critics (1947–1954)
- Bozo the Clown (1948–present)
- Café Continental (UK) (1947–1953)
- Candid Camera (1948–present)
- Cisco Kid (1950–1956)
- The Colgate Comedy Hour (1950–1955)
- Come Dancing (UK) (1949–1995)
- Dragnet (1951–1959)
- Gillette Cavalcade of Sports (1946–1960)
- Hallmark Hall of Fame (1951–present)
- Hawkins Falls (1950, 1951–1955)
- Howdy Doody (1947–1960)
- I Love Lucy (1951–1960)
- Juvenile Jury (1947–1954)
- Kaleidoscope (UK) (1946–1953)
- Kraft Television Theater (1947–1958)
- Kukla, Fran and Ollie (1947–1957)
- Life with Elizabeth (1952–1955)
- Love of Life (1951–1980)
- Martin Kane, Private Eye (1949–1954)
- Meet the Press (1947–present)
- Muffin the Mule (UK) (1946–1955)
- Search for Tomorrow (1951–1986)
- Television Newsreel (UK) (1948–1954)
- The Ed Sullivan Show (1948–1971)
- The George Burns and Gracie Allen Show (1950–1958)
- The Goldbergs (1949–1955)
- The Jack Benny Show (1950–1965)
- The Roy Rogers Show (1951–1957)
- The Texaco Star Theater (1948–1953)
- The Voice of Firestone (1949–1963)
- Truth or Consequences (1950–1988)
- What's My Line (1950–1967)
- Your Hit Parade (1950–1959)
- Your Show of Shows (1950–1954)

=== Debuts ===
- January 6 - Claudia on NBC (moved to CBS on March 31, 1952)
- January 14 – The Today Show on NBC (1952–present)
- March 1 – Death Valley Days in syndication (1952–1975)
- June 19 – I've Got a Secret on CBS (1952–1967)
- June 30 – the soap opera The Guiding Light (1952–2009) on CBS, which began on radio in 1937, becoming the longest-running regularly scheduled drama in television history
- July 10 - The prime time version of A Date with Judy debuts on ABC.
- September – the religious drama This Is the Life on DuMont, and ran until the late 1980s
- September 19 – Adventures of Superman in syndication (1952–1958)
- October 5 - The Billy Daniels Show on ABC (1952).
- October 26 – Victory at Sea (1952–1953) on NBC, one of the first historic documentary series
- November 1 – Hockey Night in Canada on CBC (1952–present)
- November 6 – Biff Baker, U.S.A. on CBS (1952–1953)
- November 8 – My Hero on NBC (1952–1953)
- December 1 – The Abbott and Costello Show in syndication (1952–1954)
- December 15 – Flower Pot Men on BBC Television (1952)
- American Bandstand, originally called Bandstand, as a local program in Philadelphia (1952–1989)
- Life Is Worth Living with Bishop Fulton J. Sheen on DuMont (1952–1955), then on ABC (1955–1957)
- My Little Margie (1952–1955), starring Gale Storm
- See It Now, hosted by Edward R. Murrow
- The Adventures of Ozzie and Harriet on ABC (1952–1966)
- The Ernie Kovacs Show, where Kovacs explores the boundaries of television technology with his use of special effects (1952–1953)
- Meet the Masters, a program about classical music, on NBC and WGN-TV
- This Is Your Life in the U.S. (1952–1961)
- Life with Elizabeth, a sitcom featuring Betty White (1952–1955)

=== Ending during 1952 ===
Date	Show	Debut
February 23	A Date with Judy (daytime version)	1951
March 27	The Bill Goodwin Show	1951
April 11	Faye Emerson's Wonderful Town	1951
April 24	Stop the Music	1949
June 30	Claudia	1952
August 23	Assignment Manhunt	1951
December 28	The Billy Daniels Show	1952
Unknown	Picture Page (UK)	1946

== Births ==
Date	Name	Notability
January 2	Wendy Phillips	Actress (Falcon Crest)
January 2	Ng Man-tat	Hong Kong actor (Shaolin Soccer) (died 2021)
January 3	Jim Ross	Professional wrestling commentator
January 12	Walter Mosley	Author
January 19	Beau Weaver	Voice actor
January 20	Dave Fennoy	Voice actor
January 27	Patti Burns	Anchor (d. 2001)
January 28	Bruce Helford	Writer
February 16	Stella Farentino	Actress
February 17	Garry Chalk	Voice actor
February 19	Sara Moulton	Chef and television host
February 29	Sharon Dahlonega Bush	Television newscaster
February 29	Albert Welling	Television actor
March 2	Janice Burgess	American TV executive, producer, screenwriter (The Backyardigans, Nick Jr., Winx Club) (d. 2024)
March 2	Laraine Newman	Comic actress (Saturday Night Live)
March 4	Ronn Moss	Actor, musician (The Bold and the Beautiful)
March 7	Lynn Swann	Broadcaster
March 11	Susan Richardson	Actress (Eight is Enough)
March 21	Andrew D. Weyman	Director
March 22	Bob Costas	Sportscaster
April 1	Annette O'Toole	Actress (Smallville)
April 5	Mitch Pileggi	Actor (The X-Files)
April 6	Marilu Henner	Actress (Taxi)
April 6	Erin Moriarty	American television news reporter
April 10	Steven Seagal	Actor
April 16	Billy West	Voice actor (Doug, The Ren and Stimpy Show, Futurama)
April 17	Joe Alaskey	Actor (Looney Tunes), (d. 2016)
April 27	Larry Elder	Political commentator
April 27	George Gervin	NBA basketball player
April 28	Mary McDonnell	Actress
April 29	Nora Dunn	Actress, comedian (Saturday Night Live)
May 2	Christine Baranski	Actress (Cybill, The Good Wife)
May 4	Michael Barrymore	British comedian, presenter
May 6	Gregg Henry	Actor, musician
May 6	Michael O'Hare	Actor (Babylon 5) (d. 2012)
May 6	Fred Newman	Actor (Doug, Between the Lions)
May 11	Frances Fisher	Actress (The Edge of Night)
May 11	Shohreh Aghdashloo	Actress
May 18	George Strait	Actor
May 21	Mr. T	Actor (B. A. Baracus on The A-Team)
May 21	Richard Dominick	American television producer
May 23	John Quiñones	ABC News correspondent
June 7	Liam Neeson	Actor
June 14	Eddie Mekka	Actor (Laverne & Shirley) (d. 2021)
June 18	Carol Kane	Actress (Taxi)
June 20	John Goodman	Actor (Roseanne)
June 22	Graham Greene	Actor
June 28	Alan Pasqua	Composer
June 28	Debbie Zipp	Actress
July 1	Dan Aykroyd	Comedian and actor (Saturday Night Live)
July 1	Brian George	Israeli-British actor (The Edison Twins, The Big Bang Theory, Kim Possible, Green Lantern: The Animated Series)
July 6	Grant Goodeve	American actor (Eight is Enough)
July 9	John Tesh	American composer
July 11	Stephen Lang	Actor
July 14	Stan Shaw	Actor (Houseguest)
July 15	Terry O'Quinn	Actor (Lost)
July 17	David Hasselhoff	Actor (Knight Rider, Baywatch)
July 20	Thom Beers	Voice actor
July 27	Roxanne Hart	Actress (Chicago Hope)
August 1	Brian Patrick Clarke	Actor
August 4	Bobby Buntrock	Actor (Hazel) (d. 1974)
August 5	Louis Walsh	Irish music manager
August 7	Caroline Aaron	Actress
August 10	Daniel Hugh Kelly	Actor (Hardcastle and McCormick)
August 16	Reginald VelJohnson	Actor (Family Matters)
August 16	Caitlin O'Heaney	Actress (Tales of the Gold Monkey)
August 18	Patrick Swayze	Actor and dancer (d. 2009)
August 19	Jonathan Frakes	Actor (Star Trek: The Next Generation), director
August 20	Brenda Blackmon	American anchor
August 27	Paul Reubens	Comic actor (Pee-wee's Playhouse, Batman: The Brave and the Bold) (d. 2023)
August 29	Deborah Van Valkenburgh	Actress (Too Close for Comfort)
September 2	Leslie Cockburn	American investigative journalist
September 5	Michael Horton	Actor (Murder, She Wrote)
September 9	Angela Cartwright	Actress (Make Room for Daddy, Lost in Space)
September 16	Mickey Rourke	American actor
September 19	David Hoberman	American film and television producer
September 25	Christopher Reeve	Actor (d. 2004)
September 25	Tommy Norden	Actor (Flipper)
September 25	Toukie Smith	Actress (227)
September 27	Gail Edwards	Actress (It's a Living, Full House, Blossom)
September 30	John Finn	Actor (Cold Case)
October 9	Sharon Osbourne	TV personality (The Osbournes, The Talk)
October 14	Harry Anderson	Actor (Night Court) (d. 2018)
October 18	Chuck Lorre	Television director, writer, producer, composer, and actor
October 20	Melanie Mayron	Actress, director (Thirtysomething)
October 22	Jeff Goldblum	Actor (Law & Order: Criminal Intent)
October 27	Ted Wass	Actor, director (Soap, Blossom)
October 27	Michael H. Shamberg	Director (d. 2014)
October 28	Annie Potts	Actress (Designing Women)
October 30	Emily Kuroda	Actress (Gilmore Girls)
November 3	Roseanne Barr	Actress, comedian (Roseanne)
November 3	Jim Cummings	Voice actor (The New Adventures of Winnie the Pooh, Darkwing Duck, CatDog)
November 5	Bill Walton	NBA basketball player (died 2024)
November 6	Gary Goetzman	American film and television producer and actor
November 8	Alfre Woodard	Actress
November 9	John Megna	Actor (d. 1995)
November 15	Randy Savage	Pro wrestler and actor (WWE, WCW), (d. 2011)
November 28	S. Epatha Merkerson	Actress (Law & Order)
November 29	Jeff Fahey	Actor (The Marshal, Lost)
November 30	Mandy Patinkin	Actor (Criminal Minds)
December 2	Keith Szarabajka	Actor
December 3	Benny Hinn	Christian televangelist
December 9	Michael Dorn	Actor (Star Trek: The Next Generation)
December 10	Susan Dey	Actress (The Partridge Family, L.A. Law)
December 10	Clive Anderson	English presenter
December 12	Sarah Douglas	Actress (Falcon Crest)
December 15	Lee Aronsohn	American television writer, composer and producer
December 20	Ray Bumatai	Actor (Tito Makani on Rocket Power) (d. 2005)
December 23	Bill Kristol	Writer
December 25	CCH Pounder	Actress (ER, Rocket Power)
December 29	Robert Wightman	Actor (The Waltons)

== Television debuts ==
- Mabel Albertson – Chevron Theatre
- Margaret Bert – Fireside Theatre
- Claire Bloom – Sunday Night Theatre
- Joe E. Brown – The Buick Circus Hour
- G. Pat Collins – Mr. and Mrs. North
- Buster Crabbe – The Philco Television Playhouse
- Richard Crenna – I Love Lucy
- Irene Dunne – Schlitz Playhouse
- William Hickey – The Philco Television Playhouse
- Allen Jenkins – Racket Squad
- Carolyn Jones – Chevron Theatre
- Peter Lorre – Lux Video Theatre
- Steve McQueen – Family Affair
- Sal Mineo – Hallmark Hall of Fame
- Marilyn Monroe – The Jack Benny Program
- Rita Moreno – Fireside Theatre
- Audie Murphy – Lux Video Theatre
- Pat O'Brien – Betty Crocker Star Matinee
- Maureen O'Sullivan – Hollywood Opening Night
- Geraldine Page – Lux Video Theatre
- Donald Pleasence – Sunday Night Theatre
- Sidney Poitier – CBS Television Workshop
- Bert Remsen – Suspense
- Mickey Rooney – Celanese Theatre
- Chris Sarandon – Guiding Light
- Peter Sellers – Don't Spare the Horses
- Sylvia Sidney – Cameo Theatre
- Ann Sothern – Schlitz Playhouse
- Joe Turkel – Boston Blackie
- Lee Van Cleef – Sky King
- Dennis Weaver – Dragnet
- Billie Whitelaw – The Secret Garden
- Stuart Whitman – The Roy Rogers Show
- Joanne Woodward – Tales of Tomorrow
