= Top-rated United States television programs of 1952–53 =

This table displays the top-rated primetime television series of the 1952–53 season as measured by Nielsen Media Research.

Rank	Program	Network	Rating
1	I Love Lucy	CBS	67.3
2	Arthur Godfrey's Talent Scouts	CBS	54.7
3	Arthur Godfrey and His Friends	CBS	47.1
4	Dragnet	NBC	46.8
5	Texaco Star Theater	NBC	46.7
6	The Buick Circus Hour	NBC	46.0
7	The Colgate Comedy Hour	NBC	44.3
8	Gangbusters	NBC	42.4
9	You Bet Your Life	NBC	41.6
10	Fireside Theatre	NBC	40.6
11	The Red Buttons Show	CBS	40.2
12	The Jack Benny Show	CBS	39.0
13	Life with Luigi	CBS	38.5
14	Pabst Blue Ribbon Bouts	CBS	37.9
15	Goodyear TV Playhouse	NBC	37.8
16	The Life of Riley	NBC	37.4
17	Philco TV Playhouse	NBC	37.3
18	Mama	CBS	37.0
19	Your Show of Shows	NBC	36.0
20	What's My Line?	CBS	35.3
20	Strike It Rich	CBS	35.3
22	Our Miss Brooks	CBS	35.0
22	The Big Story	NBC	35.0
24	Gillette Cavalcade of Sports	NBC	34.7
25	Amos 'n' Andy	CBS	34.4
26	All Star Revue	NBC	34.3
27	Treasury Men in Action	NBC	34.2
28	The Red Skelton Show	NBC	33.7
28	The Lone Ranger	ABC	33.7
30	Ford Theatre	NBC	33.6
