= Viewers' Viewpoint =

British TV series (1947–1948)

- Country of origin: United Kingdom
- No. of episodes: 5

Original release
- Release: 1947 – 1948

Viewers' Viewpoint is a British television series which aired 1947 to 1948 on the BBC. Consisting of five episodes, the series presented discussions on television programmes with critics and viewers. It was one of the earliest television programmes about television itself, along with the American series Eye Witness from the same period.
