= List of science fiction television programs, O =

This is an inclusive list of science fiction television programs whose names begin with the letter O.

== O ==
Live-action

- Object Z (franchise):
  - Object Z (1965, UK) IMDb
  - Object Z Returns (1966, UK) IMDb
- Ocean Girl (1994–1998, Australia) a.k.a. Ocean Odyssey (UK)
- Odyssey, The (1992–1995, Canada)
- Odyssey 5 (2002, Canada)
- Omega Factor, The (1979, UK)
- On the Beach (2000, film)
- Operation Neptune (1953) IMDb
- Origin (2018)
- Orphan Black (2013–2017, Canada)
- Orville, The (2017–present)
- Other Space (2015)
- Others, The (2000)
- Otherworld (1985)
- Out of This World (franchise):
  - Out of This World (1962, UK)
  - Out of This World (1987–1991)
- Out of Time (1988, film, pilot)
- Out of the Unknown (1965–1971, UK, anthology)
- Out There (1951–1952)
- Outcasts (2011, UK)
- Outer Limits, The (anthology) (franchise):
  - Outer Limits, The (1963–1965, anthology)
  - Outer Limits, The (1995–2002, anthology)
- Overdrawn at the Memory Bank (1983, film)

Animation

- Ōban Star-Racers (2006, France/Japan, animated)
- Outer Space Astronauts (2009, partly animated)
- Outlaw Star (1998, Japan, animated)
- Overman King Gainer (2002–2003, Japan, animated)
- Owl, The a.k.a. La Chouette (2003–2006, France, shorts, animated) (elements of science fiction in the "Flying Saucer" episode)
- Ozzy & Drix a.k.a. The Fantastic Voyage Adventures of Osmosis Jones & Drixenol (2002–2004, animated)
