= Frank Bunetta =

American television director and producer

Frank Bunetta was an American television director and producer.

== Early years ==
When Bunetta was 10 years old, he performed as "the Boy Without a Body" in the Sells Floto Circus. He later worked with TV developer Allen B. DuMont in an association that led to his career in video.

== Career ==
Bunetta's TV career began when he was an employee at the DuMont Laboratories who worked at night at WABD-TV. In 1947, Bunetta was technical director of a TV adaptation of A Christmas Carol on the DuMont Television Network. By April 1949, he had been promoted to production supervisor for Dumont TV.

Bunetta directed Jackie Gleason in 1951 when Gleason was host of the variety show Cavalcade of Stars. He went on to direct other programs, including Your Show of Shows and Ernie Kovacs's program, before he reunited with Gleason in 1962 to direct The Jackie Gleason Show. Frank Philbin, who produced the Gleason show, described Bunetta as "ingenious and creative, a very good comedy director". Other TV on series for which Bunetta was director, producer, or both included Dark of Night, The Garry Moore Show, It's a Business, Mary Kay and Johnny, The Adventures of Oky Doky, Battle of the Ages, What's Your Bid?, and Johnny Jupiter. TV specials for which Bunetta was director, producer, or both included Holiday on Wheels (CBS 1959), The Sid Caesar Special (CBS 1959), The CBS All Star Circus (1960 and 1961), and The Jackie Gleason Christmas Special (CBS 1966).

== Personal life and death ==
Bunetta was married to Terry Hicks, and they had three children. He retired from show business in 1970 and had open-heart surgery in 1974. In 1976, he dedicated his life to God and began studying to be a minister. He died in Lafayette, Louisiana, on March 31, 1978, aged 61.
