= Doc Corkle =

- Starring: Eddie Mayehoff
- Country of origin: United States
- Original language: English

Production
- Running time: 30 minutes

Original release
- Network: NBC Television

Doc Corkle is an American sitcom that was broadcast on NBC Television from October 5 through October 19, 1952. The show was cancelled after 3 episodes and replaced by Mister Peepers. Insufficient ratings were reported to be the cause of the switch.

== Premise ==
The series focused on Doc Corkle, a dentist with both money and eccentric-relative problems. Good natured Doctor Ambrose Corkle is a widower who lives with his sister Nellie, teenage daughter Laurie, and his father Simon, who tries to help out by fixing things, though his repairs aren't always successful. His well-meaning, but blundering, cousin Melinda has a wealthy son named Winfield "Windy" Dill, who is attracted to Laurie, though the teen is not interested in him. Since many of Doc Corkle's patients fail to pay him, he has to ask Windy for financial assistance.

== Cast ==
- Eddie Mayehoff as Doc Corkle
- Billie Burke as Melinda Dill
- Arnold Stang as Winfield "Windy" Dill
- Hope Emerson as Nellie Corkle
- Connie Marshall as Laurie Corkle
- Chester Conklin as Simon Corkle

== Production ==
The program was sponsored by the Reynolds Metals Company, with a contract for 39 weekly episodes. The program was filmed by Key Productions at Eagle-Lion Studios in Hollywood. The producer was Lou Place, and the director was Dick Bare. Writers were Bob Fisher, Devery Freeman, and Alan Lipscott. Although the series ended after only three episodes, all of the cast, with the exception of Eddie Mayehoff, was paid for the full 39 weeks. Mayehoff's contract included a clause that stated if the series was cancelled within four weeks he would not be paid for any additional weeks.

== Schedule and competition ==
Doc Corkle was broadcast on Sunday nights from 7:30 to 8:00 pm, Eastern Time. The competing network shows were This is Show Business on CBS and Hot Seat on ABC.

== See also ==
- 1952-53 United States network television schedule
