= Wisdom of the Ages =

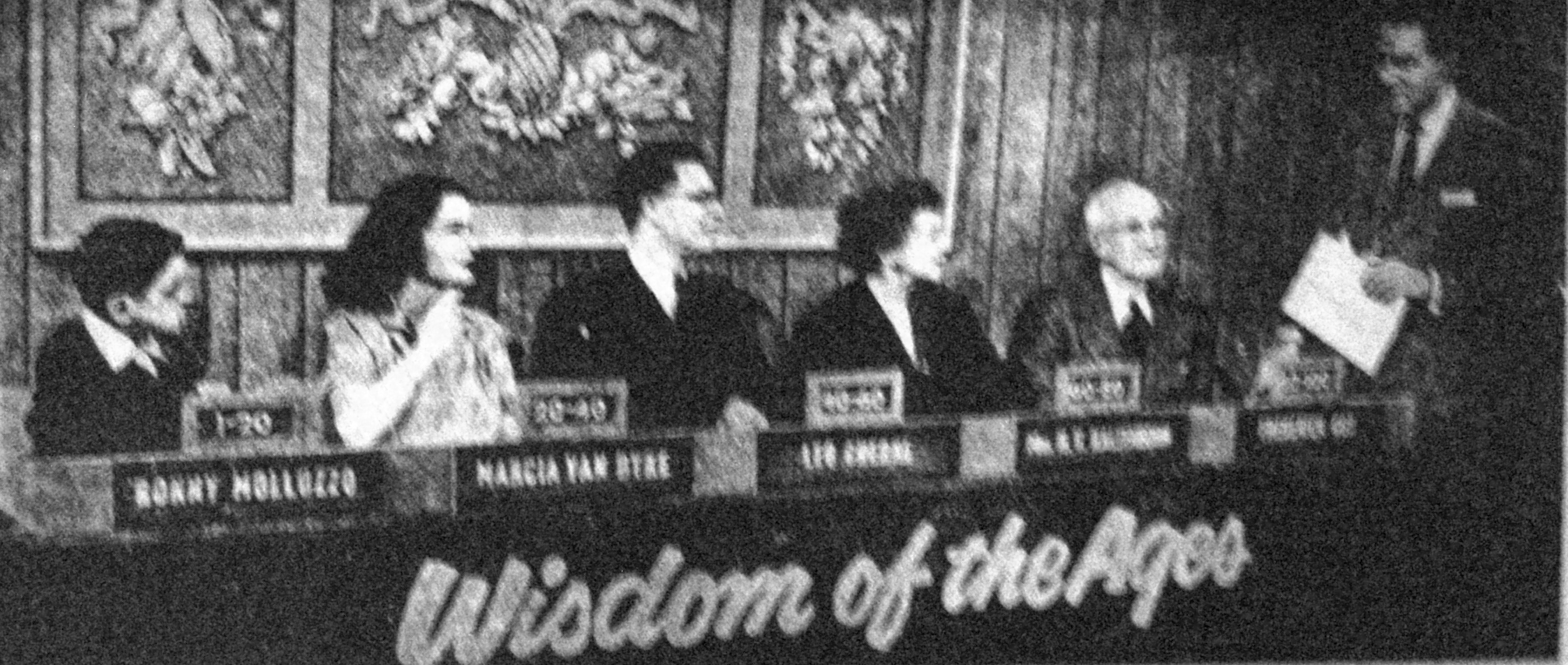
- Publicity shot
- Genre: Panel show
- Presented by: Jack Barry
- Country of origin: United States
- Original language: English

Production
- Running time: 23-25 minutes

Original release
- Network: DuMont
- Release: December 16, 1952 – June 30, 1953

Wisdom of the Ages is a panel show aired on the DuMont Television Network from December 16, 1952, to June 30, 1953. The show combined the ideas of Juvenile Jury and Life Begins at Eighty, with a panel ranging from youth to the elderly. Wisdom of the Ages aired Tuesdays at 9:30pm ET, and replaced Quick on the Draw which ended December 9, 1952.

The show was hosted by Jack Barry, and was a production of Barry & Enright Productions. Viewers submitted often-amusing questions or problems to be discussed by five panelists from different age groups – under 20 (Ronnie Mulluzzo, age 8), 20-40 (Marcia Van Dyke, age 28), 40-60 (Leo Cherne, age 40), 60-80 (Mrs. H. V. Kaltenborn, age 64), and over 80 years old (Thomas Clark, age 82). Marcia Van Dyke was Jack Barry's wife.

The panelists gave their opinion on such topics as spanking children and wives who worked outside of the home. The eight-year-old and 82-year-old panelists were most often in agreement with each other.

== Episode status ==
An episode from June 16, 1953, survives at the UCLA Film and Television Archive.

== See also ==
- List of programs broadcast by the DuMont Television Network
- List of surviving DuMont Television Network broadcasts
- 1952-53 United States network television schedule

== Bibliography ==
- David Weinstein, The Forgotten Network: DuMont and the Birth of American Television (Philadelphia: Temple University Press, 2004) ISBN 1-59213-245-6
- Alex McNeil, Total Television, Fourth edition (New York: Penguin Books, 1980) ISBN 0-14-024916-8
- Tim Brooks and Earle Marsh, The Complete Directory to Prime Time Network and Cable TV Shows, Ninth edition (New York: Ballantine Books, 2007) ISBN 978-0345497734
