= Pro Football Highlights =

American TV sports program

- Also known as: Football News; Football Highlights; Time for Football
- Genre: Sports
- Starring: Joe Hasel (ABC); Steve Owen (DuMont, 1951-53); Jim Leaming (1954)
- Country of origin: United States
- Original language: English

Production
- Running time: 30 minutes
- Production company: Tel Ra

Original release
- Network: ABC (1950–1951); DuMont (1951–1953)
- Release: September 15, 1950 – December 1954

Pro Football Highlights, also known as Football News, Football Highlights and Time for Football, is a 30-minute television sports review program broadcast by ABC (1950–1951) and the DuMont Television Network (1951–1954). The ABC version aired Fridays at 8:30 pm ET and the DuMont version aired Wednesdays at 7:30pm ET from 1951 to 1954.

== Episode status ==
Two episodes of Time for Football (which aired during the 1954 season), exist, featuring games from Week 1 and Week 6.

== See also ==
- List of programs broadcast by the DuMont Television Network
- List of surviving DuMont Television Network broadcasts
- 1950-51 United States network television schedule
- 1951-52 United States network television schedule
- 1952-53 United States network television schedule

== Bibliography ==
- David Weinstein, The Forgotten Network: DuMont and the Birth of American Television (Philadelphia: Temple University Press, 2004) ISBN 1-59213-245-6
- Alex McNeil, Total Television, Fourth edition (New York: Penguin Books, 1980) ISBN 0-14-024916-8
- Tim Brooks and Earle Marsh, The Complete Directory to Prime Time Network TV Shows, Third edition (New York: Ballantine Books, 1964) ISBN 0-345-31864-1
