= Stage a Number =

- Starring: Bill Wendell (host)
- Country of origin: United States
- Original language: English

Production
- Producer: Roger Gerry
- Running time: 60 minutes

Original release
- Network: DuMont
- Release: September 10, 1952 – May 20, 1953

Stage a Number is a TV series on the DuMont Television Network which was broadcast in the US on Wednesdays at 9pm ET from September 10, 1952, to May 20, 1953.

Bill Wendell was the host for the program, which was a live talent show for dancers, singers, acrobats and other entertainers. A panel of celebrity judges decided on two winners who were invited to appear the following week.

== Production ==
Stage a Number was a sustaining program that originated at WABD. Roger Gerry was the producer, and Barry Shear was the director. Bill Dalzell was the writer, and Bill Wirges was the music director. It was replaced by The Strawhatters.

== Episode status ==
As with most DuMont series, no episodes are known to exist.

== See also ==
- List of programs broadcast by the DuMont Television Network
- List of surviving DuMont Television Network broadcasts
- 1952-53 United States network television schedule

== Bibliography ==
- David Weinstein, The Forgotten Network: DuMont and the Birth of American Television (Philadelphia: Temple University Press, 2004) ISBN 1-59213-245-6
- Alex McNeil, Total Television, Fourth edition (New York: Penguin Books, 1980) ISBN 0-14-024916-8
- Tim Brooks and Earle Marsh, The Complete Directory to Prime Time Network TV Shows, Third edition (New York: Ballantine Books, 1964) ISBN 0-345-31864-1
