= Operation Success =

American TV public affairs series (1948–1949)

- Starring: Bob Pfeiffer
- Country of origin: United States

Production
- Running time: 30 minutes

Original release
- Network: DuMont
- Release: September 21, 1948 – June 16, 1949

Operation Success is a prime time public affairs television program broadcast on the now-defunct DuMont Television Network from September 21, 1948 to October 19, 1948, and from January 27, 1949, to June 16, 1949.

== Broadcast history ==
The program aired from September 1948 to June 1949, initially on Tuesdays at 8 p.m. EST, opposite Texaco Star Theater with Milton Berle. Each 30-minute episode was hosted by Bob Pfeiffer, who was also the announcer for some episodes of Captain Video.

The series consisted of Pfeiffer and others interviewing disabled war veterans and then asking viewers to come forward with job offers. The program claimed to have found jobs for one-hundred-percent of the veterans. DuMont aired a similar series, Operation Information which outlined veteran benefits, from July 17 to September 18, 1952.

== Episode status ==
Two episodes are in the collection of the Paley Center for Media.

== See also ==
- List of programs broadcast by the DuMont Television Network
- List of surviving DuMont Television Network broadcasts
- 1948-49 United States network television schedule

== Bibliography ==
- David Weinstein, The Forgotten Network: DuMont and the Birth of American Television (Philadelphia: Temple University Press, 2004) ISBN 1-59213-245-6
