= The Pet Shop =

American television program (1951–1953)

- Presented by: Gail Compton; Gay Compton
- Country of origin: United States

Production
- Running time: 30 minutes

Original release
- Network: DuMont
- Release: December 1, 1951 – March 14, 1953

The Pet Shop is an American television program broadcast on the DuMont Television Network. The series ran from 1951 to 1953, and was a primetime series on pet care hosted by Gail Compton and his young daughter Gay.

The program, produced in Chicago and distributed by DuMont, aired on Saturdays at 7:30 pm ET on most DuMont affiliates. The series ran on the network from December 1, 1951 to March 14, 1953. DuMont replaced the series with local (non-network) programming.

== See also ==
- List of programs broadcast by the DuMont Television Network
- List of surviving DuMont Television Network broadcasts
- 1952-53 United States network television schedule

== Bibliography ==
- David Weinstein, The Forgotten Network: DuMont and the Birth of American Television (Philadelphia: Temple University Press, 2004) ISBN 1-59213-245-6
- Alex McNeil, Total Television, Fourth edition (New York: Penguin Books, 1980) ISBN 0-14-024916-8
- Tim Brooks and Earle Marsh, The Complete Directory to Prime Time Network and Cable TV Shows 1946–Present, Ninth edition (New York: Ballantine Books, 2007) ISBN 978-0-345-49773-4
