= The Strawhatters =

- Also known as: Summer in the Park
- Directed by: Frank Bunetta
- Starring: Bob Haymes, Bill Wendell (1952); Johnny Olson, (1953); Virginia Graham, (1954)
- Country of origin: United States

Production
- Producer: Roger Gerry
- Running time: 60 minutes with commercials

Original release
- Network: DuMont
- Release: May 27, 1953 – September 8, 1954

The Strawhatters is an American television summer variety show that aired on the national DuMont network in the 1950s.

== Broadcast history ==
The show aired on the DuMont network from May 27 to September 9, 1953, and again in 1954, from June 23 to September 8 of that year. Episodes of the program had also been seen on WABD, the New York City-area DuMont station, in 1952, before it aired nationally. For 1954, the program was retitled Summer in the Park.

Filmed at Palisades Amusement Park in New Jersey, across the Hudson River from New York City, The Strawhatters featured talent shows, musical entertainment, and diving exhibitions. The Complete Directory to Primetime Network and Cable TV Shows (8th edition, 2003) called The Strawhatters "essentially an hour-long advertisement for Palisades Amusement Park."

The program was hosted and emceed by Bob Haymes, followed by Bill Wendell in 1952, Johnny Olson in 1953, and Virginia Graham in 1954.

== See also ==
- List of programs broadcast by the DuMont Television Network
- List of surviving DuMont Television Network broadcasts

== Bibliography ==
- David Weinstein, The Forgotten Network: DuMont and the Birth of American Television (Philadelphia: Temple University Press, 2004) ISBN 1-59213-245-6
- Alex McNeil, Total Television, Fourth edition (New York: Penguin Books, 1980) ISBN 0-14-024916-8
- Tim Brooks and Earle Marsh, The Complete Directory to Prime Time Network TV Shows, Third edition (New York: Ballantine Books, 1985) ISBN 0-345-31864-1
