= The Power of Women =

- Directed by: Wesley Kenney
- Presented by: Vivien Kellems
- Country of origin: United States
- No. of episodes: 20

Production
- Producer: Duncan MacDonald
- Running time: 30 minutes

Original release
- Network: DuMont
- Release: July 1 – November 11, 1952

The Power of Women is an early American television program broadcast on the DuMont Television Network. The series ran from July to November of 1952. This thirty-minute-long series was a public affairs program originally hosted by Vivien Kellems. Kellems would leave partway through the series' run.

The program, produced and distributed by DuMont, aired Mondays at 8pm ET on most DuMont affiliates. The last episode was broadcast on November 11, 1952, replaced by popular quiz show Twenty Questions.

The Power of Women originated at WABD-TV in New York City and was sustaining. Duncan MacDonald was the producer, and Wesley Kenney was the director.

== See also ==
- List of programs broadcast by the DuMont Television Network
- List of surviving DuMont Television Network broadcasts
- 1952-53 United States network television schedule

== Bibliography ==
- David Weinstein, The Forgotten Network: DuMont and the Birth of American Television (Philadelphia: Temple University Press, 2004) ISBN 1-59213-245-6
- Tim Brooks and Earle Marsh, The Complete Directory to Prime Time Network TV Shows, Third edition (New York: Ballantine Books, 1964) ISBN 0-345-31864-1
