= Rebound (American TV series) =

- Also known as: Counterpoint
- Created by: Bernard Girard
- Country of origin: United States
- No. of episodes: 22

Production
- Producer: Bing Crosby Enterprises
- Running time: 24 minutes

Original release
- Network: ABC (1952); DuMont (1952-1953)
- Release: February 8, 1952 – January 16, 1953

Rebound is an anthology television series which aired on both the ABC and on the DuMont networks. Featuring dramatic stories with unusual endings, the series ran from February 8, 1952, to May 30, 1952, on ABC (17 episodes) and from November 21, 1952, to January 16, 1953, on DuMont (5 episodes).

The ABC series aired Fridays from 9 to 9:30pm ET. The DuMont series aired Fridays from 8:30 to 9pm ET, alternating weekly with Dark of Night. Among the actors appearing were Onslow Stevens, Lee Marvin, John Doucette, and Rita Johnson.

The show was the TV debut of Lee Marvin. The series was known as Counterpoint in syndication from 1955 to 1956.

== Production ==
The show was produced on film by Bing Crosby Enterprises, with Basil Grillo as executive producer and Harve Foster as general manager. Bernard Girard was the producer and director. It originated from WABD-TV.

== Episodes ==
Episodes included "Dry, with Three Olives", starring Hans Conried, on November 14, 1952. One episode is listed on the website TV4U. Two episodes are held in the J. Fred MacDonald collection at the Library of Congress. Episodes are also held (under the Counterpoint title) by the UCLA Film and Television Archive.

- November 21, 1952 - "The Good Turn" - George Macready, Rita Johnson, Hayden Roarke, Jeanne Dean, Charles Watts

== See also ==
- List of programs broadcast by the DuMont Television Network
- List of surviving DuMont Television Network broadcasts

== Bibliography ==
- David Weinstein, The Forgotten Network: DuMont and the Birth of American Television (Philadelphia: Temple University Press, 2004) ISBN 1-59213-245-6
- Alex McNeil, Total Television, Fourth edition (New York: Penguin Books, 1980) ISBN 0-14-024916-8
- Tim Brooks and Earle Marsh, The Complete Directory to Prime Time Network and Cable TV Shows 1946–Present, Ninth edition (New York: Ballantine Books, 2007) ISBN 978-0-345-49773-4
