= Eye Witness (TV series) =

- Genre: Anthology
- Country of origin: United States
- No. of seasons: 1
- No. of episodes: 13

Production
- Executive producer: Robert Montgomery
- Running time: 30 minutes

Original release
- Network: NBC
- Release: March 30 – June 29, 1953

Eye Witness is a 30-minute American television anthology series that was broadcast live from New York City on the NBC television network beginning March 30, 1953, and ending June 29, 1953. Richard Carlson was the initial host, and Lee Bowman succeeded him. Robert Montgomery was the producer, and the series was produced by his company, Neptune Productions. Perry Lafferty was the director.

The show's stories dealt with characters involved in strange twists of fate and the supernatural. Each week, the guest host or hostess starred the following week on Montgomery's other NBC series, Robert Montgomery Presents.

Among its guest stars were Eva Marie Saint, John Newland, Nita Talbot, Melville Cooper, James Gregory, Fay Bainter and Emlyn Williams.

Eye Witness was on Monday nights from 9 to 9:30 Eastern Time. It replaced Hollywood Opening Night on NBC's schedule. Its competition included I Love Lucy and The Big Idea on Dumont. The sponsor was Ennds, a product of Pearson Pharmacal Company. Pearson, however, sought to withdraw sponsorship as a result of "the roasting the show got from most critics" following its premiere. By May 9, 1953, Ennds had ended its sponsorship, and NBC was offering a discounted approach to any sponsor willing to take the time slot with Eye Witness "or any one of several other shows" that NBC could provide. The proposal said that if the show received a Nielsen rating of 16 or lower, the sponsor would pay nothing for talent and production. An episode rated 16-20 would cost $2,352.94, and one rated 20-25 would cost $5,882.35. Ratings above 25 would increase proportionately.

Episodes included "The Cruel Clinic of Dr. Schmidt" on March 30, 1953, starring Mercer McLeod, Harry Townes, and Eric Dressler.

== Critical reception ==
Media critic John Crosby attributed NBC with "a surprising burst of initiative" in scheduling what the network described as an "'off beat' mystery" opposite I Love Lucy, rather than scheduling a similar kind of situation comedy. He added, however, that in one episode the presentation was so off beat and combined with "elaborate trickery" that "you never have seen or heard so much malarkey in your life." He concluded, "Eye Witness is a pretty bad show."

A review in the trade publication Broadcasting described the premiere episode as one with "the stock situation, typed characters, trite dialogue and obvious conclusion that you might find in a primer on how to write a TV script". It summarized the presentation as taking "the line of least resistance, which in this case led straight to mediocrity".
