= Operation Information =

American TV public affairs series

- Genre: Public affairs
- Country of origin: United States
- Original language: English
- No. of seasons: 1
- No. of episodes: 10

Production
- Running time: 30 minutes

Original release
- Network: DuMont
- Release: July 17 – September 18, 1952

Operation Information is a DuMont Television Network public affairs TV show giving veterans information on their rights and benefits. The show aired Thursdays from July 17, 1952, to September 18, 1952. DuMont had previously aired a similar series for veterans, Operation Success (1948–49), designed to help disabled veterans find jobs.

== Episode status ==
As with many DuMont series, no episodes are known to exist.

== See also ==
- List of programs broadcast by the DuMont Television Network
- List of surviving DuMont Television Network broadcasts

== Bibliography ==
- David Weinstein, The Forgotten Network: DuMont and the Birth of American Television (Philadelphia: Temple University Press, 2004) ISBN 1-59213-245-6
- Alex McNeil, Total Television, Fourth edition (New York: Penguin Books, 1980) ISBN 0-14-024916-8
- Tim Brooks and Earle Marsh, The Complete Directory to Prime Time Network and Cable TV Shows 1946–Present, Ninth edition (New York: Ballantine Books, 2007) ISBN 978-0-345-49773-4
