= Fear and Fancy =

US television series

Fear and Fancy is a 30-minute American science fiction television anthology series. Fifteen episodes aired on the American Broadcasting Company from May 13, 1953 to August 26, 1953.
