= Don't Spare the Horses =

1952 British TV comedy series

- Country of origin: United Kingdom

Original release
- Release: 1952

Don't Spare the Horses is a British television comedy series which aired on the BBC during 1952. It featured Jimmy James, Harry Secombe, Peter Sellers, and Spike Milligan. It aired live for three episodes. These live transmissions were not recorded, as the BBC very rarely telerecorded shows prior to the mid-1950s.
