= Willys Theatre Presenting Ben Hecht's Tales of the City =

American TV anthology series (1953)

Willys Theatre Presenting Ben Hecht's Tales of the City is an American half-hour television anthology series. Ben Hecht served as the series host. It was broadcast from June 25, 1953, to September 17, 1953, on CBS. Hecht (whose stories were the basis for all episodes) introduced and closed each episode off-screen. The city referred to in the title was New York City.

Among its guest stars were Madeleine Carroll, Janis Carter, Barry Nelson, Ann Rutherford, Gary Merrill, Charles Coburn, Laraine Day Wendell Corey, and Hume Cronyn.

== Production ==
The series was broadcast live from 8:30 to 9 pm Eastern Time on Thursdays, replacing Amos 'n' Andy. William Dozier was the producer, and Robert Stevens was the director. Hank Sylvern and his orchestra provided music. Also known as Tales of the City, the program alternated weeks with Four Star Playhouse.

Tales of the City was sponsored by the Willys automobile company. Willys was considering moving the show to Saturdays at 7 pm in the autumn of 1953, but Billboard reported that the series "did no tlive up to critical expectations", and Willys canceled it.

== Critical response ==
A review in the trade publication Billboard said, "There should be no question about the success of Tales of the City". Reviewer Leon Morse wrote that the series used a time-tested formula based on the "myth of the big heart of the city", in which people in need are helped. The review said that the June 25, 1953, episode met a human-interest need, "But it also was phony, contrived, and devoid of reality." Morse complimented the direction, production, and writing and described the actors as "outstanding".

Paul Cotton, writing in The Des Moines Register, said that same episode was written well, with dialogue that "was turgid in spots, but literate." He rated it "a little superior" when compared to other shows of the same summer, acknowledging that such a comment was a "modest compliment".

The trade publication Variety called the premiere episode "a honeyed cornball" and "a bit of incense burned in honor of the popular myth that New York has a heart." The review praised Merrill's performance for "projecting some life in a bloodless play", said that Rutherford "was saccharine to fit her lines", and observed that the other actors "never had a chance."
