= Trash or Treasure =

- Also known as: Treasure Hunt
- Starring: Sigmund Rothschild (host); Nelson Case
- Country of origin: United States

Production
- Running time: 30 minutes

Original release
- Network: DuMont
- Release: October 1, 1952 – September 27, 1953

Trash or Treasure, later known as Treasure Hunt, is an early American TV series which aired on the DuMont Television Network Thursdays at 9pm ET from October 1, 1952, to September 27, 1953. The show was hosted by Sigmund Rothschild and Nelson Case.

In the show, owners of collectible items would bring antiques to host Sigmund Rothschild, who would give an opinion on how much they were worth. Rothschild was a self-taught appraiser, who appraised antiques for many celebrities. The program's name was changed to Treasure Hunt in April 1953, according to McNeil (1996).

Rothschild also hosted the similar series What's It Worth? (1948–49 and 1952–53) on CBS Television.

Trash or Treasure originated at WABD-TV in New York City and was sustaining.

== Episode status ==
As with most DuMont Network programs, no episodes of Trash or Treasure are known to survive today.

== See also ==
- List of programs broadcast by the DuMont Television Network
- List of surviving DuMont Television Network broadcasts
- 1952-53 United States network television schedule

== Bibliography ==
- David Weinstein, The Forgotten Network: DuMont and the Birth of American Television (Philadelphia: Temple University Press, 2004) ISBN 1-59213-245-6
- Alex McNeil, Total Television, Fourth edition (New York: Penguin Books, 1980) ISBN 0-14-024916-8
- Tim Brooks and Earle Marsh, The Complete Directory to Prime Time Network TV Shows, Third edition (New York: Ballantine Books, 1964) ISBN 0-345-31864-1
