= Football Sidelines =

- Genre: Sports
- Starring: Harry Wismer
- Country of origin: United States
- Original language: English

Production
- Running time: 15 minutes

Original release
- Network: DuMont
- Release: October 6 – December 22, 1952

Football Sidelines is a TV sports program broadcast on the DuMont Television Network from October 6 to December 22, 1952 and hosted by Harry Wismer. The program was 15 minutes long, and aired on Mondays at 9:30pm ET, followed by Famous Fights From Madison Square Garden at 9:45pm.

== Episode status ==
As with most DuMont series, no episodes are known to exist.

== See also ==
- List of programs broadcast by the DuMont Television Network
- List of surviving DuMont Television Network broadcasts
- 1952-53 United States network television schedule

== Bibliography ==
- David Weinstein, The Forgotten Network: DuMont and the Birth of American Television (Philadelphia: Temple University Press, 2004) ISBN 1-59213-245-6
- Alex McNeil, Total Television, Fourth edition (New York: Penguin Books, 1980) ISBN 0-14-024916-8
- Tim Brooks and Earle Marsh, The Complete Directory to Prime Time Network and Cable TV Shows 1946–Present, Ninth edition (New York: Ballantine Books, 2007) ISBN 978-0-345-49773-4
