= Where Was I? (TV series) =

- Genre: Panel show
- Presented by: Dan Seymour; Ken Roberts; John Reed King
- Country of origin: United States
- Original language: English

Production
- Running time: 30 minutes

Original release
- Network: DuMont
- Release: September 2, 1952 – October 6, 1953

Where Was I? is an American panel show which aired on the DuMont Television Network Tuesdays at 9pm ET from September 2, 1952, to October 6, 1953.

The series consisted of panelists would have to guess a location by listening to clues and viewing photos. Hosts included Dan Seymour, Ken Roberts, and John Reed King, and panelists included Bill Cullen, Nancy Guild, Virginia Graham, and Skitch Henderson.

== Episode status ==
As with most DuMont series, no episodes are known to exist.

== See also ==
- List of programs broadcast by the DuMont Television Network
- List of surviving DuMont Television Network broadcasts
- 1952-53 United States network television schedule

== Bibliography ==
- David Weinstein, The Forgotten Network: DuMont and the Birth of American Television (Philadelphia: Temple University Press, 2004) ISBN 1-59213-245-6
- Alex McNeil, Total Television, Fourth edition (New York: Penguin Books, 1980) ISBN 0-14-024916-8
- Tim Brooks and Earle Marsh, The Complete Directory to Prime Time Network TV Shows, Third edition (New York: Ballantine Books, 1964) ISBN 0-345-31864-1
