= Cavalcade of Stars (TV series) =

American TV variety series (1949–1952)

Cavalcade of Stars is an American variety television series that was broadcast on the DuMont Television Network from June 4, 1949, until September 26, 1952. It was one of DuMont's longest-running programs. A 1951 review in The New York Times said the show "has proved the training ground for more than one new TV star". It was a major source of income for DuMont, combining with Captain Video and His Video Rangers to provide half of the network's revenue by 1951. Because of its limited budget, hosts who became popular on the show were lured away to host programs on other networks that paid higher salaries and had larger budgets for programs.

== Personnel ==
Jack Carter was the host from the premiere until February 1950. Jerry Lester replaced him and left in July 1950. Jackie Gleason replaced Lester and remained the host for the duration of the program except for the summers of 1951 and 1952, when Larry Storch hosted. Sammy Spear led the orchestra. Don Russell was the announcer. A few weeks after Storch became host, the program went off the air.

=== Difficulties ===
Cavalcade of Stars, like other DuMont programs, faced challenges because the network's potential viewership was limited. DuMont had affiliates in only a few cities in the eastern United States and therefore reached fewer viewers than competing TV networks. (In November 1950 Cavalcade was carried by 19 stations — 13 with live transmissions and six with kinescope recordings. A DuMont executive wrote in May 1952 that the number of stations carrying the program was determined by the sponsor "within very broad limits" and added that the 24 stations then carrying the program "represent 72.7 percent of the total U. S. television potential".) Fewer viewers meant smaller budgets, and as a result performers who achieved success on DuMont programs tended to depart for other networks that offered both higher salaries and wider exposure. Cavalcade lost the first three of its four hosts as a result of that situation. The show was also handicapped by being a latecomer to the variety format on TV. By the time it debuted, "there had been so many others like it already that Cavalcade of Stars was almost lost in the crowd".

=== Carter ===
Cavalcade of Stars brought Carter "from semi-obscurity to budding prominence in the public eye". He said that maintaining a certain pace was the key to success on TV, rather than trying to outdo himself from one show to the next. Versatility marked his activities from one episode to the next, and he chose to let guests be the stars of the show. Carter's last episode on the show was broadcast on February 11, 1950. The New York Times said that Carter departed "reportedly because of a contract dispute with the sponsors." He went to NBC to host a variety show that immediately preceded Your Show of Shows, which was then that network's main attraction.

=== Lester ===
Lester became the host on March 4, 1950. After a few months Lester went to NBC to be the host on Broadway Open House, the first late-night program on TV. Cavalcade's producer sought Peter Donald, a radio personality, as Lester's replacement, but Donald declined, saying that he was not suited to the fast pace of comedy and variety on TV.

=== Gleason ===
Gleason was initially offered a two-week contract, but negotiations extended the duration to four weeks, while the producer hoped "to find someone better" during that time. Gleason was paid $3,000 for those four weeks. That amount was less than he could have made in a nightclub engagement that he turned down for the same period, but he liked the opportunity that TV exposure provided. He began as host of the show on July 8, 1950. A review in The New York Times in 1951 noted that on the show Gleason worked more with pantomime and characterizations than being one of the numerous "wisecracking ad libbers". The characters that he developed on Cavalcade included The Poor Soul, Joe the Bartender, Reginald Van Gleason III, Charlie Bratton, and Ralph Kramden. Midway through 1952, CBS offered Gleason a salary five times what he received from DuMont, and he took the offer, with his weekly pay increasing from $1,600 to $8,000. Early in Gleason's tenure on the show he added choreographer June Taylor to the show's staff with the belief that "a bunch of scantily clad beauties can keep even a mediocre show going strong". Taylor hired six female dancers, with the troupe's number limited by both the size of the stage and the size of the budget. Art Carney was an early addition to the show, first signed to appear on Gleason's second episode as a foil for the star.

== Guest performers ==
Guest artists who performed on the show included

- Jean Carroll
- Walter Cassel
- Rosemary Clooney
- Bob Crosby
- The DeMarco Sisters
- Johnny Desmond
- Joan Edwards
- Igor Gorin
- Woody Herman
- Lois Hunt
- Kitty Kallen
- Pinky Lee
- Liberace
- Peter Lorre
- Rose Marie
- Chico Marx
- Ilona Massey
- Joan Merrill
- Lanny Ross
- Smith and Dale
- Mel Tormé
- Vera Vague
- June Valli
- Bert Wheeler

== "The Honeymooners" ==
The situation comedy The Honeymooners originated as a sketch on Cavalcade of Stars. Harry Crane and Joe Bigelow were writers for the show when Gleason asked them to create a sketch in which he would portray "a working-class guy from Brooklyn with a beleaguered wife". The result of their collaboration was "The Honeymooners". The skits, which were set in the same area of Brooklyn where Gleason was raised, "were a one-of-a-kind blend of truth, poignancy and humor". Pert Kelton portrayed Alice Kramden opposite Gleason's Ralph Kramden, and Art Carney found a new kind of role for himself. The first "Honeymooners" sketch (lasting six minutes) was broadcast on October 5, 1951. Russell introduced the sketch to the audience, saying: ""You know, friends, that great institution, the honeymoon, is the time when the ship of life is launched on the sea of matrimony. Well, tonight Jackie Gleason introduces two brand-new characters, Ralph and Alice Kramden — the Honeymooners — whose boat has sprung a leak." Carney appeared in the first sketch as a cop, becoming neighbor Ed Norton several episodes later.

== Production ==
Producer Milton Douglas frequently attended stage shows and nightclubs in addition to watching other television programs, all in search of new talent that might appear on Cavalcade of Stars. Those searches supplemented work by two talent agencies. The goal for each episode was to sign one or two featured acts and then obtain other performers to fill out the hour. Frank Bunetta was the director. Snag Werris and Stanley Shapiro were the writers in the show's early years. Later, writers were divided into two teams: Bigelow and Crane worked together, as did Coleman Jacoby and Arnie Rosen.

Originating from WABD, Cavalcade of Stars initially was broadcast on Saturdays from 9 to 10 p.m. Eastern Time Audiences for the show "disproved the conventional wisdom that people wouldn't stay home on Saturday nights to watch television". Enough people watched the show that NBC decided to compete with extravagant Saturday evening programming of its own. It hired Carter to host his own show from 8 to 9 p.m. E. T. on Saturdays, followed by Your Show of Shows from 9 to 10:30 p.m. E. T. With the umbrella title NBC Saturday Night Revue, that combination debuted in February 1950. Prior to that development, Cavalcade's competition on NBC had been Eddie Condon's Floor Show, and The Ed Wynn Show, while ABC had Paul Whiteman's TV Teen Club and CBS showed films. In September 1950 Cavalcade was moved to Fridays from 10 to 11 p.m. ET.

The sponsor was Whelan Drug Stores. In addition to commercials for the chain, three cut-ins during each episode enabled each station to identify the local drug chain sponsor. The program was broadcast live from the Adelphi Theater in New York City, which had been converted from a legitimate theater into a facility for TV productions. In 1950, the show's budget was $9,000 per week.

By the end of the show's first season, reports about a possible change of networks were circulating. The sponsor renewed it for the summer of 1950 while the program's network for that fall remained uncertain. The sponsor considered the renewal a safe move because NBC Saturday Night Revue went on hiatus for the summer, a move that was likely to increase Cavalcade's summer audience. The trade publication Billboard reported in June 1950, "ABC is known to be pitching for the Cavalcade business, with the 10 p.m. time Friday said to be the period offered." In late 1950, the sponsor renewed its contract with DuMont, contrary to expectations that the show would be moving to ABC-TV. A move to ABC remained a possibility for April 1951 if that network could clear appropriate time on its affiliates.

== Critical response ==
A review of Cavalcade of Stars in The New York Times in June 1949 said, "That it contains a considerable degree of entertainment cannot be disputed, but that much of the entertainment is very familiar is perhaps even more to the point." The review noted that acts seen on that show had appeared on other TV programs, with the result that they "no longer hold much novelty or surprise". Critic Jack Gould went on to question whether variety shows might soon lose their popularity on TV. He offered a more positive perspective with regard to Joan Edwards's performance on the show, noting that she "proved a vigorous comedienne of very engaging talents" in addition to her established status as a singer. The review concluded with the observation that Jack Carter "still needs material rather desperately and should try working at a less frantic pace".

One year after Cavalcade of Stars debuted, syndicated columnist Jack O'Brian wrote that the show's popularity had surprised many people because prior to the premiere, the consensus was that most people did not stay at home on Saturday nights to watch TV. He acknowledged that Your Show of Shows had a larger audience but added, "[T]he DuMont show gets more than its expected share of selective listeners, a loyal clan indeed."

The trade publication Ross Reports on Television Programming called the launch of the show "a sound move in television programming", noting that it "has drawn consistently high ratings" through the summer of 1949.
