= Hollywood Opening Night =

American TV anthology series (1951–1953)

Hollywood Opening Night is an American anthology television program that was broadcast on CBS in 1951-1952 and on NBC in 1952-1953. The NBC version was the first dramatic anthology presented live from the West Coast. Episodes were 30 minutes long.

== CBS version ==
The CBS version debuted in July 1951, and ended in March 1952. Until March 1, 1952, it was sponsored by Ennds chlorophyll tablets, manufactured by Pearson Pharmacal Company, that product's first venture into being a regular sponsor on TV. Episodes were reruns of stories produced by Music Corporation of America, originally shown on Stars Over Hollywood.

== NBC version ==
On NBC Hollywood Opening Night ran from October 6, 1952, until March 23, 1953. It replaced Lights Out and was replaced by Eye Witness. Besides the change in networks, the content changed from filmed episodes to live broadcasts, and the show began originating from the then-new Burbank studios of NBC. Host Jimmie Fidler introduced each episode from a set that resembled a theater, and he followed each episode with a preview of what was scheduled for the next week. Ethel Barrymore, Dorothy Lamour, and Gloria Swanson made their TV dramatic debuts on the program.

Competing shows on other networks included The Big Idea on DuMont, Perspective on ABC, and I Love Lucy on CBS. Pearson again was the sponsor. Fidler blamed the show's demise on its being broadcast at the same time as I Love Lucy, the top-rated TV program at that time. He wrote that he had often asked executives at NBC about moving the show to another night, but they kept it in the same time slot.

William Corrigan was the program's producer and director, with Marilyn Evans as associate director. Boris Sagal was the story editor, and Fred Albeck was the musical director.

=== Reception ===
Columnist Jack Gould of The New York Times wrote that the premiere episode on NBC "was alleged to be a comic treatise on a baseball umpire". He compared one scene to "the Three Stooges of vaudeville" and noted that star William Bendix frequently was seen looking for a prompter to help with his lines.

Syndicated columnist John Crosby considered the fact that the program was performed before a live audience to be a disadvantage. He noted the overacting of the performers ("all pretty frantic") in the episode that he reviewed, attributing it to the actors' performing more for the in-house audience than for people who were watching on TV. He summarized Hollywood Opening Night as "a pleasant, well-lit, well-upholstered vacuum of a show which should kill a half hour of your time as painlessly as possible."

== Episodes ==
Partial List of Episodes of Hollywood Opening Night
Date	Title	Star(s)
October 6, 1951	"Old Mother Hubbard"	Ellen Corby
November 24, 1951	"Landing at Daybreak"	Anita Louise
October 6, 1952	"The Terrible Tempered Tolliver"	Bendix
October 13, 1952	"Let Georgie Do It"	Ann Sothern, Richard Egan
October 27, 1952	"Somebody I Know"	Peggy Ann Garner, Natalie Wood, Ann Harding, James Dunn
November 3, 1952	"Welcome Home, Stranger"	Teresa Wright, Mark Stevens
November 10, 1952	"Thirty Days"	Edward Arnold, Robert Stack
November 17, 1952	"Hope Chest"	MacDonald Carey, Joan Caulfield
November 24, 1952	"The Singing Years"	Lamour
December 8, 1952	"Mysterious Ways"	Barrymore
December 29, 1952	"The Priceless Gift"	Ronald Reagan
February 9, 1953	"False Witness"	Virginia Field
February 16, 1953	"The Pattern"	Swanson
March 2, 1953	"The Invited Seven"	Boris Karloff
March 9, 1953	"The Romantic Type"	June Havoc
March 15, 1953	"Uncle Fred Flits By"	David Niven
