= Virginia Graham =

American talk-show host (1912–1998)

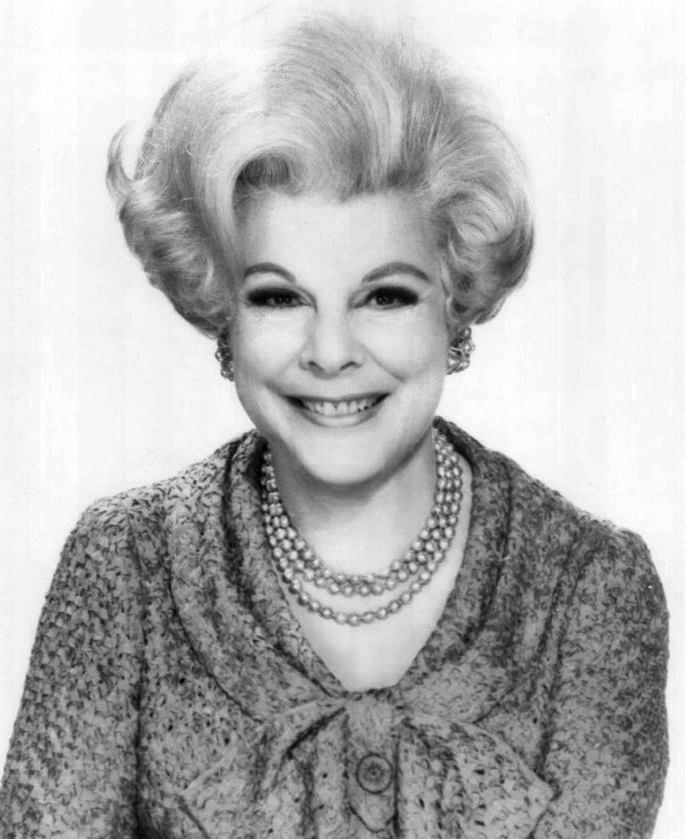
- Graham in 1972
- Born: Virginia Komiss; July 4, 1912; Chicago, Illinois, U.S.
- Died: December 22, 1998 (aged 86); New York City, U.S.
- Occupation: Talk show host
- Years active: 1951–1998

Virginia Graham (born Virginia Komiss; July 4, 1912 – December 22, 1998) was an American daytime television talk show host from the mid-1950s to the mid-1970s. On television, Graham hosted the syndicated programs Food for Thought (1953–1957), Girl Talk (1963–1969) and The Virginia Graham Show (1970–1972). She was also a guest on many other programs.

== Biography ==
=== Early life and education ===
Graham was born and raised in Chicago. Her father, a Jewish immigrant from Germany, became a successful businessman who owned the Komiss department-store chain. She graduated from the private Francis Parker School in Chicago, and in 1931, received her degree from the University of Chicago, where she had studied anthropology. She later earned a master's degree in journalism from Northwestern University.

=== Marriage ===
In 1935, Graham married Harry William Guttenberg, who owned a theatrical costume company. They remained married until his death in 1980. The couple had one daughter, Lynn Guttenberg Bohrer. Graham's book about her husband's death, Life After Harry: My Adventures in Widowhood, became a bestseller in 1988.

=== Career ===
After World War II, Graham wrote scripts for radio soap operas such as Stella Dallas, Our Gal Sunday and Backstage Wife. She hosted her first radio talk show in 1951. Graham was a panelist on the DuMont panel show Where Was I? (1952–53). She succeeded Margaret Truman in 1956 as cohost of the NBC radio show Weekday, teamed with Mike Wallace.

She played "Mrs.Walter" in The Love Boat S2 E16 storyline "Second Chance" which aired 1/26/1979. In 1982, Graham played fictional talk show host Stella Stanton in the final episodes of the soap opera Texas.

She was described by writer Howard Thompson in The New York Times as "a bright, alert, talkative woman of ripe, tart-edged candor." Another writer, Richard L. Coe, said she looked like "Sophie Tucker doing a Carol Channing performance."

Graham, a cancer survivor, was a fundraiser for the American Cancer Society. A former smoker, she denounced smoking, but when asked on her program what she would do if she knew that the world would end tomorrow, she confessed that she would smoke.

Graham died of a heart attack on December 22, 1998.

== Filmography ==
Year	Title	Role	Notes
1957	A Face in the Crowd	Herself	Uncredited
1964	The Carpetbaggers	Reporter	Uncredited
1977	A Secret Space	Grandma	
1982	Slapstick of Another Kind	Gossip Specialist	
1982	Hart To Hart	Morgana	
1986	The Perils of P.K.		

== Books ==
- There Goes What's Her Name: The Continuing Saga of Virginia Graham (with Jean Libman Block), 1965.
- Don't Blame the Mirror (with Jean Libman Block), 1967. Self-improvement, beauty advice.
- If I Made It, So Can You, 1978.
- Life After Harry: My Adventures in Widowhood, 1988.
- Look Who's Sleeping in My Bed!, 1993. Memoir.
