= Short Short Dramas =

American TV dramatic anthology series (1952–1953)

Short Short Dramas is an American dramatic anthology series which aired from September 30, 1952 to April 9, 1953 on NBC. During the original run it was hosted by Ruth Woods, whose segments were dropped when it was syndicated.

Each episode began with Woods introducing a storyteller. He or she set the scene for the episode's play and then took a starring role in it.

While most American anthology TV series of the 1950s aired weekly in either half-hour or hour-long time-slots, Short Short Dramas aired in a 15-minute time-slot, with episodes broadcast each week on Tuesday and Thursday from 7:15 to 7:30 p.m. Eastern Time. Episodes were 12-minutes excluding ads, and a total of 78 episodes were produced. Additionally, unlike most early anthology series which were live, Short Short Dramas was an early example of a filmed dramatic series, still a relatively new idea at the time (the first filmed dramatic TV series had aired in 1949, but they were only just starting to become more common in 1952).

Among its guest stars were Cliff Robertson, E.G. Marshall, Leslie Nielsen, Bethel Leslie, Tony Randall, Neva Patterson, Richard Kiley, and Ernest Borgnine, Directors included Daniel Petrie.

== Syndication ==
Although it only ran for one season, it nevertheless proved popular enough to have syndicated repeats under the title Playhouse 15. A 1955 trade ad lists MCA as being the distributor.

It was also exported to Australia. Starting in 1959 it aired in Sydney on ATN-7 and in Melbourne on GTV-9, as this was prior to the creation of the Nine Network and Seven Network.
