= Famous Fights from Madison Square Garden =

- Genre: Sports
- Country of origin: United States
- Original language: English

Production
- Producers: Leslie Winik, Winik Films
- Running time: 15 minutes

Original release
- Network: DuMont
- Release: September 15 – December 22, 1952

Famous Fights from Madison Square Garden is a TV sports series broadcast by the DuMont Television Network from September 15, 1952 to December 22, 1952. The program aired famous past boxing matches at Madison Square Garden in New York City. The program aired Monday nights at 9:45pm ET, was 15 minutes long, and was preceded by another 15-minute show Football Sidelines.

Jimmy Powers provided commentaries on the telecasts, which preceded bouts from Eastern Parkway Arena in Brooklyn. The program was sponsored by Adam Hats and originated at WABD.

== Syndication ==
In 1953, a revised version of Famous Fights from Madison Square Garden with "all new footage" was offered for syndication. It was produced by Winik Films, Incorporated, and distributed by Du Mont Film Syndication Department. In 1954, Winik took control of distribution of the series. Also in 1954, the series took second place in the sports division of Billboard magazine's Second Annual TV Film Awards.

== Episode status ==
As with most DuMont series, no episodes are known to exist.

== See also ==
- List of programs broadcast by the DuMont Television Network
- List of surviving DuMont Television Network broadcasts
- 1952-53 United States network television schedule

== Bibliography ==
- David Weinstein, The Forgotten Network: DuMont and the Birth of American Television (Philadelphia: Temple University Press, 2004) ISBN 1-59213-245-6
- Alex McNeil, Total Television, Fourth edition (New York: Penguin Books, 1980) ISBN 0-14-024916-8
- Tim Brooks and Earle Marsh, The Complete Directory to Prime Time Network TV Shows, Third edition (New York: Ballantine Books, 1964) ISBN 0-345-31864-1
