= Meet the Masters =

American classical music television program

Meet the Masters is a classical music television program aired in 1952 on NBC. The series debuted on February 24, 1952. The first episode featured violinist Jascha Heifetz. The series went on hiatus after the April 20, 1952, episode, and returned on October 19, 1952. Each episode was developed around "a simple story line woven into the half-hour to give it production appeal along with a pleasing touch of informality."

Jack Gould, columnist for The New York Times, reviewed the initial broadcast with mixed feelings. He complimented Heifetz's playing "with all his accustomed brilliance" but felt that the program devoted too much time to Heifetz's answering "a series of questions leading to the standard bromidic gags" from a group of students.

In addition to Heifetz, performers featured on the program in the spring of 1952 included Marian Anderson (March 9), Arthur Rubinstein (March 23), The Trio (April 6), and Andres Segovia, Jan Peerce, and Nadine Conner (April 20). The fall of 1952 had repeats of spring episodes plus a show that featured Gregor Piatigorsky (November 16).

The program was sponsored by James Lee & Sons Co., which manufactured carpets, rungs and knitting yarn.

In 1953, episodes were distributed by Standard TV via syndication under the title Music by the Masters.

The series was purchased by Major Television Productions and enjoyed a second syndicated run in the 1960s under the title World Artists Concert Hall.
