= Report Card for Parents =

- Genre: Panel show
- Country of origin: United States
- Original language: English
- No. of seasons: 1
- No. of episodes: 10

Production
- Running time: 30 minutes

Original release
- Network: DuMont
- Release: December 1, 1952 – February 2, 1953

Report Card for Parents is a half-hour DuMont Television Network panel discussion show on child behavior which aired Mondays at 8:00 pm ET from December 1, 1952, to February 2, 1953.

The show discussed the concerns of raising children.

== Episode status ==
As with many DuMont series, no episodes are known to exist.

== See also ==
- List of programs broadcast by the DuMont Television Network
- List of surviving DuMont Television Network broadcasts

== Bibliography ==
- David Weinstein, The Forgotten Network: DuMont and the Birth of American Television (Philadelphia: Temple University Press, 2004) ISBN 1-59213-245-6
- Alex McNeil, Total Television, Fourth edition (New York: Penguin Books, 1980) ISBN 0-14-024916-8
- Tim Brooks and Earle Marsh, The Complete Directory to Prime Time Network and Cable TV Shows 1946–Present, Ninth edition (New York: Ballantine Books, 2007) ISBN 978-0-345-49773-4
