= Dark of Night =

- Genre: Anthology
- Starring: Shirley Jones; Alan Hale, Jr.
- Country of origin: United States
- Original language: English

Production
- Producer: Frank Bunetta
- Camera setup: Single-camera
- Running time: 25 minutes

Original release
- Network: DuMont
- Release: October 3, 1952 – May 1, 1953

Dark of Night is an American dramatic anthology series that aired on the DuMont Television Network on Fridays at 8:30pm EST from October 3, 1952, to May 1, 1953.

The series starred mostly unknown actors. In it, the character known as "The Stranger" traveled to a different site each week in order to solve a crime. Each episode was filmed at a different location in the New York City area. Locations included a Coca-Cola bottling plant, Brentano's book store in Manhattan, a castle in New Jersey, and the American Red Cross Blood Bank. Dark of Night was one of the first network dramas to use such locations, which saved money for the network.

Actors who performed on the program included Joel Ashley, Raymond Bailey, Martin Balsam, Patricia Barry, Wolfe Barzell, Ray Boyle, Frank Campanella, Flora Campbell, Hal Cooper, Joe Downing, Bramwell Fletcher, Scott Forbes, Joey Forman, Joy Geffen, Lauren Gilbert, Bruce Gordon, Leo Gordon, Sally Gracie, Allan Hale, Peg Hillias, Betty Lou Holland, Joseph Holland, Arch Johnson, Bernard Kates, Brian Keith (as Robert Keith Jr.), Jack Klugman, Doreen Lang, Will Lee, Paul Lipson, George Lowther, Jock MacGregor, Jack Manning, Bill McCutcheon, Mercer McLeod, Robert Middleton, Dick Moore, Lois Nettleton, Allen Nourse, Vince O'Brien, Judson Pratt, Logan Ramsey, Hal Riddle, Norman Rose, P. Jay Sidney, Art Smith, John Stanley, Rod Steiger, Harold Stone, Michael Strong, Grant Sullivan, Victor Thorley, Harry Townes, Peter Turgeon, Richard Ward, and Ruth White.

When the program was canceled, the trade publication Variety reported that it "had good critical reaction but no sponsor interest".

== Production ==
Dark of Night was broadcast live. Frank Bunetta was the producer and director. Preparation for each episode began with selection of the set to be used. Then a writer was chosen to write a script suited to the set, after which actors were chosen for the cast.

== Episode status ==
Though most episodes of DuMont series were eventually destroyed, the UCLA Film and Television Archive has one episode of Dark of Night, from January 30, 1953.

== See also ==
- List of programs broadcast by the DuMont Television Network
- List of surviving DuMont Television Network broadcasts
- 1952-53 United States network television schedule
- at CVTA with episode list
