= What's Your Bid? =

- Genre: Game show
- Presented by: Leonard Rosen (ABC); Robert Alda (DuMont)
- Starring: Berni Gould (ABC cast member); Roslyn Woods (model)
- Announcer: John Reed King (ABC); Dick Shepard (DuMont)
- Country of origin: United States
- Original language: English
- No. of seasons: 1
- No. of episodes: 11 (ABC); 9 (DuMont)

Production
- Running time: 30 minutes

Original release
- Network: ABC (Feb-Apr 1953); DuMont (May–June 1953)
- Release: February 14 – June 28, 1953

What's Your Bid? is an ABC and DuMont Television Network game show hosted by Leonard Rosen (as "Liberal Bill") (ABC) and Robert Alda (DuMont), with announcement and live commercials delivered by John Reed King (ABC) and Dick Shepard (DuMont). The show aired Saturdays from February 14, 1953, to late April on ABC, and Sundays from May 3, 1953, to June 28, 1953, on DuMont. The show was an auction where audience members bid on items, with all revenues from the auction directed to a specific charity that week, and often matching funds provided to that charity or another organization on behalf of the show's sponsor, Charles Antell Cosmetics. Winners would receive other prizes along with their auction items, ranging from consumer products to household appliances to cars, and Charles Antell products were frequent consolation prizes. In the middle segment, three pre-selected viewers would be telephoned, and given an opportunity to bid on an item, with the show's announcers manning the phones to deliver their bids to the host. In the final segment, a celebrity guest, such as Ralph Bellamy or Eva Gabor, would appear to speak on behalf of that week's charity organization, and auction off what was claimed to be a personal belonging of theirs.

== Episode status ==
In August 2019, an ABC episode was posted onto YouTube. The status of the rest of the episodes from both DuMont and ABC is unknown, though it is possible that most DuMont episodes were lost.

== See also ==
- List of programs broadcast by the DuMont Television Network
- List of surviving DuMont Television Network broadcasts

== Bibliography ==
- David Weinstein, The Forgotten Network: DuMont and the Birth of American Television (Philadelphia: Temple University Press, 2004) ISBN 1-59213-245-6
- Alex McNeil, Total Television, Fourth edition (New York: Penguin Books, 1980) ISBN 0-14-024916-8
- Tim Brooks and Earle Marsh, The Complete Directory to Prime Time Network TV Shows, Third edition (New York: Ballantine Books, 1964) ISBN 0-345-31864-1
