= Guess What (American game show) =

- Starring: Richard Kollmar (host); Audrey Christie; Mark Hanna; Virginia Peine; Quentin Reynolds
- Country of origin: United States

Production
- Running time: 30 minutes

Original release
- Network: DuMont
- Release: July 8 – August 26, 1952

Guess What? is an American game show broadcast on the now-defunct DuMont Television Network in 1952.

== Broadcast history ==
Guess What? aired from July 8, 1952, to August 26, 1952. The show was hosted by Richard Kollmar (1910-1971), husband of columnist Dorothy Kilgallen from 1940 to her death in 1965, and featured guest stars such as Mark Hanna, Audrey Christie, and Quentin Reynolds. Kollmar and Kilgallen also co-hosted the WOR-AM morning radio show Breakfast With Dorothy and Dick from 1945 to 1963.

== Episode status ==
As with most DuMont network series, no episodes are known to exist. In an era when most game shows were owned by their sponsors instead of by networks that broadcast them, such might have been the case with Guess What. The decision to cancel the series after a short run could have been made by a sponsor, and the decision to avoid saving kinescopes could have been, too. But the show's sponsor cannot be determined because not a single kinescope can be viewed, therefore nobody has been motivated to look for paper documents related to the series.

== See also ==
- List of programs broadcast by the DuMont Television Network
- List of surviving DuMont Television Network broadcasts

== Bibliography ==
- David Weinstein, The Forgotten Network: DuMont and the Birth of American Television (Philadelphia: Temple University Press, 2004) ISBN 1-59213-245-6
- Alex McNeil, Total Television, Fourth edition (New York: Penguin Books, 1980) ISBN 0-14-024916-8
- Tim Brooks and Earle Marsh, The Complete Directory to Prime Time Network and Cable TV Shows 1946–Present, Ninth edition (New York: Ballantine Books, 2007) ISBN 978-0-345-49773-4
