= Battle of the Ages =

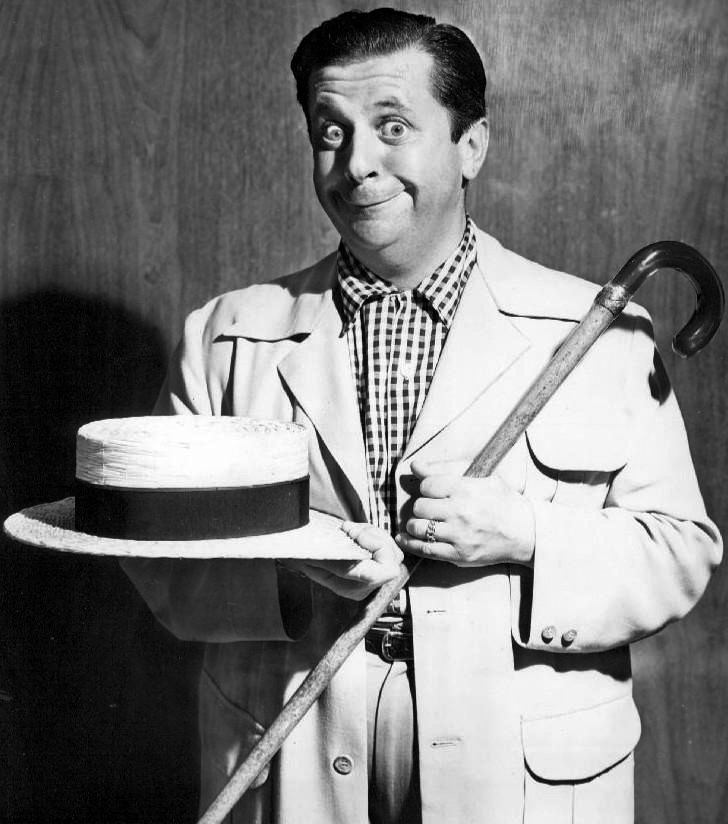
- Morey Amsterdam as host of the CBS series (1952)
- Presented by: John Reed King (DuMont); Morey Amsterdam (CBS)
- Narrated by: Norman Brokenshire; Arthur Van Horn
- Country of origin: United States

Production
- Running time: 30 Minutes

Original release
- Network: DuMont (January–July 1952); CBS (September–November 1952)
- Release: January 1 – November 29, 1952

Battle of the Ages is an American television program originally broadcast on the DuMont Television Network and later CBS.

== DuMont version ==
It was a prime time game show/talent contest which pitted children against adult celebrities. Whichever team won would have their winnings donated to either the Professional Children's School (the kids) or the Actors' Fund of America (the adults). The DuMont version ran from January 1 to July 17, 1952, and was hosted by John Reed King.

Competitors included The Charioteers and Henny Youngman.

== CBS version ==
The series was then aired by CBS on Saturdays at 10:30pm ET beginning on September 6, 1952. The age division for team members was 35, and it was hosted by Morey Amsterdam. Members of the two teams participated in "song, dance, comedy and instrumental competition", with the winning team determined by applause of the audience. It ended on November 29, 1952.

This version originated live at WCBS-TV with Serutan as the sponsor. Norman S. Livingston was the producer, Andrew McCullough was the director, and Milton DeLugg directed the music.

Competitors included Maxine Sullivan and W. C. Handy.

== See also ==
- List of programs broadcast by the DuMont Television Network
- List of surviving DuMont Television Network broadcasts
- 1952-1953 United States network television schedule

== Bibliography ==
- David Weinstein, The Forgotten Network: DuMont and the Birth of American Television (Philadelphia: Temple University Press, 2004) ISBN 1-59213-245-6
