= This Is the Life (TV series) =

- Also known as: The Fisher Family
- Genre: Drama

Production
- Production company: Lutheran Church – Missouri Synod

Original release
- Network: DuMont Television Network syndication
- Release: September 1952 – 1988

This Is the Life is an American Christian television dramatic series. This anthology series aired in syndication from 1952 to 1988. The series was originally produced by the Lutheran Church – Missouri Synod, and distributed by the Lutheran Laymen's League.

== Format ==
This Is the Life used two formats for its 36-year run. However, the main core of the series remained the same: presenting everyday and contemporary problems, and resolving them using a Christian solution. Even during the 1950s, topics often were controversial: censorship, morality, bigotry and racism, infidelity, juvenile delinquency, war (including the Vietnam War), and drug abuse. Some stories were light comedy, although most were serious.

=== 1952–1956: This Is the Life (The Fisher Family) ===
The series featured The Fisher Family, and premiered on the DuMont Television Network on September 9, 1952, and aired on both DuMont and ABC until the fall of 1953. The show entered syndication shortly after its network run ended.

The show's stories revolved around the Fishers, a typical family from Middleburg in an unnamed state of the Midwestern United States. The family included Carl, the father, who was a pharmacist; Anna, the mother (though they were referred to only as Mr. and Mrs. Fisher); their children Emily (18), Pete (16), and Freddie (10); and Grandpa Fisher (presumably Mr. Fisher's widower father), who lived with them. A recurring character was Pastor Martin, who presided over the Lutheran church where the Fishers were members.

Each episode presented a difficult life issue for one or more of the Fishers (or sometimes, the people they encountered); the issue's resolution was found through their Christian faith. Pastor Martin would facilitate this resolving process when the family (or other central character for that particular episode) was unable to do so among themselves. Christian faith as the basis of a strong, functional family was the theme tying the episodes together.

The show came to an end in the spring of 1956 and evolved into the spinoff anthology series also titled This Is the Life.

=== 1956–1988: This Is the Life ===
Replacing The Fisher Family focus in the fall of 1956, This Is the Life spun off from the former by means of Pastor Martin, who now became the only regular character on the show. The Fishers no longer appeared, but rather a variety of parishioners and other residents of or visitors to Middleburg. The series thus became, in terms of principal characters, an anthology; Christian practice and faith as the means of resolving each episodes principal(s) remained the underlying theme of the series, but by expanding the focus to different characters, a range of problems apart from just those facing a single, Christian nuclear family could be explored, e.g.:

- A businessman must help his drug-addicted sister, but only after he faces his own drug habit.
- A young girl runs away after learning her family is moving to another town because her father accepted a job transfer.
- A college student struggles with grief after losing his girlfriend in a car accident.
- An ex-con trying to reintegrate into the work force sees a question on his job application he has difficulty being honest about.

The characters were not necessarily Lutheran, devout Christians, or even Christians at all. They would ultimately be able to face their difficulties, however, by either turning or returning to Christianity, here in the form of Pastor Martin. Generally, the episode was introduced by Pastor Martin, telling the story of a past event to illustrate a point of doctrine. Generally, he thereafter did not appear in the episode until the crisis came to a head, usually as a consultant turned to by each episode's characters when they had exhausted their own and other "secular" resources.

When Nelson Leigh, who had played that role from The Fisher Family days, retired, other Lutheran ministers replaced him and the minister's role as "host" of the program was dropped. The show continued until 1988, though generally broadcast in its last years mostly on local or cable Christian networks, and videotaped rather than filmed. The move away from a single, central character, even if only briefly seen, along with the rise in televangelism bringing competing shows to the air, and individual religious networks where the lectures of individual personalities were promoted instead of the broad lessons via a teleplay for all of the past, may have contributed to the series' loss of audience.

At some point in its later years, some of the episodes were repackaged and reissued with a different title, Patterns For Living. At times, the editing for doing so was somewhat sloppy, such that the This Is the Life title was still evident.

About 100 episodes have been posted to YouTube since 2018. In addition, episodes of the program have been broadcast on television in the midwestern United States as part of the LCMS-endorsed program Main Street Living in recent years.

== Legacy ==
The success of This Is the Life resulted in several other Christian denominations producing their own religious anthology series. The most successful of these entries was Insight, which was produced by the Roman Catholic-affiliated Paulist Productions, premiering in syndication in 1960 and running for nearly 25 years.

Among less-successful anthologies were:

- This Is the Answer (1958–1961), underwritten by the Southern Baptist Convention.
- The Pastor (1955), the Methodists' entry into the market.

== Notable guest stars ==
Actors appearing in the series included:

- Julie Adams
- Judith Barsi
- Danielle Brisebois
- Paul Carr
- Gary Collins
- Kim Darby
- Joan Darling
- Henry Darrow
- Burr DeBenning
- Dean Devlin
- Angie Dickinson
- Conchata Ferrell
- Jonathan Frakes
- Peggy Ann Garner
- Kathy Garver
- Bonita Granville
- Clu Gulager
- Michael Hinn
- Dean Jagger
- Nelson Leigh
- Kay Lenz
- Dave Madden
- A Martinez
- Lee Meriwether
- Ed Nelson
- Jack Nicholson
- Leonard Nimoy
- Lisa Pelikan
- Nehemiah Persoff
- Brock Peters
- Mala Powers
- Annette O'Toole
- William Schallert
- David Ogden Stiers
- Lyle Talbot
- Glynn Turman
- Adam West
- Ian Wolfe
- Lynn Whitfield
- Alan Young

== Awards ==
1972: Nominated for a Primetime Emmy Award for Outstanding Achievement in Religious Programming - Programs.

1980: Won two Daytime Emmy Awards and was nominated for a third.

1983, 1984, 1985: Won the New York International Film and TV Festival Gold Medal Award for episodes, Bon Voyage and Shalom, Reprise for the Lord, and The Face of Gabriel Ortiz, all directed by Sharron Miller.

== Bibliography ==
- Brooks, Tim; Marsh, Earle (2007). The Complete Directory to Prime Time Network TV Shows (9th ed.). New York: Ballantine Books. ISBN 978-0-307-48320-1.
- Erickson, Hal (1989). Syndicated Television: The First Forty Years, 1947-1987. Jefferson, North Carolina: McFarland & Co. ISBN 0-89950-410-8.
- McNeil, Alex (1980). Total Television (4th ed.). Penguin Books. ISBN 0-14-024916-8.
- Sanders, Frederick B. (1961). A History of the Lutheran Television Production, 'This Is the Life,' from 1952–1958 (PhD dissertation). University of Michigan.
- Weinstein, David (2004). The Forgotten Network: DuMont and the Birth of American Television. Philadelphia: Temple University Press. ISBN 1-59213-245-6.

== See also ==
- List of programs broadcast by the DuMont Television Network
- List of surviving DuMont Television Network broadcasts
