= Operation Neptune (TV series) =

American TV series

Operation Neptune is an American science-fiction TV series that aired Sundays at 7:00 ET between June 28, 1953, and August 1953 on NBC Television. The show follows the adventures of a submarine captain named Commander Bill Hollister, otherwise known as 'Captain Neptune' as he battles undersea forces. The show was written by M. C. Brock (Maurice C. Brachhausen) and directed by Leonard Valenta. Operation Neptune is considered a kids' program, often compared to the more popular Captain Video.

NBC eventually replaced Operation Neptune with Assignment: Tomorrow.

== Overview ==
The show follows the adventures of Commander Bill Hollister, played by Tod Griffin, and his assistant Dink Saunders (Richard Holland) as they investigate the mysterious disappearances of Navy submarines. 30,000 feet under the sea, they discover a kingdom called Nadiria, led by the tyrannical Kebeda (Harold Conklin), who wants to wage war on humanity after an unpleasant experience on the surface.

The Nadirians are described as having elongated or curved eyebrows and wearing "25th century glad rags". They live in caves on the sea floor, eat food capsules, use atomic sunlight, and greet each other by "extending both arms forward and going through the motions of a breaststroke". Nadirians are technologically advanced, possessing fish-like submarines and control boards with view screens resembling televisions

Captain Neptune is assisted by a Nadirian woman named Thirza (Margaret Stewart), who is the leader of a Nadirian pacifist group.

== Production ==
The show was filmed using live performances enhanced by film inserts. The production team used soap bubbles and props to create the effect of being underwater.

== Critical response ==
Critics referred to Operation Neptune as "the crudest, most badly written and acted show on TV", and that "the filmed underwater effects, with what looks like two toy submarines cruising in an area no larger than an old wooden washtub, are unconvincing".

Other sources maintained that the show was "a bit of welcome hocus-pocus".
