= Quick on the Draw =

American TV game show (1952)

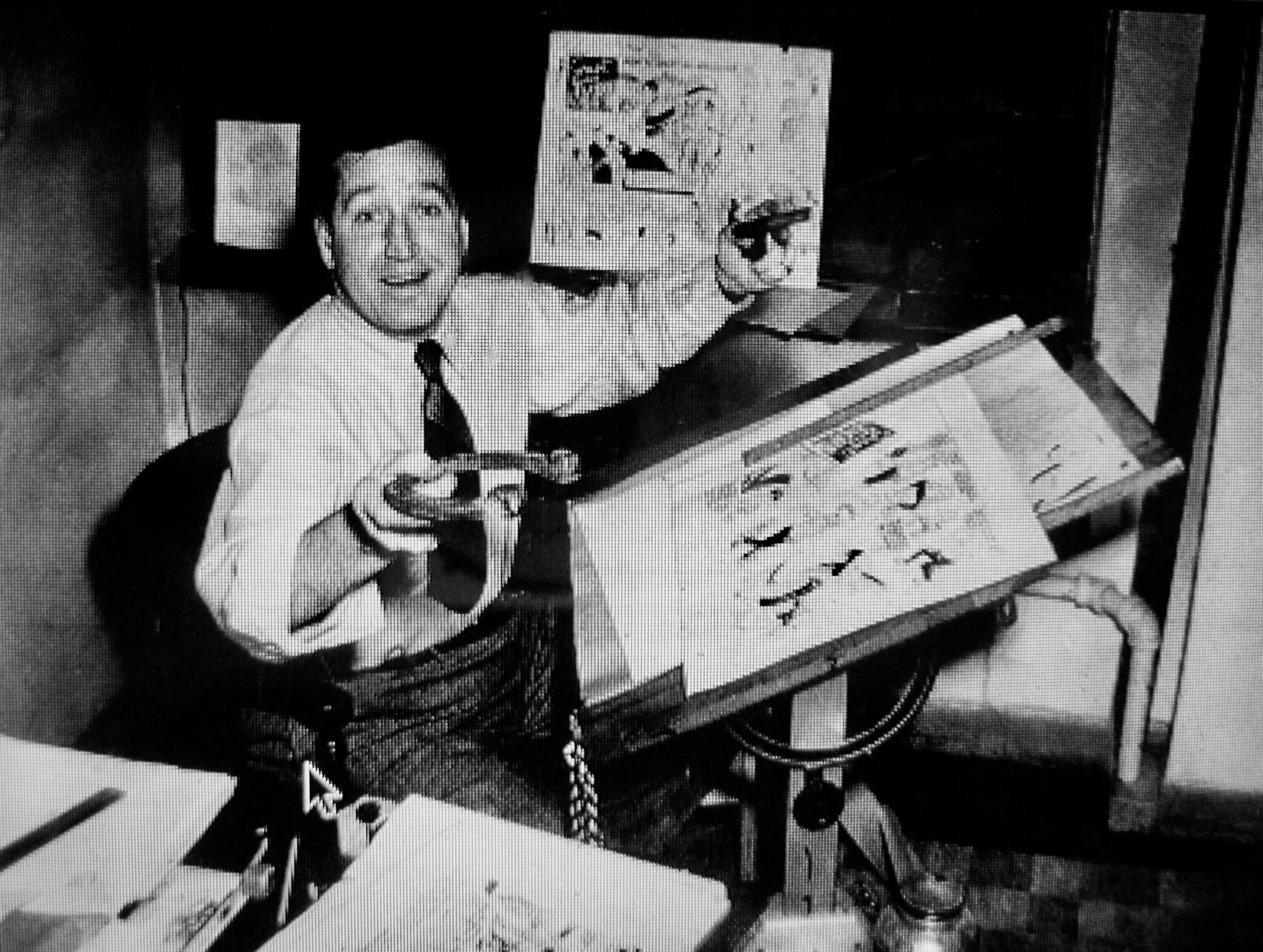
- Publicity shot
- Genre: Game show
- Directed by: Bill Warwick
- Presented by: Eloise McElhone; Robin Chandler
- Starring: Bob Dunn
- Country of origin: United States
- Original language: English

Production
- Camera setup: Multi-camera
- Running time: 24 minutes

Original release
- Network: DuMont
- Release: January 8 – December 9, 1952

Quick on the Draw is an American game show that aired on the DuMont Television Network between January 8 and December 9, 1952.

== Broadcast history ==
Quick on the Draw began in May 1950 as a local program in New York City, broadcast on WNBT on Saturdays at 10:30 p.m. Eastern Time. It was sponsored by the Vim Electric Company. Eloise McElhone was the mistress of ceremonies. Cartoonist Bob Dunn drew sketches, and a panel of four celebrities sought to decipher each sketch's meaning. The format was similar to the charades parlor game with drawings replacing miming.

The DuMont version of the show featured cartoonist Dunn, with Robin Chandler as hostess. The format was the same as that used on the local version. It was broadcast on Tuesdays from 9:30 to 10 p.m. ET.

== Episode status ==
As with most DuMont series, no episodes are known to exist.

== Critical response ==
Sam Chase, in a review of the WNBT version in the trade publication Billboard, wrote, "Basic trouble is the problems are too easily solved, with the panelists miles ahead of the last clues. Result is there is no element of suspense or surprise." However, he complimented McElhone's presence, explaining, "Miss McElhone is the only real strong point on the show. Lush to look at and quick of manner and speech, she is always an interesting and capable performer, and deserves a better showcase."

== See also ==
- List of programs broadcast by the DuMont Television Network
- List of surviving DuMont Television Network broadcasts
- 1952-53 United States network television schedule
- Face to Face (NBC, 1946–47, also featuring Bob Dunn)

== Bibliography ==
- David Weinstein, The Forgotten Network: DuMont and the Birth of American Television (Philadelphia: Temple University Press, 2004) ISBN 1-59213-245-6
