= The Red Buttons Show =

- Genre: Variety show Sitcom
- Created by: Marlo Lewis
- Developed by: CBS
- Directed by: Burt Shevelove
- Starring: Red Buttons
- Theme music composer: Elliot Lawrence
- Composer: Mitch Miller
- Country of origin: United States
- Original language: English
- No. of seasons: 3

Production
- Executive producer: Marlo Lewis
- Producer: Al Span
- Running time: 30 min.

Original release
- Network: CBS; NBC
- Release: October 14, 1952 – 1955

The Red Buttons Show is a variety show/sitcom, which premiered on the CBS television network on October 14, 1952, and ran for two years on that network, moving to NBC for the final 1954–55 season.

The series finished #11 for the 1952–1953 season in the Nielsen ratings and #12 in 1953–1954.

== Format ==
The CBS run of the series featured monologues, dance numbers, and sketches with Red and the other series regulars. The characters played by Red included the boxer Rocky Buttons, the Kupke Kid, the Sad Sack, and Keeglefarven. When the series was canceled by CBS, it moved to NBC which at first kept it as a variety show. When the ratings remained low, the program was overhauled and turned into a sitcom with Red playing himself as a TV comic. Phyllis Kirk played his wife, Bobby Sherwood played the director of Red's program and Paul Lynde played the network's vice president.

== CBS regulars ==
- Red Buttons
- Dorothy Jolliffe
- Pat Carroll
- Beverly Dennis
- Allan Walker
- Joe Silver
- Betty Ann Grave

== NBC regulars ==
- Red Buttons
- Phyllis Kirk
- Paul Lynde as Mr. Standish
- Bobby Sherwood
- Nelson Case, announcer

== Production ==
Bill Davenport and Johnny Green were writers for the NBC version. It was sponsored by Pontiac.
