= The Bill Goodwin Show =

American TV variety series (1951–1952)

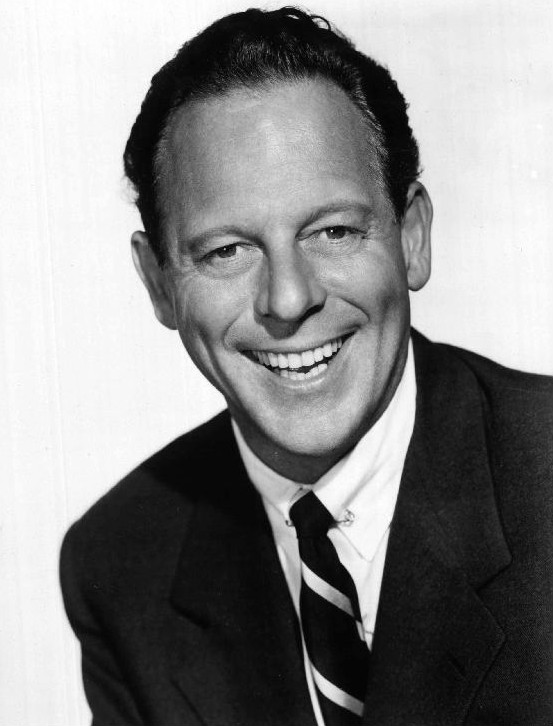
- Bill Goodwin (1951)
- Genre: Variety
- Written by: Bob E. Emerick
- Starring: Bill Goodwin
- Country of origin: United States
- Original language: English
- No. of seasons: 1

Production
- Producers: Louis Cowan; Sherman Marks

Original release
- Network: NBC
- Release: September 11, 1951 – March 27, 1952

The Bill Goodwin Show is a variety program that was broadcast on NBC television from September 11, 1951, to March 27, 1952.

== Schedule ==
The program was seen on Tuesday and Thursday afternoons, initially alternating days with The Bert Parks Show. When the Parks program moved to CBS, a program headed by Ralph Edwards replaced it on Mondays, Wednesdays and Fridays.

== Format ==
Sponsored by General Electric appliances, the program featured music, songs, guest and interviews. A reviewer for the trade publication Billboard found that the show's debut broadcast left much to be desired:

The new Bill Goodwin Show is described by NBC as "A variety-musical comedy-audience participation series with guest personalities." In a do-or-die attempt to live up to this ever-stuffed analysis of its content, the initial program fell flat on its format. . . Goodwin has a lot of charm and should click big in TV once NBC decides to let him be himself instead of Berle-Parks-and-O'Neill all rolled up into one impossible package.

== Personnel ==
Generally known as an announcer, Bill Goodwin left that role with The George Burns and Gracie Allen Show to become the host of his own daytime program. Eileen Barton and Roger Dann were vocalists, and the Joe Bushkin Trio provided instrumental music. Louis Cowan and Sherman Marks produced the show; Bob E. Emerick was a writer.
