= The Buick Circus Hour =

- Country of origin: United States
- Original language: English
- No. of seasons: 1

Original release
- Network: NBC
- Release: October 7, 1952 – 1953

The Buick Circus Hour is an American television series that aired October 7, 1952 - June 16, 1953, on NBC.

== Overview ==
It was a variety series with a circus theme. It was a 60-minute show. As the title suggests, it was sponsored by Buick. Archival status is not known, but the debut episode appears on the Internet Archive.

== Plot ==
Kim O'Neill was a young singer who is in love with Bill Sothern, owner of the circus in which she worked. An old clown tried to help O'Neill, whom he had adopted as an infant about two decades earlier. Episodes dealt with both personal and professional situations. Real circus acts and musical numbers were included in the stories.

== Cast ==
- Clown - Joe E. Brown
- Bill Sothern - John Raitt
- Kim O'Neill - Dolores Gray
- Ringmaster - Frank Gallop

Others who appeared on the program included Ben Blue and Edd Byrnes in his first TV job.

== Production ==
The producer of The Buick Circus Hour was John C. Wilson, and the director was Frank Burns. Writers included Nat Hiken, Anita Loos, and Jerry Seelen. Victor Young directed the music. This series aired once a month in the Tuesday night 8 PM Eastern time slot normally occupied by the Texaco Star Theater which starred Milton Berle. The series originated from WNBT in New York.

== Critical response ==
Peg Simpson wrote in The (Syracuse) Post-Standard that the program made "little impression on the public in its first show" but added that it "shows great promise". Simpson suggested that having stronger motivations for characters and better integrating stories and music would improve the show.

A reviewer for the Brooklyn Eagle newspaper felt the series was not up to 1952 standards (comparing the show with a 1948 variety show), though also describing the cast and crew as being talented.

John Crosby wrote that the show "was a sort of undigested mixture" of circus, musical comedy, and television without being any one of the three. Crosby wrote that after a circus-themed opening, the rest of the program "was more routine song and dance stuff".

A review of the premiere episode in the trade publication Variety said that the program showed promise and was exciting, but "too many diverse elements were tossed together". As a result, "the plot gets lost in the shuffle, with the drama telescoped into skeletonized, sketchy segments".
