= The Big Idea (American TV series) =

American TV documentary series (1952–1953)

- Presented by: Donn Bennett (host); Ray Wood (panelist)
- Country of origin: United States

Production
- Running time: 30 Minutes

Original release
- Network: DuMont
- Release: December 15, 1952 – October 22, 1953

The Big Idea is a documentary TV series that was broadcast on the DuMont Television Network. The 30-minute program, which ran from December 15, 1952, to October 22, 1953, focused on modern inventions.

== Overview ==
Donn Bennett, whose production company owned the show, was the host, and Ray Wood (director of the South Jersey Manufacturers Association) was a regular panelist on the show. Panelists interviewed inventors and commented on the products that they displayed on the show. Those products included an inflatable bathing suit for women, a lighted dartboard, a self-standing golf club, a refrigerated lunch box, and a lunch box that contained a hot plate. The winning inventor in each episode was determined by applause from the studio audience.

The show served as "an intermediary between success-seeking inventors, whose patented ideas need producers or funds, and manufacturers or investors". By early February 1953, manufacturers had bought five inventions demonstrated on the program, and 12 more devices were the subjects of negotiations between inventors and prospective purchasers.

The Big Idea was a local program on WCAU television in Philadelphia for three years before it moved to the network. It was initially broadcast on Mondays from 9 to 9:30 p.m. Eastern Time, which put it opposite I Love Lucy on CBS. In May 1953, it was moved to 10-10:30 p.m. E.T.

== Legacy ==
Although relatively short-lived, *The Big Idea* served as a precursor to later television formats that connected inventors with investors, such as modern-day pitch shows. It showcased the potential for broadcast media to serve as a platform for entrepreneurship and product innovation.

== Episode status ==
As with many DuMont series, no episodes are known to exist.

== See also ==
- List of programs broadcast by the DuMont Television Network
- List of surviving DuMont Television Network broadcasts

== Bibliography ==
- David Weinstein, The Forgotten Network: DuMont and the Birth of American Television (Philadelphia: Temple University Press, 2004) ISBN 1-59213-245-6
- Alex McNeil, Total Television, Fourth edition (New York: Penguin Books, 1980) ISBN 0-14-024916-8
- Tim Brooks and Earle Marsh, The Complete Directory to Prime Time Network TV Shows, Third edition (New York: Ballantine Books, 1964) ISBN 0-345-31864-1
