= My Hero (American TV series) =

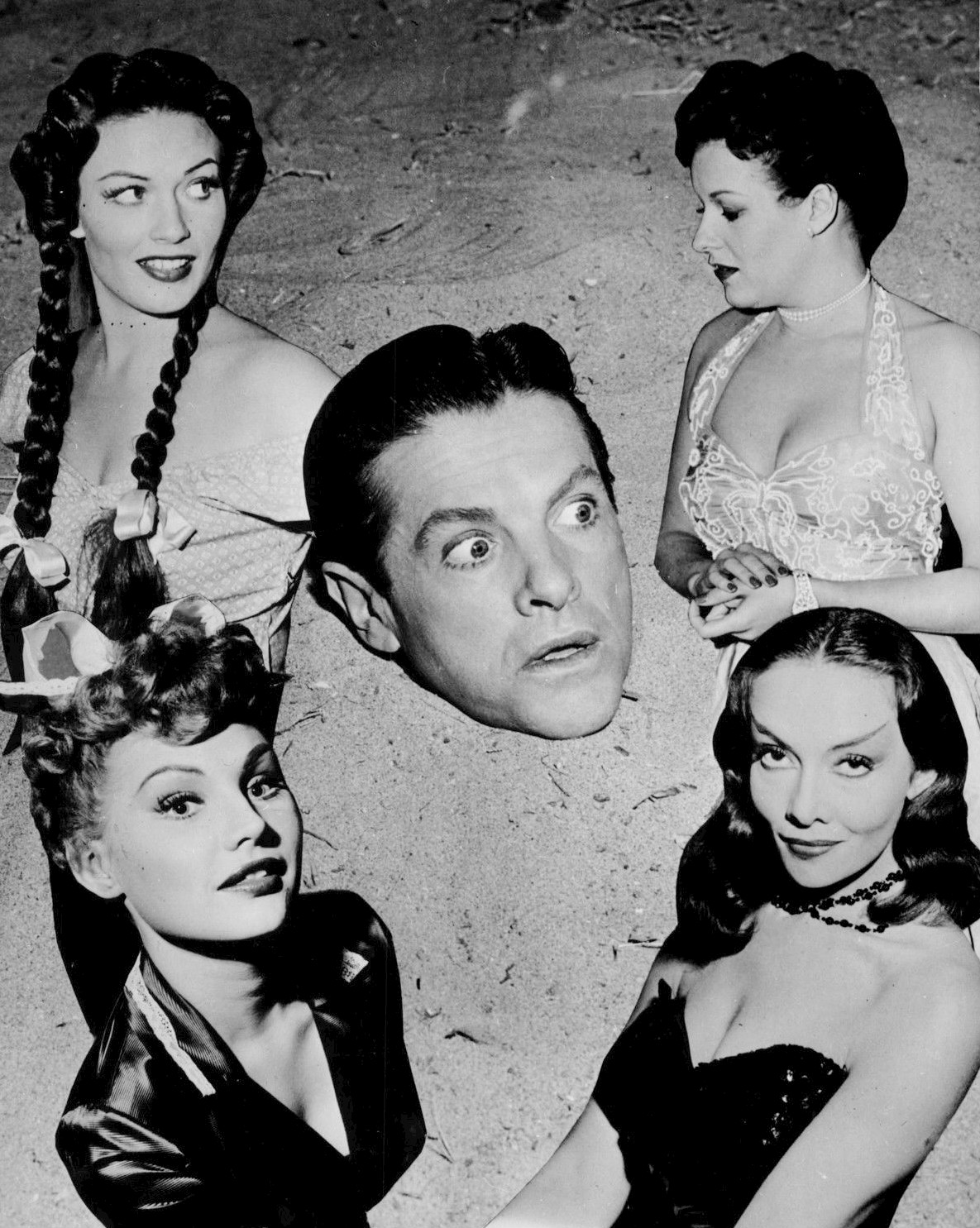
- Promotional photo for the show, 1952
- Genre: Situation comedy
- Directed by: Leslie Goodwins; Oscar Randolph; Robert Cummings
- Starring: Bob Cummings
- Composer: Leon Klatzkin
- Country of origin: United States
- Original language: English
- No. of seasons: 1
- No. of episodes: 33

Production
- Executive producer: Don W. Sharpe
- Producers: Robert Cummings; Mort Greene; Edmund Beloin
- Production company: Official Films

Original release
- Network: NBC
- Release: November 8, 1952 – June 20, 1953

My Hero is an American television sitcom that aired on NBC on Saturday nights from November 8, 1952, to June 20, 1953, under the sponsorship of Dunhill cigarettes. It was also shown in Melbourne, Australia, on ABV-2 during 1956/1957. The programme was the second import to be shown by ITV (ATV London) on 24 September 1955.

The series appears to have entered the public domain, with several episodes viewable on the Internet Archive. Most of these episodes are syndication copies which run about 24 minutes; The original broadcasts had featured a somewhat elaborate opening sequence involving well-dressed people entering a theater, including a sponsor I.D. (as can be seen on the episode The Big Crush), and this elaborate opening sequence was replaced with a very short (for the 1950s) opening sequence for syndicated repeats, resulting in a shorter running time.

== Premise ==
Robert Beanblossom was a real estate salesman who worked for Willis Thackery at the Thackery Realty Company.

== Cast ==
- Bob Cummings....Robert Beanblossom
- John Litel .....Willis Thackery
- Julie Bishop.....Julie Marshall

== Production ==
Mort Greene was hired to produce the show. He later alleged that Cummings tried to force Greene off the show and bring in his partner, Don Sharpe. Ed Boloin later joined as producer.

Cummings helped write and direct some episodes.

Over the series' run, the comedy was toned down. Scenes showing smoke blowing out of Cummings' ears during a kiss were eventually dropped after adult viewers claimed the show was tending too much to slapstick. "I'm not sure whether it was a good idea", said Cummings. "The kids loved it and we've had hundreds of letters of protest. And the kids often decide what the set is tuned to, at least until they go to bed."

The timeslot later shifted from 8-8.30pm.

Cummings reacted angrily to charges the show mistreated animals.

Cummings later complained that the lead character was too silly and too much of the writing was bad and illogical.

The show was executive produced and part owned by Don Sharpe, who was also connected with I Love Lucy and Terry and the Pirates. When My Hero was released to bad reviews, Sharpe admitted it needed fixing. "It's tricky to come up with something every week that's tricky and believable", he said. "We hope that eventually the personality of Cummings will become so dominant to the viewer that the plots won't look bad."

=== Lawsuit ===
Mort Greene was a producer and writer on the show. Greene later alleged that he was stripped of "all authority" on the show by Cummings and his wife, yet Cummings held him responsible for the "derisive commentary" the show received from reviewers. Greene said this hurt his reputation and sued the Cummingses for $119,500.

A sheriff tried to serve papers on Cummings concerning the lawsuit at the studio gate for RKO-Pathe in Culver City. He alleged that while he put the papers through the window Cummings drove his car, dragging the sheriff down the street. "I thought at the time he was an autograph seeker", said Cummings.

Both cases later settled out of court.

=== End of the show ===
According to one report, the show "enjoyed nothing but popularity. Cummings, who possesses histrionic depth and power far richer and deeper, nonetheless brought to a character implausibly named Beanblossom the full, heartwarming exaultation of the naive and ingenuous youth whom life has not and shall never hurt. The fantasy of the well meaning office worker was heightened from story to story, with characteristics out of a gamut of sources from Don Quixote, Paul Bunyan and Ivanhoe to Lohengrin."

Cummings reportedly turned down three film offers while making the show. It had a budget of $30,000 and was selling into syndication at $6,000 a week. Cummings, on the advice of his wife, elected to make no more episodes until they could wait and see what effect the show was having on demand for Cummings as an actor.

Cummings was offered $250,000 for his share in the show but he turned it down.

The show was repeated in 1954.

Cummings later said "I was a pretty unhappy lad after the failure" of the show. He admitted the failure of the series left him "as dead as it was possible to be in this business". He blamed this on going to air without a sufficient backlog of scripts. "[We] were constantly on a deadline and had to grab at every script that came along, good or bad." He also felt it was a mistake to aim the show at the children's audience. "Sure it's easy to develop a following that way but kids are the most fickle audience in the world. Once they drop you, you're finished forever." He rectified both these things for his next, more successful show, The Bob Cummings Show.

Cummings added that the show had a long run in syndication.

== Episodes ==
No.	Title	Original release date
1	"Oil Land"	November 8, 1952
2	"Lady Mortician"	November 15, 1952
3	"Movie Star"	November 22, 1952
4	"The Hillbilly"	November 29, 1952
5	"The Income Tax"	December 6, 1952
6	"The Cupid"	December 13, 1952
7	"Horse Trail" "Horsin' Around"	December 20, 1952
8	"The Lady Editor"	December 27, 1952
9	"El Toro"	January 3, 1953
10	"The Catering Story"	January 10, 1953
11	"The Hesse Story"	January 17, 1953
12	"The Fishing Story"	January 24, 1953
13	"The Tiger"	January 31, 1953
14	"The Boat"	February 7, 1953
15	"The Bicycle"	February 14, 1953
16	"Africa Calling"	February 21, 1953
17	"Sky High"	February 28, 1953
18	"Wheel of Fortune"	March 7, 1953
19	"Beauty and the Beast"	March 14, 1953
20	"Bum For A Day"	March 21, 1953
21	"Top Secret"	March 28, 1953
22	"The Big Crush"	April 4, 1953
23	"Arabian Night"	April 11, 1953
24	"Odd Man In"	April 18, 1953
25	"Jimmy Valentine"	April 25, 1953
26	"Very South Pacific"	May 2, 1953
27	"Viva Beanblossom"	May 9, 1953
28	"Jailbreak"	May 16, 1953
29	"Salt Water Daffy"	May 23, 1953
30	"Beauty Queen"	May 30, 1953
31	"Cinderella's Revenge"	June 6, 1953
32	"The Duel"	June 13, 1953
33	"Surprise Party"	June 20, 1953

== Reception ==
The Los Angeles Times thought the show would "rival I Love Lucy" in popularity. The New York Times accused it of being a copy of I Love Lucy and said "Cummings brought a magnificent terribleness to his part." The Los Angeles Times later called some golfing scenes between Cummings and Reginald Denny "some of the best comedy seen on TV."
