= 1951–52 United States network television schedule =

The following is the 1951–52 network television schedule for the four major English language commercial broadcast networks in the United States. The schedule covers primetime hours from September 1951 through March 1952. The schedule is followed by a list per network of returning series, new series, and series cancelled after the 1950–51 season. This was the first television season of national network interconnection by coaxial cable and microwave, meaning programming could be transmitted live coast-to-coast (or in the case of filmed programs, distributed simultaneously across the country) if needed.

On Sunday nights, NBC experimented with airing its new comedy-variety program Chesterfield Sound-off Time (featuring Bob Hope, Fred Allen and Jerry Lester as rotating hosts) in an early evening timeslot, 7:00–7:30. Previously, network TV variety programs had only been aired during late evening hours; NBC had experimented with a late-night show, Broadway Open House, with Lester as host the previous season, but that show was not considered a success (it was replaced by the more generic Mary Kay's Nightcap this season). According to television historians Castleman and Podrazik (1982), the experiment was designed to "duplicate the early-evening radio success of Jack Benny". (Benny himself would appear on rival network CBS's The Jack Benny Program immediately following Chesterfield Sound-off Time). Red Skelton also made his network television debut on NBC's Sunday night schedule this season, but long-term success eluded him until after he moved to CBS in the fall of 1953.

Although most TV programming was live, both CBS and NBC also experimented in filmed series; Castleman and Podrazik highlight early filmed hits I Love Lucy on CBS and Dragnet on NBC. Dragnet was "one of NBC's first major experiments in filmed TV series"; the series was added to NBC's regular network schedule in January 1952, after a "preview" on Chesterfield Sound-off Time in December 1951. I Love Lucy was given what historians have called a "choice time slot": Monday night immediately following the number one program on television: Arthur Godfrey's Talent Scouts. The series "proved the strength and acceptability of TV sitcoms, giving [CBS] a strong weapon against NBC's flashy comedy-variety hours".

DuMont, too, avoided flashy comedy series when in February 1952, in desperation the network added Bishop Fulton Sheen's program, Life Is Worth Living, to its Tuesday night schedule. The religious series was pitted against NBC's hit program Texaco Star Theater, and became the surprise hit of the year, holding its own against Texaco host "Uncle Miltie", and attracting a sponsor, an Emmy, and 10 million viewers. The ABC and CBS programs which aired in the same time slot, Charlie Wild, Private Detective, and The Frank Sinatra Show (respectively), attracted relatively few viewers.

New fall series are highlighted in bold.

Each of the 30 highest-rated shows is listed with its rank and rating as determined by Nielsen Media Research.

Yellow indicates the programs in the top 10 for the season.
Cyan indicates the programs in the top 20 for the season.
Magenta indicates the programs in the top 30 for the season.

== Sunday ==
Network		7:00 PM	7:30 PM	8:00 PM	8:30 PM	9:00 PM	9:30 PM	10:00 PM	10:30 PM
ABC		Paul Whiteman's Goodyear Revue	Music in Velvet	Admission Free		Other Lands, Other People	The Marshall Plan in Action	**Hour of Decision**	Youth on the March
CBS		The Gene Autry Show	This Is Show Business	Toast of the Town		The Fred Waring Show		Celebrity Time	What's My Line?
NBC	Fall	**Chesterfield Sound-off Time**	**Young Mr. Bobbin**	The Colgate Comedy Hour (5/45.3)		The Philco Television Playhouse (12/40.4) / **Goodyear Television Playhouse** (16/37.8)		**The Red Skelton Show** (4/50.2)	Leave It to the Girls
NBC	Summer	**Chesterfield Sound-off Time**	**Young Mr. Bobbin**	**The Big Payoff**		The Philco Television Playhouse (12/40.4) / **Goodyear Television Playhouse** (16/37.8)		**The Red Skelton Show** (4/50.2)	Leave It to the Girls
DMN		Local			Pentagon	Rocky King, Inside Detective	The Plainclothesman	They Stand Accused	

- On CBS, The Jack Benny Show (9/42.8) aired as occasional specials once every six to eight weeks at 7:30-8:00 pm.
- On NBC, Hopalong Cassidy (28/32.2) aired 6–7 p.m. until December, when it was partly replaced by **The Roy Rogers Show** (27/32.7), airing 6:30–7 p.m.

== Monday ==
Network		7:00 PM	7:30 PM	8:00 PM	8:30 PM	9:00 PM	9:30 PM	10:00 PM	10:30 PM
ABC	Fall	After the Deadlines (7:00) / Local (7:15)	Hollywood Screen Test	**The Amazing Mr. Malone** / **Mr. District Attorney**	Life Begins at Eighty	Curtain Up		The Bill Gwinn Show	Studs' Place
ABC	Spring	After the Deadlines (7:00) / Local (7:15)	Hollywood Screen Test	Mr. District Attorney / **Out of the Fog**	Life Begins at Eighty	Curtain Up		The Bill Gwinn Show	Studs' Place
CBS	Fall	Local	Douglas Edwards with the News (7:30) / The Perry Como Show (7:45)	Lux Video Theatre	Arthur Godfrey's Talent Scouts (1/53.8)	**I Love Lucy** (3/50.9)	It's News to Me	Studio One	
CBS	Spring	Local	Douglas Edwards with the News (7:30) / The Perry Como Show (7:45)	Lux Video Theatre	Arthur Godfrey's Talent Scouts (1/53.8)	**I Love Lucy** (3/50.9)	**Claudia**	Studio One	
NBC	Fall	Kukla, Fran and Ollie	Mohawk Showroom (7:30) / Camel News Caravan (7:45)	The Speidel Show/The Paul Winchell Show	The Voice of Firestone	Lights Out	Robert Montgomery Presents (26/34.4) / Somerset Maugham TV Theatre		Who Said That?
NBC	Follow-up	Kukla, Fran and Ollie (7:00) / Bob and Ray (7:15)	Mohawk Showroom (7:30) / Camel News Caravan (7:45)	The Speidel Show/The Paul Winchell Show	The Voice of Firestone	Lights Out	Robert Montgomery Presents (26/34.4) / Somerset Maugham TV Theatre		Who Said That?
NBC	Spring	Kukla, Fran and Ollie (7:00–7:15)	Mohawk Showroom (7:30) / Camel News Caravan (7:45)	The Speidel Show/The Paul Winchell Show	The Voice of Firestone	Lights Out	Robert Montgomery Presents (26/34.4) / Somerset Maugham TV Theatre		Who Said That?
NBC	Summer	Kukla, Fran and Ollie (7:00–7:15)	Mohawk Showroom (7:30) / Camel News Caravan (7:45)	The Speidel Show/The Paul Winchell Show	The Voice of Firestone	Lights Out	**Summer Stock Theatre**		Who Said That?
DMN		Captain Video and His Video Rangers	Local	Stage Entrance	The Johns Hopkins Science Review	Wrestling from Columbia Park			

Notes: On NBC, Kukla, Fran and Ollie was reduced from 30 to 15 minutes in November 1951, and Bob and Ray was added at 7:15 p.m. Bob and Ray ran in the 7:15 p.m. time slot Monday through Friday until March 1952 and then on Tuesday and Thursday only until May 1952, while Kukla, Fran and Ollie continued in its 15-minute format at 7:00 p.m. until June 1952. In January 1952, The Speidel Show was renamed for its star, Paul Winchell, becoming The Paul Winchell Show.

== Tuesday ==
Network		7:00 PM	7:30 PM	8:00 PM	8:30 PM	9:00 PM	9:30 PM	10:00 PM	10:30 PM
ABC		After the Deadlines (7:00) / Local (7:15)	The Beulah Show	Charlie Wild, Private Detective	What Do You Think?	United or Not	On Trial	Q.E.D.	The Symphony
CBS		Local	Douglas Edwards with the News (7:30) / The Stork Club (7:45)	The Frank Sinatra Show		Crime Syndicated / **City Hospital**	Suspense	Danger	MLB
NBC	Fall	Kukla, Fran and Ollie	The Little Show (7:30) / Camel News Caravan (7:45)	Texaco Star Theater (2/52.0)		Fireside Theatre (7/43.1)	Armstrong Circle Theatre (24/34.7)	The Original Amateur Hour	
NBC	Follow-up	Kukla, Fran and Ollie (7:00) / Bob and Ray (7:15)	The Little Show (7:30) / Camel News Caravan (7:45)	Texaco Star Theater (2/52.0)		Fireside Theatre (7/43.1)	Armstrong Circle Theatre (24/34.7)	The Original Amateur Hour	
NBC	Summer	Kukla, Fran and Ollie (7:00) / Bob and Ray (7:15)	The Little Show (7:30) / Camel News Caravan (7:45)	Local		**Boss Lady**	Armstrong Circle Theatre (24/34.7)	The Original Amateur Hour	
DMN		Captain Video and His Video Rangers	Local	What's the Story	Keep Posted	Cosmopolitan Theatre		Hands of Mystery	Local

Note: On NBC, Kukla, Fran and Ollie was reduced from 30 to 15 minutes in November 1951, and Bob and Ray was added at 7:15 p.m. Bob and Ray ran in the 7:15 p.m. time slot Monday through Friday until March 1952 and then on Tuesday and Thursday only until May 1952, while Kukla, Fran and Ollie continued in its 15-minute format at 7:00 p.m. until June 1952.

== Wednesday ==
Network		7:00 PM	7:30 PM	8:00 PM	8:30 PM	9:00 PM	9:30 PM	10:00 PM	10:30 PM
ABC		After the Deadlines (7:00) / Local (7:15)	Chance of a Lifetime	Paul Dixon Show		Don McNeill's TV Club / The Arthur Murray Party	The Clock	**Celanese Theater** / **Pulitzer Prize Playhouse***	
CBS		Local	Douglas Edwards with the News (7:30) / The Perry Como Show (7:45)	Arthur Godfrey and His Friends (6/43.3)		Strike It Rich (25/34.5)	The Web	Pabst Blue Ribbon Bouts (10:00) (17/37.5) / Sports Spot (10:45)	
NBC	Fall	Kukla, Fran and Ollie	The Mohawk Showroom (7:30) / Camel News Caravan (7:45)	**The Kate Smith Evening Hour**		Kraft Television Theatre (23/34.8)		Break the Bank	The Freddy Martin Show
NBC	Follow-up	Kukla, Fran and Ollie (7:00) / Bob and Ray (7:15)	The Mohawk Showroom (7:30) / Camel News Caravan (7:45)	**The Kate Smith Evening Hour**		Kraft Television Theatre (23/34.8)		Break the Bank	The Freddy Martin Show
NBC	Spring	Kukla, Fran and Ollie (7:00–7:15)	The Mohawk Showroom (7:30) / Camel News Caravan (7:45)	**The Kate Smith Evening Hour**		Kraft Television Theatre (23/34.8)		Break the Bank	The Freddy Martin Show
DMN		Captain Video and His Video Rangers	Local			The Gallery of Mme. Liu-Tsong	Shadow of the Cloak	Local	

Notes: On NBC, Kukla, Fran and Ollie was reduced from 30 to 15 minutes in November 1951, and Bob and Ray was added at 7:15 p.m. Bob and Ray ran in the 7:15 p.m. time slot Monday through Friday until March 1952 and then on Tuesday and Thursday only until May 1952, while Kukla, Fran and Ollie continued in its 15-minute format at 7:00 p.m. until June 1952.

(*) From December 1951 to June 1952, these shows were 30 minutes, 10pm to 10:30pm ET

== Thursday ==
Network		7:00 PM	7:30 PM	8:00 PM	8:30 PM	9:00 PM	9:30 PM	10:00 PM	10:30 PM
ABC		After the Deadlines (7:00) / Local (7:15)	The Lone Ranger (18/36.8)	Stop the Music		**Herb Shriner Time**	**Gruen Guild Playhouse**	Paul Dixon Show	Masland at Home Party (10:30) / The Carmel Myers Show (10:45)
CBS	Fall	Local	Douglas Edwards with the News (7:30) / The Stork Club (7:45)	The George Burns and Gracie Allen Show / **The Garry Moore Evening Show**	Amos 'n' Andy (13/38.9)	The Alan Young Show (22/35.8)	Big Town (15/38.5)	Racket Squad (29/32.0) (Tied with Man Against Crime)	Crime Photographer
CBS	December	Local	Douglas Edwards with the News (7:30) / The Stork Club (7:45)	The George Burns and Gracie Allen Show / Star of the Family	Amos 'n' Andy (13/38.9)	The Alan Young Show (22/35.8)	Big Town (15/38.5)	Racket Squad (29/32.0) (Tied with Man Against Crime)	Crime Photographer
CBS	June	Local	Douglas Edwards with the News (7:30) / The Stork Club (7:45)	The George Burns and Gracie Allen Show	Amos 'n' Andy (13/38.9)	The Alan Young Show (22/35.8)	Big Town (15/38.5)	Racket Squad (29/32.0) (Tied with Man Against Crime)	Crime Photographer
NBC	Fall	Kukla, Fran and Ollie	The Little Show (7:30) / Camel News Caravan (7:45)	You Bet Your Life (10/42.1)	Treasury Men in Action	Ford Festival (The James Melton Show)		Martin Kane, Private Eye	Wayne King
NBC	November	Kukla, Fran and Ollie (7:00) / Bob and Ray (7:15)	The Little Show (7:30) / Camel News Caravan (7:45)	You Bet Your Life (10/42.1)	Treasury Men in Action	Ford Festival (The James Melton Show)		Martin Kane, Private Eye	Wayne King
NBC	Winter	Kukla, Fran and Ollie (7:00) / Bob and Ray (7:15)	The Little Show (7:30) / Camel News Caravan (7:45)	You Bet Your Life (10/42.1)	Treasury Men in Action	**Dragnet** (20/36.3) (Tied with All-Star Revue)	Local	Martin Kane, Private Eye	Wayne King
NBC	Spring	Kukla, Fran and Ollie (7:00) / Bob and Ray (7:15)	The Little Show (7:30) / Camel News Caravan (7:45)	You Bet Your Life (10/42.1)	Treasury Men in Action	**Dragnet** (20/36.3) (Tied with All-Star Revue) / **Gangbusters** (14/38.7)	Local	Martin Kane, Private Eye	Wayne King
DMN		Captain Video and His Video Rangers	Local	Georgetown University Forum	Broadway to Hollywood – Headline Clues	The Adventures of Ellery Queen	**Crawford Mystery Theatre**	The Bigelow Theatre	Local (10:30) / Football This Week (10:45)

Notes: Wayne King was seen only on NBC's Midwest Network. On NBC, Kukla, Fran and Ollie was reduced from 30 to 15 minutes in November 1951, and Bob and Ray was added at 7:15 p.m. Bob and Ray ran in the 7:15 p.m. time slot Monday through Friday until March 1952 and then on Tuesday and Thursday only until May 1952, while Kukla, Fran and Ollie continued in its 15-minute format at 7:00 p.m. until June 1952.

== Friday ==
Network		7:00 PM	7:30 PM	8:00 PM	8:30 PM	9:00 PM	9:30 PM	10:00 PM	10:30 PM
ABC		After the Deadlines (7:00) / Local (7:15)	Life With Linkletter / Say It with Acting	**Mystery Theater**	The Stu Erwin Show*	**Crime with Father**	Tales of Tomorrow / Versatile Varieties*	Hollywood Premiere Theatre / **The Dell O'Dell Show**	Industries for America
CBS	Fall	The Stork Club	Douglas Edwards with the News (7:30) / The Perry Como Show (7:45)	Mama (11/41.3)	Man Against Crime (29/32.0) (Tied with Racket Squad)	**Schlitz Playhouse of Stars**		Live Like a Millionaire	Hollywood Opening Night
CBS	Spring	Local	Douglas Edwards with the News (7:30) / The Perry Como Show (7:45)	Mama (11/41.3)	My Friend Irma	**Schlitz Playhouse of Stars**	It's News to Me	**Police Story**	Presidential Timber
NBC	Fall	Kukla, Fran and Ollie	The Mohawk Showroom (7:30) / Camel News Caravan (7:45)	Quiz Kids	We, the People	The Big Story	The Aldrich Family	Gillette Cavalcade of Sports (10:00) (19/36.5) / Greatest Fights of the Century (10:45)	
NBC	Follow-up	Kukla, Fran and Ollie (7:00) / Bob and Ray (7:15)	The Mohawk Showroom (7:30) / Camel News Caravan (7:45)	Quiz Kids	We, the People	The Big Story	The Aldrich Family	Gillette Cavalcade of Sports (10:00) (19/36.5) / Greatest Fights of the Century (10:45)	
NBC	Spring	Kukla, Fran and Ollie (7:00-7:15)	The Mohawk Showroom (7:30) / Camel News Caravan (7:45)	Quiz Kids	We, the People	The Big Story	The Aldrich Family	Gillette Cavalcade of Sports (10:00) (19/36.5) / Greatest Fights of the Century (10:45)	
DMN		Captain Video and His Video Rangers	Local	Twenty Questions	You Asked For It	Down You Go	Front Page Detective	Cavalcade of Stars	

Notes: Henry Morgan's Great Talent Hunt replaced Versatile Varieties on January 26, 1951.

On NBC, Kukla, Fran and Ollie was reduced from 30 to 15 minutes in November 1951, and Bob and Ray was added at 7:15 p.m. Bob and Ray ran in the 7:15 p.m. time slot Monday through Friday until March 1952 and then on Tuesday and Thursday only until May 1952, while Kukla, Fran and Ollie continued in its 15-minute format at 7:00 p.m. until June 1952.

* also known as Trouble With Father

== Saturday ==
Network		7:00 PM	7:30 PM	8:00 PM	8:30 PM	9:00 PM	9:30 PM	10:00 PM	10:30 PM
ABC		The Ruggles	The Jerry Colonna Show	Paul Whiteman's TV Teen Club		**Lesson in Safety**	America's Health	**Harness Racing**	
CBS		**The Sammy Kaye Variety Show**	Beat the Clock	The Ken Murray Show		Faye Emerson's Wonderful Town	The Show Goes On	Songs for Sale	
NBC	Fall	**The American Youth Forum**	One Man's Family	All-Star Revue (20/36.3) (Tied with Dragnet)		Your Show of Shows (8/43.0)			Your Hit Parade
NBC	Summer	**The American Youth Forum**	Bob and Ray	All-Star Revue (20/36.3) (Tied with Dragnet)		Blind Date	Local		Your Hit Parade
DMN		Local					Wrestling From Marigold		

Notes: On NBC, All-Star Revue formerly was known as Four Star Revue. Bob and Ray, broadcast earlier in the season as a 15-minute weeknight program, expanded to 30 minutes and ran from July to August at 7:30 p.m. Eastern Time.

== By network ==
=== ABC ===
**Returning Series**

- Admission Free
- After the Deadlines
- America's Health
- The Arthur Murray Party
- The Beulah Show
- The Bill Gwinn Show
- The Carmel Myers Show
- Chance of a Lifetime
- Charlie Wild, Private Detective (moved from CBS)
- The Clock (moved from NBC)
- Curtain Up
- Don McNeill's TV Club
- Hollywood Premiere Theatre
- Hollywood Screen Test
- Industries for America
- The Jerry Colonna Show
- Life Begins at Eighty
- Life with Linkletter
- The Lone Ranger
- The Marshall Plan in Action
- Masland at the Party
- Music in Velvet
- On Trial
- Other Lands, Other People
- The Paul Dixon Show
- Paul Whiteman's Goodyear Revue
- Q.E.D.
- The Ruggles
- Say It with Acting
- Stop the Music
- Studs's Place
- The Symphony
- United or Not
- Versatile Varieties
- The Voice of Firestone
- What Do You Think?
- Wrestling from Rainbo Arena
- You Asked For It
- Youth on the March

**New Series**

- **The Amazing Mr. Malone**
- **Betty Crocker Star Matinee**
- **The Big Picture**
- **Byline** *
- **Celanese Theater**
- **Crime with Father**
- **Curtain Call** *
- **The Dell O'Dell Show**
- **Gruen Guild Playhouse**
- **Harness Racing**
- **Herb Shriner Time**
- **Hour of Decision**
- **Lesson in Safety**
- **Mr. Arsenic** *
- **Mystery Theatre**
- **The Name's the Same**
- **Out of the Fog** *
- **Personal Appearance Theater**
- **Rebound**
- **Say It with Acting**
- **Tales of Tomorrow**
- **Trouble with Father**

Not returning from 1950–51:

- The Billy Rose Show
- Buck Rogers
- Can You Top This?
- Club Seven
- The College Bowl
- Dick Tracy
- Faith Baldwin Romance Theatre
- Feature Film
- First Nighter
- The Game of the Week
- Holiday Hotel
- I Cover Times Square
- Penthouse Party
- Pro Football Highlights
- Roller Derby
- Sandy Dreams
- Showtime U.S.A.
- Sit or Miss
- Soap Box Theater

=== CBS ===
**Returning Series**

- The Alan Young Show
- Amos 'n' Andy
- Arthur Godfrey's Talent Scouts
- Beat the Clock
- Big Town
- Celebrity Time
- Claudia (moved from NBC in midseason)
- Crime Photographer
- Danger
- Douglas and the News
- Faye Emerson's Wonderful Town
- The Frank Sinatra Show
- The Fred Waring Show
- The Garry Moore Show
- The Gene Autry Show
- The George Burns and Gracie Allen Show
- Hollywood Opening Night
- It's News to Me
- The Jack Benny Show
- The Ken Murray Show
- Live Like a Millionaire
- Lux Video Theatre
- Mama
- Man Against Crime
- Our Miss Brooks
- Pabst Blue Ribbon Bouts
- The Perry Como Show
- Racket Squad
- The Show Goes On
- Songs for Sale
- Sports Spot
- Star of the Family
- The Stork Club
- Strike It Rich
- Studio One
- Suspense
- This is Show Business
- Toast of the Town
- The Web
- What's My Line?

**New Series**

- **The Al Pearce Show** *
- **CBS Television Workshop** *
- **City Hospital** *
- **Crime Syndicated**
- **The Eddy Arnold Show** *
- **Footlights Theater** *
- **The Garry Moore Evening Show**
- **Hollywood Opening Night**
- **I Love Lucy**
- **MLB**
- **Police Story** *
- **The Sammy Kaye Variety Show**
- **Schlitz Playhouse of Stars**
- **See It Now**
- **Star of the Family**
- **What in the World?**

Not returning from 1950–51:

- The Ad-Libbers
- Big Top
- Faye Emerson's Wonderful Town
- The Goldbergs
- The Horace Heidt Show
- Magnavox Theater
- Prudential Family Playhouse
- Sing It Again
- Sure as Fate
- Teller of Take
- The Vaughn Monroe Show
- We Take Your Word
- Who's Whose

=== DuMont ===
**Returning series**

- The Adventures of Ellery Queen
- The Arthur Murray Party
- The Bigelow Theatre (moved from ABC
- Broadway to Hollywood
- Captain Video and His Video Rangers
- Cavalcade of Stars
- Cosmopolitan Theatre
- Down You Go
- Football This Week
- Front Page Detective
- The Gallery of Mme. Liu-Tsong
- Georgetown University Forum
- Hands of Mystery
- Johnny Olson's Rumpus Room
- The Johns Hopkins Science Review
- Keep Posted
- Major Dell Conway of the Flying Tigers
- Not for Publication
- Pentagon
- The Plainclothesman
- Rocky King, Inside Detective
- Shadow of the Cloak
- Stage Entrance
- They Stand Accused
- Twenty Questions
- What's the Story
- Wrestling from Columbia Park
- Wrestling from Marigold
- You Asked For It

**New series**

- **Battle of the Ages** *
- **The Cases of Eddie Drake** *
- **Cosmopolitan Theatre**
- **Crawford Mystery Theatre**
- **Football This Week**
- **The Gallery of Mme. Liu-Tsong**
- **Guess What** *
- **Guide Right** *
- **News Gal**
- **The Pet Shop** *
- **Public Prosecutor**
- **The Talent Shop**
- **This is Music**

Not returning from 1950–51:

- The Al Morgan Show
- The Armed Forces Hour
- Cavalcade of Bands
- Country Style
- DuMont Royal Theater
- The Hazel Scott Show
- Ladies Before Gentlemen
- Manhattan Spotlight
- The Most Important People
- Okay, Mother
- Once Upon a Tune
- Our Secret Weapon: The Truth
- Rhythm Rodeo
- Saturday Night at the Garden
- The Susan Raye Show
- Visit with Armed Forces
- With This Ring
- Wrestling from Columbia Park Arena

=== NBC ===
**Returning Series**

- The Aldrich Family
- All-Star Revue
- Armstrong Circle Theatre
- The Big Story
- Blind Date
- Break the Bank
- Camel News Caravan
- Cameo Theatre
- Candid Camera
- Colgate Comedy Hour
- Duffy's Tavern
- Fireside Theatre
- Ford Festival
- The Freddy Martin Show
- Gillette Cavalcade of Sports
- Goodyear Television Playhouse
- Greatest Fights of the Century
- The Halls of Ivy
- The Kate Smith Evening Hour
- Kraft Television Theatre
- Leave It to the Girls
- Lights Out
- The Little Show
- Martin Kane, Private Eye
- The Mohawk Showroom
- The Paul Winchell Show
- One Man's Family
- The Original Amateur Hour
- The Philco Television Playhouse
- Quiz Kids
- Robert Montgomery Presents
- Somerset Maugham TV Theatre
- Texaco Star Theater
- Treasury Men in Action (moved from ABC)
- The Voice of Firestone
- Watch Mr. Wizard
- Wayne King
- We, the People
- Who Said That?
- You Bet Your Life
- Your Hit Parade
- Your Show of Shows
- Your Story Theatre

**New Series**

- **American Youth Forum**
- **The Big Payoff** *
- **The Bill Goodwin Show**
- **Bob and Ray** *
- **Boss Lady** *
- **Chesterfield Sound-off Time**
- **Claudia** *
- **The Dinah Shore Show**
- **Dragnet** *
- **Ford Festival** *
- **Gangbusters** *
- **Henry Morgan's Great Talent Hunt**
- **The Kate Smith Evening Hour**
- **Kukla, Fran and Ollie**
- **Public Prosecutor**
- **The Red Skelton Show**
- **The Roy Rogers Show**
- **Summer Stock Theatre** *
- **Young Mr. Bobbin**
- **Your Prize Story** *

Not returning from 1950–51:

- Bonny Maid Versatile Varieties
- Garroway at Large
- Greatest Fights of the Century
- The Hank McCune Show
- Hawkins Falls
- Henry Morgan's Great Talent Hunt
- The Jack Carter Show
- Kay Kyser's Kollege of Musical Knowledge
- The Mohawk Showroom
- Saturday Roundup
- Screen Directors Playhouse
- Seven at Eleven
- Short Story Playhouse
- The Speidel Show
- The Straw Hat Matinee
- Tag the Gag
- Take a Chance
- The Wayne King Show

Note: The * indicates that the program was introduced in midseason.
