= Frank Van Hoven =

American stage magician and comic entertainer (1886–1929)

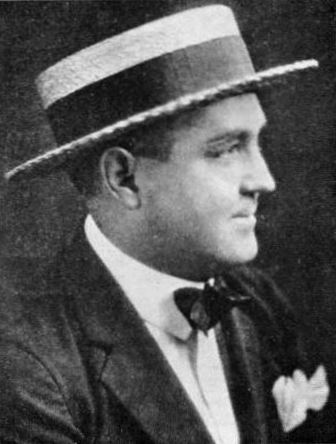
- Van Hoven in 1922
- Born: Frank Raymond Van Hoven; February 5, 1886; Sioux City, Iowa, U.S.
- Died: January 11, 1929 (aged 42); Birmingham, England
- Other name: The Mad Magician
- Occupations: Stage magician, comic entertainer

Frank Raymond Van Hoven (February 5, 1886 – January 11, 1929) was an American stage magician and comic entertainer.

== Life and career ==
Van Hoven was born in Sioux City, Iowa; his father was a Dutch immigrant. He worked in fairgrounds and attempted to become a juggler before being persuaded by Dante the Magician to try his hand at stage magic. He was an assistant to his uncle, illusionist Paul Kleist, before going solo in shows run by Gus Sun in the Midwest. He was not immediately successful and was fired by Sun, but moved to New York. There, he started to develop an act, inspired by English conjurer William J. Hiller, based around his tricks going wrong, occasioning great audience hilarity.

As reported by the Indianapolis Times in 1921:

Van Hoven bills himself as the “Dippy Mad Magician.” He is more than that—he is the comedy Jester divine of the stage. He works like a whirlwind and he reaps as many laughs as the weatherman puts snowflakes in a 100 per cent blizzard. Van Hoven rushes In on the stage, talking to himself, pulling this would-be trlck, exposing the other trick, forgetting his "props," then rushing through the house to find a "boy" and then trotting back with the most "nonambitious trio" of boys I have ever seen. Then follows the funniest mixup of boys. Ice, man, a woman's handkerchief, stage property and everything else I have ever seen. Van Hoven, in my humble judgment, Is the funniest man on the stage. He is "wild," and his fun is even more wild.

He became known as "The Man Who Made Ice Famous" because of an act in which two stooges would be asked to hold large blocks of ice, while Van Hoven would ponder what to do with them, leave the stage only to return with a glass of beer, and then try but fail to perform a trick to make a handkerchief appear inside the ice. His antics left audiences highly amused and he became well-known, touring widely in both the U.S. and in British music halls in the 1920s.

He died from pneumonia at the age of 42, in Birmingham, England, while touring there in 1929. Those receiving news of his death reportedly thought it was another of his practical jokes. After his death, some of his props and act were taken on by fellow performer Dell O'Dell.
