= Stage Entrance =

American TV variety and interview series (1951–1952)

- Directed by: Bill Seaman
- Starring: Earl Wilson (host)
- Country of origin: United States

Production
- Producer: Ted Hammerstein
- Running time: 15 minutes

Original release
- Network: DuMont
- Release: May 2, 1951 – March 2, 1952

Stage Entrance is an American variety and interview television show broadcast on the DuMont Television Network.

== Format ==
The host, Broadway columnist Earl Wilson, interviewed "established stars and young hopefuls" in addition to providing news about show business. On the quarter-hour episodes, Wilson typically had one famous guest and one newcomer. Artists who appeared on the program included Charlie Parker and Dizzy Gillespie, who received Downbeat Awards on the February 24, 1952, episode. Other guests included Jack Leonard, Barbara Nichols, Buddy Rich, and Mel Torme.

== Episode status ==
As with most DuMont series, no complete episodes are known to exist. A short clip exists of an episode from February 24, 1952 featuring Leonard Feather presenting awards from Downbeat to Parker and Gillespie, and then a performance from Charlie Parker, Dizzy Gillespie, Dick Hyman, Sandy Block, and Charlie Smith.

== Production ==
Tod Hammerstein was the producer, and Bill Seaman was the director. The program initially was broadcast on Wednesdays from 7:45 to 8 p.m. Eastern Time. In September 1951 it was moved to Mondays from 8 to 8:30 p.m. E. T. Its final time slot, beginning in December 1951, was Sundays from 7 to 7:30 p.m. E. T. The show was canceled effective March 2, 1952; it was replaced by Georgetown University Forum, which had been seen at 6:30 p.m. E. T. on Sundays.

== See also ==
- List of programs broadcast by the DuMont Television Network
- List of surviving DuMont Television Network broadcasts
- 1951-52 United States network television schedule
