= Young Mr. Bobbin =

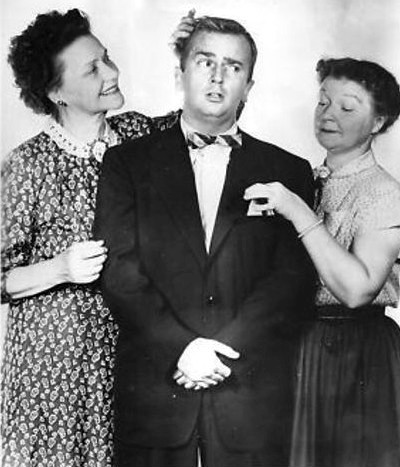
- Aunt Clara (left) and Aunt Bertie (right) fuss over Bobbin, 1951.
- Genre: Sitcom
- Starring: Jackie Kelk; Pat Hosley; Nydia Westman; Jane Seymour
- Country of origin: United States
- Original language: English

Production
- Camera setup: Multi-camera
- Running time: 22–24 minutes

Original release
- Network: NBC
- Release: August 29, 1951 – May 18, 1952

Young Mr. Bobbin is an American television situation comedy that aired live on the NBC network during the 1951-1952 season.

== Synopsis ==
The series stars Jackie Kelk as Alexander Hawthorne Bobbin, a young high school graduate who lived with his maiden aunts and was in love with the girl next door, Nancy (Pat Hosley). Nydia Westman and Jane Seymour co-star as Bobbin's aunts. The series was canceled after one season.
