= Frank Blair (journalist) =

American broadcast journalist

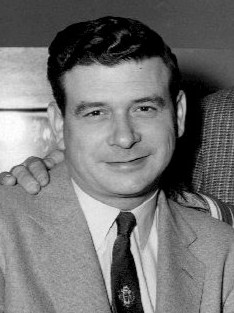
- Blair in 1953
- Born: Frank S. Blair Jr. May 30, 1915; Yemassee, South Carolina, U.S.
- Died: March 14, 1995 (aged 79); Hilton Head Island, South Carolina, U.S.
- Education: College of Charleston
- Occupations: Newscaster, journalist, author
- Spouse: Lillian
- Children: eight

Frank S. Blair Jr. (May 30, 1915 – March 14, 1995) was a broadcast journalist for NBC News, perhaps best known for being the news anchor on the Today program from 1953 to 1975.

== Early years ==
Blair was born on May 30, 1915, in Yemassee, South Carolina. His family moved to Walterboro, South Carolina, during his infancy and later moved to Charleston, South Carolina.

He was a Boy Scout, attaining the rank of Eagle Scout in 1930. As an adult, he was honored with the Distinguished Eagle Scout Award. He attended the College of Charleston prior to beginning his broadcasting career in various radio stations in South Carolina in the 1930s, leaving his pre-med studies at the college to join a theatrical touring company.

== Radio ==
Blair's radio debut was at WCSC in Charleston, South Carolina, in 1935. Later that year, he joined WIS in Columbia, South Carolina, as a newscaster. In 1937, he became program director at WFBC in Greenville, South Carolina. Several months later, he left there to join WOL in Washington, D.C., where his job included announcing for the Mutual Broadcasting System.

When NBC radio's Monitor weekend program began in 1955, Blair was one of the first news anchors.

== Military service ==
Beginning in 1942, Blair served in the U.S. Navy as a flight instructor and transport pilot during World War II before resuming his broadcast career after the war.

== Television ==
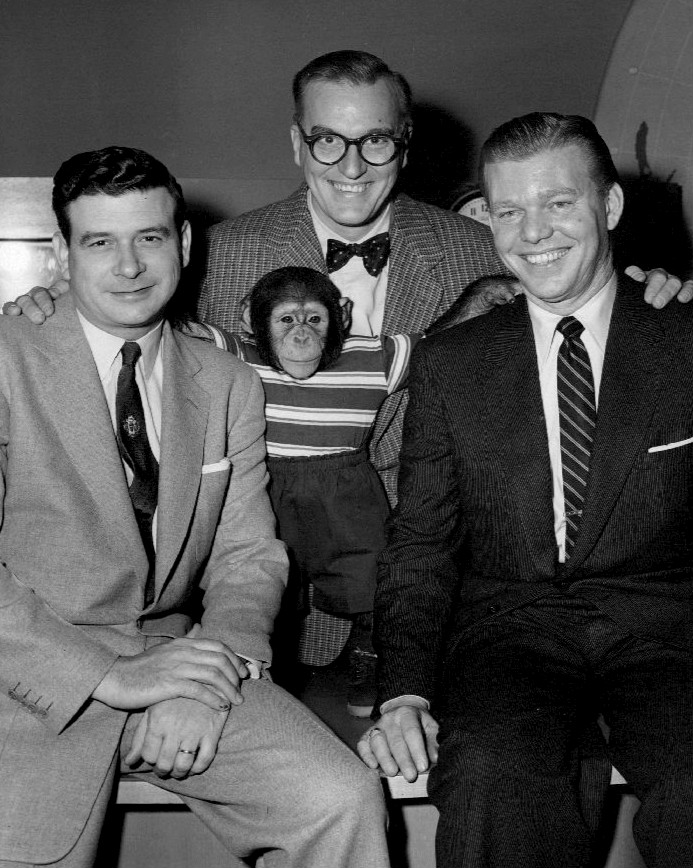
Blair (left) with the rest of the 1953 Today show cast, including J. Fred Muggs

In 1951, Blair began his television career as the host of Heritage, an NBC cultural series broadcast live from Washington's National Gallery of Art. From 1951 to 1953, he was the moderator of Georgetown University Forum on the DuMont Television Network. Blair became the news editor and on-air newscaster for Today in 1953, continuing in those roles until he retired in 1975.

Stephen Battaglio, in his book, From Yesterday to Today: Six Decades of America's Favorite Morning Show, described Blair as "a protege of legendary broadcaster Lowell Thomas and a consummate professional." Cathleen M. Londino opined in her book, The Today Show: Transforming Morning Television that one "reason for his success seemed to be that because he was so expressionless in reading the news, he read it in a completely objective manner. 'One could never tell where he stood on what he was reading. In all of his 22 years on the air, nobody can remember hearing him express a single viewpoint.'"

== Personal life ==
Blair and his wife, Lillian had eight children. He retired from NBC in 1975 to Hilton Head Island, South Carolina. In 1979, he published his autobiography, Let's be Frank About It, in which he discussed his life and career, including some bouts with alcoholism.

== Death ==
Blair died in Hilton Head in 1995, 20 years to the day from his final NBC broadcast.
