= Hands of Murder =

American TV mystery anthology series (1949–1951)

- Also known as: Hands of Mystery; Hands of Destiny
- Genre: Mystery/Anthology
- Created by: Lawrence Menkin
- Starring: Gene Barry; Brian Keith; Jack Palance; Marjorie Reynolds; Gale Storm
- Country of origin: United States
- Original language: English

Production
- Producer: James Caddigan
- Camera setup: Multi-camera
- Running time: 25 mins.

Original release
- Network: DuMont
- Release: August 24, 1949 – December 11, 1951

Hands of Murder (also known as Hands of Mystery and Hands of Destiny) is an American mystery anthology series that aired on the DuMont Television Network from August 24, 1949, through December 11, 1951.

== Broadcast history ==
Hands of Murder originated as an episode of Dumont's Program Playhouse.

Initially titled Hands of Destiny, the show ended on March 11, 1952. and was a prime time mystery/anthology series. The title changed to Hands of Mystery with the September 8, 1950, broadcast.

The show was initially broadcast on Fridays from 8 to 8:30 p.m. Eastern Time. In July 1950, it was moved to the 9-9:30 p.m. E. T. slot on Fridays. In September 1951, it was moved to Tuesdays from 10 to 10:30 p.m. E. T., and it remained there until it ended.

The series originated from WABD. Producers included Charles Parsons and James L. Caddigan. Directors included Lawrence Menkin and Pat Fay. Frank Bunetta created the program's special camera effects. Menkin and Charles Speer were the writers. Lew White composed the music, which the trade publication Radio Daily described as "complete scores, as is done at motion picture studios", rather than "merely providing background and bridges".

Most of the actors on the show had experience performing on Broadway and on TV, and most were not well-known.

Bond Clothes ended its sponsorship of Hands of Murder in late April 1951. The trade publication Billboard said that conflicting reports existed regarding the reason for cancellation, but the primary cause seemed to be Dumont's refusal to have its Pittsburgh affiliate carry the program live. Billboard cited "the importance of Pittsburgh in the Bond merchandising operation".

== Episodes ==
- July 9, 1950 - "Too Old to Live"

== Production ==
Hands of Murder used production techniques that differed from other TV programs of its era. One was the use of "30 to 45 short, intimate scenes" presented "in rapid-fire order", which created an effect similar to watching a full-length film in a half-hour. A related technique was the use of "block impressions", such as moving from a scene of a man in his house to a scene showing him at a pharmacy, eliminating the need to show him in transition from one place to the other. Use of closeup reduced the size of sets and focused attention more on actors' actions than on activity around the actors. The show used no film because, Caddigan said, "Film destroys the intimacy between the viewer and the actors." Also, actors wore no makeup in order to create more intimacy. Menkin said the lack of makeup created "an atmosphere of stark reality."

== Critical response ==
A review of the August 31, 1949, episode in Billboard praised the program's variation from the norm for TV production. "For here, at last," it said, "is a half-hour show which leaves the audience as satisfied and emotionally exhausted as a 90-minute movie. Isn't that what TV has been groping for?" The review said that instead of using cameras on a stage play the show created "a picture story, told by the camera". The acting and the script also were complimented.

== See also ==
- List of programs broadcast by the DuMont Television Network
- List of surviving DuMont Television Network broadcasts
- 1949-50 United States network television schedule
- 1950-51 United States network television schedule
- 1951-52 United States network television schedule

== Bibliography ==
- David Weinstein, The Forgotten Network: DuMont and the Birth of American Television (Philadelphia: Temple University Press, 2004) ISBN 1-59213-245-6
