= The Show Goes On (TV series) =

American TV variety series (1950–1952)

The Show Goes On is a variety show that aired in the United States on CBS from January 19, 1950, to January 16, 1952. Robert Q. Lewis was the host. After the debut episode, the program was broadcast on alternate Thursdays at 8 p.m. Eastern Time.

== Premise ==
The show featured celebrities who appraised new talent as they competed for actual nightclub and theater bookings. Performers who appeared on the program included singer Gloria Lane. A buyer had three choices for the act that he or she auditioned: hiring it, rejecting it, or taking a 24-hour option on it.

The opening theme, titled "The Show Goes On Opening", was composed by Raymond A. Bloch.

== Production ==
Lester Gottlieb was the producer, and Alex Leftwich was the director. Lou Meltzer was the writer, and Bloch led the orchestra. The program originated from WCBS-TV, and the sound was recorded for broadcast on radio. The radio version was broadcast on Fridays at 8 p.m. E.T. from January 20, 1950, until July 4, 1950.

== Critical response ==
A review in the trade publication Billboard complimented Lewis's ad libbing and said that he "did a good job in holding the show together." It noted that the interviews with performers were "at least as interesting as the performances" and suggested that a full hour might be too much time for this type of program, which might instead be trimmed into "a tighter, faster 30-minute stanza."

== See also ==
- 1951-52 United States network television schedule
