= Henry Morgan's Great Talent Hunt =

- Genre: Variety TV show
- Starring: Henry Morgan; Kaye Ballard; Art Carney; Pert Kelton; Arnold Stang
- Country of origin: United States
- Original language: English

Production
- Running time: 30 minutes

Original release
- Network: NBC
- Release: 26 January – 1 June 1951

Henry Morgan's Great Talent Hunt is a TV series on NBC Television hosted by Henry Morgan. The show aired from January 26 to June 1, 1951, originally from 9 p.m. to 9:30 p.m. ET and then to 9:30 p.m. to 10 p.m. ET.

== Program formats ==
Henry Morgan's Great Talent Hunt began January 26, 1951, replacing Versatile Varieties. The first format for the Morgan show was a take-off on The Original Amateur Hour with Morgan as host, and featuring Kaye Ballard (in her TV debut), Art Carney, Pert Kelton, and Arnold Stang. The program "featured people who had unusual abilities", such as a man who picked a violin's strings with his teeth and a girl who played an instrument while tap dancing.

In April, NBC changed the title and format to The Henry Morgan Show, a music-variety show featuring singers Dorothy Claire and Dorothy Jarnac in musical segments between Morgan's comedy skits. This latter format lasted until June 1.

== Production ==
Campbell Soups sponsored the program. Dick Schreiber was the director. Will Glickman and Joe Stein were the writers. It originated from WNBT.

== Critical response ==
A review of the premiere episode in The New York Times said that the program did not deliver as promised. Instead of "contestants with odd and weird talents", the review said, "Two of the acts sounded most familiar." The reviewer recalled having heard those two acts on a radio program several years earlier. The review concluded, "The 'Great Talent Hunt' is not really odd, weird or unusual."

That episode was also reviewed in the trade publication Billboard, which said that the show's premise "could lead to a lot of fun", but Morgan and others on the show "seemed to press too much". The review said that Morgan, known for his "wonderfully off-beat, sardonic and often caustic wit", tried too hard to be nice. It also noted problems in staging and said that Stang's "material was weak and served to break up the routine rather than bolster it." Excess commercialism also drew criticism, both for the number of commercials and for devices such as asking guests about their favorite soup.

== See also ==
- 1951-52 United States network television schedule

== Bibliography ==
- Alex McNeil, Total Television, Fourth edition (New York: Penguin Books, 1980) ISBN 0-14-024916-8
- Tim Brooks and Earle Marsh, The Complete Directory to Prime Time Network TV Shows, Third edition (New York: Ballantine Books, 1964) ISBN 0-345-31864-1
