= DuMont Royal Theater =

American TV dramatic anthology series (1951–1952)

- Also known as: Royal Playhouse
- Country of origin: United States

Production
- Running time: 30 minutes

Original release
- Network: DuMont
- Release: April 12, 1951 – June 26, 1952

DuMont Royal Theater (also known as Royal Playhouse) is an American dramatic anthology television series which ran on the now-defunct DuMont Television Network from April 12, 1951, to June 26, 1952. The half-hour series ran during the summers, and in 1952 it ran on alternate weeks with Gruen Playhouse.

The series helped launch the career of Hugh O'Brian, who later appeared in the popular series The Life and Legend of Wyatt Earp. Others who appeared on the program included Mary Sinclair and Edgar Barrier.

Bing Crosby Enterprises produced the program, which was also broadcast with the title Crown Theater. DuMont sponsored the series on 18 TV stations, with a variety of sponsors putting it on the air in other markets. United Television Programs was in charge of rights to reruns.

== See also ==
- List of programs broadcast by the DuMont Television Network
- List of surviving DuMont Television Network broadcasts

== Bibliography ==
- David Weinstein, The Forgotten Network: DuMont and the Birth of American Television (Philadelphia: Temple University Press, 2004) ISBN 1-59213-245-6
- Alex McNeil, Total Television, Fourth edition (New York: Penguin Books, 1980) ISBN 0-14-024916-8
- Tim Brooks and Earle Marsh, The Complete Directory to Prime Time Network TV Shows, Third edition (New York: Ballantine Books, 1964) ISBN 0-345-31864-1
