= Winged Victory (film) =

1944 film by George Cukor

- Theatrical release poster
- Directed by: George Cukor
- Screenplay by: Moss Hart
- Based on: Winged Victory by Moss Hart
- Produced by: Darryl F. Zanuck
- Starring: Lon McCallister; Jeanne Crain; Edmond O'Brien; Jane Ball; Mark Daniels; Jo-Carroll Dennison; Don Taylor; Judy Holliday; Lee J. Cobb; Peter Lind Hayes; Alan Baxter
- Cinematography: Glen MacWilliams
- Edited by: Barbara McLean
- Music by: David Rose; Leonard De Paur
- Production companies: 20th Century-Fox; U.S. Army Air Forces
- Distributed by: 20th Century-Fox
- Release date: December 22, 1944
- Running time: 130 minutes
- Country: United States
- Language: English
- Box office: $2.93 million (U.S. and Canada rentals)

Winged Victory is a 1944 American war drama film directed by George Cukor, a joint effort of 20th Century-Fox and the U.S. Army Air Forces. Based upon the 1943 play of the same name by Moss Hart, who also wrote the screenplay, the film opened only after the play's theatre run. The film version of Winged Victory used many of the Broadway cast, who were brought to Hollywood.

== Plot ==
Frankie Davis, Allan Ross, and "Pinky" Scariano join the U.S. Army Air Forces with hopes of becoming pilots. In training, they befriend Irving Miller and Bobby Crills. The five friends go through the training process to become pilots, facing success, failure, and tragedy.

Allan, newly married, finds that wife Dorothy plans to go with him to aviation school. Frankie, whose hometown bride Jane is living with Dorothy near the camp, watches with concern as some of the other cadets receive "wash-out tickets". For now, he is safe.

Pinky washes out when he fails his eye test, but is classified a gunner and ships out for separate training. Frankie, Allan and their friends, Irving and Bobby are assigned to pilot training. During the cadets' first night flight, Frankie crashes. His friends are devastated. Allan volunteers to give the tragic news to Jane, who is expecting their first child.

When the group wins their wings and are assigned to their units, Pinky is assigned to the same aircraft flown by Allan and Irving, and together with their five crew mates, they name their craft "Winged Victory." The next assignment is to join the fighting in the South Pacific, but before leaving they see their wives in San Francisco. In spite of trying to keep their assignment secret, the women guess their husbands are going to go into combat.

At their South Pacific base in New Guinea, the exhausted crew of the "Winged Victory" join the other crews in a Christmas celebration. In the midst of the festivities, an air raid siren sounds, and they take off for battle. During the fight, a tire on the "Winged Victory" is damaged during combat, and Pinky is wounded. After the aircraft makes a rough but safe landing at the base, Pinky is rushed away in an ambulance.

Back at the base, Allan learns that his wife has given birth to a son. Before taking off to rejoin the air battle, he writes a letter to his son, explaining the importance of his mission and his hopes for the future.

== Cast ==
- Lon McCallister as Frankie Davis
- Jeanne Crain as Helen
- Edmond O'Brien as Irving Miller
- Jane Ball as Jane Preston
- Mark Daniels as Alan Ross
- Jo-Carroll Dennison as Dorothy Ross
- Don Taylor as Danny "Pinky" Scariano
- Judy Holliday as Ruth Miller
- Lee J. Cobb as Doctor
- Peter Lind Hayes as O'Brien
- Alan Baxter as Major Halper
- Red Buttons as "Whitey"/Andrews Sister (Note: Along with Corporal Buttons, other members of the USAAF who were in the film included Sergeant Edmond O'Brien and Corporal Lee J. Cobb.)
- Barry Nelson as Bobby Crills
- Rune Hultman as Dave Anderson
- Gary Merrill as Capt. McIntyre
- George Reeves as Lt. Thompson

== Production ==
Fox bought the film rights for $350,000.

Winged Victory entered principal photography on June 15, 1944, and wrapped production on September 25, 1944. The United States Army Air Forces provided 14 technical advisers to the production company. The advisers were able to provide information on training, graduation exercises and even combat experience. Included in the group of pilots was a chaplain and flight surgeon.

The aircraft seen in Winged Victory include 27 Consolidated B-24J Liberator bombers featured in the combat scenes and 55 Vultee BT-13A Valiant as well as numerous Cessna AT-17 Bobcat trainers. A number of Curtiss P-40N Warhawk fighters were also seen.

== Reception ==
Winged Victory was critically reviewed by Bosley Crowther in The New York Times. He enthusiastically praised the film ("lurid adventure episodes" in the story) and commented: "The Army Air Force show, 'Winged Victory,' which was a big and deserving hit upon the stage, has now been transposed into the medium which was most appropriate to it all the time—the large-scale and swiftly fluid medium of the motion picture screen. And, as it looked yesterday at the Roxy, where it opened amid a rout of brass and pomp, it gives every promise of being one of the most successful films about this war."

The review in Variety was similarly effusive about Winged Victory: "This is no story of any specific segment of Americana; it is, rather, the tale of Main Street and Broadway, of Texas and Brooklyn, of Christian and Jew—of American youth fighting for the preservation of American ideals. This is a documentation of American youth learning to fly for victory—a winged victory—and though it's fashioned in the manner of fictional entertainment, all the boys listed are bona fide members of the AAF—acting real-life roles."
