= Jane Ball =

American actress (1920–2005)

- Born: October 4, 1920; Kingston, New York
- Died: December 9, 2005 (aged 85); Pennsylvania
- Occupation: Actress
- Years active: 1940s
- Spouse: Monte Proser
- Children: 5

Jane Ball was an American film actress. She appeared in several Hollywood films during the 1940s, most notably in supporting roles at 20th Century-Fox.

== Early life ==
Jane Ball was born on October 4, 1920, in Kingston, New York. Details about her early life and education remain scarce in available records.

== Career ==
Ball began her acting career in 1944 with the role of Nora Bannon as an adult in the film The Keys of the Kingdom, starring Gregory Peck. That same year, she appeared in Winged Victory, playing the character Jane Preston. Following a three-year hiatus, she returned to the screen in 1947 with a role in Forever Amber as Corinne Carlton.

Her film career was brief, comprising only these three feature films. In 1952, she made a single television appearance in an episode of the TV series Gruen Guild Playhouse, after which she retired from acting to become a nurse.

== Filmography ==
- The Keys of the Kingdom (1944) as Nora Bannon (adult)
- Winged Victory (1944) as Jane Preston
- Forever Amber (1947) as Corinne Carlton
- Gruen Guild Playhouse (1952) (1 episode)

== Personal life ==
Ball was married to Monte Proser, a night club owner. According to one source, the couple married in 1945 and had five children together; Proser died in 1973.

== Death ==
Jane Ball died on December 9, 2005, in Pennsylvania, at the age of 85.
