= Shadow of the Cloak =

US live spy drama television series

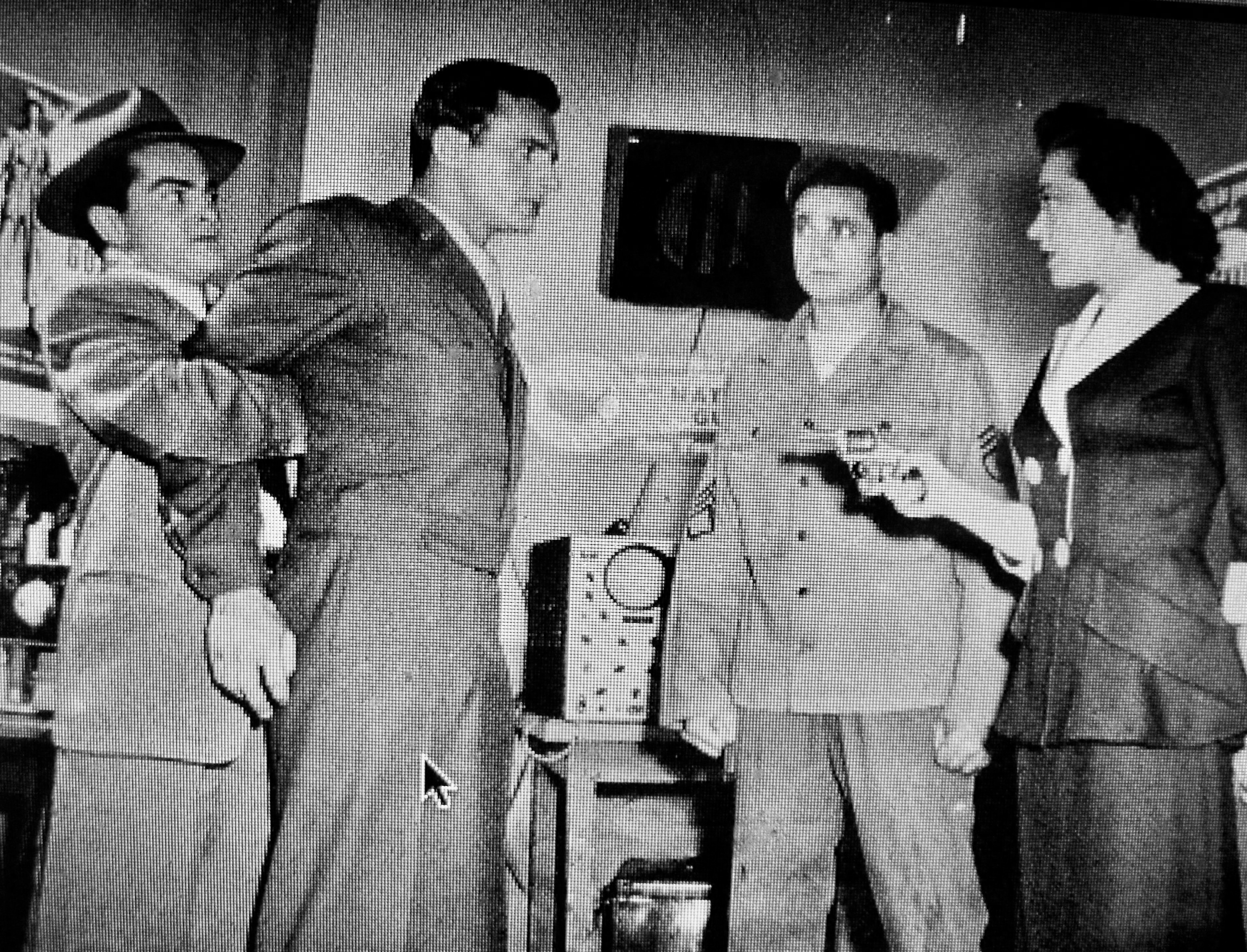
- Publicity shot
- Starring: Helmut Dantine
- Country of origin: United States
- No. of episodes: 36

Production
- Producer: Roger Gerry
- Running time: 30 minutes

Original release
- Network: DuMont
- Release: June 6, 1951 – March 20, 1952

Shadow of the Cloak is an American spy drama television series broadcast on the DuMont Television Network. Helmut Dantine played secret agent Peter House.

The first episode aired on June 6, 1951, and the last episode on March 20, 1952. The 30-minute show aired on Wednesdays at 9:30 p.m. ET through November 1951, then Thursdays at 9 p.m. ET from December until March 20, 1952. From January 1952 until the end of the run, Shadow of the Cloak alternated with Gruen Playhouse.

== Production ==
Roger Gerry was the supervisory producer, and Dick Sandwick was the director. Writers included Virginia and Lawrence Dugan and John Gay.

== Preservation status ==
One episode, "The Last Performance" (aired January 10, 1952), written by Rod Serling, is known to have survived.

== See also ==
- List of programs broadcast by the DuMont Television Network
- List of surviving DuMont Television Network broadcasts
- 1951–52 United States network television schedule

== General bibliography ==
- Weinstein, David. The Forgotten Network: DuMont and the Birth of American Television (Philadelphia: Temple University Press, 2004) ISBN 1-59213-245-6
