= Cosmopolitan Theatre =

American TV dramatic anthology series (1951)

- Genre: Anthology
- Directed by: David Pressman; Louis G. Cowan; David Crandall; Albert McCleery
- Country of origin: United States
- Original language: English
- No. of seasons: 1
- No. of episodes: 13

Production
- Producers: Louis G. Cowan; Sherman Marks; Albert McCleery
- Camera setup: Single-camera
- Running time: 60 minutes
- Production companies: DuMont Television Network; Louis G. Cowan Productions

Original release
- Network: DuMont
- Release: October 2 – December 25, 1951

Cosmopolitan Theatre is an American anthology series which aired on the DuMont Television Network from October 2, 1951, to December 25, 1951. The combined drug companies that sponsored the series not only canceled it but relinquished the time slot, citing budgetary problems. The trade publication Variety reported that the show had "some hefty ratings" and was "one of the more qualitative" programs on DuMont.

== Synopsis ==
The series consisted of live presentations of stories written for Cosmopolitan magazine, and was one of many TV series airing "tele-plays" at the time.

== Episode status ==
The program was broadcast live. If any episodes exist, they would be in the form of kinescope recordings.

== Episodes ==
Episode #	Episode title	Original airdate	Guest star(s)
1-1	"The Secret Front"	October 2, 1951	Marsha Hunt, Kurt Katch, and Lee Tracy
1-2	"Be Just and Fear Not"	October 9, 1951	Joseph Schildkraut and June Walker
1-3	"Incident in the Blizzard"	October 16, 1951	Betty Field and E. G. Marshall
1-4	"Reward, One Million"	October 23, 1951	Dennis Hoey and Beatrice Straight
1-5	"Mr. Pratt and the Triple Horror Bill "	October 30, 1951	Constance Dowling and Tom Ewell
1-6	"Last Concerto"	November 6, 1951	Lon Chaney Jr., Susan Douglas, and Ruth McDevitt
1-7	"I'll Be Right Home, Ma"	November 13, 1951	Charles Nolte
1-8	"The Tourist"	November 20, 1951	Peggy Allenby, John Boruff, and John Hoyt
1-9	"Time to Kill"	November 27, 1951	John Forsythe, Phyllis Love, and Torin Thatcher
1-10	"The Beautiful Time"	December 4, 1951	Joseph Buloff and Lili Darvas
1-11	"Mr. Whittle and the Morning Star"	December 11, 1951	Peggy Conklin and Bramwell Fletcher
1-12	"The Sighing Sounds"	December 18, 1951	Bethel Leslie and Gordon Mills
1-13	"One Red Rose for Christmas"	December 25, 1951	Jo Van Fleet

== Production ==
Louis G. Cowan packaged Cosmopolitan Theatre; Sherman Marks was the producer and director. Writers of episodes included Richard Macauley and David Shaw.

The show replaced Cavalcade of Bands from 9 to 10 p.m. Eastern Time on Tuesdays. It originated from WABD and was carried live to 14 stations with 10 more showing it via kinescope.

== Critical response ==
In December 1951, critic John Crosby called Cosmopolitan Theatre "the Dumont network's most elaborate entry into the dramatic field". He noted that restricting the show's content to stories from the magazine "places a rather severe limit not only on the range of material but also on the type of material open to this program." He noted that the two forms of media differed greatly in the ways they affected audiences and ended the review with the comment, "TV has conditioned us to accept a much harder degree of reality than most slick fiction has ever attempted."

== See also ==
- List of programs broadcast by the DuMont Television Network
- List of surviving DuMont Television Network broadcasts
- 1951-52 United States network television schedule

== Bibliography ==
- David Weinstein, The Forgotten Network: DuMont and the Birth of American Television (Philadelphia: Temple University Press, 2004) ISBN 1-59213-245-6
