= Pentagon (TV series) =

- Country of origin: United States

Production
- Running time: 30 minutes

Original release
- Network: DuMont
- Release: May 6, 1951 – November 24, 1952

Pentagon, a.k.a. Pentagon Washington, is a public affairs TV series broadcast by the DuMont Television Network from May 6, 1951, to November 24, 1952. The series initially aired Sundays at 8:30pm ET before moving to Mondays at 8:00 pm ET in December 1951.

== Episode status ==
Only the final episode from November 24, 1952, exists. This episode is held in the J. Fred MacDonald collection at the Library of Congress.

== See also ==
- List of programs broadcast by the DuMont Television Network
- List of surviving DuMont Television Network broadcasts
- 1951-52 United States network television schedule

== Bibliography ==
- David Weinstein, The Forgotten Network: DuMont and the Birth of American Television (Philadelphia: Temple University Press, 2004) ISBN 1-59213-245-6
- Alex McNeil, Total Television, Fourth edition (New York: Penguin Books, 1980) ISBN 0-14-024916-8
- Tim Brooks and Earle Marsh, The Complete Directory to Prime Time Network and Cable TV Shows 1946–Present, Ninth edition (New York: Ballantine Books, 2007) ISBN 978-0-345-49773-4
