= Versatile Varieties =

- Genre: Variety show Children
- Created by: Charles Basch; Frances Scott
- Directed by: Mark Hawley; Jay Strong
- Presented by: George Givot; Harold Barry; Bob Russell
- Starring: Bernie Sands; Jerry Jerome; Mark Towers; Harry Breuer (bandleaders); Nick Perito (piano)
- Country of origin: United States
- Original language: English

Production
- Running time: 30 minutes

Original release
- Network: NBC (1949-51); CBS (1951); ABC (1951)
- Release: 29 August 1949 – 14 December 1951

Versatile Varieties, also known as Bonnie Maid Versatile Varieties and Bonny Maid Versatile Varieties, is a TV series that ran from 1949 to 1951 on NBC, CBS and ABC under three different formats. The sponsor was Bonnie Maid Linoleum.

== Program formats ==
- On NBC, from August 29, 1949, to January 19, 1951, on Fridays from 9pm to 9:30pm ET, was a variety show set in a nightclub, where those not performing in the various acts would be seen sitting at tables on the sidelines. Eva Marie Saint, Anne Francis, Edie Adams, and Janis Paige appeared as "Bonnie Maids", dressed in plaid kilts, hosting and doing live ads for the sponsor. Original host George Givot was replaced after two months by comedian Harold Barry, and then later by singer Bob Russell. Guest stars included Mary Small, Lon Chaney Jr., Bela Lugosi, and Peggy Ann Garner. On January 26, replaced by Henry Morgan's Great Talent Hunt, which lasted until June 1.
- On CBS, from January 28 to July 22, 1951, a Sunday morning children's TV show hosted by Lady Iris Mountbatten called Versatile Varieties, Junior Edition.
- On ABC, from September 21, 1951, to December 14, 1951, seven episodes were aired Fridays 9:30 to 10pm ET, alternating with sci-fi anthology Tales of Tomorrow.

== Personnel ==
Mark Hawley was the director. Merrill Joels was the announcer.

== Critical response ==
A review in the trade publication Billboard said that the program's production values were "a little better than most similar" shows, while the children's performances were much the same: "Some of them appealing, some just a shade short of monstrous."

== See also ==
- 1949-50 United States network television schedule
- 1950-51 United States network television schedule
- 1951-52 United States network television schedule

== Bibliography ==
- Alex McNeil, Total Television, Fourth edition (New York: Penguin Books, 1980) ISBN 0-14-024916-8
- Tim Brooks and Earle Marsh, The Complete Directory to Prime Time Network TV Shows, Third edition (New York: Ballantine Books, 1964) ISBN 0-345-31864-1
