= Earl Wilson (columnist) =

American journalist (1907–1987)

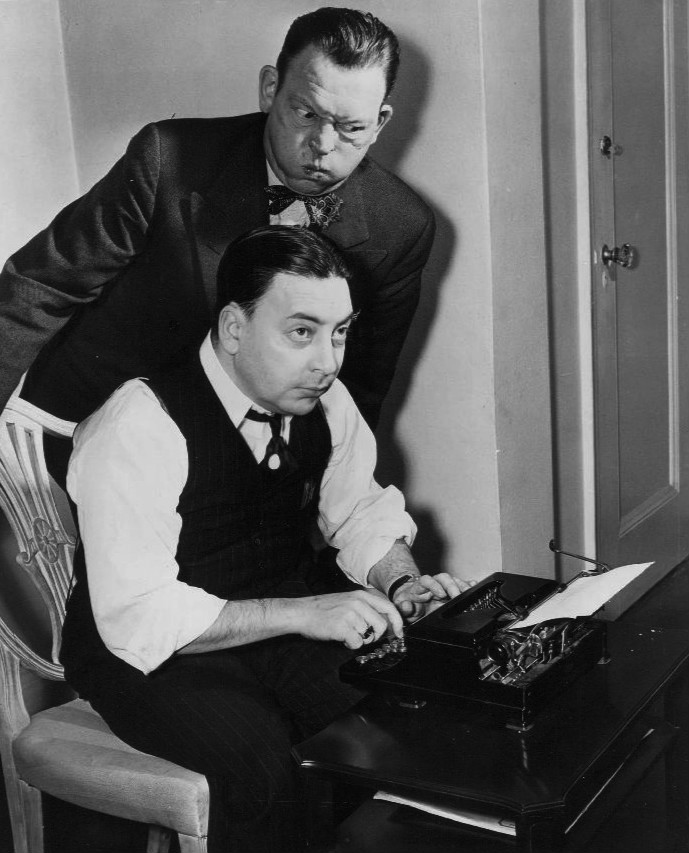
- Wilson (seated) with comedian Fred Allen, 1949
- Born: Harvey Earl Wilson; May 3, 1907; Rockford, Ohio, U.S.
- Died: January 16, 1987 (aged 79); Yonkers, New York, U.S.
- Occupations: Journalist and author

Harvey Earl Wilson (May 3, 1907 – January 16, 1987) was an American journalist, gossip columnist, and author, perhaps best known for his 6-day a week nationally syndicated newspaper column, It Happened Last Night.

== Early life and career ==
Harvey Earl Wilson was born in Rockford, in Mercer County in western Ohio, to Arthur Wilson, a farmer, and Chloe Huffman Wilson. He attended Central High, where he reported on the doings of the school, using his father's typewriter to write his stories. Young Earl's mother encouraged him to pursue a career outside of farming. Wilson contributed to the Rockford Press and the Lima Republican Gazette, which would be the first to pay him for his writing. He also wrote for the Piqua, Ohio Daily Call before enrolling in college in 1925. Wilson attended Heidelberg College for two years before transferring to Ohio State University, where he worked on The Lantern, the university's student-run daily newspaper. He also held part-time jobs with the Columbus Dispatch and the capital city's International News Service Bureau. Wilson graduated from Ohio State University in 1931 with a B.S. in journalism.

In 1935, Wilson began work for The Washington Post, meanwhile sending samples of his work to one of the editors at the New York Post. Later in 1935, Wilson arrived in New York to begin work with the Post, taking a room in a boarding house on Bleecker Street. There he met Rosemary Lyons from East St. Louis, IL, a secretary whom he wed in 1936. The couple struggled for several years until Wilson's work at the Post began to take off.

Their only child, Earl Wilson Jr., was born on December 1, 1942. His column, which he took over from a writer who went off to war in 1942, was originally considered "filler". It eventually ran until 1983. As the column grew in popularity and importance, Wilson worked 18-hour days, typically arising in the late morning, telephoning news sources, and taking reports from several assistants. In the evenings he would set out for dinner at Toots Shor's or a similar theater district restaurant, accompanied by his wife, Rosemary, known to his readers as "B.W." (originally short for Barefoot Wife but when she objected he changed it to Beautiful Wife). The pair made the rounds of night spots until the wee hours of the morning.

=== Radio ===
Wilson had a radio program that debuted on January 7, 1945, on the Mutual Broadcasting System. His guest on the premiere episode was Tallulah Bankhead. He also had talk shows on local stations.

=== Broadway coverage ===
By the early 1950s, the Broadway gossip columns had become an important media outlet. Columnists exercised a great deal of power in providing publicity for the celebrities of the day. But whereas gossip columnists as a group were not held in high regard, Wilson had the reputation of being different: he was a trained journalist who double-checked facts; he was much influenced by his Mid-western upbringing, avoiding innuendo and sensationalism; and he sought to cover his stories as real news items. With a reputation for being fair and honest, Wilson was trusted so much that celebrities willingly gave him their stories.

His chronicling of the Broadway theatre scene during the "Golden Age" of show business formed the basis for a book published in 1971, The Show Business Nobody Knows. For most of its run, his column was titled "It Happened Last Night." By the 1960s, the column ran in 175 newspapers nationwide. He signed his columns with the tag line, "That's Earl, brother." His nickname was "Midnight Earl". In later years, the name of his column was changed to Last Nite With Earl Wilson. In his final years with the Post, he alternated with the paper's entertainment writer and restaurant critic, Martin Burden, in turning out the column. (Burden, who died in 1993, took over the Last Night column full-time upon Wilson's retirement.)

Wilson is also the author of three books, Show Business Laid Bare, and an unauthorized biography of Frank Sinatra, Sinatra: An Unauthorized Biography. The former book is notable for revealing the extramarital affairs of President John F. Kennedy; Also, "I Am Gazing Into My 8 Ball", a collection of his NY Post columns "It Happened Last Night" which ran for 41 years, from 1942 to 1983. (1948, Pocket Books.)

=== Appearances on television and in films ===
In the early 1950s, Wilson was an occasional panelist on the NBC game show Who Said That?

On January 19, 1952, Wilson guest-starred on the CBS live variety show Faye Emerson's Wonderful Town, in which hostess Faye Emerson visited Columbus to accent the kinds of music popular in the Ohio capital city.

Wilson appeared in a few films as himself, notably Copacabana (1947) with Groucho Marx and Carmen Miranda, A Face in the Crowd (1957) with Andy Griffith, College Confidential (1960), Beach Blanket Bingo (1965) with Buster Keaton, Paul Lynde and Don Rickles, and Where Were You When the Lights Went Out? (1968) with Doris Day. Wilson also hosted the DuMont TV show Stage Entrance from May 1951 to March 1952.

== Death ==
Wilson, at age 79, died at St. Joseph's Hospital in Yonkers, New York on January 16, 1987. Having battled Parkinson's disease for several years, he suffered a stroke approximately six days earlier.

He was survived by his only child, Earl Wilson Jr., a songwriter for the musical theatre. Wilson Sr.'s wife, Rosemary, predeceased him February 23, 1986.

== Legacy ==
- Ed Sullivan dedicated The Beatles first set on the Ed Sullivan Show to Johnny Carson, Randy Paar and Earl Wilson.
- Wilson was portrayed by Christian McKay in the 2016 film Florence Foster Jenkins.
