= Roberta Quinlan =

American musician

Roberta Quinlan (born Roberta Englemeier) is an American musician.

== Early years ==
Quinlan was born Roberta Englemeier, the daughter of Mr. and Mrs. Alfred A. Engelmeier, in St. Louis, Missouri. When she was a little girl, an operation on her tonsils lowered the pitch of her voice, and she focused her musical attention on piano lessons. She majored in music at Washington University in St. Louis.

In 1937, doing a favor for a friend resulted in a career opportunity for Quinlan. A St. Louis radio station held a contest to select a vocalist for a program, and Quinlan went to play piano for a singing friend in her audition. At the contest director's urging, Quinlan also sang, accompanying herself at the piano. Quinlan won the competition, and her career was about to begin.

== Career ==
Quinlan was a singer at the Chase Club in St. Louis when the singer for a visiting orchestra got sick. Quinlan filled in for her, and Will Osborne, the bandleader, took Quinlan to New York when the band ended its stay at the Chase. She later sang for a band led by Mitchell Ayres.

During World War II Quinlan performed for American military personnel in the United States and overseas. However, after she married in 1946, she put career plans aside and said, "Henceforth I will be a housewife and happy in the role. Good-by, show business." A change in her husband's job took the couple to England to live. While Quinlan was a guest at a party in London, the hostess asked her to play the piano and sing. Afterward, a British Broadcasting Corporation (BBC) executive who was at the party asked her to perform on television for the BBC. That invitation led to her becoming mistress of ceremonies and singing on a weekly BBC-TV variety program.

Quinlan gained a program on NBC-TV after she and her husband returned to the United States. In April 1948, she began Musical Miniatures on the network. That program was succeeded by The Roberta Quinlan Show, which had one fan whose interest determined the next phase of her career. That fan was vice-president of Mohawk Carpet Mills, and soon the Mohawk Showroom debuted on NBC-TV in May 1949. It was broadcast five nights a week, with Morton Downey starring on three nights and Quinlan starring on two. Downey left the program on December 9, 1949, and Quinlan moved into the thrice-weekly schedule. Quinlan's appearance on the show was enhanced by various jewels that on one episode had a value of $250,000, with armed guards present. A newspaper article reported that jeweler Harry Winston "likes to see her sparkle with gems". Quinlan's performances on the program led to her winning the Favorite Woman TV Singer Award from Radio Television Mirror magazine for 1950. Her success on the TV program pleased Mohawk executives enough that they created a radio program for her. In 1960, Quinlan had another TV program, Songshop.

Quinlan was a guest on TV shows of Steve Allen, Jackie Gleason, Guy Lombardo, Ken Murray and Johnny Carson, and she was featured in more than 40 cerebral palsy telethons across the United States.

Quinlan's recordings included "Buffalo Billy", Molasses, Molasses", and "You Wonderful You" in 1950 and "Any Old Time" and "The Unbirthday Song" in 1951. In 1969, she recorded "Merry Go Round of Love", which initially was released only for play in jukeboxes. She was named Jukebox Queen of 1969.

== Personal life ==
Quinlan married Jack Quinlan, an aircraft company executive who later became a Wall Street broker, on February 16, 1946, in Wilkes-Barre, Pennsylvania. They were divorced on May 19, 1953, in St. Louis.
