= Ford Festival =

- Also known as: The James Melton Show
- Genre: Variety
- Presented by: James Melton
- Theme music composer: Lewis Allan; David Broekman
- Country of origin: United States
- Original language: English
- No. of seasons: 1
- No. of episodes: 65

Production
- Executive producers: Charles Friedman; Albert McCleery
- Camera setup: Multi-camera
- Running time: 60 minutes

Original release
- Network: NBC Television
- Release: 5 April 1951 – 26 June 1952

Ford Festival, also known as The James Melton Show, is an hour-long television show, sponsored by Ford Motor Company, hosted by James Melton, and broadcast on NBC Television beginning on April 5, 1951. The final show was aired June 26, 1952. This show was replaced by another Ford-sponsored NBC show, Ford Television Theatre, from October 1952 to September 1956.

The initial premise of the program was that each episode had a plot that tied together performances by Melton and other performers, including singer Dorothy Warenskjold, comedienne Vera Vague, and comedic singers the Wiere Brothers. Effective June 7, 1951, the format changed to a traditional revue. The Wiere Brothers were dropped, and Billy Barty joined the group.

The show aired:

- April 5, 1951 – December 27, 1951, Thursdays 9:00-10:00 p.m. ET
- January 3, 1952 – June 26, 1952, Thursdays 9:30-10:30 p.m. ET

== Guest stars ==
Guest stars on the program included

- Carl Ballantine
- Sarah Churchill
- Rosemary Clooney
- Peter Lorre
- Diana Lynn
- Jan Murray
- ZaSu Pitts

== Critical response ==
Jack Gould, in a review of the premiere episode in The New York Times, wrote Melton performed well as a singer, but "he was at a rather decided disadvantage" when he had to narrate, deliver commercials, and perform other than singing. Gould described the format as "extraordinarily pedestrian", pointing out flaws in the script and in production interludes. He added that direction of the episode seemed suited more to stage than to TV.

== See also ==
- 1951-52 United States network television schedule
- For other TV series sponsored by Ford Motor Company, see Ford Television Theatre, Ford Startime, The Ford Show, and Ford Star Jubilee.
