= We Take Your Word =

American radio program

- Country of origin: United States
- Language: English
- TV adaptations: We Take Your Word
- Hosted by: Don Hollenbeck; John K. M. McCaffrey
- Starring: Lyman Bryson; Abe Burrows
- Produced by: Werner Michel; Sam Abelow
- Original release: January 29, 1950
- Sponsored by: Sustaining

We Take Your Word is an American radio program that was broadcast on CBS beginning January 29, 1950. It was also adapted into a television version.

== Format ==
Members of a panel provided "definitions, derivations and histories" of words submitted by members of the broadcast audience. Each person who submitted a word that was used on the program received a book; if the panel failed to define the word correctly, the submitter also received $50. Panelists' comments were not classified as right or wrong, but when the panel discussion concluded, a "Voice of Authority" spoke to give the correct information. Words that were discussed on the program included "gardenia", "glamour", "democracy", "republic", "typhoon", "dandelion", "daisly", "ceremony", "cupola", "dome", "fanfare", "parapet", and "salvo".

== Radio ==
Don Hollenbeck was the initial host; John K. M. McCaffrey replaced him beginning on February 19, 1950. in hopes that "McCaffrey's personality would make the program a commercial success." Regular panelists were Lyman Bryson and Abe Burrows. Guest panelists included Vicki Cummings, Cornelia Otis Skinner, Faye Emerson and Eva Le Gallienne. Producers included Werner Michel and Sam Abelow. The show was sustaining.

Use of We Take Your Word extended beyond entertainment. The magazine Educational Screen reported on a high school that used a wire recorder to preserve episodes of it and other programs for use in high-school classes "to stimulate vocabulary building and word study".

=== Critical response ===
The trade publication Billboard wrote, after the show's first anniversary, that it "continues to blend education plus entertainment in a manner which should make for many such more anniversaries." The reviewer added, "This program certainly proves that entertainment can be combined with education."

Media critic John Crosby wrote, "At its best it's one of the wittiest programs anywhere on the air." He described the program as "witty, literate, extremely learned, educational in the best sense, and a lot of fun to listen to."

The trade publication Variety called We Take Your Word "an adult show that is erudite, but with an informal air far removed from the stuffiness of a classroom. In fact, it had as many laughs as some comedy stanzas." The review commended the "well-balanced panel" and Hollenbeck's "relaxed quizmastering".

== Television ==
An experimental television version of We Take Your Word debuted on April 1, 1950, with McCaffrey as wordmaster. It ended that month. The program returned on June 9, 1950, with John Daly as wordmaster and ran through January 23, 1951. It resumed in March 1951 with McCaffrey as wordmaster and ended June 1, 1951. Panelists included Bryson, Burrows, and Ilka Chase. Guest panelists included Jan Struther, Nina Foch, and Richard Carlson. Gil Fates was the producer, and Fred Rickey was the director. The program originated from WCBS-TV.

=== Critical response ===
A review in Billboard called We Take Your Word "the last word in intelligent video entertainment". It complimented McCaffery's work as moderator and Burrows's and Foch's performances as panelists.
