= Mohawk Showroom =

American musical television program

- Country of origin: United States

Original release
- Network: NBC
- Release: May 2, 1949

Mohawk Showroom is an American musical television program that debuted on NBC on May 2, 1949 and ended on November 23, 1951. It was sponsored by Mohawk Carpet Mills Inc. In 1951, the program was one of several NBC-TV shows selected to be shown to United States military personnel overseas via kinescope recordings. The same title was also used for a similar radio program in 1951.

== Overview ==
Morton Downey and Roberta Quinlan initially shared hosting duties on the 15-minute program, Carmen Mastren and The Chieftains provided music, and Bob Stanton was the announcer. Downey starred on Mondays, Wednesdays, and Fridays, and Quinlan was the star on Tuesdays and Thursdays. Because of the alternating hosts, the series was sometimes referred to as The Morton Downey Show and The Roberta Quinlan Show. Downey left the show after the December 9, 1949, episode, and Quinlan became featured on each episode. At some point the Tuesday and Thursday segments were dropped, with broadcasts continuing at 7:30 p. m. Eastern Time on Mondays, Wednesdays, and Fridays. Each of the program's episodes had a theme (such as marriage or graduation) to which all of its songs related. Commercials were also tailored to the theme as much as possible.

Guests on the show included Eddie Peabody.

== Production ==
Roger Muir was the producer; Clark Jones and Doug Rodgers were the directors. The show originated from WNBT.

== Critical reception ==
A review of Downey's show in The New York Times said that most episodes of the show provided "a program with both pace and variety". The review complimented Downey's performance but said that he should not "try to incorporate too much extraneous 'business'", because he came across better with a more relaxed approach.

In September 1951, a review in the trade publication Billboard complimented Quinlan's performance and the show's visual presentation. It called the program "one of the really pleasant little musical quarter hours in television".

== Radio version ==
Spurred by the success of its TV program, in the spring of 1951, Mohawk began a radio version, also titled Mohawk Showroom. Sponsor magazine reported, "The spot radio effort has grown partially out of the desire of dealers in non-TV markets for support like that furnished their brethren in TV territory via the Mohawk Showroom". Quinlan starred in the radio version, which was 15 minutes long and ran three days per week. It initially ran for 13 weeks in 26 markets with plans for a second 13-week series in the fall of 1951 along with hopes for increasing the number of markets.
