= Police Story (1952 TV series) =

American television series

Police Story is a 30-minute American television anthology series that aired on CBS from April 4, 1952, to September 26, 1952. Twenty-four episodes were produced live in New York City. The scripts consisted of dramatic incidents drawn from actual police files from around the country, plus there were episodes about crime prevention. Actors included Edward Binns, E. G. Marshall, and James Gregory. The series was narrated by Norman Rose, who had also narrated the 1954–1955 season of The Big Story.
