= Georgetown University Forum =

- Presented by: Frank Blair (1950s); Lillian Brown (1970s–2009); Carole Sargent (2009–2016); Evan Barba and J.R. Osborn (2016–2019); Carole Sargent (2020–present)
- Country of origin: United States

Production
- Running time: 28 mins.

Original release
- Network: DuMont (1951–1953); NPR (1970s–present); Armed Forces Radio
- Release: July 3, 1951 – October 11, 1953 (television). Ongoing since 1953 as a radio program

Georgetown University Forum is an American radio talk show. It is uploaded weekly to the Public Radio Satellite System as free content for National Public Radio member stations, with additional availability to Armed Forces Radio and Voice of America. It has existed since 1947, and in the 1950s was briefly a television program on now-defunct DuMont Television Network.

== Radio history ==
The first airdate was in 1947. Beginning in the mid-1970s it was hosted by Lillian Brown, a presidential makeup artist who had worked with every president from Eisenhower to Clinton. From 2009 to 2016 it was produced and hosted by Carole Sargent, the Director of the Office of Scholarly Publications who had previously been a faculty member in the English department. From 2016-2019 it was produced and hosted by Evan Barba and J.R. Osborn, both professors in the Communication, Culture, and Technology program at Georgetown University. In 2019 Sargent returned as producer and host, with continued production and content from Barba and Osborn, and Timothy Casey (C'07).

== Television broadcast history ==
The series aired on Thursdays at 8pm ET from July 3, 1951. Beginning with the 1952 season, the series aired Sundays at 7pm ET. The show was a public affairs program hosted by Frank Blair, later a newscaster on NBC. The last show aired October 11, 1953.

The television version of the show, produced at Georgetown University in Washington, DC and distributed by DuMont, aired weekly. Most of the topics were political or related to current news events. When the series was cancelled in 1953, DuMont replaced the series with local (non-network) programming.

== Radio episode status ==
The radio archive is at the Gelardin New Media Center of Lauinger Library at Georgetown University. The program is currently produced by the Director of the Office of Scholarly Publications (part of the Office of the Provost), and two professors in the Communication, Culture, and Technology program.

== Television episode status ==
A single kinescope of the series survives at the UCLA Film and Television Archive.

== See also ==
- List of programs broadcast by the DuMont Television Network
- List of surviving DuMont Television Network broadcasts
- 1951-52 United States network television schedule
- 1952-53 United States network television schedule

== Bibliography ==
- David Weinstein, The Forgotten Network: DuMont and the Birth of American Television (Philadelphia: Temple University Press, 2004) ISBN 1-59213-245-6
- Alex McNeil, Total Television, Fourth edition (New York: Penguin Books, 1980) ISBN 0-14-024916-8
- Tim Brooks and Earle Marsh, The Complete Directory to Prime Time Network and Cable TV Shows 1946–Present, Ninth edition (New York: Ballantine Books, 2007) ISBN 978-0-345-49773-4
