= Who's Whose =

US television program

- Genre: Panel show
- Directed by: Alexander Leftwich
- Presented by: Phil Baker
- Country of origin: United States
- Original language: English
- No. of seasons: 1
- No. of episodes: 1

Production
- Producer: Lester Lewis
- Production locations: New York City, New York
- Running time: 30 minutes

Original release
- Network: CBS
- Release: June 25, 1951

Related
- The Goldbergs; It's News to Me

Who's Whose is a panel quiz television game show that ran on the Columbia Broadcasting System (CBS) television network. It premiered as a TV series on June 25, 1951, and is noted for being one of the first television series to be dropped after one episode.

== Host and panelists ==
Who's Whose was hosted by long-time comedian and radio game show host Phil Baker. His on-air assistant was a man in a turban, dubbed "Gunga". The three regular celebrity panelists for the show were Robin Chandler, Art Ford, and Basil Davenport. They were joined by guest celebrity panelist Emily Kimbrough. The show was broadcast live and a kinescope was produced for stations that aired it on a delayed basis.

== Game play ==
A round began with the "panel of experts" facing a group of either three men or three women. Through questioning, the panel tried to determine which of the three was the spouse of the person sitting with Phil Baker. In an additional separate round, the panel attempted to pick out the spouse of a noted celebrity.

== Background ==
Who's Whose was brought in to replace The Goldbergs, which was dropped by its sponsor (General Foods) when its creator Gertrude Berg refused to fire the blacklisted actor Philip Loeb. The last episode of The Goldbergs ran on June 18, 1951. The official explanation given by the sponsor for dropping the show was that it was for "economy reasons". Who's Whose was slated to run in The Goldbergs' old timeslot during the summer and then be replaced in the fall.

== Audition show (pilot) ==
The concept for Who's Whose was tested in May 1951. An audition show (nowadays known as a pilot) was produced, but it was created in a unique, cost-saving way. The sound from the test program was recorded on audiotape in a radio studio, while the visuals were recorded by taking a series of still camera photographs of the proceedings. The show's concept was then demonstrated by playing back the audio while flipping through the still photos. This technique was dubbed a "two-bit kine". After the show was sold to CBS, a standard kinescope was produced to further develop the concept of the show.

== Packaging and sponsorship ==
Who's Whose was brought into existence as a "package" deal by the advertising agency Young & Rubicam (Y&R). Packaging was the common practice dating back to the days of network radio, whereby an outside entity such as an advertising agency would assemble the various production elements, including a commercial sponsor, which are needed to bring about a show. The proposed show would then be presented to a network as a "complete package". (The similar concept of movie packaging is still fairly common.) Actual production of the show was handled by independent packager Lester Lewis.

General Foods picked up sponsorship of the show in order to advertise its Sanka coffee brand, which it was already selling on The Goldbergs. General Foods was able to place the show in the same timeslot as The Goldbergs because it basically "controlled" the timeslot in which the show ran, namely Mondays from 9:30 to 10:00 pm Eastern Time on CBS-TV. This was also a common practice which also dated back to the days of network radio, where a single sponsor would pay the full costs for a certain timeslot and thus be given a great deal of leeway in determining what ran during that period. Today, rising commercial rates have made this practice usually too expensive for any one sponsor to afford (in any event, regulations following the 1950s quiz show scandals discouraged networks from ceding that much power to advertisers).

== Critical response, cancellation and aftermath ==
The reaction to the Who's Whose was decidedly negative; it was lambasted by critics as the worst television show produced to date. It was described at the time as "one of the most poorly produced TV shows yet to hit our living room screen" and "a miserable flop". Rex Lardner, columnist for The New York Times Book Review, wrote that the show was "the worst ever to hit television" and called for the return of The Goldbergs. Reviews reported that the program was lacking in production, that the four panelists played the game poorly, and emcee Phil Baker was uncomfortable and clumsy. Not only did the panelists fail to correctly identify the wife of the famous celebrity, baseball player Dizzy Dean, but Dizzy Dean himself caused additional consternation for the staff when he disappeared while backstage awaiting his appearance. Fortunately they discovered that he had wandered off with an employee to listen to a Yankees-Dodgers baseball game on the radio. Just days after its premiere the series was canceled and replaced by a new panel quiz series, It's News to Me, with General Foods (and Sanka) remaining as the sponsor in the timeslot. Phil Baker, who had signed a contract to receive $1000 a week, was paid off to conclude the contract.

Young & Rubicam's long-term reputation for successfully "packaging" shows was damaged by the Who's Whose debacle. This failure, along with a number of other recent disappointments and failures, was followed by reports in August that the agency was likely getting out of the business of packaging radio and television shows, and that high-ranking people would be leaving the agency.
