= Cavalcade of Bands (TV series) =

1950s American television series

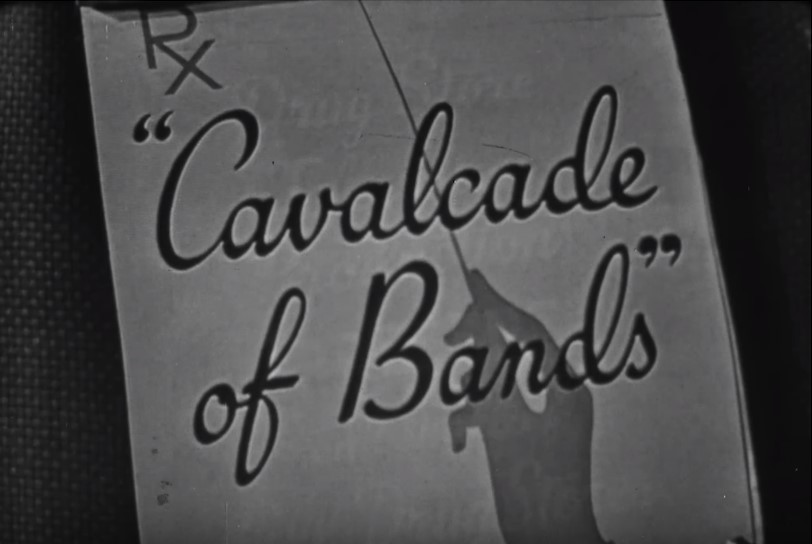
- Title card
- Starring: Fred Robbins; Warren Hull; Ted Steele; Buddy Rogers
- Country of origin: United States
- Original language: English

Production
- Running time: 60 minutes

Original release
- Network: DuMont
- Release: January 17, 1950 – September 25, 1951

Cavalcade of Bands is an early 1950s American television series which aired on the now defunct DuMont Television Network.

== Broadcast history ==
Produced by Drug Store Television Productions and DuMont, Cavalcade of Bands featured performances by popular and obscure Big Band orchestras, and aired on Tuesdays from 9-10pm ET beginning on January 17, 1950.

The series was a spin-off of DuMont's popular Cavalcade of Stars. The initial host was Fred Robbins. Although he had been publicized as "permanent master of ceremonies", he was replaced on January 24, 1950, by Warren Hull. Ted Steele, and Buddy Rogers became hosts later in the program's run. Cavalcade of Bands was a major television effort, and was designed to lure away NBC's audience after The Milton Berle Show.

The last episode of the series aired on September 25, 1951. It was replaced by "Cosmopolitan Theatre".

== Critical reception ==
A review in the trade publication Billboard described Cavalcade of Bands as "pure vaude[ville]". It noted that the sequence of acts and the way they were introduced essentially followed vaudeville style. The review added that the show's success depended on how attractive an episode's band and guest stars were, adding that in the episode reviewed, nothing that the guests did "was particularly distinguished". It concluded with the comment, "only name guests of major caliber will build an audience for the show".

== Episode guide ==
Note: Episodes aired in California via Kinescope several weeks after airing live on the east coast. All information has been gathered from newspapers of the time period in New York, New Jersey, Pittsburgh and California. This list is not meant to be complete; it is based on what information was available.

1. January 17, 1950: Guy Lombardo and his Orchestra, Borah Minnevitch Rascals, Kitty Kallen, Dancing Dunhills, Trixie (juggler), Patricia Bright (This episode exists at the Paley Center in NYC)
2. January 24, 1950: Tex Beneke and his Orchestra, Glenn Douglas, Buddy Yeager, Bob Mitchell and the Moonlight Serenaders, Rosalind Courtright, Beatrice Kraft Dancers, Rolly Rolls, The Four Evans, Frank Marlowe
3. January 31, 1950: Gene Krupa and his Orchestra (vocal, Frances Lynn. Featured soloists: tenor sax, Buddy Wise; bass, Don Simpson; trombone, Urbie Green), Monica Lewis, Rudy Cardenas, Park and Clifford, Ficcardi and Brenda, Dave Barry
4. February 7, 1950: Xavier Cugat and his Orchestra, Victor Borge, The Edwards Brothers, Tato and Julia, Robert Merrill, Jack Leonard
5. February 14, 1950: Charlie Spivak and his Orchestra, Vivian Blaine, others
6. February 21, 1950: Jimmy Dorsey and his Orchestra, The Amazing Mr. (Carl) Ballantine, Fred and Susan Barry, Tim Herbert and Don Saxon, The Dancing Dunhills
7. February 28, 1950: Skitch Henderson and his Orchestra (vocal, Gregg Lawrence), Knobby Lee, Ed Zandy, “Moose” Anderson (The Brass Wizards), Thelma Carpenter, Harold and Lola, The Edwards Brothers, Nip Nelson
8. March 7, 1950: Eddie Duchin and his Orchestra, Constance Moore, Howard and Wanda Dell, George de Witt, (Bob)Fosse and Niles, Fred Sanborn
9. March 14, 1950: Lionel Hampton and his Orchestra, Kitty Murray, Curly Hamner, Stump and Stumpy
10. March 21, 1950: Tony Pastor and his Orchestra, Sam Levinson, Mario and Florio, others. Artie Shaw was scheduled to appear but was replaced for an unknown reason. This was confirmed by California newspaper TV listings when the episode was aired two weeks later.
11. March 28, 1950: Louis Prima and his Orchestra, Joey Adams, Tony Canzoneri, Andree and Bonnie, The Three Rockets
12. April 4, 1950: Carmen Cavallero and his Orchestra, Will Mahoney, Connie Haines, Wally Brown, The Debonaires
13. April 11, 1950: Xavier Cugat and his Orchestra, Herb Shriner, Abbe Lane, Tato and Julia, Otto Bolivar
14. April 18, 1950: Blue Barron and his Orchestra, Joan Merrill, Lucienne and Ashour, Teddy Hale
15. April 25, 1950: Claude Thornhill and his Orchestra, Russ McIntyre, Nancy Clayton, Joe Derise, Manuel and Marita Viera
16. May 2, 1950: Guy Lombardo and his Orchestra, The Dancing Dunhills, Al Bernie, John Sebastian
17. May 9, 1950: Lawrence Welk and his Champagne Music, Lou Holtz, Cropsey and Ayres, The Three Wiles (Shown two days later in NYC on WABD via kinescope due to a baseball telecast between the Yankees and St. Louis Browns).
18. May 16, 1950: Ray Anthony and his Orchestra, Jackie Miles, Dancing De Marlos, Viola Lane, Charlotte Fayne
19. May 23, 1950: Harry James and his Orchestra, Harold Leroy, The DeMarco Sisters, Connie Sawyer
20. May 30, 1950: Tex Beneke and his Orchestra, Helen Lee, Gregg Lawrence, Buddy Yeager, Toni Arden
21. June 6, 1950: Skitch Henderson and his Orchestra, Jane Pickens and the Escourtiers, Eileen O’Dare
22. June 13, 1950: Louis Prima and his Orchestra, Golden Gate Quartet, Shelia Bond, Herkie Styles
23. June 20, 1950: Dick Jurgens and his Orchestra, Monica Lewis, Red Buttons, Marion La Velle
24. June 27, 1950: Art Mooney and his Orchestra, Toni Harper, Phil Foster (Shown two days later in NYC on WABD via kinescope due to a baseball telecast between the Dodgers and the Giants)
25. July 4, 1950: Ray McKinley and his Orchestra, Buddy Lester, Billy Williams’ Quartet, Gloria Leroy, Lewis and Van
26. July 11, 1950: Harry James and his Orchestra, Eileen Barton, Howard and Wanda Bell, The Beachcombers, Archie Robbins
27. July 18, 1950: Duke Ellington and his Orchestra, Bobby Davis, Timmie and Rogers, Howell and Bowser, others. Jimmy Dorsey was supposed to appear but was replaced for an unknown reason. Confirmed via a review in the Pittsburgh Press.
28. July 25, 1950: Charlie Barnett and his Orchestra, Mildred Bailey, Henny Youngman, Manor and Mignon, The Three Arnuts
29. August 1, 1950: Tommy Tucker and his Orchestra, Jackie Gleason, Jane Dulo, Mayo Bros, Fred and Faye
30. August 8, 1950: Ralph Flanagan and his Orchestra, Thelma Carpenter, Joe Adams, Mark Plant, Bill Calahan, Tryloradagio Dancers
31. August 15, 1950: Johnny Long and his Orchestra, Jan Murray, George Prentice, Tommy and Margot Conine, Rudy Cardenas
32. August 22, 1950: Woody Herman and his Orchestra, George De Witt, Maria Neglia, Virginia Lee, Fred and Sledge
33. August 29, 1950: Ted Weems and his Orchestra, Romo Vincent, George Tapps, Monica Boyar
34. September 5, 1950: Charlie Spivak and his Orchestra, Red Buttons, Pierre D’Angelo and Ana, Jay Lawrence, Johnny Mack
35. September 12, 1950: Xavier Cugat and his Orchestra, Wally Brown, Tato and Julia, others
36. September 19, 1950: Shep Fields and his Orchestra, Wally Cox, The Hot Shots, Neal Stanley and the Kanazawa Trio
37. September 26, 1950: Tex Beneke and his Orchestra, Jay Marshall, Anthony, Allyn and Hodges, Frank Paris, Earl Barton
38. October 3, 1950: Gene Krupa and his Orchestra, Betty Brewer, Golden Gate Quartet, Bobby Layne, Claire and Paul Gray, Elisa Jayne
39. October 10, 1950: Louis Armstrong and His All Stars, Golden Gate Quartet, George Kirby, Bobby “Tables” Davis, The Three Poms
40. October 17, 1950: Tony Pastor and his Orchestra, Billy Vine, Helene and Howard, Lou Wills Jr., Marion Morgan. Guy Lombardo was scheduled to appear but was replaced for unknown reasons. This was confirmed using California newspaper TV listings when the episode was aired two weeks later.
41. October 24, 1950: Lawrence Welk and his Champagne Music, Perry Franks and Janyce, Henry Rich and Lucille Gibson, Cabot and Dresden
42. October 31, 1950: Claude Thornhill and his Orchestra, Howard and Wanda Bell, Mario and Florio, Tip, Tap and Toe, Buddy Lester
43. November 7, 1950: Tommy Tucker and his Orchestra, Don Brown, George Tapps, Bob Hammond and his Birds, Romaine and Babette. Jimmy Dorsey was scheduled to appear but was replaced for unknown reasons. This was confirmed using California newspaper TV listings when the episode was aired two weeks later.
44. November 14, 1950: Jerry Gray and his Orchestra, Rosalind Courtright, George de Witt, Condos and Brandow
45. November 21, 1950: Louis Prima and his Orchestra, Mayo Brothers, Jay Lawrence, Dietrich and Diane
46. November 28, 1950: Ray Anthony and his Orchestra, George De Witt, The Lunds, The Three Rockets
47. December 5, 1950: Elliot Lawrence and his Orchestra, John and Rene Arnaut, Fosse and Niles, George De Witt, Stump and Stumpy
48. December 12, 1950: Xavier Cugat and his Orchestra, Abbe Lane, Otto and Dulcina Garcia, Eddy Kosack, George De Witt, Peiro Brothers
49. December 19, 1950: Stan Kenton and his Orchestra, Jay Johnson, Teresa Brewer, The Calgary Brothers, George De Witt
50. December 26, 1950: Duke Ellington and his Orchestra, Harris and Radcliff, Bobby “Tables” Davis, Harold King, The Three Poms
51. January 2, 1951: Skitch Henderson and his Orchestra, Henny Youngman, Marian Morgan, Lewis and Van, Rita and Allen Farrell, Faye Emerson
52. January 9, 1951: Ray Bloch and his Orchestra, Rosemary Clooney, Bobby Lane, Claire and Georgie Kaye
53. January 16, 1951: Frankie Carle and his Orchestra, Erwin Corey, Francis Brunn, Helene and Howard, Meribeth Old
54. January 23, 1951: Shep Fields and his Orchestra, Mickey Deems, Wynters and Angeline, Russell Arms and Liza Palmer, Johnny Bachemin
55. January 30, 1951: Tommy Tucker and his Orchestra, Ken Whitmer, Bud and Cece Robinson, Harbers and Lane
56. February 6, 1951: Charlie Barnett and his Orchestra, Tip, Tap and Toe, others
57. February 13, 1951: Gene Krupa and his Orchestra, Frank Sinatra, Jackie Gleason, Clark Brothers
58. February 20, 1951: Guy Lombardo and his Orchestra, Jackie Gleason, Kitty Kalen, Rolly Rolls. This was the First Anniversary broadcast.
59. February 27, 1951: Ray Anthony and his Orchestra, Harvey Stone, The Berry Brothers, Susan Raye, Frank Paris, The Mello-Larks
60. March 6, 1951: Claude Thornhill and his Orchestra, Peggy Lee, Billy Vines, Hudson and Sharae, Betty Bruce
61. March 13, 1951: Charlie Spivak and his Orchestra, Sarah Vaughan, Christine and Moll, Bob Hammond's Birds, Wally Brown, The Mello-Larks
62. March 20, 1951: Louis Prima and his Orchestra, Eileen Barton, Al Bernie, Rolly and Bonnie Prickert, Ade Duval and company, Joseph Coffini
63. March 27, 1951: Ray Bloch and his Orchestra, Jimmy Nelson, Mary Raye and Naldi, Mello-Larks
64. April 3, 1951: Freddy Martin and his Orchestra, Ginny Simms, Hal Loman and Joan Fields, Jimmy Nelson
65. April 10, 1951: Freddy Martin and his Orchestra, Peggy Lee, Joey Bishop, Dick Byrd
66. April 17, 1951: Freddy Martin and his Orchestra, Morey Amsterdam, Rosemary Clooney
67. April 24, 1951: Freddie Martin and his Orchestra, Fran Warren, Joey Adams, Al Kelly
68. May 1, 1951: Louis Prima and his Orchestra, Jean Carroll, The DeMarco Sisters, The Clark Brothers
69. May 8, 1951: – Louis Prima and his Orchestra, Larry Storch, Toni Arden, Bobby Van
70. May 15, 1951: Louis Prima and his Orchestra, Phil Foster, Jane Hutton, The Mello-Larks
71. May 22, 1951: Louis Prima and his Orchestra, Buddy Lester, Calgary Brothers, Susan Raye, The Fontaines
72. May 29, 1951: Xavier Cugat and his Orchestra, (Note: Cugat apparently made disparaging remarks about radio on this program, causing his records to be banned by some radio stations.) Maurice Rocco, Joey Bishop, Abbe Lane, Tato and Julia
73. June 5, 1951: Xavier Cugat and his Orchestra, Mary Raye and Naldi, Carlos Ramirez and Gene Baylos, Jerry Bergen
74. June 12, 1951: Xavier Cugat and his Orchestra, Al Bernie, Carlos Ramirez, Margo and her Caribbeans
75. June 19, 1951: Xavier Cugat and his Orchestra, Wally Brown, Carlos Ramirez, Pierre D’Angelo and Ana, The Mello-Larks
76. June 26, 1951: Xavier Cugat and his Orchestra, Carlos Ramirez, Dave Barry, Manor and Mignon
77. July 3, 1951: Sammy Kaye and his Orchestra, Hal Le Roy, Lee Davis, Harbers and Dale
78. July 10, 1951: Sammy Kaye and his Orchestra, Phil Foster, Lewis and Van, Ricardo and Norma
79. July 17, 1951: Sammy Kaye and his Orchestra, Henny Youngman, Crane and Love, Lenny and Margie Ross
80. July 24, 1951: Sammy Kaye and his Orchestra, Kitty Marshall, Ken Whitmer, Gene Baylos, Blair and Dean
81. July 31, 1951: Cab Calloway and his Orchestra (Featured soloists: Jonah Jones, Milt Hinton), The Cabaliers, Bobby “Tables” Davis, Tip, Tap and Toe (Host Buddy Rogers on vacation)
82. August 7, 1951: Gene Krupa and his Orchestra, Fran Warren, Chaz Chase, Dusty McCaffery, Susanne and Frank Paris
83. August 14, 1951: Tex Beneke and his Orchestra, Wally Brown, The Kanazawa Trio, The Mello-Larks, The Abots
84. August 21, 1951: Tex Beneke and his Orchestra, Mary Mayo, Helene and Howard, George Conley, The Dunhills
85. August 28, 1951: Tex Beneke and his Orchestra, Joey Adams, Jo Sullivan, Jack and Marilyn Nagle, Jay Smythe
86. September 4, 1951: Charlie Spivak and his Orchestra, The Haydens, Morey Amsterdam, The Mello-Larks, Bob Hammond's Birds. (This episode exists at UCLA)
87. September 11, 1951: Woody Herman and his Orchestra, Dolly Houston, Joey Adams, Walter Long and Angel, Tato and Julia
88. September 18, 1951: Shep Fields and his Orchestra, Joe Frisco, Howard and Wanda Bell, Ramona Lang, Chester Dolphin
89. September 25, 1951: Guy Lombardo and his Orchestra, (Note: Some east coast newspapers listed Cab Calloway and his Orchestra as the featured band, but California newspaper TV listings on October 13 confirm that Guy Lombardo and his Orchestra did appear on the final broadcast.) Kitty Kalen, Al Bernie, The Pickerts, others.

Replaced the following week with "Cosmopolitan Theatre".

== See also ==
- List of programs broadcast by the DuMont Television Network
- List of surviving DuMont Television Network broadcasts
- 1950-51 United States network television schedule

== Bibliography ==
- David Weinstein, The Forgotten Network: DuMont and the Birth of American Television (Philadelphia: Temple University Press, 2004) ISBN 1-59213-245-6
