= Gruen Playhouse =

American TV dramatic anthology series (1952)

- Also known as: Gruen Guild Theater
- Starring: Raymond Burr; Bruce Cabot; Dane Clark; Ann Dvorak; Buddy Ebsen; Bonita Granville; Peter Graves (actor); Carolyn Jones; Shirley Jones; Cameron Mitchell (actor); Vincent Price; Marjorie Reynolds; Ann Rutherford; Ruth Warrick; Jane Ball
- Country of origin: United States

Production
- Producer: Leon Fromkess
- Running time: 30 minutes

Original release
- Network: ABC
- Release: September 27 – December 20, 1951
- Network: DuMont
- Release: January 17 – August 7, 1952

Gruen Playhouse is an American dramatic anthology series that was first known as Gruen Guild Theater when it debuted on ABC television on September 27, 1951. "Guild" was dropped from the title and "Playhouse" replaced "Theater" when it was then shown on the DuMont Television Network from January 17, 1952, until July 3, 1952.

Sponsored by the Gruen Watch Company, the series aired on ABC on Thursdays at 9:30pm ET, and then on DuMont on Thursdays at 9pm ET. From January to March 1952, Gruen Playhouse alternated with Shadow of the Cloak on DuMont.

The 30-minute dramas featured actors such as Carolyn Jones (in her TV debut), Raymond Burr (in his TV debut), and Bonita Granville. An early episode was written by Star Trek creator Gene Roddenberry.

Other actors who appeared on the series included Buddy Ebsen, Elisabeth Fraser, Bobby Jordan, and Patrick O'Neal.

== Episodes ==
Partial List of Episodes of Gruen Playhouse
Date	Episode	Actor(s)
April 24, 1952	"The Tiger"	Burr, Ludwig Donath
May 15, 1952	"Al Haddon's Lamp"	Robert Hutton, Ebsen.
August 12, 1952	"Emergency"	Hutton, Dorothy Patrick, John Hoyt
September 9, 1952	"The Leather Coat"	Randy Stuart, Burr
September 23, 1952	"Face Value"	Burr, Gabriel Curtis, Suzanne Dalbert

=== Status ===
Two DuMont episodes are held in the collection of the UCLA Film and Television Archive, along with a single ABC episode. Another episode, Joe Santa Claus, aired December 20, 1951, starring Maria Palmer, Ray Montgomery (actor), and Houseley Stevenson first appeared in a DVD release from Mill Creek Entertainment in 2010 called Holiday TV Classics. It is also available on the IMDb and Tubi sites for viewing.

== Production ==
MCA was the program packager, and Gruen Playhouse was a product of Revue Productions. Leon Fromkess was the producer. Alex Gruenberg, Richard Irving, and Norman Lloyd were directors. When the program was on Dumont it originated on film from WABD-TV.

== Critical response ==
A review of the episode "The Leather Coat" in the trade publication Variety called Burr's portrayal of the villain "a topnotch performance" and said that Stuart and Bill Phipps delivered "sensitive portrayals" of a young couple under duress. The review also commended the direction, script, and production of the episode.

== See also ==
- List of programs broadcast by the DuMont Television Network
- List of surviving DuMont Television Network broadcasts
- 1951-52 United States network television schedule

== Bibliography ==
- David Weinstein, The Forgotten Network: DuMont and the Birth of American Television (Philadelphia: Temple University Press, 2004) ISBN 1-59213-245-6
