= After the Deadlines =

1950s American evening news program

After the Deadlines is an American evening news program of the early 1950s. It was broadcast on the ABC network from April 1951 to October 1952.

Typical of evening television news programs of the era, it lasted fifteen minutes. After the Deadlines aired at 7:00 PM, earlier than its competitors, Camel News Caravan (NBC, 7:45 PM) and Douglas Edwards with the News (CBS, 7:30 PM) in an attempt to draw news viewers from these more-established networks. Its predecessor was News and Views, and its successor was All-Star News and, eventually, ABC World News Tonight, as seen in this list:

ABC evening news programs

- News and Views (August 11, 1948 – March 30, 1951)
- After the Deadlines (April 2, 1951 – October 3, 1952)
- All-Star News (October 6, 1952 – January 2, 1953)
- (No weekday evening news broadcast, January 5, 1953 – October 9, 1953)
- John Daly and the News (October 12, 1953 – September 12, 1958)
- ABC News (September 15, 1958 – May 8, 1959) (Note: During this time, John Daly and the News was broadcast at 10:30–10:45 PM, Eastern and Pacific times)
- John Daly and the News (May 11, 1959 – December 16, 1960)
- ABC World News Tonight (December 19, 1960 – present (As of 2025)) (Note: Also called, at various times, ABC Evening Report, ABC Evening News, and ABC World News Tonight, often with the name of the anchor appended)

In 1951 and 1952, most American households did not have television receivers, and ABC was a distinctly minor network compared to NBC and CBS, so After the Deadlines was not a major factor in the overall news business, and the identity of the anchor or anchors of After the Deadlines may be lost to history.
