= It's News to Me =

American TV series or program (1951-1954)

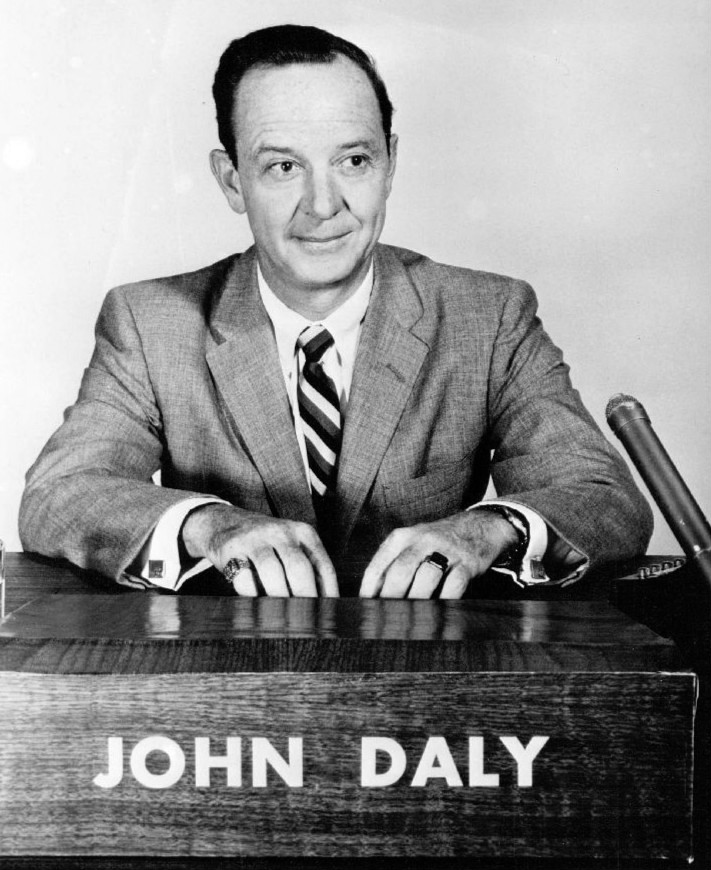
- John Daly as the host, 1952
- Genre: Panel game
- Created by: Mark Goodson; Bill Todman
- Directed by: Jerome Schnurr
- Presented by: John Charles Daly; Walter Cronkite
- Voices of: Art Hannes (announcer); Bill Hamilton (announcer); Bob Sherry (announcer); Bob Dixon (announcer)
- Country of origin: United States
- Original language: English
- No. of seasons: 3

Production
- Executive producers: Mark Goodson; Bill Todman
- Production locations: Mansfield Theatre; New York City, NY
- Camera setup: Multi-Camera
- Running time: 30 min.
- Production companies: Mark Goodson-Bill Todman Productions; CBS Television

Original release
- Network: CBS
- Release: May 11, 1951 – August 27, 1954

Related
- Who's Whose (One Broadcast, 1951)

It's News to Me is an American panel game show produced by Mark Goodson and Bill Todman for CBS Television. It was a derivative of Goodson-Todman's own panel show What's My Line?. Originally aired as a one-time special on May 11, 1951; It debuted as a series July 2, 1951, to August 27, 1954.

== Host and panelists ==
The original series was hosted by veteran radio and television newsman John Charles Daly, concurrent with his regular hosting duties on What's My Line?. CBS newsman Walter Cronkite would eventually host the 1954 version.

Among the celebrities who would appear as panelists were actresses Anna Lee and Nina Foch, journalist Quincy Howe, TV hostess Robin Chandler, radio host and storyteller John Henry Faulk, New York Yankees play-by-play announcer Mel Allen, and writer Quentin Reynolds.

== Game play ==
Each typical episode contained two contestant rounds, followed by a newsmaker round, and occasionally followed by an additional contestant round.

=== Contestant round ===
Each round was a bluffing game where contestants attempted to determine if an answer that was given by one of the panelists was true or false.

The contestant was staked to $25 at the beginning of the game. The contestant and panelists were then shown an item or items including props, drawings, photographs, or motion picture/newsreel footage. Sometimes a dramatic performance (example: Goodson-Todman staffer Frank Wayne appears giving part of a speech) was presented. A panelist chosen by the emcee would then supply a story that would tie the item to a news event, past or present. The contestant would then decide if the panelist's story was true or false. The contestant earned $5 for a correct decision and $5 was deducted for an incorrect decision. Play continued until all four panelists had played and the contestant kept whatever money that was earned at the end.

=== Newsmaker round ===
In this round, eyewitnesses or participants involved with news events in the past or present would play a game similar to I've Got a Secret. The panelists would question the newsmaker to determine the identity of the news event. If the panel failed to identify the event, the newsmaker would receive $100.

== Broadcast history ==
The first episode aired as a one-off special May 11, 1951.

In mid-1951, CBS cancelled its popular comedy-drama The Goldbergs after its creator Gertrude Berg refused to cooperate with the Hollywood blacklist and General Foods withdrew its sponsorship. The first show commissioned to replace The Goldbergs was the panel game show Who's Whose; Who's Whose proved to be such a disaster that it was pulled from the air after a single episode. It's News to Me was put into production to occupy the time slot, making its debut July 2. The show then continued airing into the fall. However the show's ratings were weak enough that by late September CBS was reportedly asking sponsor General Foods to replace it with a stronger show. The ratings for It's News to Me that fall would prove to be much lower than its new lead-in, the breakout hit I Love Lucy, which premiered in October. On March 31, 1952 it surrendered its time slot to Claudia, The Story of a Marriage. After several more moves, It's News to Me ended its initial run on September 12, 1953. The show then returned July 9 to August 27, 1954, as a summer replacement for Person to Person.

== Sponsors ==
When It's News to Me began its run it was sponsored by General Foods (advertising Sanka), which had already held the sponsorship of this time slot during The Goldbergs. During the show's summer 1952 run it was sponsored by Alcoa. Beginning on October 4, 1952, it was sponsored by the Simmons Bedding Company, with the Andrew Jergens Company joining as the alternate sponsor on October 11, 1952. The 1954 edition was sponsored by Amoco.

== Episode status ==
Like other live broadcast series of the time, It's News to Me was recorded via kinescope onto film and the status of most of the episodes is unknown. As of summer 2009, only two John Daly-hosted episodes have aired on GSN as part of its black and white programming blocks, and a portion of a Walter Cronkite-hosted episode exists as part of a 1992 birthday tribute tape for producer Mark Goodson.

On September 15, 2017, and January 16, 2023, BUZZR aired an episode as part of their "Lost and Found" series.
