= Your Prize Story =

- Country of origin: United States
- Original language: English

Production
- Running time: 30 minutes

Original release
- Network: NBC
- Release: April 2 – May 28, 1952

Your Prize Story is an American anthology television series that aired live on NBC from April 2, 1952, to May 28, 1952, on Wednesday nights at 10:00PM EST. In a unique format, the program's sponsor Hazel Bishop requested that viewers submit story ideas to the show. The story had to be true and would be rewritten by the show's staff before airing. If the viewer's story was used on the air, they received a $1,000 prize. The presentations were done with little scenery or props, similar to dinner theater.

The program debuted as I Confess. The name was changed to Your Prize Story beginning on April 9, 1952. Albert McCleery was the producer and director. It originated from WNBT.
