= Crime Syndicated =

- Genre: Anthology
- Presented by: Rudolph Halley; Herbert O'Conor
- Country of origin: United States
- Original language: English

Production
- Running time: 30 minutes

Original release
- Network: CBS
- Release: September 19, 1951 – June 23, 1953

Crime Syndicated is an American anthology series that aired on CBS from September 18, 1951, to June 23, 1953.

The program featured dramatizations of actual cases from the FBI and local law enforcement agencies. The series was hosted by Rudolph Halley, the Chief Counsel to the Senate Special Committee to Investigate Crime in Interstate Commerce, when he became president of the New York City Council in 1951, he alternated hosting with Maryland senator Herbert O'Conor.

In March 1952, the series alternated with City Hospital.

The program was sponsored by the Shick razor company.

== Critical reception ==
Jack Gould, The New York Times's television critic, described the program's debut episode as "riddled with implausibilities and absurdities". He summarized elements of the plot that "made the courts, judges, police and prosecuting attorneys appear to be utterly stupid and incompetent". Gould also questioned Halley's participation in the program while he was a candidate for president of the City Council of New York City: "He is seriously jeopardizing his dignity and authority at a time when both should be at their zenith".

Media critic John Crosby wrote, "After Mr. Halley gets out of the way and the dramatic portion open, you'll find it's a very honest show, full of authentic crime stuff . . . and it is excellently produced, directed and acted". Crosby also questioned Halley's participation in the program, writing, ". . . there is a certain abuse of public trust in former chief counsels of Congressional committees who suddenly become TV stars on the strength of the public clamor they kicked up in their former roles".

== Bibliography ==
- Tim Brooks and Earle Marsh, The Complete Directory to Prime Time Network and Cable TV Shows 1946–Present, Ninth edition (New York: Ballantine Books, 2007) ISBN 978-0-345-49773-4
