= Gus Sun =

American theatrical impresario (1868–1959)

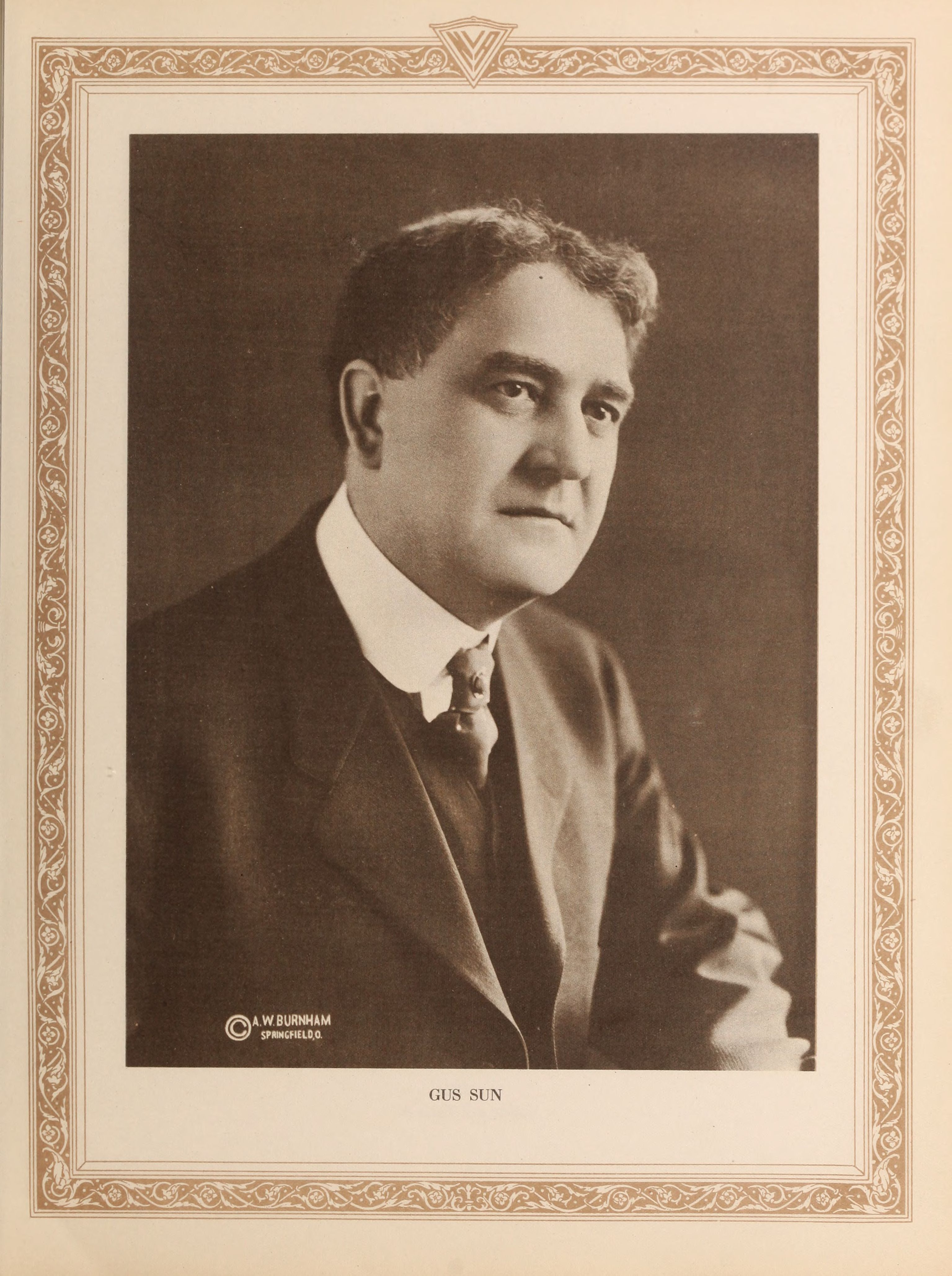
- circa 1923
- Born: Gustave Klotz; October 7, 1868; Toledo, Ohio, U.S.
- Died: October 1, 1959 (aged 90); Springfield, Ohio, U.S.
- Occupation: Vaudeville impresario

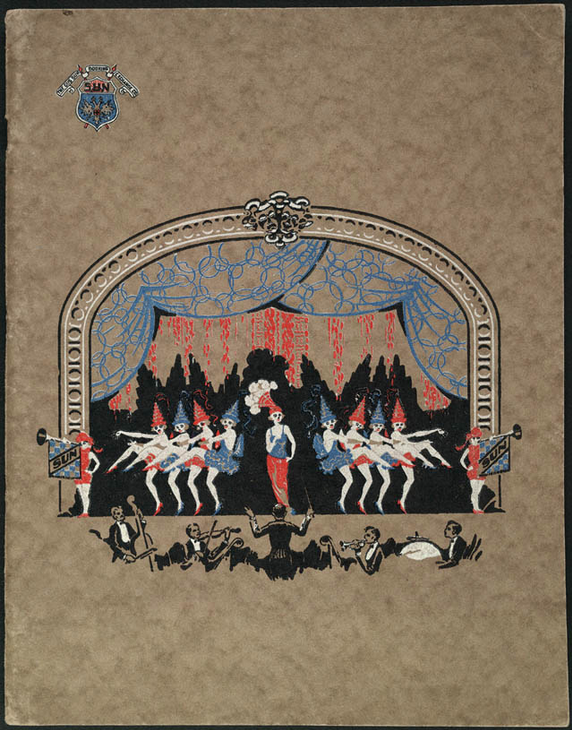
Program of Gus Sun Booking Exchange, 1925. Bob Hope Collection, Library of Congress

Gus Sun (born Gustave Klotz; October 7, 1868 – October 1, 1959) was an American theatrical impresario, based in Springfield, Ohio, who, through his Gus Sun Booking Exchange, ran a vaudeville circuit for over fifty years, starting in 1889.

He also was a circus owner between 1892 and 1918, running Sun Bros. Greater Progressive Shows, 1911 (Sun Brothers' World's Progressive Shows, 1915) with his brothers, Q Pete and George. Headquartered in Springfield, the circus wintered in Macon, Georgia. The circus was disbanded after the 1918 influenza pandemic that saw the circus quarantined in Atlanta in October.

== Career ==
As a booking agent, Gus Sun was known for creating the "split week" booking in which performers divided a single week between two cities, performing in one city for three days at the beginning of the week then moving on to the second city for three more, with a travel day in between. The split week promoted more variety for vaudeville theaters. Sun also introduced the cancellation policy where an act could be fired after the first show. He was known for the number of famous performers who developed their acts early in their careers on his Sun Circuit.

Though the Gus Sun circuit was considered "small time" and the bottom of the barrel for performers, arguably it was the most successful of the minor vaudeville "wheels" as circuits were known. According to a 1939 profile in Billboard magazine, at the height of vaudeville's popularity, "Gus Sun was booking nearly a thousand acts weekly into nearly 300 houses from Coast to Coast, which meant approximately two years of steady work, even with the split week which Sun started and popularized."

Born Gustave Klotz in Toledo, Ohio, to immigrants from Germany, his father died when he was four and after apprenticing in a tin shop for 15 cents per ten-hour day, he ran away and joined a circus where he became a juggler. In 1889, he left the Summerville and Lee Circus, based in Chicago, when he netted only $7 from his $15 weekly paycheck, as he had to cover his own expenses. Sun had often appeared in vaudeville when the circus was on layoff, and in 1889 he made a career change and became a booking agent.

Sun moved to Springfield, Ohio, in 1904 and rented the Lyric movie theater in the Fisher Building at the corner of Main and Limestone Streets for $150 a week, which he turned into the Orpheum vaudeville house. In 1913, Sun paid $95,000 to acquire the building to create a bigger showplace. He started his booking agency in 1906, and the vaudeville wheel of houses he owned and booked for was called Gus Sun Time.

Billboard reported in 1925 that the Gus Sun Booking Exchange Co. had entered into an agreement with three other circuits – the Chamberlain circuit in Philadelphia; Ackerman and Harris vaudeville circuit (Charles and Irving Ackerman with Simon (Sam) Harris) in California; and Frank Kierney in New York City and Brooklyn – to create a coast-to-coast wheel of 266 vaudeville theaters. Gus Sun was the head of the consolidated operation.

The Gus Sun Booking Exchange hired performers for 275 to 300 vaudeville houses in Ohio, where Sun maintained his office, as well as in Illinois, Indiana, Kentucky, Michigan, Pennsylvania, and West Virginia. Sun's success came from concentrating on fourth- and fifth-grade vaudeville houses, primarily in the Midwest but also in the South. Mae West honed her skills while on the Gus Sun circuit. The Sun circuit effectively became a proving ground for new talents to hone their acts.

In addition to Mae West, performers that broke into vaudeville that played the Gus Sun wheel included Fanny Brice, Eddie Cantor, W.C. Fields, Bob Hope, the Marx Brothers and Will Rogers. Vaudeville acts that became popular soon left the Sun circuit for more lucrative wheels, while those acts that remained stuck with Sun were considered "small-time".

Sports stars often supplemented their income on the vaudeville circuit, and among the superstars that started out on the Sun Circuit was the baseball player Cap Anson and heavyweight champs Jack Dempsey and the man who took his title, Gene Tunney.

== Death ==
Billboard reported that Sun died on October 1, 1959, at Mercy Hospital in Springfield, Ohio, from complications from a broken hip sustained in a fall two weeks earlier.
