= Lyman Bryson =

American educator, media advisor and author

Lyman Lloyd Bryson (July 11, 1888 – November 24, 1959) was an American educator, media advisor and author known for his work in educational radio and television programs for CBS from the 1930s through the 1950s.

== Early years ==
Bryson was born in Valentine, Nebraska, on July 12, 1888. The family lived near an Indian reservation. His father was a pharmacist, and Bryson described his mother as a pioneer woman who instilled a love of building and who believed that beautiful words could achieve social good. He was educated at the University of Michigan after graduating from an Omaha high school. He gained journalistic experience by working as a reporter for The Omaha Bee during his college summers, and he left the university in 1912-1913 to work for The Detroit Evening News. When he returned to campus in 1913, he taught journalism and rhetoric while earning a Master of Arts degree.

== Career ==
During World War I Bryson worked for the American Red Cross, a relationship that continued after the war ended. He left the Red Cross in 1928 to take a joint position as professor of anthropology at San Diego State Teachers College and associate director of the San Diego Museum of Anthropology; He joined Columbia's Teachers College's faculty in 1934

Bryson was a frequent guest on the radio game show Information, Please. Bryson served as a professor at Teachers College, Columbia University from 1934 to 1953.

Bryson chaired the Adult Education Board for CBS Radio, moderating such programs as The American School of the Air and Invitation to Learning. From 1938 to 1946 he hosted the public affairs program, The People's Platform, which was adapted for television (1948–1950).

Bryson's obituary in The New York Times said of his work on Invitation to Learning, "He revitalized the musty old philosophers and made them live again for untold thousands seeking knowledge." Along those lines, he created the Readability Laboratory at Columbia's Teachers College as a vehicle for revising books about economics, political economy, and sociology, making their content simpler and more vigorous in order to make it more understandable.

== Personal life and death ==
Bryson was married twice, first to Hope Mersereau in St. Louis on October 4, 1912, and he had a son. He died of cancer in Columbia Presbyterian Medical Center on November 24, 1959, at age 71.

== Literature ==
- Bryson, Lyman (1936). Adult Education
- Bryson, Lyman (1948). Autobiographical essay in Finkelstein, Louis (1948). American Spiritual Autobiographies: Fifteen Self-Portraits. New York: Harper and Brothers. pp. 65–82.
- Bryson, Lyman (1952). The Next America: Prophecy and Faith
- Bryson, Lyman (1954). The Drive Toward Reason. In the Service of a Free People
