= Boss Lady =

American TV sitcom series (1952)

- Starring: Lynn Bari
- Country of origin: United States
- Original language: English
- No. of seasons: 1

Production
- Running time: 30 minutes

Original release
- Network: NBC
- Release: July 1 – September 23, 1952

Boss Lady is an American television sitcom that aired on NBC as a summer replacement for Fireside Theatre from July 1 to September 23, 1952.

== Plot ==
Gwen F. Allen was the chief executive Hillandale Homes, a construction firm. Her father was the "well-intentioned but inept" chairman of the board. Jeff was her boyfriend, and Aggie was the secretary.

Episodes usually dealt with either keeping Allen's father in his position or finding a general manager who would not become infatuated with her.

== Production ==
Boss Lady was a production of Wrather Television Productions, Inc. Jack Wrather and Bob Mann were co-producers. Mann also wrote the scripts, and Bill Russell directed. Episodes were recorded on film with no laugh track.

== Cast ==
- Lynn Bari as Gwen F. Allen
- Nicholas Joy as Gwen's father
- Glenn Langan as Jeff Standish
- Charlie Smith as Chester Allen
- Lee Patrick as Aggie
- Richard Gainer as Roger

== Sponsor and schedule ==
Procter & Gamble sponsored Boss Lady for Ivory Soap and Lilt Home Permanent. It was broadcast 9-9:30 p.m. (Eastern Daylight Time) on Tuesdays.
