= Dell O'Dell =

American magician (1897–1962)

Dell O'Dell was the stage name of Odella Newton (20 October 1897 – 5 February 1962) an American magician regarded in her profession as a pioneer who provided a role model for modern female performers. She was noted for being one of the first magicians to appear on television, on her own show, The Dell O'Dell Show, on ABC's local station in Los Angeles in 1951. Her show also had a brief ABC network run from September 14 to December 14, 1951. She was also one of few American women to have her own circus, the Della O'Dell Society Circus, which toured the Midwest in 1925 and 1926. Before becoming one of the most popular female magicians on the night club circuit during the 1930s, 40s, and 50s, Dell O'Dell also performed in vaudeville and burlesque. Her skills included juggling furniture and lecturing on physical culture.

At an early stage of her career, she acquired the rights to the comedy magic act of Frank Van Hoven (1886-1929) and created her own versions of his burlesque magic tricks. At the height of her career, she was billed as "The World's Leading Lady Magician" and "The Queen of Magic."

== Career ==
Odella Newton's father Lucky Bill Newton (1859-1937) ran his own circus, and she began learning juggling from the performers on his circus when she was young. Odella developed a strongwoman act and "could climb up one side of a ladder and down the other with a sofa balanced on her chin". She developed a style that featured snappy patter and cute rhymes, which became something of a trademark. During the 1930s, Newton entered vaudeville, using the stage name Dell O'Dell. She subsequently became a comedy magician. In 1931, she married Charles Carrer (1898-1971), a famous juggler from Zurich, Switzerland, who sometimes assisted in her show and rebuilt and repaired props for her.

She became a pioneer of television magic when The Dell O'Dell Show began transmission on July 13, 1951 on local station KECA-TV in the Los Angeles area in California. She thus pre-dated several other noted pioneers of television magic, such as Mark Wilson, whose first television show began in 1955, and Richiardi Jr who made the first of his record run of appearances on The Ed Sullivan Show in 1956.

O'Dell wrote frequently on the subject of magic. For eight years in the 1940s, she contributed a column titled "Dell-lightfully" for the magicians' magazine The Linking Ring. She also produced a number of books of tricks and performance routines, including Presenting Magical Moments (1939) and On Both Sides of the Footlights (1946), though both books were ghost-written for her. Her "Stamp Album" presentation was published in volume 4 of the Tarbell Course in Magic.

O'Dell died age 64 of multiple myeloma and left her body to UCLA Medical Center for scientific research. Her husband Charlie died on December 25, 1971.

In 2014, Michael Claxton's biography of O'Dell, Don't Fool Yourself: The Magical Life of Dell O'Dell, was released by Squash Publishing.
