= Faye Emerson's Wonderful Town =

- Genre: Variety show
- Presented by: Faye Emerson; Skitch Henderson
- Country of origin: United States
- Original language: English
- No. of seasons: 1
- No. of episodes: 42

Production
- Executive producer: Gil Fates
- Camera setup: Multi-camera
- Running time: 30 minutes

Original release
- Network: CBS
- Release: June 16, 1951 – April 12, 1952

Faye Emerson's Wonderful Town, also known as Wonderful Town, USA, is a half-hour variety television series that aired on CBS from June 16, 1951, to April 19, 1952, in which Faye Emerson visits various cities. Episodes of the program were also shown to American military personnel overseas via Kinescope.

== Premise ==
Wonderful Town is one of several 1950s series in which Emerson, called the "first lady of television", had a starring role. Emerson's third husband, bandleader Skitch Henderson, appeared with her on the series. Because the series was broadcast on location, it was particularly expensive to produce.

Music, drama, and narrative in each episode were tailored to the city from which it originated. Guest stars were people associated with the city.

In the premiere episode, Emerson visits Boston, Massachusetts. On July 7, 1951, she hosted Barry Bingham, Sr., publisher of the Louisville Courier-Journal, when the program visited Louisville, Kentucky. In the fifth episode based in Minneapolis, Minnesota, which aired on July 14, former mayor and then U.S. Senator Hubert H. Humphrey and actor Richard Carlson were among the guests. On October 27, 1951, humorist and author Abe Burrows was the guest star in his native The Bronx borough of New York City.

On December 1, 1951, Emerson focuses on four college towns, Los Angeles: UCLA, Dallas: Southern Methodist University, and in New England: Smith College and Dartmouth College. On December 8, 1951, Emerson visited the city where she was reared, San Diego, California, with Mayor John D. Butler and Florence Chadwick, a swimmer of the English Channel, as the guests. On January 19, 1952, Emerson hosted columnist Earl Wilson in Columbus, Ohio. On February 2, the host city is Washington, D.C., featuring U.S. Senator Margaret Chase Smith of Maine. On March 1, 1952, the editor Virginius Dabney was the guest as the series visited Richmond, Virginia. Other segments focus on Paris, Mexico City, and Brooklyn. The last episode is set in Times Square.

Emerson hosted one Wonderful Town program from New Orleans.

The Don Large Chorus performed on Wonderful Town, which aired on Saturdays at 9 p.m. Eastern Standard Time.

== Other guest stars ==
- Pearl Bailey
- Sally Benson
- Dane Clark
- Rosemary Clooney
- Wally Cox
- Jane Darwell
- Dizzy Dean
- Johnny Desmond
- Dave Garroway
- Lillian Gish
- Benny Goodman
- W.C. Handy
- The Honey Dreamers
- The Ink Spots
- Buster Keaton
- Patrick H. O'Malley, Jr.
- Garry Moore
- Hazel Scott
- Cornelia Otis Skinner
- Gladys Swarthout
- Mel Torme
- Ernest Truex
- Nancy Walker
- Margaret Whiting
