= Maggi McNellis =

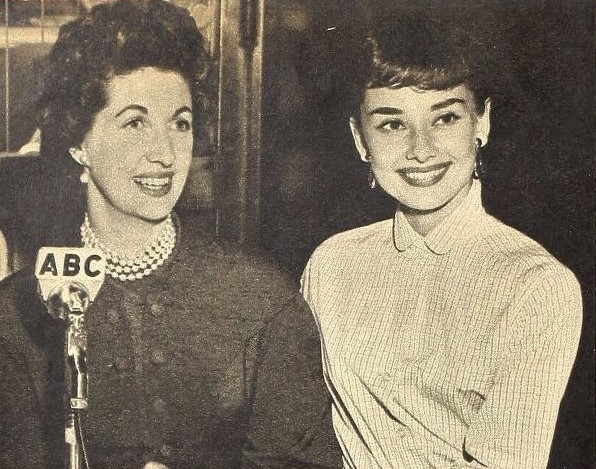
- Maggi McNellis interviewing Audrey Hepburn, 1953
- Born: Margaret Eleanor Roche; June 1, 1917; Chicago, Illinois, U.S.
- Died: May 24, 1989 (aged 71); New York City, New York, U.S.
- Occupations: Radio & television personality
- Years active: 1937(?)–1989
- Spouse(s): Richard V. McNellis (m. 1938?); Clyde M. Newhouse (m. 1946)

Maggi McNellis (June 1, 1917 – May 24, 1989) was an American radio and television personality and talk show hostess from the 1940s through the 1960s. In the latter part of her life, she became a New York City society hostess.

== Early life ==
Maggi McNellis, the daughter of George J. and Maude Roche, was born Margaret Eleanor Roche in Chicago, Illinois, June 1, 1917. She attended Rosemont College, Pennsylvania, in the mid-1930s. In the late 1930s, she began her show business career as a supper club singer, appearing at the Pump Room in Chicago, and at the Rainbow Room in New York City. She also married Richard V. McNellis sometime in the late 1930s (1938?), and took her married name as her professional name. She married New York City art gallery owner Clyde Mortimer Newhouse in 1946.

== Radio career ==
In 1943, McNellis became the hostess of a radio talk show that focused on show business and celebrity gossip, The Maggi McNellis Show which ran for many years, and, soon after, another, Maggi's Private Wire, on the air 1944 through 1948.

She often appeared as a panelist on the late 1940s national radio show Leave It to the Girls.

She hosted a half-hour celebrity gossip show in New York City, on WABC-Radio, called Maggi's Magazine, starting in late fall 1953 and continuing on locally for several years in the 1950s.

Throughout the 1940s and 1950s, she was the interviewer in many five-minute interview segments (with such titles as Celebrity Talks), for insertion in radio news and other radio shows nationwide.

== Television career ==
McNellis was "one of early TV's ubiquitous personalities", and was often described as "one of the ten best-dressed women in America". Touted as a famous radio and television star (and often as "best-dressed"), she was seen in many print testimonial ads in the 1940s and 1950s, for such varied sponsors as Tintair Hair Coloring, Blatz Beer, and Cafe DeLaPaix.

=== Crystal Room ===
She hosted a short-lived variety show, Crystal Room, broadcast weekly on the ABC network from August 15, 1948, through September 12, 1948. The television show was set in an imaginary nightclub, and was broadcast on Sunday nights, 8:30–9 PM (EST).

Carl Reiner remembered the show:

- The room was set up like a nightclub. There were people sitting at a table, and she would come over and talk to you. It was half an interview show and then you would get up and do something. There was no nightclub like that in the world. They paid you $125, which seems like a lot for five minutes' work, but it really wasn't because a lot of people were seeing it, and you were ruining your act for club dates.

=== Maggi's Private Wire ===
In this television show named after her radio show, McNellis interviewed show business stars and other celebrities. It was broadcast weekly on NBC from April 12, 1949, until July 2, 1949. For the first month, it was on the air in the Tuesday night 7:30–7:45 PM (EST) timeslot; then, from May 1949 onward, it was broadcast Saturday nights in the same timeslot.

=== Leave It to the Girls ===
When the Leave It to the Girls radio show (which, produced by Meet the Press creator Martha Rountree, had premiered in 1945) moved to television as a weekly primetime show on the NBC network on April 27, 1949, McNellis became the host and moderator, replacing radio show hostess Paula Stone. The show had begun as a serious-minded discussion of the problems of career women, but it soon became a comedic commentary on love, romance, and marriage from an almost-all female panel — one man was always on the panel to provide the male viewpoint. The last NBC show was in 1951; ABC took control in 1953; 1954 was the last year for ABC's national nighttime version. McNellis also hosted a syndicated daytime version that came on the air for a short time in 1962-1963.

=== Say It With Acting ===
A game of celebrity charades, originally broadcast locally on television in New York City, starting in January 1949 and called Look Ma, I'm Acting, became the weekly national NBC show Act It Out in 1951 — the show's name later changed to Say It With Acting. It featured McNellis as a permanent team captain (Bud Collyer was the other team captain), with actors and actresses from various Broadway productions as team members; Ben Grauer was the host. The first national show was broadcast on NBC January 6, 1951, and was broadcast Saturday nights 6:30–7 PM (EST) through May 1951. The show then moved to ABC, premiering there in August 1951, and continuing through February 22, 1952, shown on Friday nights in the 7:30–8 PM (EST) timeslot.

=== Other television appearances ===
McNellis appeared as herself in the not-well-received Betty Hutton television special Satins and Spurs in 1954.

In the late 1950s, she also hosted The Maggi McNellis Show and Maggi's Magazine, local television shows patterned after her radio shows, and aired in New York City.

== Writing career ==
McNellis co-wrote two books about party games, Party Games (1949), and How to Run a Successful Party: the Complete Handbook of Party Games, Quizzes, and Stunts (1950), the first with Hubie Boscowitz and, the second, with Boscowitz and Louise Price Bell.

== Society life ==
McNellis, as Mrs. Clyde Newhouse, maintained an active high-society social life throughout the 1960s, 1970s and 1980s, as a hostess of charity fashion shows and as chairwoman of society balls. She was active in fundraising for the Southampton Hospital, the Parrish Art Museum, Guideposts for Children, the Police Athletic League, and United Cerebral Palsy of New York.

== Personal life ==
McNellis died May 24, 1989, in New York City, at the age of 71 (her husband, Clyde Newhouse, had died in 1986 at the age of 66). Surviving her were her daughter, Meg Kirkpatrick, a brother, George Roche (both of Manhattan), and grandchildren Roger and Molly Kirkpatrick.

== Sources ==
- Anderson, Susan Heller (May 25, 1989). "Maggi McNellis, 71, TV Hostess". The New York Times.
- Current Biography Yearbook, 1955. New York: The H. W. Wilson Company. 1956. pp. 400–401.
