= Keep Posted =

- Also known as: The Big Issue
- Presented by: Martha Rountree (moderator); Lawrence Spivak (panelist); Ray Wood (panelist)
- Country of origin: United States

Production
- Running time: 30 Minutes

Original release
- Network: DuMont
- Release: October 9, 1951 – January 18, 1954

Keep Posted (later known as The Big Issue) is an American public affairs TV series on the DuMont Television Network which was sponsored by The Saturday Evening Post for its first two seasons.

== Broadcast history ==
Keep Posted premiered on October 9, 1951, airing Tuesdays at 8:30 pm EST. On April 7, 1953, the title was changed to The Big Issue. This occurred after the Post stopped sponsoring the program. In September 1953 The Big Issue moved to Mondays at 8:30 pm, with its final broadcast on January 18, 1954.

Martha Rountree was the moderator, and Lawrence Spivak and Ray Wood were among the panelists. Both Rountree and Spivak were involved in the creation of Meet the Press on NBC.

Episodes included one in which United States Senators Robert A. Taft and Richard B. Russell debated foreign policy on April 22, 1952. Adoption of a proposed Constitutional amendment to guarantee equal rights for women was discussed by U. S. Representatives Katharine St. George and Emanuel Celler on the January 20, 1953, episode.

== Episode status ==
Only two episodes are known to exist, "Peace in the Middle East" (first broadcast November 2, 1952), held by the Paley Center for Media, along with another 1952 episode "Should Truman Be Renominated?" as part of the Peabody Award collection.

== Critical response ==
Jack Gould wrote in a review in The New York Times that Keep Posted suffered because Rountree and Spivak tried to make the show noticeably different from Meet the Press. As a result, Gould said, the show was "a good deal less effective than it should be". In particular he cited the questioning of guests by citizens rather than by journalists, He added that most of the questioners were either politicians or advocates for civic movements. Their questions, he said, "ramble all over the lot and often are prefaced with virtual speeches by the panel."

== See also ==
- List of programs broadcast by the DuMont Television Network
- List of surviving DuMont Television Network broadcasts

== Bibliography ==
- David Weinstein, The Forgotten Network: DuMont and the Birth of American Television (Philadelphia: Temple University Press, 2004) ISBN 1-59213-245-6
- Alex McNeil, Total Television, Fourth edition (New York: Penguin Books, 1980) ISBN 0-14-024916-8
- Tim Brooks and Earle Marsh, The Complete Directory to Prime Time Network and Cable TV Shows 1946–Present, Ninth edition (New York: Ballantine Books, 2007) ISBN 978-0-345-49773-4
