= Eloise McElhone =

American radio and television personality (1920/1921–1974)

Eloise McElhone (1920 or 1921 – July 1, 1974) was an American radio and television personality in the 1950s.

== Early years ==
McElhone was the daughter of Mr. and Mrs. Arthur Johnston McElhone, and she had a sister. She attended St. Lawrence Academy and graduated from the Todhunter School. Before she began working on radio and television, she was a supervisor of 24 clerks at the Food Rationing Board in the Bronx.

== Career ==
McElhone's entry into broadcasting resulted from her mother's attendance at a dinner party hosted by Martha Rountree in the spring of 1945. During the event, Rountree commented that she needed one more woman to complete the panel of her upcoming radio program, Leave It to the Girls, and that the woman needed to be "young, smart, pretty and a good talker". McElhone's mother suggested Eloise, who was selected after a successful audition the next day.

=== Radio ===
McElhone was a regular panelist on Leave It to the Girls on the Mutual Broadcasting System from 1945 to 1949. She portrayed the secretary to John K. M. McCaffrey when he began a commentary program on WNBC in New York City in October 1947. She and Walter Kiernan were co-hosts of Sparring Partners on WJZ radio in New York City. The talk show began in January 1953.

=== Television ===
In 1948 McElhone became a fashion commentator on Paris Cavalcade of Fashion on TV. She hosted an interview program on WABD in New York City in 1949. A review of one episode in the trade publication Billboard described the sessions with guests as "moderately interesting" and added, "It's tough to make interviews sparkle and these don't."

McElhone continued being a panelist on Leave It to the Girls when the show moved to television, "the most constant panel member over the years". She was master of ceremonies on Quick on the Draw when it began as a local show on WNBT-TV in New York City in May 1950. A review of that program in Billboard called McElhone "the only real strong point on the show." It continued, "Lush to look at and quick of manner and speech, she is always an interesting and capable performer . . ."

Beginning on October 5, 1953, she had the Eloise McElhone Show on weekday afternoons on WPIX in New York City. Topics on the 30-minute show included women's and girls' fashions. In 1954, McElhone was a "weather girl" on Channel 4 in New York City. She also appeared regularly on TV on Eloise Salutes the Stars, Leave It to the Girls, and Meet the Experts.

=== Advertising ===
McElhone appeared in print advertising for Regimen Tablets, a weight-loss product.

== Personal life and death ==
McElhone worked as a volunteer with cerebral palsy. She married advertising executive William Paul Warwick on April 6, 1951, in New York City. They had two daughters, and they were divorced. On July 1, 1974, she died of a heart attack at her home in New York City, aged 53.
