= Leave It to the Girls =

- Genre: Talk show
- Created by: Martha Rountree
- Presented by: Paula Stone; Maggi McNellis
- Country of origin: United States
- Original language: English

Production
- Running time: 23 minutes

Original release
- Network: Local WNBT (1947); NBC (1949–1951); ABC (1953–1954); Syndicated (1962-1963); Syndicated (1981-1982)
- Release: August 21, 1947 – March 27, 1954

Leave It to the Girls is an American radio and television talk show, created by Martha Rountree, and broadcast, in various forms, from the 1940s through the 1980s.

== Broadcast details ==
=== Radio version ===
The series was originally a radio program airing on the Mutual radio network starting in 1945 with hostess Paula Stone. The show was created by Meet the Press creator Martha Rountree as a serious-minded discussion of the problems of career women, but soon became a comedic commentary on love, romance, and marriage from an almost-all female panel – one man was always on the panel to provide the male viewpoint.

In addition to Rountree and Stone, women regularly heard on the program included Dorothy Kilgallen, Elissa Landi, Maggi McNellis, Constance Bennett, Robin Chandler, Hedda Hopper, and Eloise McElhone. Ted Malone posed questions. Andre Baruch and Tiny Ruffner were the announcers.

=== Television versions ===
The program first came to television with a brief local run on New York City's NBC station, WNBT, premiering on August 21, 1947. It ran until September 25, 1947. The show then began broadcasting on the entire NBC television network on April 27, 1949, continuing until December 30, 1951; Maggi McNellis replaced radio show hostess Paula Stone. After it left NBC it was picked up by the ABC television network, which broadcast it from October 3, 1953, to March 27, 1954. An article in Time magazine said the program "features a panel of four intimidating ladies in low bodices, who alternate between badgering a male guest and solving such deep questions as 'Can a romance that is dead be revived?'".

A syndicated weekday daytime version, also hosted by Maggi McNellis, was broadcast 1962–63.

Another version, called Leave it to the Women, produced by Chuck Barris, and hosted by Stephanie Edwards, aired 1981–1982 in syndication.

== Cast ==
Stage and film actress Paula Stone was one of the hostesses for the radio version of the show, along with Elissa Landi and Maggi McNellis. The NBC, ABC, and the 1960s television versions were all hosted by McNellis, a 1930s supper club singer, a 1940s radio show hostess for her own shows, and a New York City society hostess through the 1980s. All the female panelists could be characterized as "glamorous, well-dressed, showbiz types". Some of the female television panelists were Eloise McElhone (1921-1974), Vanessa Brown, Florence Pritchett, Lisa Ferraday, Ann Rutherford, Harriet Van Horne, and Janet Blair. McElhone was also host of the DuMont series Quick on the Draw and Eloise Salutes the Stars.

Among the men appearing as the solitary male presence on the television panel were George Brent, Burt Lancaster, Morey Amsterdam, Henry Morgan, and George Jessel — John Henry Faulk was the permanent male panelist in the primetime television show's last year, 1954. The male seemed to be at a disadvantage against the chattering women, as the only way he could manage to break into their constant babbling was to toot a toy horn.

Stephanie Edwards was the hostess for the all-female version of the show in 1981 and 1982. Producer Chuck Barris originally had filmed the pilot for sale to the NBC network, but later bought back the rights and syndicated the show. A sampling of the guests from one show were TV journalist Shana Alexander, singer/actress Della Reese, and 1966 Playboy Centerfold (and wife of Dick Martin), Dolly Martin.

== See also ==
- Leave it to the Girls - Australian version
