= Bill Monroe (journalist) =

American television journalist

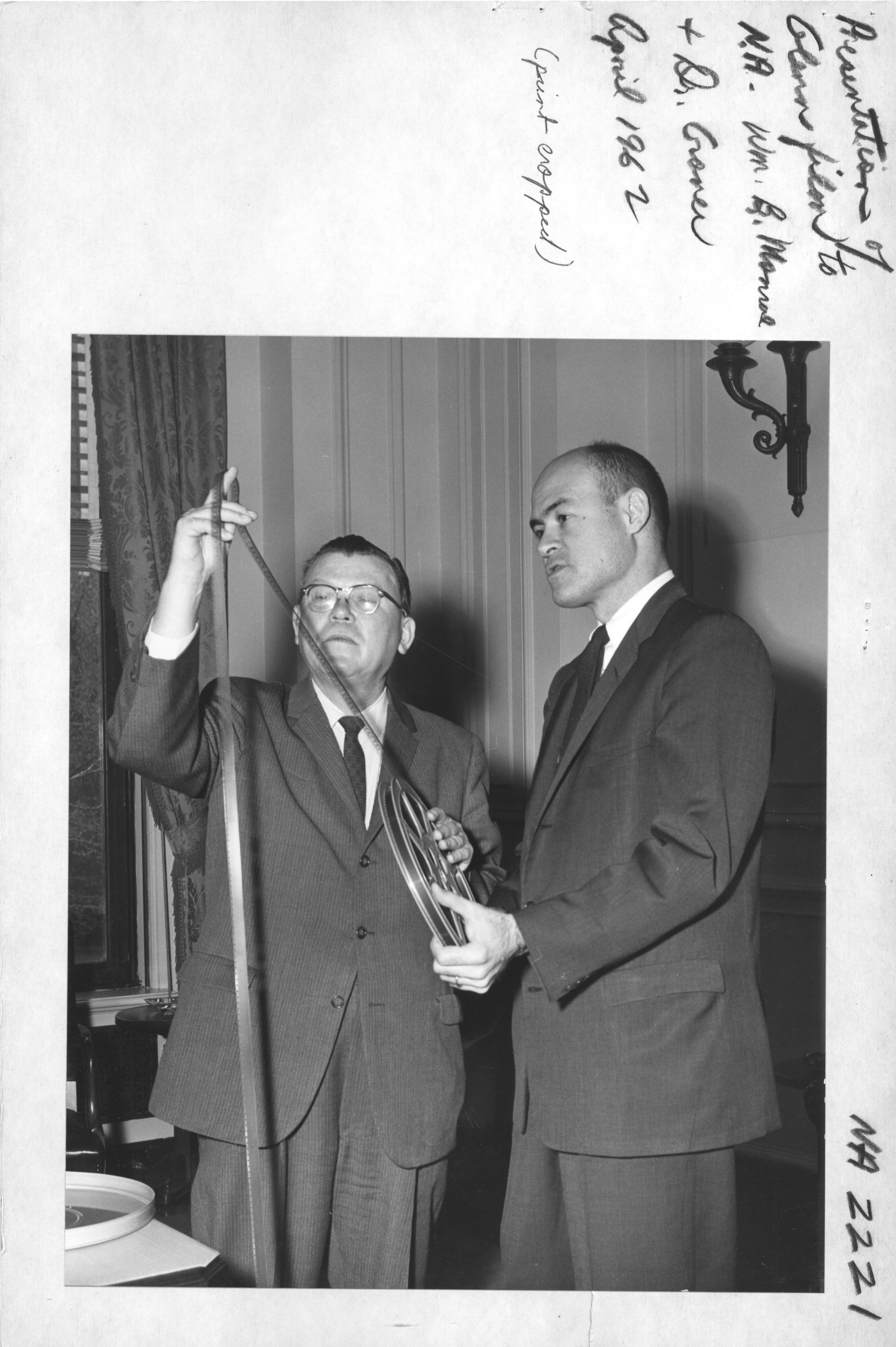
- Bill Monroe (right) with Wayne C. Grover
- Born: William Blanc Monroe Jr. July 17, 1920; New Orleans, Louisiana, U.S.
- Died: February 17, 2011 (aged 90); Potomac, Maryland, U.S.
- Occupations: TV journalist, TV executive producer

William Blanc Monroe Jr. (July 17, 1920 – February 17, 2011) was an American television journalist for NBC News. He was the executive producer and fourth moderator of the NBC public affairs program Meet the Press (1975–84), succeeding Lawrence E. Spivak, the program's co-founder and third moderator.

== Life and career ==
Monroe was born in New Orleans, Louisiana and graduated from Tulane University there in 1942. During World War II, Monroe served in the United States Army Air Forces in Europe.

Early in his career, Monroe served as the first news director for WDSU-TV, an NBC affiliate, in his hometown of New Orleans. In 1959, Monroe's team at WDSU-TV won a George Foster Peabody Award. His news reporting on NBC's Today show, won a Peabody in 1973. He was also a prominent figure in arguing for greater press access to courtrooms and legislative chambers. For some years prior to his assuming the moderator's chair, Monroe served as one of four regular weekly panelists on Meet the Press. He also served as Washington bureau chief for NBC and frequently reported for The Today Show, for which he won a Peabody in 1973. Monroe retired from NBC in 1986, but subsequently held several other jobs including ombudsman for the "Stars and Stripes", the media platform serving the U.S. military overseas.

Monroe was injured in a fall in December 2010, and died from complications of hypertension on February 17, 2011, at a nursing home in Potomac, Maryland, aged 90

== Accolades ==
- 1978: Paul White Award, Radio Television Digital News Association

Preceded by Lawrence E. Spivak	Meet the Press Moderator; November 16, 1975 – September 9, 1984	Succeeded by Roger Mudd and Marvin Kalb
