= Say It with Acting =

US television game show aired in 1951 and 1952

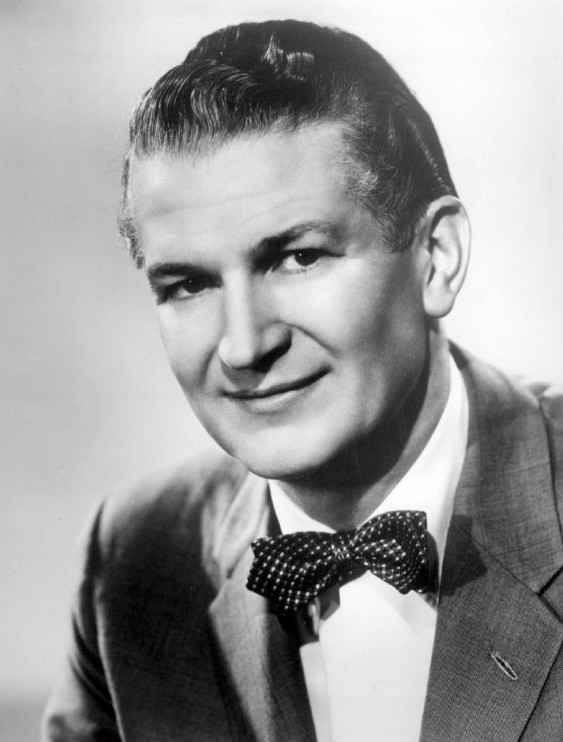
- Bud Collyer, a team captain
- Genre: Game show (charades)
- Presented by: Ben Grauer
- Starring: Bud Collyer; Maggi McNellis
- Country of origin: United States
- Original language: English

Production
- Running time: 30 minutes

Original release
- Network: NBC; ABC
- Release: January 8, 1951 – May 1951
- Release: August 1951 – February 22, 1952

Say It With Acting is an American television game show that was broadcast on NBC from January 8, 1951, until May 1951, and on ABC from August 1951 until February 22, 1952.

== Background ==
The program began in January 1949 as a local show, Look Ma, I'm Acting, on WNBT-TV in New York City. It was the first TV program for which Bill Cullen was host. For each scene performed by actors, a viewer was called and asked to describe the scene in a single word, with a prize given for a correct answer. On February 20, 1949, the NBC network began to carry the show, with the new title Act It Out. It ran until August 7, 1949.

== Format ==
Say It With Acting pitted two teams against each other in charades competition. Bud Collyer and Maggi McNellis were team captains each week. Ben Grauer was the host. Each four-member team consisted of actors and actresses from a current Broadway play, and the winning team returned the following week to face a new opponent. Players' pantomimes had to communicate "tough sayings, or titles of books, plays, songs—things like 'The Dreadful Dragon of Hungry Hill,' 'Neurotic You and Psychopathic Me,' or 'As fluffy as a fleecy cloud.'" Teams competed against the clock, with the team that used less time being the winner.

== Sponsor and schedule ==
Brown Shoe Company's Naturalizer division sponsored Say It With Acting from 6:30 to 7 o'clock on Saturday nights on NBC. The show alternated weekly with Smilin' Ed McConnell's program. After it moved to ABC, it was broadcast on Friday nights from 7:30 to 8 o'clock, alternating weekly with Life with Linkletter.
