= Ned Brooks =

American journalist (died 1969)

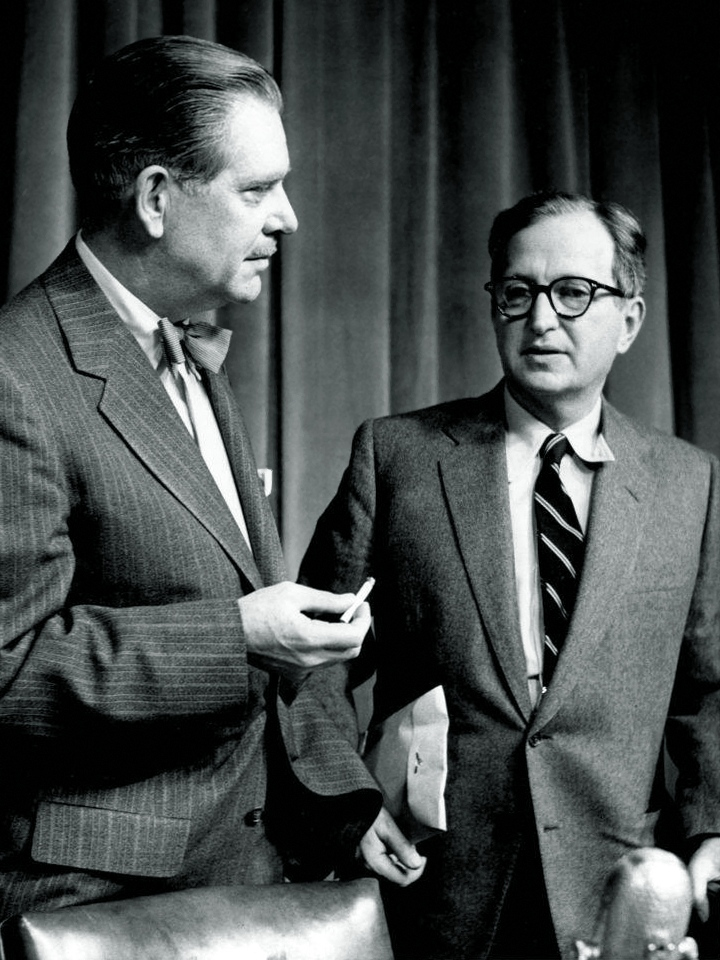
- Brooks (left) with Lawrence Spivak, 1960
- Born: Kansas City, Missouri, U.S.
- Died: April 13, 1969 (aged 68)
- Occupation: Journalist
- Known for: Meet the Press
- Spouse: Mary Jeannot
- Children: 1

Ned Brooks (died April 13, 1969) was an American television and radio journalist who was moderator of NBC's Meet the Press on television from 1953 until 1965, and earlier on radio. Brooks is the second-longest tenured moderator of the program, after Tim Russert.

== Early life ==
Ned Brooks was born on August 13, 1901, in Kansas City, Missouri. He grew up in Warren, Ohio. He attended public schools in Warren. He graduated in 1924 from the journalism school at Ohio State University. He was a member of Phi Kappa Tau fraternity.

== Career ==
Brooks was reporter, city editor and managing editor of Youngstown (Ohio) Telegram. He also reported for the Ohio State Journal. In 1932, he moved to Washington, D.C., and worked on Scripps–Howard newspapers. He covered Congress for the newspaper until 1947. He joined the National Broadcasting Company and worked on the Three-Star Extra radio program. He was a moderator for the television and radio program Meet the Press. He retired in 1967. He was chairman of the standing committee of correspondents in Washington, D.C. He helped organize the Raymond Clapper Memorial Association.

Brooks wrote two books, Winning the Pacific and Inventory of America.

== Personal life ==
Brooks married Mary Jeannot of Marysville, Ohio. He had one daughter, Mrs. Francis B. Donovan Jr. He lived in Chevy Chase, Maryland.

Brooks died on April 13, 1969, aged 68, at a hospital in Washington, D.C., or Maryland, sources differ.

Preceded by Martha Rountree	Meet the Press Moderator; November 8, 1953 – December 26, 1965	Succeeded by Lawrence E. Spivak
