= Eloise Salutes the Stars =

- Genre: Talk show
- Presented by: Eloise McElhone
- Country of origin: United States
- Original language: English
- No. of seasons: 1
- No. of episodes: 26

Production
- Producer: Lester Lewis
- Camera setup: Multi-camera
- Running time: 15 minutes
- Production company: Lester Lewis Productions

Original release
- Network: DuMont/WABD
- Release: October 1950 – April 1951

Eloise Salutes the Stars is a talk show hosted by Eloise McElhone which aired on an 8-station network including the DuMont flagship station WABD. The series started on WABD in November 1949. The series aired Tuesdays at 7:30pm ET in 1950 and early 1951. Other stations in the network such as WXEL-TV in Cleveland showed the series on Thursdays at 7:30pm ET, and other stations, such as WPIX-TV chose to air the show at 5:15pm ET.

The show was sponsored by Doeskin Tissues, and produced by Lester Lewis (1913-1988). After the original 13 episodes were produced, the show was renewed for another 13 episodes in January 1951.

McElhone was also host of the DuMont series Quick on the Draw, a panelist on the ABC game show Think Fast, and a panelist on the NBC/ABC series Leave It to the Girls.

== Episode status ==
Two episodes are held in the J. Fred MacDonald collection at the Library of Congress. One is held at the UCLA Film & Television Archive.

== Bibliography ==
- David Weinstein, The Forgotten Network: DuMont and the Birth of American Television (Philadelphia: Temple University Press, 2004) ISBN 1-59213-245-6
- Alex McNeil, Total Television, Fourth edition (New York: Penguin Books, 1980) ISBN 0-14-024916-8
- Tim Brooks and Earle Marsh, The Complete Directory to Prime Time Network TV Shows, Third edition (New York: Ballantine Books, 1964) ISBN 0-345-31864-1

== See also ==
- List of programs broadcast by the DuMont Television Network
- List of surviving DuMont Television Network broadcasts
