= Marvin Kalb =

American academic

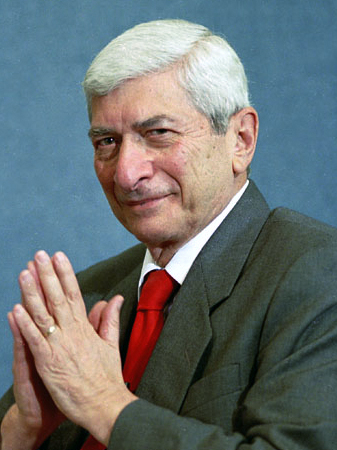
- Kalb in 2001
- Born: Marvin Leonard Kalb; June 9, 1930 (age 95); New York City, New York, U.S.
- Education: City College of New York (BA); Harvard University (MA)
- Occupations: News analyst; Author; Senior fellow of the Shorenstein Center; Moderator of The Kalb Report; Senior adviser at Pulitzer Center on Crisis Reporting
- Notable credit(s): Moderator of Meet the Press, founding director, Shorenstein Center
- Relatives: Bernard Kalb (brother)

Marvin Leonard Kalb (born June 9, 1930) is an American journalist. He was the founding director of the Shorenstein Center on Media, Politics and Public Policy and Edward R. Murrow Professor of Press and Public Policy from 1987 to 1999. The Shorenstein Center and the Kennedy School are part of Harvard University. Kalb is currently a James Clark Welling Fellow at George Washington University and a member of the Atlantic Community Advisory Board.

== Career ==
Kalb spent 30 years as an award-winning reporter for CBS News and NBC News. Kalb was the last newsman recruited by Edward R. Murrow to join CBS News, becoming part of the later generation of the "Murrow Boys." His work at CBS landed him on Richard Nixon's "enemies list". At NBC, he served as chief diplomatic correspondent and host of Meet the Press. During many years of Kalb's tenures at CBS and NBC, his brother Bernard worked alongside him.

Kalb has authored or coauthored many nonfiction books and two best-selling novels (In the National Interest and The Last Ambassador).

Kalb hosts The Kalb Report, a monthly discussion of media ethics and responsibility at the National Press Club in Washington, D.C. sponsored by George Washington University. He was a news analyst for Fox News, and is a contributor to National Public Radio and America Abroad. He is a senior adviser at the Pulitzer Center on Crisis Reporting.

== Haunting Legacy ==
In Haunting Legacy: Vietnam and the American Presidency from Ford to Obama (Brookings Institution Press 2011), Marvin Kalb collaborated with his daughter, Deborah Kalb, in an attempt to present a history of presidential decision-making on one crucial issue: in light of the Vietnam experience, under what circumstances should the United States go to war? The Kalbs participated in a webcast interview of the book at the Pritzker Military Library on October 27, 2011.

== Partial bibliography ==
- Assignment Russia: Becoming a Foreign Correspondent in the Crucible of the Cold War (2021), Brookings Institution Press, ISBN 978-0815738961
- Enemy of the People: Trump's War on the Press, the New McCarthyism, and the Threat to American Democracy (2018), Brookings Institution Press, ISBN 978-0815735304
- The Year I Was Peter the Great: 1956—Khrushchev, Stalin’s Ghost, and a Young American in Russia (2017), Brookings Institution Press, ISBN 9780815731610
- Imperial Gamble: Putin, Ukraine, and the New Cold War (2015), Brookings Institution Press, ISBN 978-0-8157-2664-7.
- The Road to War: Presidential Commitments Honored and Betrayed (2013), Brookings Institution Press, ISBN 978-0-8157-2493-3.
- Haunting Legacy: Vietnam and the American Presidency from Ford to Obama (2011), Brookings Institution Press, ISBN 978-0-8157-2131-4.
- The Media and the War on Terrorism (2003), Brookings Institution Press, ISBN 978-0-8157-3581-6.
- One Scandalous Story: Clinton, Lewinsky, and Thirteen Days That Tarnished American Journalism (2001, ISBN 0-684-85939-4)
- The Nixon Memo: Political Respectability, Russia, and the Press (1994, ISBN 0-226-42299-2)
- The Last Ambassador (1981, ISBN 0-316-48222-6)
- In the National Interest (1977, ISBN 0-671-22656-8)
- Kissinger (1974, ISBN 978-0316482219)
- Roots of Involvement: the U.S. in Asia, 1784–1971 (1971, ISBN 0-393-05440-3)
- Dragon in the Kremlin: A Report on the Russian-Chinese Alliance (1961)

Media offices
Preceded by Bill Monroe	Meet the Press Moderator; September 16, 1984 – May 3, 1987 (Co-Anchor with Roger Mudd until 1985)	Succeeded by Chris Wallace
