= Lawrence Spivak =

American journalist and Meet the Press host

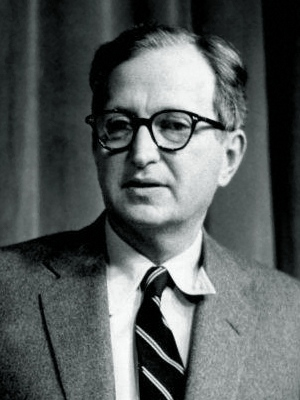
- Spivak in 1960
- Born: Lawrence Edmund Spivak; June 11, 1900; New York City, U.S.
- Died: March 9, 1994 (aged 93); Washington, D.C., U.S.
- Education: Harvard University
- Occupations: Broadcast journalist Publisher
- Spouse: Charlotte Beir Ring (m. 1924; died 1983)
- Children: 2

Lawrence Edmund Spivak (June 11, 1900 – March 9, 1994) was an American publisher and journalist who was best known as the co-founder, producer and host of the prestigious public affairs program Meet the Press. He and journalist Martha Rountree founded the program as promotion for Spivak's magazine, The American Mercury, and it became the longest-running continuous network series in television history. During his 28 years as panelist and moderator of Meet the Press, Spivak was known for his pointed questioning of policy makers.

== Life and career ==
Lawrence E. Spivak was born June 11, 1900, in the New York City borough of Brooklyn. In 1921 he graduated cum laude from Harvard University and began his career in publishing as business manager for Antiques magazine. He married psychologist Charlotte Beir Ring in 1924, and together they had two children. From 1930 to 1933 Spivak worked for Hunting and Fishing and National Sportsman magazines, as circulation director and assistant to the publisher.

=== The American Mercury ===
In 1934 Spivak became business manager for The American Mercury, a literary magazine that critiqued the American scene, while it was edited by journalist H. L. Mencken. Spivak purchased the magazine in 1939. He served as its editor from 1944 to 1950 when he sold it.

In 1937 Spivak founded Mercury Publications, Inc., a publishing company with imprints including American Mercury Books, Mercury Mysteries, Bestseller Mysteries and Jonathan Press Mysteries. Spivak published inexpensive digest-sized paperback editions, often abridged, of works by authors including Margery Allingham, Agatha Christie, Erle Stanley Gardner, Dashiell Hammett, Ellery Queen, Georges Simenon, Rex Stout and Cornell Woolrich. Mercury Publications also included such periodicals as Ellery Queen's Mystery Magazine, The Magazine of Fantasy & Science Fiction, The Book of Wit and Humor and Detective: The Magazine of True Crime Cases. Spivak sold his interest in Mercury Publications in 1954.

=== Meet the Press ===
In 1945, Spivak and journalist Martha Rountree created and co-produced the weekly public affairs program Meet the Press as radio promotion for The American Mercury. A television edition began on NBC in November 1947, and separate shows continued until the radio version ceased in 1950. Spivak purchased Rountree's interest in the program in 1953.

Spivak sold Meet the Press to NBC in 1955 but remained as moderator, producer and panelist. He retired November 9, 1975, after a special one-hour broadcast that featured President Gerald R. Ford and marked the 28th anniversary of Meet the Press on television. Spivak continued to be a consultant to NBC until 1989, and made his last Meet the Press appearance in 1983.

"All received equal treatment," Arthur Unger of The Christian Science Monitor wrote of the presidents and world leaders who were questioned by the Meet the Press panelist. "They had to face up to Lawrence Spivak of the fierce visage, the challenging questions, the fearless independence, the utter fairness. And beneath it all, the scowling good nature of a man with an unrelenting mission: to evince accurate information from the very mouths of the individuals who make the news."

Spivak was distinguished by his rather dapper appearance, his wardrobe usually including a bowtie and heavy-rimmed glasses. He first appeared as the one permanent member of the program's panel of reporters, asking the first round of questions. As moderator, he asked the first question of the Meet the Press guest and then handed off to the other journalists on the panel, which usually totaled four during his 28 years as the host and moderator of the TV program.

=== Later years ===
From 1985 to 1994, Spivak co-produced PBS television programs for the Southern Center for International Studies.

Spivak's office was at the Sheraton-Park Hotel in Washington, D.C., which was also his home. He was widowed in 1983. Spivak died of congestive heart failure at Washington's Sibley Memorial Hospital on March 9, 1994, at the age of 93.

=== Honors and recognition ===
Spivak was the recipient of two Peabody Awards, two Emmy Awards from the National Academy of Television Arts and Sciences, the Associated Press Broadcasters' Robert Eunson Award, the Mass Media Award of the Institute of Human Relations of the American Jewish Committee, the United States Conference of Mayors' Award, and the Christopher Award. He was inducted into the Hall of Fame of the Washington chapter of Sigma Delta Chi, and was the recipient of the Golden Plate Award of the American Academy of Achievement in 1968.

== In popular culture ==
Spivak was portrayed by Colin Stinton in the Netflix series The Crown, in the episode "Bubbikins". The interview of Prince Philip on Meet the Press that is shown in the episode originally aired on November 9, 1969.

Preceded by Ned Brooks	Meet the Press Moderator; January 16, 1966 – November 9, 1975	Succeeded by Bill Monroe
