= Martha Rountree =

American broadcast journalist

- Born: Martha Jane Rountree; October 23, 1911; Gainesville, Florida, United States
- Died: August 23, 1999 (aged 87); Washington, D.C., United States
- Occupations: Broadcast journalist, entrepreneur
- Known for: Founding Meet the Press

Martha Jane Rountree (October 23, 1911 – August 23, 1999) was an American pioneering broadcast journalist and entrepreneur. She was the creator and first moderator of a public-affairs program, first on radio as The American Mercury from June 24, 1945 to 1947, and as Meet the Press on the NBC television network from November 6, 1947 to November 1, 1953. Until Kristen Welker took over on September 17, 2023, Rountree was the only female moderator in the seven-decade history of the show.

== Early years ==
Born in Gainesville, Florida, Martha Jane Rountree was raised in Columbia, South Carolina. Her father Earl was in sales, at times in real estate, and at other times, automobile sales, but he was not successful. He died when Martha was 16, and as she later told a reporter, "he left us with absolutely nothing." In order to pay her way through the University of South Carolina (USC), she worked for the Columbia Record newspaper. She left USC without graduating and took a job as a reporter with The Tampa Tribune in Florida.

== Early years in New York ==
In 1938, she moved to New York City from Tampa and worked as a freelance writer. In 1944, she and her sister Ann founded a production company, Radio House, which prepared singing commercials and transcribed programs. One of their ideas was produced by the Mutual Broadcasting System in 1945; it was Leave It to the Girls, which had a panel of one man asking women celebrities questions that had been sent in by viewers. In 1946, eleven years after Lawrence E. Spivak purchased the magazine The American Mercury, she sent in an unsolicited article which was published. From 1947 to 1954, she worked as a roving editor for the periodical. Because of her experience in radio, Spivak asked for her critique of a radio show he used to promote The American Mercury.

== Launching of Meet the Press ==
Based on her strong criticism of Spivak's self-promoting program, Rountree created a new radio show, which she called The American Mercury Presents: Meet the Press, debuting on June 24, 1945. On November 6, 1947, while still on Mutual radio, it was subsequently reincarnated on the NBC television network and renamed Meet the Press. Contrary to the claims of others concerning the program's creator, Rountree developed the idea on her own, and Spivak joined as co-producer and business partner in the enterprise after the show had already debuted.

== After Meet the Press ==
While still moderating Meet the Press, Rountree also hosted Keep Posted, a discussion program for the DuMont TV network (renamed The Big Issue after The Saturday Evening Post withdrew its sponsorship) from 1951 through 1954.

In 1953, she sold her shares of Meet the Press and The Big Issue to Spivak for $125,000, reportedly after a coin-toss, and left her job at Meet the Press.

Rountree started the magazine Know the Facts in 1955. In the same year, she established the radio station WKTF in Northern Virginia.

She returned to television in the summer of 1956 as the moderator of Press Conference (later retitled Martha Rountree’s Press Conference), which was similar in format to Meet the Press. In the 60s, she served as Washington correspondent for New York's WOR radio and other stations.

In 1965, Rountree founded the Leadership Foundation, a conservative, non-profit, public-affairs organization in Washington, D.C. She was a member of the National Press Club (founded 1908) and the Women's National Press Club (founded 1919).

Her first marriage was to Albert N. Williams, Jr. in 1941. The marriage lasted seven years and ended in divorce in 1948. In 1952, she married Oliver M. Presbrey, an advertising-agency executive. He died in 1988.

She covered national conventions in the 1950s and 1960s, appeared as a guest on the Phil Donahue television talk show, led a national campaign in support of school prayer and testified before the 1988 Republican National Convention's Platform Committee. A popular Washington hostess, she included many cabinet members, members of Congress and their wives among her friends.

Rountree founded Leadership Foundation, a 501(c)3 entity (educational), and Leadership Action, a 501(c)4 entity (lobbying), located on MacArthur Boulevard, in Cabin John, MD - near her home on Comanche Court in Bethesda, Maryland, in the suburbs of Washington, DC where she lived with Presbrey.

The board of directors and advisory board of Leadership Foundation included some of the leading political figures of her era.

The foundation published the Leadership Action Alert political newsletter, which was mailed on a regular basis to its thousands of members across the country. It also served as the umbrella foundation for special projects, such as the National Center for Pan-American Studies (NCPAS), a group chaired by Joseph Quinn, which created a political youth leadership exchange program between students in Latin America and the United States. The NCPAS was a member group of the IYY Commission (International Youth Year, a UN sponsored program) as well as a participant in the White House Working Group on Central America. Rountree's relationship with the Reagan White House was a close one.

In her later years, Rountree's vision grew quite feeble. Only her closest friends were aware that her many years in the bright klieg lights of television had taken its toll on her physical vision.

Rountree won a Peabody Award for her role as co-founder and producer of Meet the Press.

Rountree died in Washington, DC, from complications of Alzheimer's disease aged 87.

== Assessments ==
"I think of Martha as one of the most creative women I’ve ever known,” opined Liz Carpenter, the former White House staff director and press secretary of Lady Bird Johnson. “She won a wide audience by initiating a thoughtful debate of issues on the air before it became commonplace.”

Mrs. William Randolph Hearst described Rountree as “a diesel engine under a lace handkerchief.”

== Notes ==
- Ware, Susan & Stacey Lorraine Braukman. 2004. Notable American Women:A Biographical Dictionary Completing the 20th Century, Harvard University Press.
- Nimmo, Dan D. & Chevelle Newsome (1997). "Martha Rountree and Lawrence E. Spivak". Political Commentators in the United States in the 20th Century: A Bio-Critical Sourcebook. Westport, Conn.: Greenwood Press. pp. 309–17. ISBN 0-313-29585-9.

First	Meet the Press Moderator; November 6, 1947 – November 1, 1953	Succeeded by Ned Brooks
