= Meet the Press =

American news television program

- Genre: Public affairs News analysis
- Created by: Martha Rountree; Lawrence Spivak
- Directed by: Rob Melick
- Presented by: Kristen Welker (for past moderators, see section)
- Narrated by: Fred Facey; Bert Pence; Dennis Haysbert
- Theme music composer: John Williams
- Opening theme: "The Pulse of Events" (fourth part of The Mission)
- Country of origin: United States
- Original language: English
- No. of seasons: 77
- No. of episodes: 4,946+

Production
- Executive producer: David P. Gelles
- Production locations: NBC News Washington Bureau, Capitol Hill, Washington, D.C.
- Camera setup: Multi-camera
- Running time: 30 minutes (1947–1992); 60 minutes (1992–present)
- Production company: NBC News Productions

Original release
- Network: NBC
- Release: November 6, 1947 – present

Meet the Press, also known as Meet the Press with Kristen Welker, is a weekly American television Sunday morning talk show broadcast on NBC. It is the longest-running program on American television, though its format has changed since the debut episode on November 6, 1947. Meet the Press specializes in interviews with leaders in Washington, D.C., across the country, and around the world on issues of politics, economics, foreign policy, and other public affairs, along with panel discussions that provide opinions and analysis. In January 2021, production moved to NBC's bureau on Capitol Hill in Washington, D.C.

The longevity of Meet the Press is attributable in part to the fact that the program debuted during what was only the second official "network television season" for American television. It was the first live television network news program on which a sitting president of the United States appeared; this occurred on its broadcast on November 9, 1975, which featured Gerald Ford. The program has been hosted by 13 moderators, beginning with co-creator Martha Rountree. The show's current moderator is Kristen Welker, who became moderator in September 2023 following longtime moderator Chuck Todd's departure.

Meet the Press airs Sundays from 9:00 a.m.–10:00 a.m. ET on NBC, 10:30 a.m.–11:30 a.m. ET in New York and Washington. Meet the Press is also occasionally pre-empted by network coverage of sports events held outside the United States. The program is syndicated by Westwood One to various radio stations around the United States and is on C-SPAN Radio as part of its replays of the Sunday morning talk shows.

== Format ==
Each episode consists of an extended one-on-one interview with the host, sometimes followed by a roundtable discussion or one-on-two interview with figures in adversarial positions, either Congressional members from opposite sides of the aisle or political commentators. A half-hour program for the first 45 years of its history, the show was expanded to 60 minutes starting with the broadcast on September 20, 1992.

The program also features in-depth examinations of facts behind political and general news stories (particularly as part of a segment called the "Data Download", introduced after Chuck Todd assumed duties as moderator, which is conducted on a touchscreen within the main set).

== History ==
Meet the Press set, November 1975. On this broadcast, a sitting American president (Gerald Ford) was, for the first time, a guest on a live television network news program.

Meet the Press began on radio on the Mutual Broadcasting System in 1945 as American Mercury Presents: Meet the Press, a program to promote The American Mercury, a magazine that Lawrence Spivak purchased in 1935. Before the program aired, Spivak had asked journalist Martha Rountree, who had worked in radio and had been employed by Spivak as a roving editor for the magazine, to critique plans for a new radio show. As a result, Rountree created a new radio program that she called The American Mercury, on October 5, 1945.

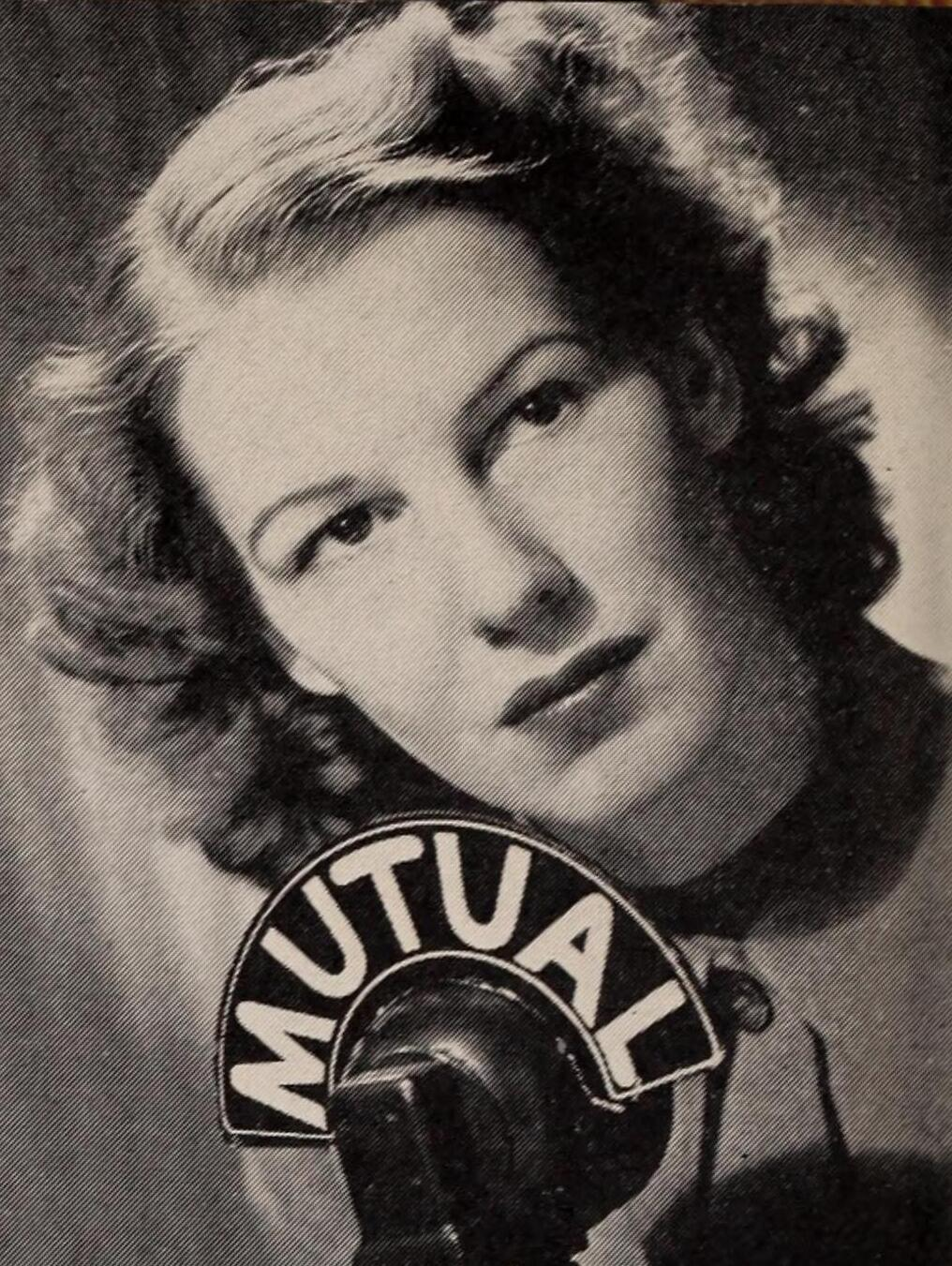
Martha Rountree, the first moderator of the program

On November 6, 1947, while still on the Mutual Broadcasting System, the television rights to the program were purchased by General Foods. They began to air the show on the NBC television network with the title shortened to simply Meet the Press. The radio version then adopted the new name.

Although some sources credit Spivak with the program's creation, Rountree developed the idea on her own, and Spivak joined as co-producer and business partner in the enterprise after the show had already debuted.

Meet the Press was originally presented as a 30-minute press conference with a single guest and a panel of questioners. Its first guest was James Farley, who served as Postmaster General, Democratic National Committee chairman and campaign manager to Franklin Delano Roosevelt under the first two terms of the New Deal Administration. Martha Rountree served as its first host, the program's only female moderator until 2023. She stepped down on November 1, 1953, and was succeeded by Ned Brooks, who remained as moderator until his retirement on December 26, 1965. Spivak became the moderator on January 1, 1966, moving up from his role as a permanent panelist. He retired on November 9, 1975, on a special one-hour edition that featured a sitting president as guest for the first time, in this case Gerald Ford. The next week, Bill Monroe, previously a weekly panelist like Spivak had been years before, took over as moderator and stayed until June 2, 1984.

For the next seven and a half years, the program then went through a series of hosts as it struggled in the ratings against ABC's This Week with David Brinkley. Roger Mudd and Marvin Kalb, as co-moderators, followed Monroe for a year, followed by Chris Wallace (who would later go on to a much longer run as host of the rival program Fox News Sunday) from 1987 to 1988. Garrick Utley, then hosting Weekend Today, concurrently hosted Meet the Press from 1989 through December 1, 1991. All this occurred despite the increasing ratings of NBC News' other programs (and those of the network generally) during that period. The program originally aired at noon Eastern Time every Sunday (leading into NFL Live incongruously in the fall) before moving to a 9:00 a.m. slot by the early 1990s when it expanded to an hour.

=== Under Russert ===
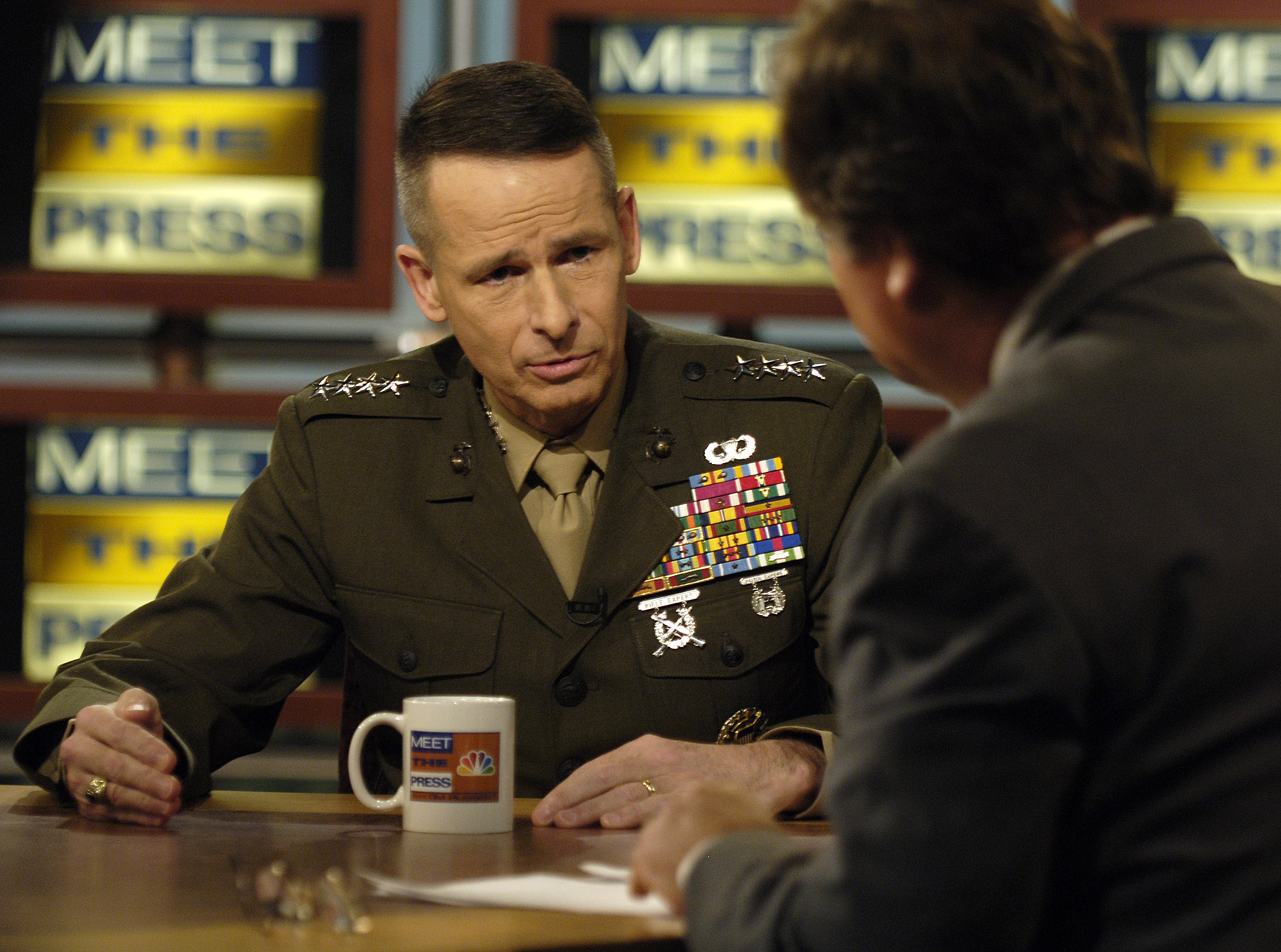
Russert interviews General Peter Pace in 2006.

Network officials, concerned for the show's future, turned to Tim Russert, the network's bureau chief in Washington, D.C. He took over as moderator of Meet the Press on December 8, 1991, and remained with the program until his death on June 13, 2008, becoming the longest-serving moderator in the program's history.

Under Russert, the program was expanded to one hour and became less of a televised press conference, focusing more on Russert's questions and comments, Russert also engaged in longer in-depth interviews and hosted panels of experts to discuss the topics featured in that week's broadcast. Russert signed off each edition by saying, "That's all for today. We'll be back next week. If it's Sunday, it's Meet the Press."

During the professional football season, Russert, a native of Buffalo, New York, and an avid fan of the Buffalo Bills, sometimes added, "Go Bills!", and occasionally would ask panelists, "How 'bout those Sabres?" if Buffalo's NHL hockey team was doing well. Spoofs of the show featured in a recurring sketch on Saturday Night Live often reflected his impromptu additions in support of the two professional sports franchises. By 2006, Meet the Press was the highest-rated program among the Sunday morning talk shows.

On June 13, 2008, Russert died of a sudden coronary thrombosis (caused by a cholesterol plaque rupture). Former NBC Nightly News anchor Tom Brokaw hosted a special edition of Meet the Press dedicated to the life of Russert on June 15, 2008, in which Russert's chair was left empty as a tribute.

=== After Russert ===
Mark Whitaker was named by NBC News as the division's Washington, D.C. Bureau Chief and was given "executive oversight" of Meet the Press.

==== Interim Brokaw era ====
NBC Nightly News anchor Brian Williams acted as moderator of the first show following the tribute to Russert on June 15, 2008, with the same guests and subject matter that Russert was planning for when he died.

Following Russert's death, Tom Brokaw was named the interim moderator through the 2008 general elections. Brokaw followed Russert's tradition by signing off with "We'll be back next Sunday because if it's Sunday, it's Meet the Press" (a sign-off that continues to be used by his successors as moderator). In September of that year, the show was presented with limited commercial interruption.

On August 10, 2008, David Gregory moderated the panel discussion during the second half-hour of the broadcast, while Brokaw anchored the first half-hour from the site of the Summer Olympics in Beijing. The following week on August 17, 2008, he moderated the entire broadcast. On December 1, 2008, it was also reported that the December 7, 2008 broadcast would be Brokaw's last, with Gregory becoming the new permanent host the following Sunday.

=== Under Gregory ===
David Gregory began his tenure as moderator on December 14, 2008. Four days after Gregory's first regular broadcast, on December 18, 2008, NBC News political director Chuck Todd was named contributing editor of Meet the Press. Throughout Gregory's tenure as moderator, Meet the Press experienced significant ratings declines. In the final three months of 2013, the program placed third among the Sunday morning talk shows in total viewership, behind CBS's Face the Nation and ABC's This Week, for the first time since 1992. It also experienced the lowest ratings in the show's entire history among the key 25-to-54 age viewing demographic during this period. NBC management became uncertain as to the future direction of the program.

A new set was introduced on May 2, 2010, featuring video screens and library-style bookshelves, Gregory would preview the guests to be featured during each week's broadcast using a large video screen. Different, modified intro music was also introduced, with the Meet the Press theme music in a shorter "modernized [style]... the beginning repeated with drum beats" (see "High-definition broadcasting" below for additional information).

=== Under Todd ===
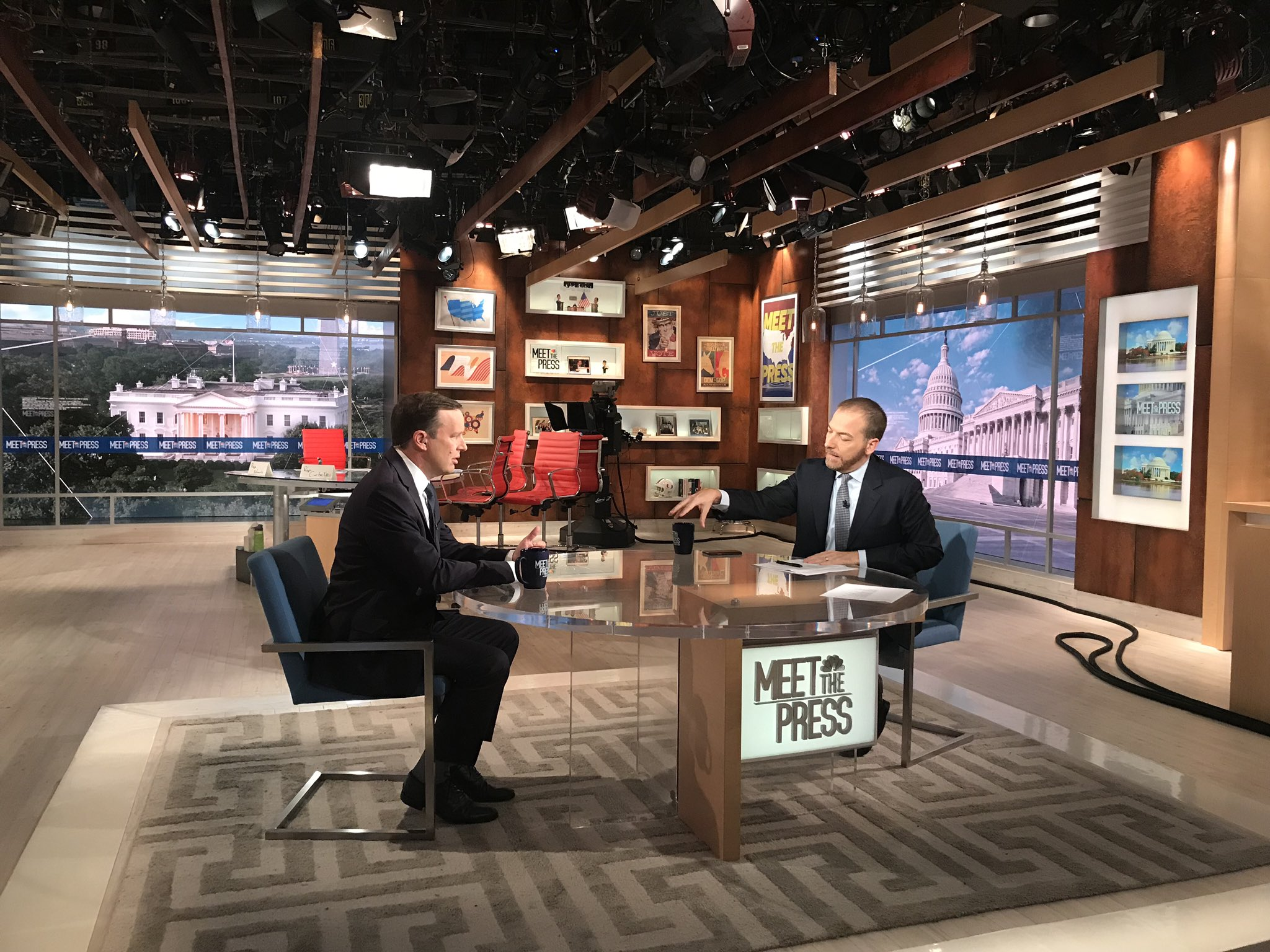
Senator Chris Murphy on Meet the Press

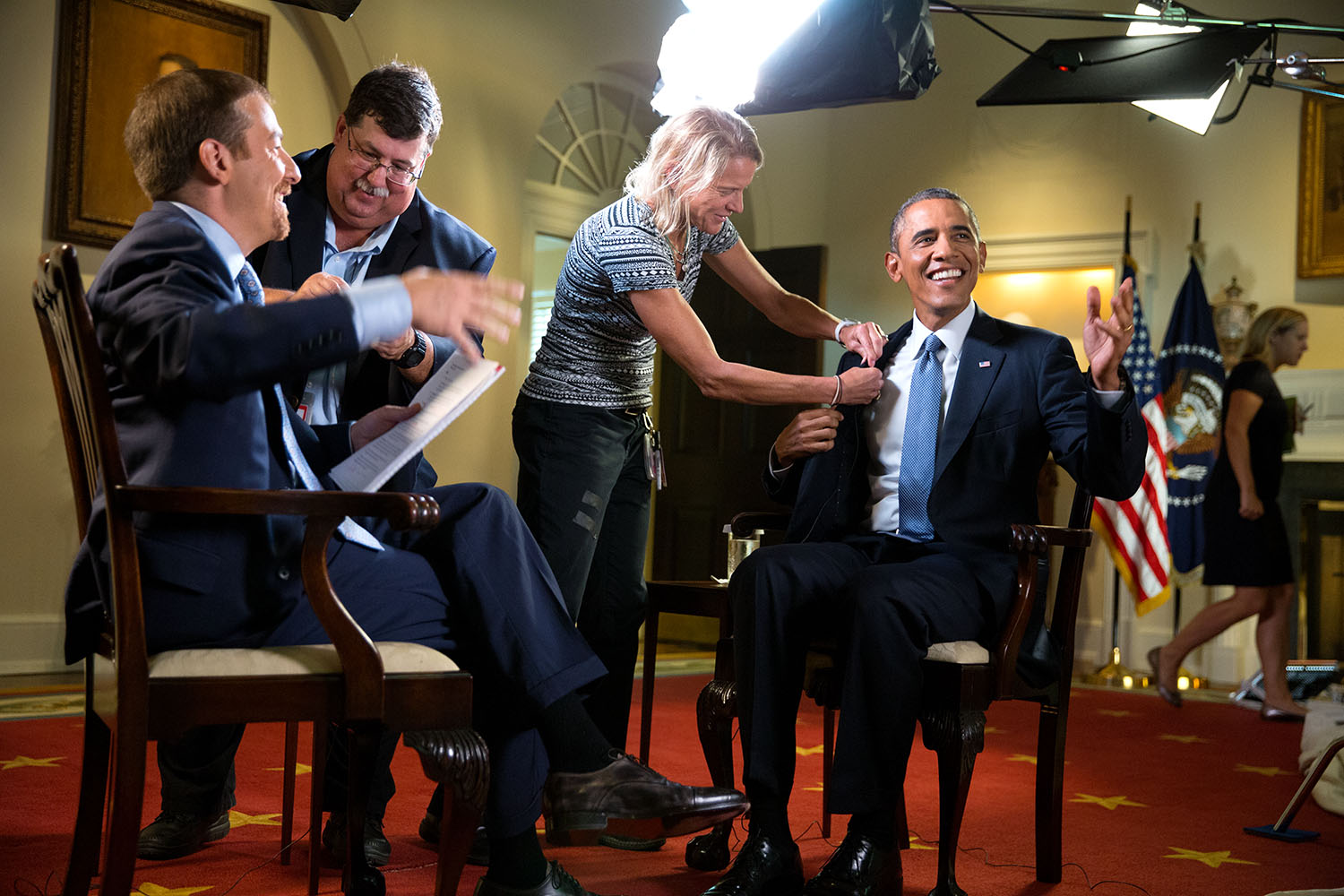
U.S. President Barack Obama participates in an interview with Todd in the Cabinet Room of the White House on September 6, 2014.

In response to declining viewership, rumors surfaced in August 2014 that Gregory would be replaced as the program's moderator. NBC News President Deborah Turness apparently had held discussions with Jon Stewart (then-host of Comedy Central's news comedy program The Daily Show) to replace Gregory, which Stewart later confirmed in a Rolling Stone interview, saying, "My guess is they were casting as wide and as weird a net as they could. I'm sure part of them was thinking, 'Why don't we just make it a variety show?'"

On August 14, 2014, Turness announced that Chuck Todd, NBC's chief White House correspondent and Host of MSNBC's The Daily Rundown, would take over the role of moderator on September 7, 2014. Because of Todd's fanhood, a Los Angeles Dodgers poster became part of the physical format.

==== Meet the Press Now ====
On September 28, 2015, MSNBC premiered MTP Daily, a weekday spin-off also hosted by Todd. It formally replaced The Ed Show as MSNBC's early-evening program after a transitional period following its cancellation. MSNBC explained that the program is meant to "bring the insight and power of Meet the Press to our air every day of the week." By 2022, the show was airing in the 1:00 p.m. Eastern slot, and in May it was announced that the show would be moving from MSNBC to the free streaming platform NBC News Now, and rechristened Meet the Press Now, starting June 6, 2022. The show also returned to an early evening slot of 4:00 p.m. Eastern.

Meet the Press Now
- Genre: Public affairs News analysis
- Presented by: Kristen Welker
- Country of origin: United States
- Original language: English

Production
- Camera setup: Multi-camera

Original release
- Network: MSNBC
- Release: September 28, 2015 – May 25, 2022
- Network: NBC News Now
- Release: June 6, 2022 – present

=== Under Welker ===
On June 4, 2023, Todd announced he would be leaving his role as moderator. Kristen Welker was named as his replacement for the flagship Meet the Press beginning in September, while spin off Meet the Press Now featured rotating guest hosts, with Welker only hosting Meet the Press Now on Thursdays and Fridays. Welker debuted as moderator on September 17, 2023, featuring an interview with Donald Trump. In June 2024, Welker took a month leave of absence because she had welcomed her second child via surrogate on May 30, Peter Alexander filled in for Welker during her absence. In June 2026, Welker went on a 3 week medical leave for surgery. Garrett Haake and Ryan Nobles filled in for Welker during her absence.

=== High-definition broadcasting ===
The set utilized from March 17, 1996 to April 25, 2010, had been designed as an experimental set for high-definition broadcasting, several editions of the program (including the first broadcast of a regular series on a major television network in HD) had aired in the format in the 1990s over experimental HD station WHD-TV in Washington, D.C. Despite this, the program continued to be transmitted in NTSC over the NBC network itself. On May 2, 2010, Meet the Press became the last NBC News program and the third Sunday morning talk show to convert and broadcast in high definition, and unveiled a new set consisting of large video screens mostly used to display Washington scenery, satellite interview subjects and moderator and subject talking points, along with graphics produced for the format.

In January 2021, production of the program moved from WRC-TV facilities in Tenleytown to a ground floor studio in NBC's new Washington, D.C. bureau on Capitol Hill. The move included a new set.

== Moderators ==
The following is the list of moderators for Meet the Press:

Moderator	Date
Martha Rountree	1947–1953
Ned Brooks	1953–1965
Lawrence Spivak	1966–1975
Bill Monroe	1975–1984
Roger Mudd and Marvin Kalb (co-moderators)	1984–1985
Marvin Kalb	1985–1987
Chris Wallace	1987–1988
Garrick Utley	1989–1991
Tim Russert	1991–2008
Tom Brokaw	2008
David Gregory	2008–2014
Andrea Mitchell and Chris Jansing	2014
Chuck Todd	2014–2023
Kristen Welker	2023–present

== Notable guests and events ==
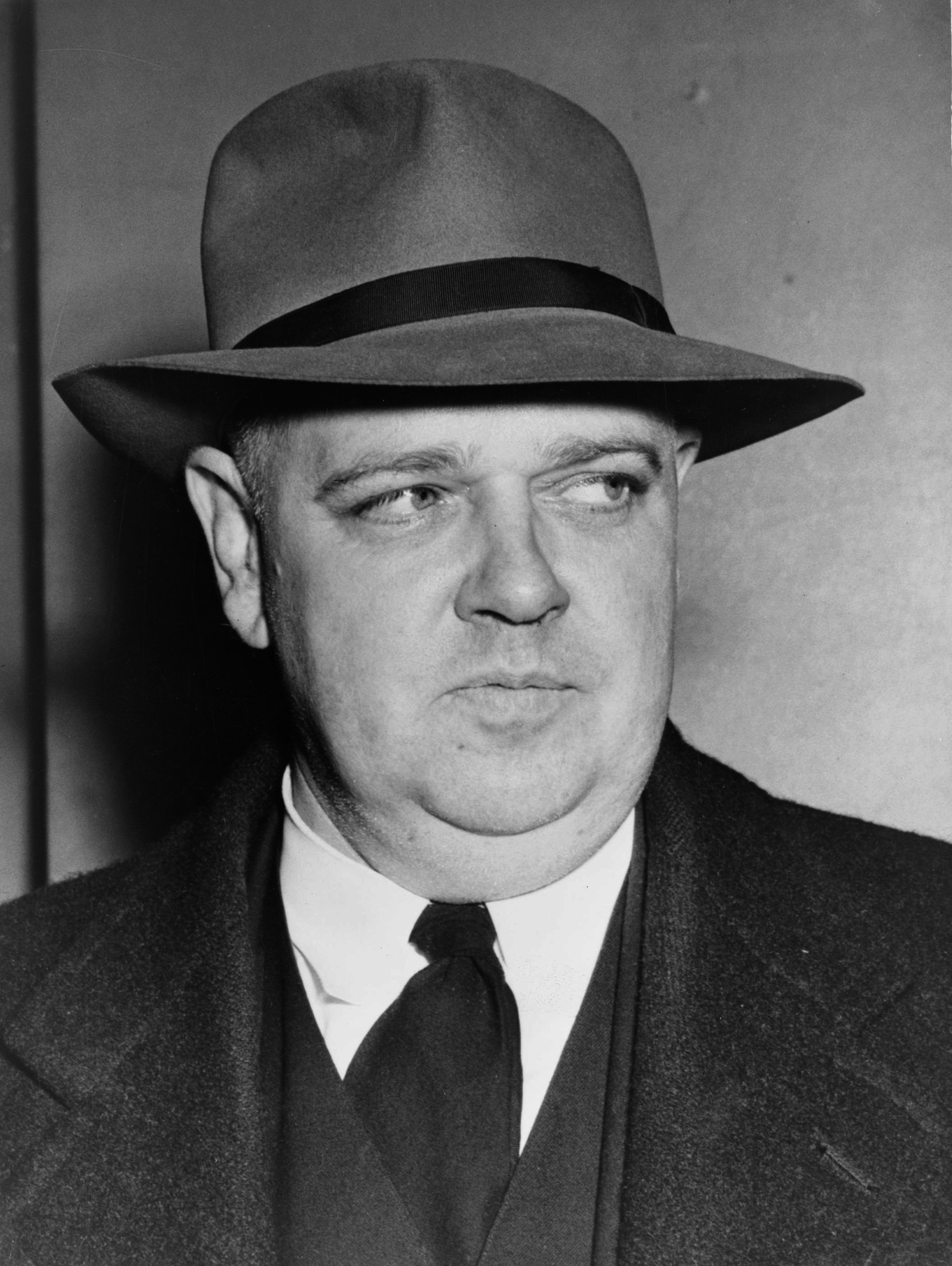
Whittaker Chambers's very first answer on the August 27, 1948, episode, accusing Alger Hiss of being a communist, helped move Meet the Press from radio to television.

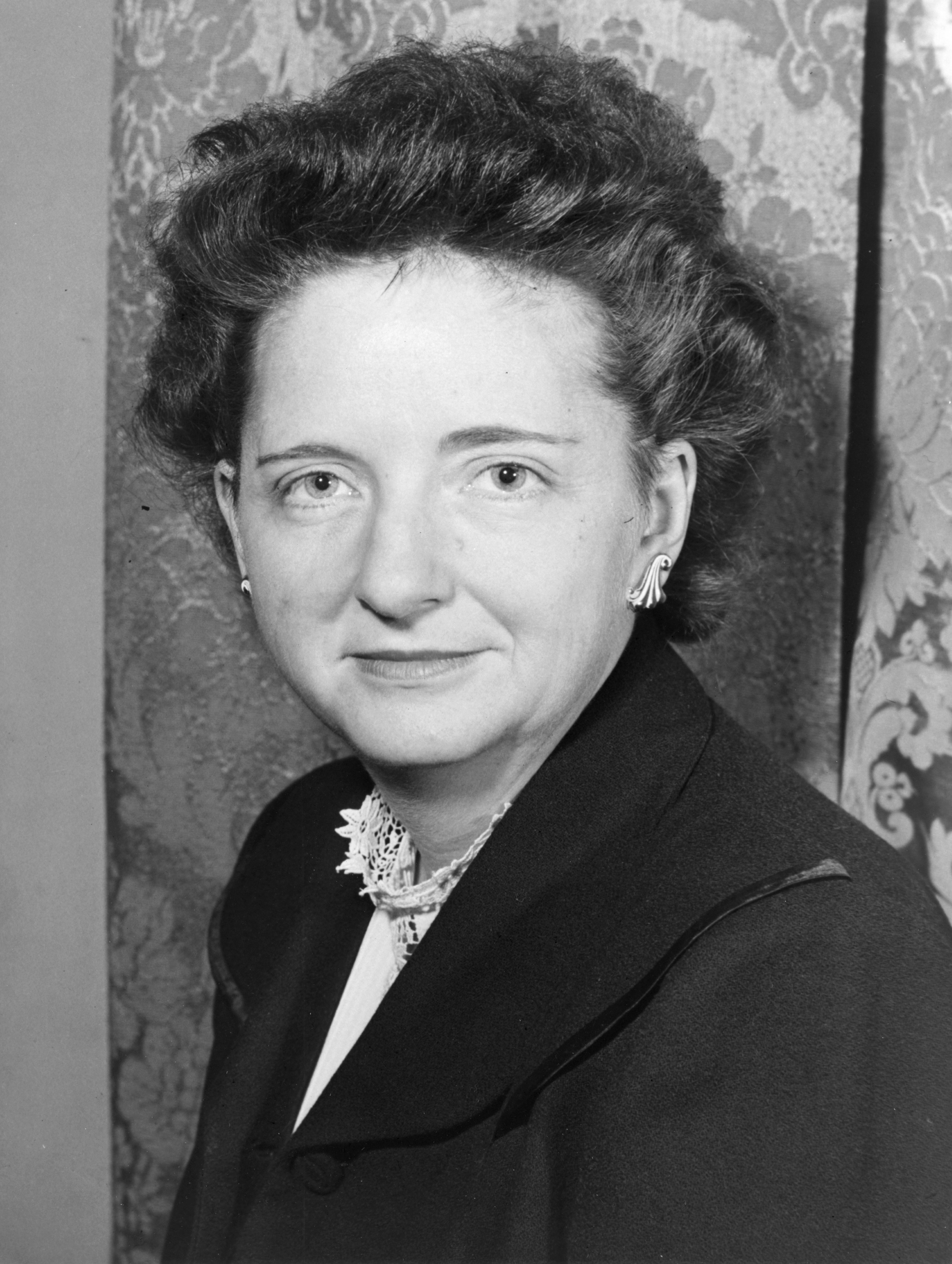
Elizabeth Bentley, a courier for a Communist spy ring, was the first female guest, on the September 12, 1948, episode.

- First guest: James A. Farley, the former Postmaster General of the United States and former Democratic National Committee Chair.
- Whittaker Chambers states Alger Hiss was a communist on the radio broadcast on August 27, 1948, which leads to libel suit from Hiss, the Pumpkin Papers, and Justice's indictment of Hiss by December 1948.
- First female guest: Elizabeth Bentley, a courier for a Communist spy ring, on September 12, 1948.
- An interview with Fidel Castro aired April 19, 1959.
- An interview with Martin Luther King Jr., about the civil rights movement in the United States.
- Every U.S. president since John F. Kennedy has appeared on Meet the Press, although not necessarily during their presidency. Jimmy Carter used his appearance on January 20, 1980, to announce the United States' boycott of the 1980 Summer Olympics. Ronald Reagan appeared seven times before being elected president, but did not appear during his presidency. Bill Clinton was the guest for the 50th anniversary broadcast on November 9, 1997. The interview with George W. Bush was conducted in the Oval Office at the White House on February 8, 2004. The interview was held with then President-elect Barack Obama on December 7, 2008. Donald Trump has appeared on the program a number of times, most recently in June 2026.
- The first live communications satellite television interview occurred on Meet the Press on September 19, 1965, with the British Prime Minister Harold Wilson.
- A special edition of the program aired on Christmas Day 2022 to commemorate its 75th anniversary, consisting entirely of clips from the program archives and brief introductory commentaries by Todd.

== Distribution ==
In addition to its broadcasts on NBC, Meet the Press also airs on various other NBCUniversal-owned channels, including MSNBC, NBC News Now. It is also broadcast in Australia on the Seven Network.

Meet the Press is also available as an audio or video podcast, and is simulcast on radio stations by Westwood One (which also handles distribution of all other NBC-produced radio programming, including NBC News Radio).

Addition to Sunday program, Meet the Press is also available Monday to Friday in NBC YouTube channel and in NBC website named as a Meet the Press Now – airing date.

== Logo history ==
Logo used from 1988 to 1990

Logo used from 1990 to September 3, 1995

Meet the Press logo used from September 10, 1995 to June 8, 2008

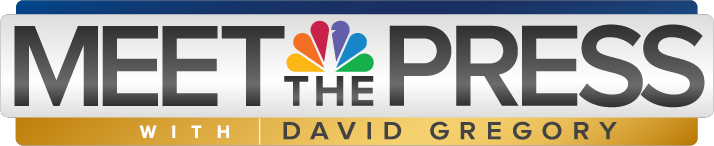
Logo used from May 2, 2010 to August 10, 2014

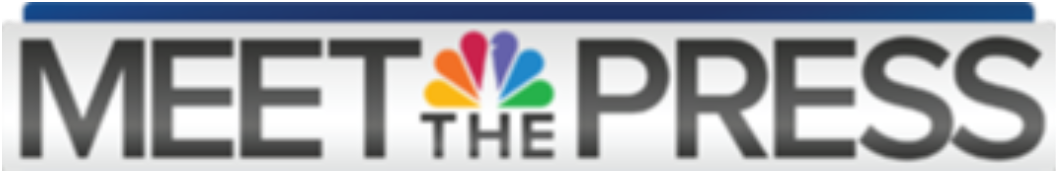
Nameless logo used from August 17, 2014 to August 31, 2014

Meet the Press logo used from May 2, 2010 (introduced under former moderator David Gregory) to November 5, 2017

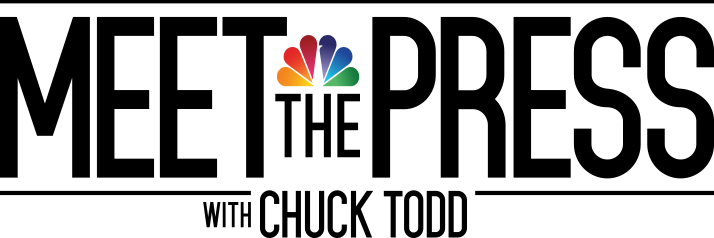
Meet the Press logo used from November 12, 2017 to September 10, 2023

Meet the Press logo introduced on September 17, 2023

== See also ==
- The Mission (theme music)
