= Harlow Wilcox (announcer) =

American radio actor (1900–1960)

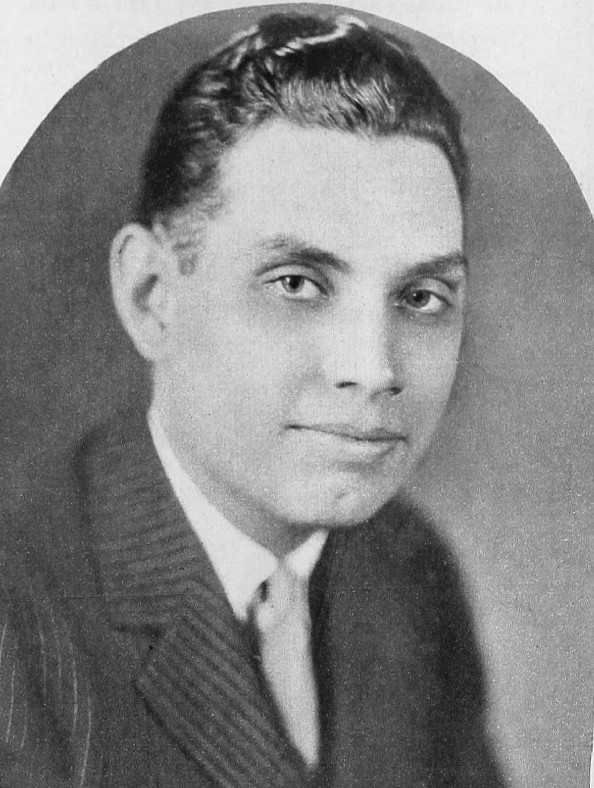
- Wilcox in 1930.
- Born: Harlow Wilcox; March 12, 1900; Omaha, Nebraska
- Died: September 24, 1960 (aged 60); Los Angeles, California
- Occupation: radio announcer

Harlow Wilcox (March 12, 1900 – September 24, 1960) was an American radio announcer.

Wilcox became one of the most successful announcers and pitchmen in radio and he was a pioneer in making commercials part of a program's story. Wilcox also had roles on television and film.

== Early life ==
Wilcox came from a show business-oriented family, with a father who played in the Ringling Brothers circus band and a sister who played violin both in vaudeville and in classical concerts. Harlow took vocal lessons and briefly performed on stage.

== Fibber McGee and Molly ==
He eventually decided to try radio and met Jim and Marian Jordan at a station in Chicago. An April 1944 article in Radio Mirror magazine reported:

Jim and Marion [sic] Jordan were just getting a toehold in radio in Chicago then and Wilcox helped them cut some records. When the pair landed their own radio show, they asked for Wilcox as their announcer. The future triumphs of the trio are well known to all Fibber McGee and Molly fans. When the Jordans moved out to Hollywood in 1939, Wilcox went with them and now, even when Fibber McGee and Molly leave the air for their annual summer vacations on their ranch, Wilcox carries on, announcing the sponsor's substitute show.

Wilcox became "one of the most successful announcers and pitchmen in radio." He was the announcer for Fibber McGee and Molly (his first network program) throughout the show's run in a 30-minute format. He also was a pioneer in making commercials a part of a program's story rather than something simply inserted during a break. The "Wistful Vista" website put it this way:

Wilcox was one of the masters of the integrated commercial, a technique that was popularized on Ed Wynn's and Jack Benny's shows. Instead of stopping the story for the mid-show commercial, Wilcox would just show up and work his plug into the plot, much to Fibber's consternation. Fibber tagged Wilcox with the nickname "Waxy" for his ability to turn any conversation topic to Johnson's Wax ...

An article in a Smithsonian Institution newsletter described Wilcox's role in integrating commercials into stories as follows:

A standard joke on the popular comedy Fibber McGee and Molly was the arrival of Johnson's Wax salesman Harlow Wilcox. He knocked at their door as just another person in their stream of visitors, but no matter what the conversation had been about before his arrival, Wilcox somehow managed to turn it to floor wax within a few moments, and then struggled to promote his product over the continuing action around him.

As was generally true of radio personalities, most people's impressions of Harlow Wilcox came solely from hearing him on the air. One writer, however, recorded her perceptions as a member of the studio audience at the Fibber McGee and Molly broadcast Dec. 5, 1946. In her "By-ways" column, Florence Burlingame Taylor wrote:

Harlowe [sic] Wilcox was introduced as a young lad, just getting a start in radio. This was before Harlowe appeared, and Fibber had us believing that Harlowe was ill. How we applauded the popular Harlowe! He is a handsome, debonair man-about-town – at least 40, gray-haired, with crisp gray mustache, tall, with all the poise of a veteran announcer.

== Radio shows ==
Radio shows for which Wilcox was announcer included Amos 'n' Andy, The Baby Snooks Show, Ben Bernie, Fibber McGee and Molly, Frank Merriwell, Hap Hazard, Hollywood Premiere, Suspense, Truth or Consequences, The Victor Borge Show Your Electric Servant, Blondie Boston Blackie and The Passing Parade.

== Television and film ==
In addition to his announcing roles, Wilcox also acted in an episode of the TV version of You Are There and in two movies, Look Who's Laughing and They're Off.

Wilcox can be heard on a 1937 promotional film for Stewart-Warner refrigerators which was preserved by the Library of Congress, and which also includes an appearance by 18-year-old Art Carney.

In the 1950s, Wilcox was executive vice president of Rockett Pictures, Inc., a film production company in Hollywood, California.
