= Straight man =

Stock character, notable for remaining composed in a comedic performance

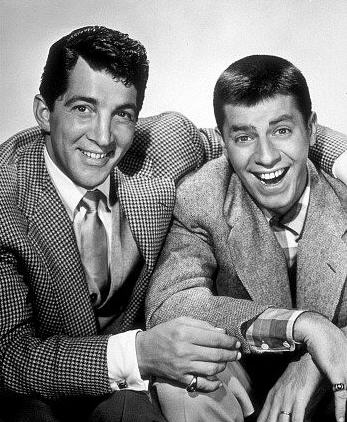
Martin and Lewis featured Dean Martin (left) as the smooth, debonair straight man and Jerry Lewis as the wild, oafish comic.

The straight man, also known as a "comedic foil", is a stock character in a comedy performance, especially a double act, sketch comedy, or farce. When a comedy partner behaves eccentrically, the straight man is expected to maintain composure. The straight man is a foil, a contrasting character to the funny man. The direct contribution to the comedy a straight man provides typically comes in the form of a deadpan.

A straight man with no direct comedic role has historically been known as a stooge. Typically, he is expected to feed the funny man lines that he can respond to for laughs (and is hence sometimes known as a feed), while seeking no acclamation for himself.

== History ==
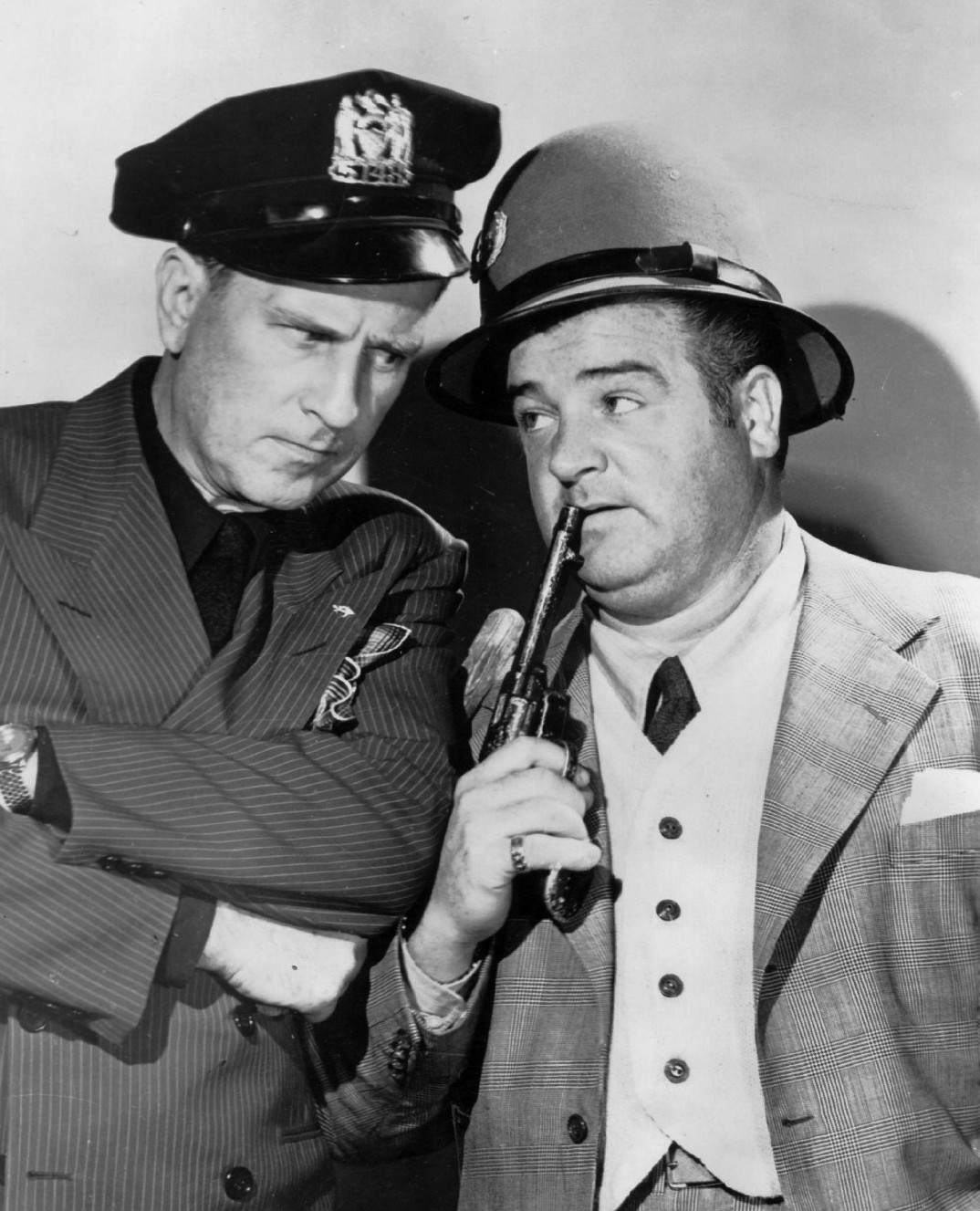
Abbott (left) acting as straight man to Costello

In vaudeville, effective straight men were much less common than comedians. The straight man's name usually appeared first and he usually received 60% of the take. This helped take the sting out of not being the laugh-getter and helped ensure the straight man's loyalty to the team. Abbott and Costello, one of America's most popular comedy duos of the 1940s and 50s in radio, film and television, began as nightclub performers when the straight-faced Bud Abbott contrasted against the bumbling Lou Costello; Abbott, unusually, allowed Costello a larger paycheck to keep him on the team.

Jerry Seinfeld is a famous example of a straight man act in his Seinfeld sitcom.

=== Women ===
Many actresses have played under the role. Examples of noteworthy straight women include Margaret Dumont, who often performed with the Marx Brothers in their films, Bernardine Flynn up against Art van Harvey on Vic and Sade, Marian Jordan against her husband Jim on Smackout and Fibber McGee and Molly, and Pam Dawber, who performed with Robin Williams on the television series Mork & Mindy. Selena Gomez plays the comedic foil to Steve Martin and Martin Short on the Hulu series Only Murders in the Building.

== See also ==
- Everyman
- Foil
- Manzai
