= Heavenly Days =

1944 film by Howard Estabrook

- Directed by: Howard Estabrook
- Written by: Howard Estabrook; Don Quinn
- Produced by: Robert Fellows
- Starring: Jim Jordan; Marian Jordan
- Cinematography: J. Roy Hunt
- Edited by: Robert Swink
- Music by: Leigh Harline
- Distributed by: RKO Radio Pictures
- Release date: October 20, 1944 (U.S.)
- Running time: 71 minutes
- Country: United States
- Language: English

Heavenly Days is a 1944 comedy film starring Fibber McGee and Molly. It was the third and final feature film to feature the popular radio characters; unlike the two previous entries, none of the radio show's supporting cast members appeared in this film except the show's house vocal quartet, The King's Men.

== Cast ==
- Jim Jordan as Fibber McGee
- Marian Jordan as Molly McGee
- Eugene Pallette as Senator Bigby
- Gordon Oliver as Dick Martin
- Raymond Walburn as Mr. Popham
- Barbara Hale as Angie
- Don Douglas as Dr. George Gallup
- Frieda Inescort as Ettie Clark
- Irving Bacon as Tower, the Butler
- The King's Men as Soldier Quartet
- Emory Parnell as Detective

== Reception ==
It lost $205,000 at the box office.

== See also ==
- List of American films of 1944

== External list ==
- Heavenly Days at the AFI Catalog of Feature Films
- Heavenly Days at IMDb
- Film review at Variety
