= The Halls of Ivy (TV series) =

American TV situation comedy series (1954–1955)

- Genre: Comedy
- Created by: Don Quinn
- Based on: The Halls of Ivy
- Written by: Don Quinn
- Directed by: Norman Z. McLead; William Cameron Menzies
- Starring: Ronald Colman; Benita Hume; Mary Wickes; Herb Butterfield
- Theme music composer: Henry Russell; Vick Knight
- Opening theme: "Halls of Ivy"
- Country of origin: United States
- Original language: English
- No. of seasons: 1
- No. of episodes: 52

Production
- Producer: Bill Frye

Original release
- Network: CBS
- Release: October 19, 1954 – September 29, 1955

The Halls of Ivy is an American television situation comedy that was broadcast October 19, 1954 - September 29, 1955, on CBS.

== Background ==
The Halls of Ivy was adapted from the radio series of the same name, which starred Ronald Colman and his wife, Benita Hume. The series's creator, Don Quinn, never attended college, so he relied on his wife as "his authority on college life". The radio show "reaped awards from schools, critics, and public." Its recognition included a 1950 Peabody Award "because it has succeeded in mixing wit and charm with liberal and enlightened social philosophy" and the writers and actors "demonstrated that radio comedy can be successful even at the risk of being intelligent". Its ending on June 25, 1952, because the sponsor decided that competition from TV made the show unprofitable, prompted objections from listeners.

After the radio series ended, prospects for a TV version seemed dim. The cost of making a TV show was a significant factor, and "the Colmans did not express eagerness to take on a television chore six times as arduous as the radio show every week." In the spring of 1954, Television Programs of America (TPA) announced plans to produce 39 episodes of the TV show, starring Colman and Hume, at a cost of $2 million. That average cost of approximately $50,000 per episode was "far more than the talent and production cost" of contemporary programs. Dragnet cost approximately $21,000 per episode, Armstrong Circle Theatre $16,000, and Fireside Theatre $20,000.

== Overview ==
Dr. William Todhunter Hall was the "literate, witty" president of fictional Ivy College in the midwestern United States. Episodes typically involved elements of the college (board of governors, faculty and students) and Hall's home life. Other regular characters were the president's "patient, understanding, long-suffering, witty" wife, Vicky, their housekeeper, Alice, and Clarence Wellman, who chaired the college's Board of Governors.

== Cast ==
- Ronald Colman as Dr. William Todhunter Hall
- Benita Hume as Vicky Hall
- Mary Wickes as Alice
- Herb Butterfield as Clarence Wellman
- Ray Collins and James Todd as Dr. Merriweather
- John Lupton, Jerry Paris, Richard Tyler, Bob Sands as students

== Schedule problems ==
The Halls of Ivy was initially broadcast on Tuesdays from 8:30 to 9 p.m. Eastern Time. That timing put it opposite the second half of The Milton Berle Show, which was carried by all NBC affiliates. The Halls of Ivy sometimes had difficulty gaining clearance to be carried on stations because of a policy that prohibited back-to-back scheduling of programs sponsored by competing products. In an era when some stations broadcast programs from more than one network, a station that carried Life Is Worth Living (sponsored by Admiral appliances) from 8 to 8:30 p.m. on Tuesdays would not carry The Halls of Ivy (sponsored on alternate weeks by International Harvester appliances). For example, a report in The Des Moines Register in November 1954 said that only three of 14 TV stations in that newspaper's coverage area carried The Halls of Ivy.

By February 1955 the trade publication Billboard reported that the program's "future is uncertain", adding, "If it remains around next season it will be shifted into another time period." Beginning on July 14, 1955, it was moved to Thursdays from 10:30 to 11 p.m. E. T. International Harvester continued its sponsorship, but Nabisco dropped out as alternate-week sponsor.

== Production ==
Bill Frye was the producer. Norman Z. McLeod and William Cameron Menzies were the directors. Quinn was one of the writers and was editorial supervisor. Some scripts from the radio series were adapted for the TV version. The theme song, "Halls of Ivy" by Henry Russell and Vick Knight, was performed by a male chorus. A recording of the theme had some success.

The Halls of Ivy was produced in black-and-white at the Motion Picture Center on film using a four-day shooting schedule, which the trade publication Billboard reported was "probably the only TV show of which that's true". The production schedule also accommodated Colman's desires by taking more than one year to film 39 episodes The premiere episode was filmed without a laugh track, but after that a track was added. After some reviewers said that early episodes were "too static", producers added more movement to the show.

In May 1955 The Halls of Ivy was sold for broadcast in Australia. In the fall of 1955 TPA put the program's 52 episodes into rerun syndication.

== Critical response ==
George E. Condon, writing in The Plain Dealer, praised the quality of the show: "From its beginning, as a radio show, the scripts have consistently followed along the same literate path, hewing close to high moral standards. At the same time, the scripts have managed to provide some very laughable lines — based, incidentally, on something other than sheer slapstick."

Associated Press writer Bob Thomas commented that the show "goes against the trend in TV comedy" with a lack of "hurled pies, splashing seltzer bottels or baggy pants". He added that the actors created humorous situations while they still "behave like educated human beings".

A review in Billboard found that a shift in emphasis to have less talk and more physical action resulted in improvement. The review called Colman "a tower of strength with his gentle portrait of an understanding educator" and said that Hume "renders him fine support in the same gentle vein".

TV Radio Mirror magazine said, "The Halls Of Ivy might best be described as 'sparkling entertainment — with a moral.' It is one of the first television series, in a comic vein, to comment on the structure and foibles of our society."

A review in TV Guide addressed the program's "overabundance of talk-talk-talk, however delightful, and an almost complete lack of action". The review complimented the performances of Colman, Hume, Wickes, and Butterfield, but it added that often a scene depended on what was said, a technique that was natural for radio, but "On television, things have to happen as well as be discussed."

The trade publication Broadcasting said that the premiere episode had "much dawdling", but the second episode was "a half-hour of whimsy and folksy humor". It said, "The whole program came to life", essentially re-creating the entertainment that the radio version had provided.
