= Ronald Colman =

British and American actor (1891–1958)

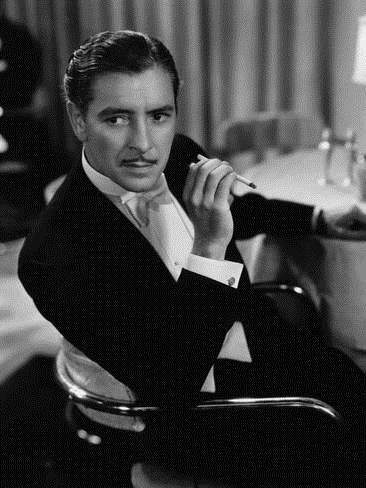
- Colman in 1935
- Born: Ronald Charles Colman; 9 February 1891; Richmond, Surrey, England
- Died: 19 May 1958 (aged 67); Santa Barbara, California, U.S.
- Resting place: Santa Barbara Cemetery
- Occupation: Actor
- Years active: 1914–1957
- Known for: A Double Life; A Tale of Two Cities; Lost Horizon; The Prisoner of Zenda
- Spouses: Thelma Raye (m. 1920; div. 1934) Benita Hume (m. 1938)
- Children: 1
- Relatives: Grace Colman (cousin)
- Awards: Academy Award for Best Actor; Hollywood Walk of Fame

Ronald Charles Colman (9 February 1891 – 19 May 1958) was an English actor who started his career in theatre and silent film in his native country, then emigrated to the United States, where he had a highly successful Hollywood film career. Colman starred in silent films and successfully transitioned to sound, aided by his distinctive, pleasing voice. He was most popular during the 1930s and 1940s. Colman received Oscar nominations for Bulldog Drummond (1929), Condemned (1929), and Random Harvest (1942). He starred in several classic films, including A Tale of Two Cities (1935), Lost Horizon (1937), and The Prisoner of Zenda (1937). Colman also played the starring role in the Technicolor classic Kismet (1944), with Marlene Dietrich. In 1947, he won an Academy Award for Best Actor and Golden Globe Award for Best Actor for his performance in the film A Double Life.

Colman received a star on the Hollywood Walk of Fame for his work in motion pictures and later was awarded a second star for his television work.

== Early years ==
Ronald Charles Colman was born on 9 February 1891 at Woodville, 156 Sandycombe Road (renamed and renumbered 7 Broomfield Road), in Richmond, Surrey, England, the third son (his eldest brother died in infancy in 1882) and fifth child of Charles Colman,^{note1} a silk merchant and mantle manufacturer, and his wife Marjory Read Fraser.^{note2} His surviving siblings were Gladys, Edith, Eric, and Freda. He was a cousin of the Labour politician Grace Colman. In the subsequent years, the family moved to Ealing, first to 27 Inglis Road and then to 44 Inglis Road, a corner house at the end of the street. In 1911 and 1914, the family is recorded in a house called Cranford at 27 Denbigh Road.

Colman attended Hadleigh House School in Littlehampton where he discovered that he enjoyed acting despite his shyness. Later, Colman was educated at Rolandseck School in Ealing under German-born headmaster Ernst Felix Marx. ^{note3} He intended to study engineering at Cambridge, but his father's sudden death from pneumonia in 1907 made it financially impossible.

== First World War ==
While working as a clerk with Watts, Watts & Co., Ltd. (managers of the Britain Steamship Company) in the City of London, Colman joined the London Scottish Regiment in 1909 for four years. At the outbreak of the First World War, he quit his job the next day and rejoined his regiment. Colman was Private No. 2148 with the 'A' company of the 1/14th (County of London) Battalion of the London Regiment (London Scottish).

On 15 September 1914, the battalion embarked at Southampton in the SS Winifred and arrived the next day at Le Havre. Six weeks later, the London Scottish were driven to Ypres to reinforce the front. At Ypres on 30 October, Colman was said to have "had the decidedly unpleasant experience of being buried alive by the explosion of a shell", but was dug out unharmed. Later that day, the battalion was moved to Wytschaete, where it engaged in the Battle of Messines on the next day. Colman was seriously wounded in the right ankle, which gave him a limp that he sought to hide throughout his acting career: "Disability. Fracture of Ankle (Rt.) In action near Ypres 31-10-14. Man states that when advancing a shell burst near him, and he was thrown heavily injuring his right foot either by the fall or his foot being struck. There is considerable thickening of Rt. ankle. There is also some tenderness and after walking any distance there is pain and lameness." Colman was treated at the field ambulance and was transferred to England the next day. He was admitted to St. Bartholomew's Hospital in London, where he stayed from 6 to 11 November. Having sufficiently recovered, Colman was transferred to the 3/14 Battalion of the London Scottish and was sent to Perth, where he did light clerical duty and lived at Strathview (No. 75–77), Muirton Place. On 6 May 1915, Colman was declared "No longer fit physically for war service" and discharged.

Colman's military character was given as "Very good. Honest, sober and trustworthy." He was awarded a pension, as well as the Victory Medal, the British War Medal, the 1914 Star with clasps and roses, and the Silver War Badge. In 1928, Colman was made an honorary life member of the London Scottish.

Fellow Hollywood actors Claude Rains, Herbert Marshall, Cedric Hardwicke, and Basil Rathbone all saw service with the London Scottish in the war.

== Career ==
=== Concert parties and amateur stage ===
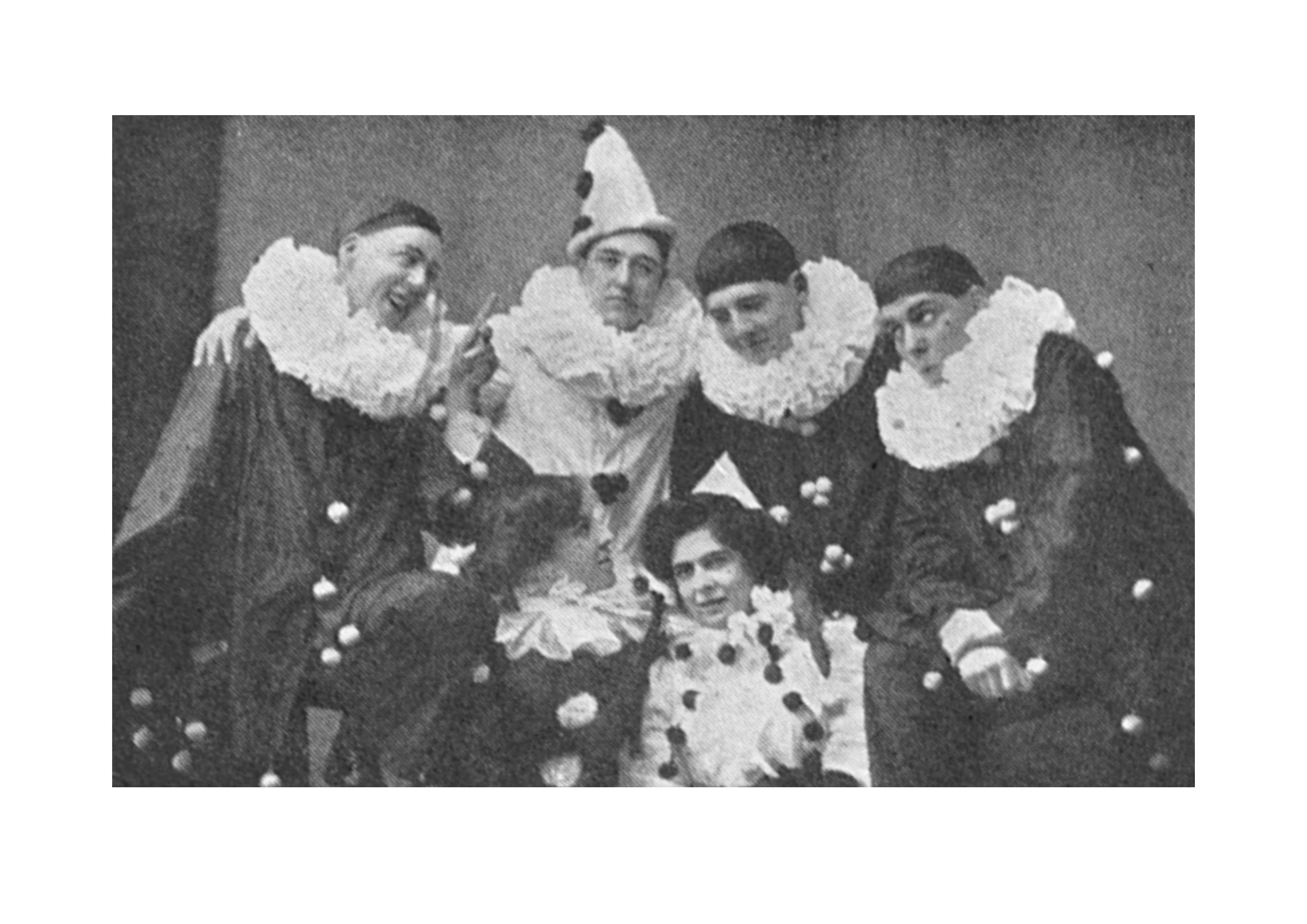
The Popinjays with Ronald Colman (far right), c. 1913

About the same time Colman joined the London Scottish, he took to the stage and soon established himself as a member of the performing community in Ealing. Between 1909 and 1914, Colman appeared solo and with various concert parties and amateur dramatics groups. He began with banjo solos at benefit concerts and two years later, joined the short-lived Pierrot troupes The Tangerines and The Summer 'Uns, who only had one performance. In 1912, while on the Isle of Wight, Colman and some friends formed the Mad Medicos, who performed under his direction. A part of this troupe then became the Popinjays, again under Colman's direction, until George Denby (1892-1951) took over. Besides banjo solos and duets, Colman's repertoire included songs and duets such as "Two Little Sausages" (Lionel Monckton) and musical monologues, recitals of poems such as The Green Eye of the Little Yellow God, funny stories, and above all, character sketches from Dickens such as Uriah Heep, John Brodie, and Martin Chuzzlewit. At "An Evening with Dickens", Colman played Charles Darnay in three scenes from A Tale of Two Cities. He also staged three pieces of his own: the duologues "My Pierrot" and "A Knotty Problem" and the miniature revue "Come Inside". When Colman rejoined the Popinjays in July 1916 for performances at the Pavilion in Derby, between theatre engagements, a marked change in his repertoire occurred; the character sketch was now of a Chelsea Pensioner, and he recited Spotty, a Tale of the Trenches.

Besides these performances, Colman also appeared on the amateur stage. He made his debut as Freddy Fitzfoodle in Rich Miss Rustle at Victoria Hall, Ealing, on 11 November 1909. In April 1910, he sang in the chorus of palace officials and guards in the comic opera The Rose of Persia, performed by the Baltic Amateur Dramatic and Operatic Society at the Royal Court Theatre. Shortly afterwards he appeared in the one-act plays Barbara and Lights Out and Spoiling the Broth. In October and November of the same year, Colman sang and danced as Bill Bobstay in H.M.S. Pinafore with the West Middlesex Operatic Society. In 1911, he appeared in the farcical comedy Jane and in the next year as Samson Quayle in A Tight Corner and in The Adventure of Lady Ursula, again with the Baltic Amateur Dramatic and Operatic Society.Around this time, Colman joined the Bancroft Dramatic Club, which had been founded in 1892 by Sir Squire Bancroft and performed mainly at the King's Hall Theatre on the premises of the National Sporting Club in Covent Garden. Among its vice presidents were actors such as George Alexander, Johnston Forbes-Robertson, and Ellen Terry. With the Bancroft D. C., Colman appeared in six plays between 1911 and 1914: The Admirable Crichton, Priscilla Runs Away, The Dancing Girl, The Passing of the Third Floor Back, Fanny's First Play, and Sowing the Wind. He also performed in Mr. Steinman's Corner and as Douglas Cattermole in The Private Secretary with Vivian Parrott's Amateur Dramatic Society.

=== Theatre ===
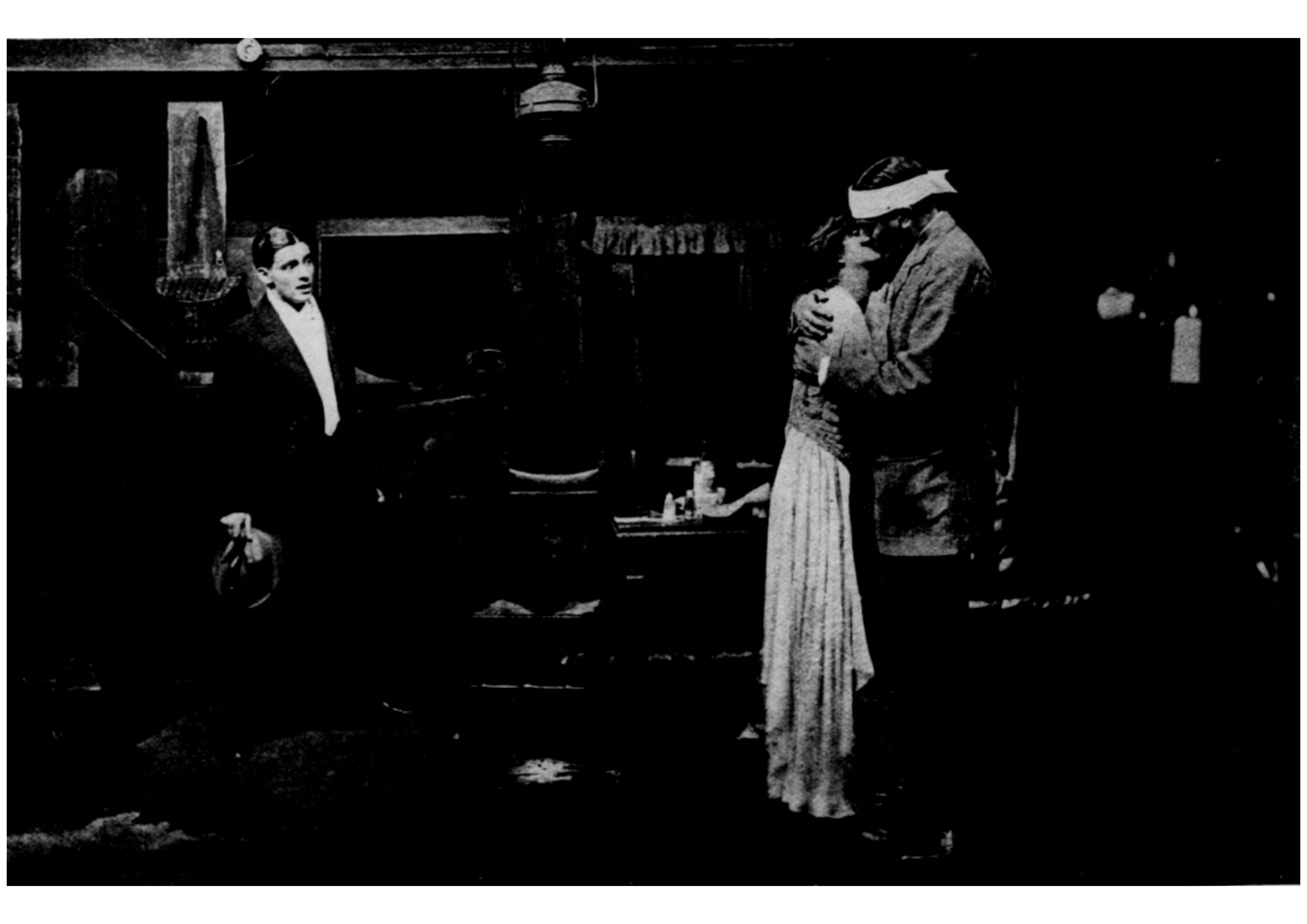
The earliest known photo of Ronald Colman (left) on stage, together with Gladys Cooper and Malcolm Cherry in The Misleading Lady, September 1916.

Colman had sufficiently recovered from his wartime injury to appear at the London Coliseum on 19 June 1916 as Rahmat Sheikh in The Maharani of Arakan, with Lena Ashwell, at the Playhouse in September that year as Stephen Weatherbee in the Charles Goddard/Paul Dickey play The Misleading Lady, and at the Court Theatre in March 1917 as Webber in Partnership. At the same theatre, the following year he appeared in Eugène Brieux's Damaged Goods. At the Ambassadors Theatre in February 1918, Colman played George Lubin in The Little Brother. In 1918, he toured the UK as David Goldsmith in The Bubble and as Wilfred Carpenter in The Live Wire.

By 1914, the Colmans had moved to a furnished flat at 46 Lancaster Gate, Kensington. Colman now took rooms at 22 Adam Street, Portman Square, which he kept until after his marriage to Thelma Raye on the 18th of September 1920. They also had a flat in Victoria Street.

Five days after his marriage, Ronald Colman boarded the SS Zeeland in Southampton and sailed to New York City, giving Los Angeles as his final destination. He arrived on the 2 October and found work quickly, for less than three weeks later, he was on the stage again. He had two walk-on parts in The Dauntless Three, starring Robert Warwick, which opened in Atlantic City on 21 October and closed, after a trial run and two weeks on tour, in November at Poli’s in Washington, DC. Not long afterwards, rehearsals began for The Green Goddess with George Arliss, which opened on 27 December in Philadelphia. Despite good reviews, Colman was replaced after the first week in New York. He had now earned enough money to bring his wife to join him. Thelma arrived on 23 February 1921 while Colman was out of work. He then got a part in The Silver Fox, which opened on 2 May in Washington, but he was replaced after the trial run to film Handcuffs or Kisses. On the 4th of July, he played in The Elton Case at the Broadway Theatre in Long Branch, New Jersey.After another spell of unemployment, he appeared in The Nightcap on Broadway from 15 August until October and, from the 11th of September onwards, also in East is West, which toured until the end of April 1922. Again, Colman was unemployed, this time for nearly four months. He eventually found work in East of Suez, which opened on 28 August in Atlantic City, only to be fired after the trial run. However, Ruth Chatterton now hired him almost immediately to play in La Tendresse, which opened on 25 September on Broadway. It was to be Colman’s final stage work.

=== Film ===
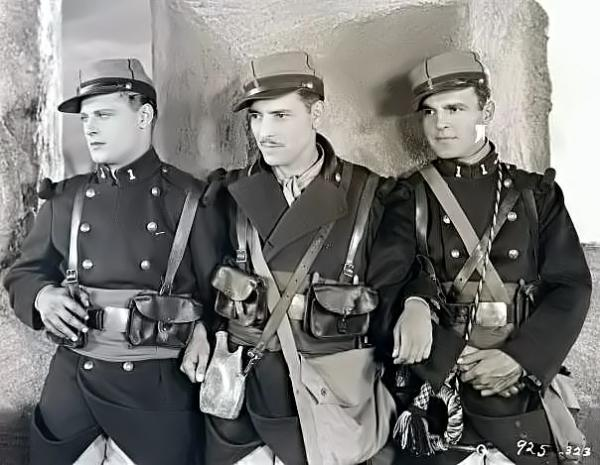
Colman in Beau Geste

Colman had first appeared in films in Britain in 1917 and 1919 for director Cecil Hepworth. He subsequently acted for the old Broadwest Film Company in Snow in the Desert. While Colman was on stage in New York City in La Tendresse, director Henry King saw him and engaged him as the leading man in the 1923 film The White Sister, opposite Lillian Gish. Colman was an immediate success. Thereafter, Colman virtually abandoned the stage for film.

Colman became a very popular silent film star in both romantic and adventure films, among them The Dark Angel (1925), Stella Dallas (1926), Beau Geste (1926), and The Winning of Barbara Worth (1926). His dark hair and eyes and his athletic and riding ability (he did most of his own stunts until late in his career) led reviewers to describe him as a "Valentino type". Colman was often cast in similar, exotic roles. Towards the end of the silent era, he was teamed with Hungarian actress Vilma Bánky under Samuel Goldwyn; the two were a popular film team, rivalling Greta Garbo and John Gilbert.

Although Colman was a huge success in silent films, he was unable to capitalise on one of his chief assets until the advent of the talking picture – "his beautifully modulated and cultured voice" also described as "a bewitching, finely modulated, resonant voice". Colman was often viewed as a suave English gentleman, whose voice embodied chivalry and mirrored the image of a "stereotypical English gentleman". Commenting on Colman's appeal, English film critic David Shipman stated that Colman was "the dream lover – calm, dignified, trustworthy. Although he was a lithe figure in adventure stories, his glamour – which was genuine – came from his respectability; he was an aristocratic figure, without being aloof."

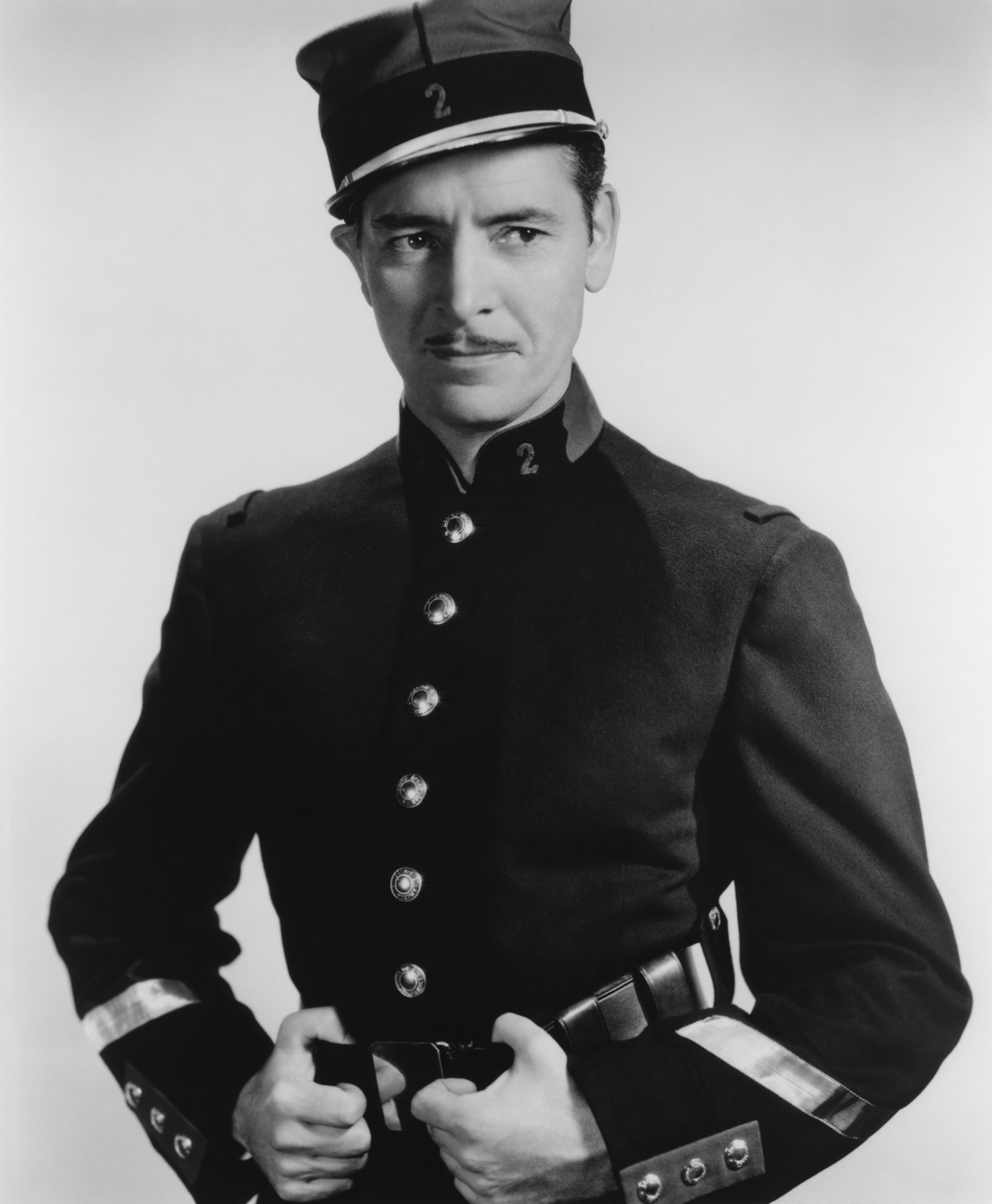
As Sergeant Victor in Under Two Flags.

Colman's first major talkie success was in 1930, when he was nominated for the Academy Award for Best Actor for his performances in Condemned and Bulldog Drummond. Colman thereafter appeared in a number of notable films: Raffles in 1930, Clive of India and A Tale of Two Cities in 1935, Under Two Flags in 1936, The Prisoner of Zenda and Lost Horizon in 1937, If I Were King in 1938, and Random Harvest and The Talk of the Town in 1942. He won the Best Actor Oscar in 1948 for A Double Life. He next starred in a screwball comedy, 1950's Champagne for Caesar.

At the time of his death, Colman was contracted by Metro-Goldwyn-Mayer for the lead role in Village of the Damned. However, after Colman's death, the film transferred production from MGM Studios in Culver City, California to MGM-British Studios in Borehamwood, England. George Sanders, who married Colman's widow, Benita Hume, was cast in the role intended for Colman.

=== Fame ===
Colman has been mentioned in many novels, but he is specifically mentioned in Ralph Ellison's Invisible Man because of his charming, well-known voice. The main character of this novel says that he wishes he could have a voice like Colman's because it is charming and relates the voice to that of a gentleman or a man from Esquire magazine. Colman was indeed very well known for his voice. Encyclopædia Britannica says that Colman had a "resonant, mellifluous speaking voice with a unique, pleasing timbre". Along with his charming voice, Colman had a very confident performing manner that helped make him a major star of sound films.

Colman invested his money in property. His first own house in Los Angeles was a Spanish-style home in 2092 Mound Street, to which he added a tennis court on top of a three-car garage which was cut out of the hillside in 1927. Colman lived here with his friend Charles Lane, who had moved into a separate bungalow after the completion of The Winning of Barbara Worth. As retreats Colman leased a cottage at Malibu Beach and bought a large tract of land in Hidden Valley with a ranch at 1151 Hidden Valley Road in 1932, which he kept for about 20 years. Three years later, Colman bought the large Tudor-style home of Corinne Griffith at 1003 Summit Drive in Los Angeles. That same year, Colman bought San Ysidro Ranch with his friend Al Weingand and turned it into a resort. He kept a house there and moved in permanently in 1953 with his family.

=== Radio and television ===
As early as 1942, Colman joined forces with several other Hollywood luminaries to inaugurate international broadcasts by the CBS radio network over La Cadena de las Américas (The Network of the Americas) under the supervision of the Office of the Coordinator of Inter-American Affairs chaired by Nelson Rockefeller. In the process, he contributed substantially to the implementation of President Franklin Roosevelt's cultural diplomacy initiatives throughout South America during World War II.

Colman's vocal talents contributed to National Broadcasting Company programming on D-Day, 6 June 1944, when he read "Poem and Prayer for an Invading Army", written by Edna St. Vincent Millay for exclusive radio use by NBC.

Beginning in 1945, Colman made many guest appearances on The Jack Benny Program on radio, alongside his second wife, stage and screen actress Benita Hume, whom he married in 1938. Colman was to appear with his wife on the Benny radio program for a total of 21 appearances up to 1951. Their comedy work as Benny's perpetually exasperated next-door neighbors led to their own radio comedy, The Halls of Ivy from 1950 to 1952, created by Fibber McGee & Molly mastermind Don Quinn, on which the Colmans played the literate, charming president of a middle American college and his former-actress wife. Listeners were surprised to discover that the episode of 24 January 1951, "The Goya Bequest" – a story examining the bequest of a Goya painting that was suspected of being a fraud hyped by its late owner to avoid paying customs duties when bringing it to the United States – was written by Colman himself, who poked fun at his accomplishment while taking a rare turn giving the evening's credits at the show's conclusion. The Halls of Ivy ran on NBC radio from 1950 to 1952; an adaptation of the same name was on CBS television for the 1954–55 season.

Colman was also the host and occasional star of the syndicated anthology Favorite Story (1946–1949). Of note was his narration and portrayal of Scrooge in a 1948 adaptation of A Christmas Carol.

== Death ==
In March 1957, Colman underwent surgery for a lung infection, and began suffering from ill health afterwards. He was hospitalized and died on 19 May 1958, aged 67, from acute emphysema in Santa Barbara, California. He was interred in the Santa Barbara Cemetery. Colman and his second wife, Benita Hume, had a daughter, Juliet Benita, born in 1944.

== Awards, honours and legacy ==
Colman was nominated thrice for the Academy Award for Best Actor. At the 3rd Academy Awards ceremony he received a single nomination for his work in two films; Bulldog Drummond (1929) and Condemned (1929). Colman was nominated again for Random Harvest (1942), before winning for A Double Life (1947), in which he played the role of Anthony John, an actor playing Othello who comes to identify with the character. He also won the Golden Globe Award for Best Actor in 1947 for A Double Life. In 2002, Colman's Oscar statuette was sold at auction by Christie's for US$174,500.

Colman was a recipient of the George Eastman Award, given by George Eastman House for distinguished contribution to the art of film.

Colman has two stars on the Hollywood Walk of Fame in Los Angeles, one for motion pictures at 6801 Hollywood Boulevard and one for television at 1623 Vine Street.

Colman is the subject of a biography written by his daughter Juliet Benita Colman in 1975: Ronald Colman: A Very Private Person.

The Dublin slang term "ronnie", referring to a moustache, derives from Colman's thin moustache.

== Filmography ==
Radio programmes
Year	Program	Episode/source
1945	Suspense	"August Heat"
1945	Suspense	"The Dunwich Horror"
1946	Academy Award	Lost Horizon
1946	Encore Theatre	Yellowjack
1952	Lux Radio Theatre	Les Misérables
1953	Suspense	Vision of Death

== Writing ==
When asked what his choice would be if he had to take up another profession, Colman answered: "Writing." As a young entertainer, he had written three short pieces for the stage (see above) and also several articles that were published in magazines. In 1922, when he was looking for work in New York, he wrote a script called "The Amazing Experiment". After his arrival in Hollywood, Samuel Goldwyn asked him to contribute a number of autobiographical pieces for the publicity department. Later, in 1951, he wrote two episodes for the radio show The Halls of Ivy, "The Goya Bequest" and "Halloween". In the next year, he adapted "The Lost Silk Hat" with Milton Merlin from a story by Lord Dunsany for the television show Four Star Playhouse. However, despite tempting offers, Colman never wrote his memoirs.

- "The Story of My Life", Motion Picture Magazine, Vol. 29, No. 2, March 1925, pp. 32, 94–95.
- "How We Live in Hollywood", The Graphic, 11 June 1927, pp. 438, 462.
- "All Men Want To Be Gallants", The Night of Love (United Artists Pressbook), 1927.
- "A Londoner in Hollywood - Girls I Make Love To", The Evening News, 19 March 1928, p. 13.
- "A Londoner in Hollywood II. - How Success Comes In Screenland." The Evening News, 23 March 1928, p. 13.
- "My Reminiscences", The Sunday Express, 15 April 1928, p. 11.
- "Ronald Colman Bares The Souls Of The Film Queens". The Sunday Express, 22 April 1928, p. 11.
- "Film-Crazy Girls are Warned." The People, April 29, 1928, p. 6.
- "The Truth About Valentino". The Sunday Express, 29 April 1928, p. 11.
- "Facing Death To Make A Film Thrill". The Sunday Express, 6 May 1928, p. 11
- "Hollywood By Night". The Sunday Express, 13 May 1928, p. 10.
- "Queer Women". The Sunday Express, 20 May 1928, p. 11.
- "War Wound That Led to Hollywood", Sunday Mercury, Birmingham, 9 December 1928, p. 4.
- Foreword. The Romance of the Talkies, by Garry Allighan. London: C. Stacey, 1929, p. ix.
- "The Talkies are doing One Great thing", Film Weekly, 18 November 1929, p. 19.
- "Ronald Colman, Clerk!", The Meriden Daily Journal, 27 August 1931, p. 6.
- "The Way I See It", Photoplay, September 1931, pp. 65, 94–95.
- "Ronald Colman Reveals Secrets of Successful Screen Acting", Daily Mirror, 26 November 1931, p. 8.
- "Stage and Film Acting", Blyth News, 14 December 1931, p. 5.
- "My World-Wide Travels. Impressions of Shanghai and Vienna". Daily Mirror, 24 March 1932, p. 17.
- "My Own Story", Film Pictorial Annual, 9 and 16 April 1932.
- "I Was Broke", The World Film Encyclopedia, ed. Clarence Winchester, London: The Amalgamated Press Ltd., 1933, pp. 218–219.
- "Ronald Colman says Perseverance and Good Luck are needed in climbing the ladder of fame", Irish Independent, 25 November 1933, p. 19.
- "The new Loretta Young", Film Weekly, 22 March 1935.
- "Blown to Film Fame", Escabana Daily Press, 13 September 1935, p. 2.
- "The Climax of my Career", Picturegoer, 8 February 1936, 16.
- "Living Up to Myths", The Atlanta Constitution (Screen and Radio Weekly section), vol. 68, issue 277, 15 March 1936, p. 3.
- "My Life – Such as it Is!", Table Talk, July 29, 1937, pp. 19–20.
- "What the Oscar means to me", Motion Picture, July 1948, p. 40.
- "My Favorite Story", Toledo Blade, 19 September 1950.
- Foreword. "Dear hearts and gentle people".Who's Who in TV & Radio, vol. 2, no. 1, 1952, p. 77.
- "Personal Magnetism", The Hollywood Reporter, 14 November 1955.

== See also ==
- List of oldest and youngest Academy Award winners and nominees — Oldest winners for Best Lead Actor
- List of actors with more than one Academy Award nomination in the acting categories

== Notes ==
1Charles Colman was the eldest son of Frederick Charles Colman and Susannah Bonner. In 1880 he joined his father's firm Selincourt, Colman and Son which had been founded in 1857. The firm traded in silk and also produced coats, fur garments and dresses in a factory near Vauxhall Bridge in Pimlico. They employed nearly six hundred women and girls and supplied large stores like Harvey Nichols. Colman sen. left the firm in 1885, and in 1891 the partnership between Charles Colman and Charles Alexandre de Sélincourt was dissolved by mutual consent. Together with William Edward Faraker und Frederick Brice Martin, Colman now set up his own firm, Messrs. Charles Colman and Co., Ltd., silk merchants and mantle manufacturers, and in 1896 again the partnership was dissolved. The next year he merged with the firm of Williams, Cazaly and Co. to form the new company Charles Colman and Cazaly, Ltd. After a bankruptcy in 1899, which was averted, the firm was liquidated in 1904. Privately Charles Colman was Secretary of the Kew Gardens Public Rights Defence Association and in 1890 he was Secretary of the committee which organised the London Philatelic Exhibition 1890. In 1906 he sold his valuable stamp collection, which included a Twelve Penny Black, for nearly £2000 (today about £160,000). He was also a keen horticulturalist and cyclist.

2 Ronald Colman believed himself to be a direct descendant of the two George Colmans, father and son, after his aunt Constance (d. 1953) had researched the family history. However, this does not seem likely, as there is no family connection between Ronald Colman’s great-grandfather Joseph and the two sons of George Colman the Younger, who were of the same generation.

3Colman probably attended a third school. In 1905, a "R. C. Colman" took the local examinations as a pupil of The Cedars School, Ealing. The Cedars was situated at 117 Uxbridge Road, about half a mile from Rolandseck School on Haven Green and the Colmans' home in Inglis Road. Colman was also said to have been at St. Paul's School and to have taken singing lessons for one year at Guildhall School of Music, but his name is not in the student registers of either school.
