= This Way Please =

1937 film by Robert Florey

- Directed by: Robert Florey
- Distributed by: Paramount Pictures
- Release date: October 7, 1937
- Running time: 73 minutes
- Country: United States
- Language: English

This Way Please is a 1937 American musical comedy film directed by Robert Florey and featuring Charles "Buddy" Rogers, a popular singer from the days of vaudeville entertainment.

According to historian Martin Grams, the film was the introduction of Mary Livingstone (Mrs. Jack Benny) and Jim and Marian Jordan (radio's Fibber McGee and Molly). It was also Betty Grable's first motion picture under contract with Paramount Studios.

== Plot ==
Jane Morrow applies for the job of a theater usherette, and encounters her matinée idol. After he takes a liking to her, he arranges for her to audition in front of an audience. Jane is a hit, making her idol less favorable. Jane soon finds herself engaged to another man, so a battle of romantic wits ensues.

== Cast ==
- Charles "Buddy" Rogers as Brad Morgan
- Betty Grable as Jane Morrow
- Ned Sparks as Inky Wells
- Jim Jordan as Fibber McGee
- Marian Jordan as Molly McGee
- Porter Hall as S.J. Crawford
- Lee Bowman as Stu Randall
- Cecil Cunningham as Miss Eberhardt
- Mary Livingstone as Maxine Barry
- Wally Vernon as Bumps
