= The Owl Box =

Ustream channel

The Owl Box (also known as Molly's Owls and variations) is a channel on Ustream that featured a live-streamed webcam trained on Molly, a wild barn owl and her activities, including the laying and hatching of her eggs. The show has since become an Internet phenomenon. The page has generated 20 million page views and at times as many as 20,000 people have been online.

== Background ==
The webcast takes place in the suburban San Marcos, California backyard of Carlos Royal, a retired realtor, and his wife Donna. The Royals had set a nesting box for owls on a 15-foot pole in 2008; however, it wasn't until February 2010 when a neighbor notified Royal about two owls inhabiting the box. Royal named the two owls "Molly" and "McGee", after radio show personalities Fibber McGee and Molly.

The box model installed at the Royal's is the Hoo'sHoo model, equipped with camera, designed and installed by Tom Stephan of barnowlboxes.com.

== Owlets ==
=== First clutch ===
Molly initially laid six eggs. The baby owls, dubbed "owlets", first hatched on March 21, 2010, and were watched by over 7 million viewers.

- "Max" - named for a friend of Carlos of over 40 years. Later dubbed "Maxine" after it was found out to be female.
- "Pattison" – named for Pattison Elementary, the first school with which Carlos did a live question and answer session via Ustream with students.
- "Austin" – named for Carlos and Donna's grandson who helped set up the broadcast and later made two full-length documentaries
- "Wesley" - named for Carlos and Donna's son and older brother Frank Wesley Royal.

Two eggs never hatched. One of them was eaten by Molly, while the reason for the fifth egg, named "Dudley", never hatching is unknown. All four owls first took flight on May 19, 2010.

=== Second clutch ===
Shortly after the first owls left the nest, Molly returned to the box and laid four more eggs. The Royals had planned on taking their summer vacation after the owlets left, and turned off the video stream. But travel complications arose and they never got around to it. The first owlet of the second set of eggs hatched Saturday, August 7, 2010, around 3:30 a.m.

- "Ashley" - hatched August 7, named for Carlos and Donna's granddaughter.
- "Carrie" – hatched August 8, named for singer Carrie Underwood.
- "Kelly" – hatched August 11, died August 17
- "Jody" - hatched August 14, died August 21.

Immediately after it was obvious that Jody had died, live video streaming temporarily stopped for the next three hours, as the dead owls become food for the rest. Reaction in the owl chat room and social stream, where people "talk" as they watch, was mixed. Some thanked Carlos for his sensitivity in sparing viewers the sight. Others criticized him for not allowing viewers to observe nature take its course. The death of the two owls were most likely not due to severe heat in the box since temperatures had been in the low 80s, but Carlos installed a mist making device over the box when temperatures were forecast to climb close to the 100 degree mark. Carlos Royal had stated his belief that the second group of owlets would fledge by October 20, 2010 and, because of some personal affairs, the webcam was taken off line on that date

=== Post-second clutch ===
After Ashley and Carrie had fledged and left, Carlos took a well-deserved vacation to see his granddaughter in Hawaii, the same Ashley that Ashley the owlet was named after. Before that, however, they noticed that Molly and McGee had returned. Carlos turned the outdoor camera on so that viewers could see Molly and McGee hanging around. This went on for about 2 weeks. At the end, Carlos posted on his blog that they were bonding and/or mating. However, there were no eggs. When Carlos had to turn off the cameras to go on his vacation, there were still no eggs. When they came back, there were still no eggs, although Molly was alternating shifts going into the box. Since Carlos's granddaughter was coming to San Marcos to get married in his backyard, and the wires were a trip hazard, Carlos unplugged the wires on all of the cameras, so that even he wouldn't see what was going on in the owl box. His last glimpse showed Molly in the box, with no eggs. On his blog, he announced that, if ever, The Owl Box would not go back on until 2011.

After a successful third clutch in 2011, a fourth clutch in March 2012 ended when McGee disappeared after the first chick hatched. McGee is believed to be deceased.

== Popularity ==
Since the debut of The Owl Box, the Royals have been featured on television, and have attracted a fan following. With the help of their grandson Austin, professional writers, illustrators, and manufacturers, the Royals sell videos, T-shirts, and other merchandise. Additionally, the Royals held a picnic in San Marcos for fans, which about 350* attended.

The story has been documented in the illustrated book for "kids of all ages" titled: "Molly The Owl, The True Story of a Common Barn Owl That Ends Up Being Not So Common After All". Written by New York Times bestselling author, Eric Blehm; and illustrated by award-winning illustrator, Christopher Adams. Elementary school teacher Barbara Allen compiled a CD featuring eleven songs sung by her and her class all relating to Molly.
