= The Halls of Ivy =

American situation comedy

The Halls of Ivy is an American situation comedy that ran from 1950 to 1952 on NBC radio, created by Fibber McGee & Molly co-creator/writer Don Quinn. The series was adapted into a CBS television comedy (1954–55) produced by ITC Entertainment and Television Programs of America. British husband-and-wife actors Ronald Colman and Benita Hume starred in both versions of the show.

Quinn developed the show after he had decided to leave Fibber McGee & Molly in the hands of his protégé Phil Leslie. The Halls of Ivy's audition program featured radio veteran Gale Gordon (then co-starring in Our Miss Brooks) and Edna Best in the roles that ultimately went to the Colmans, who demonstrated a flair for radio comedy during the late 1940s recurring roles on The Jack Benny Program.

== Radio series ==
The Halls of Ivy
- Genre: Situation comedy
- Running time: 30 minutes
- Country of origin: United States
- Language: English
- Home station: NBC
- Starring: Ronald Colman; Benita Hume; Willard Waterman; Bea Benaderet; Elizabeth Patterson; Alan Reed
- Created by: Don Quinn
- Original release: January 6, 1950 – June 25, 1952
- No. of series: 3
- No. of episodes: 109
- Audio format: Monaural
- Sponsored by: Schlitz beer

The Halls of Ivy featured Ronald Colman as William Todhunter Hall, the president of small, Midwestern Ivy College, and Benita Hume as his wife, Victoria, a former British musical comedy star who sometimes feels the tug of her former profession, and followed their interactions with students, friends, and college trustees. Others in the cast included Herb Butterfield as testy board chairman Clarence Wellman, Willard Waterman (then starring as Harold Peary's successor as The Great Gildersleeve) as board member John Merriweather, and Bea Benaderet, Elizabeth Patterson, and Gloria Gordon as the Halls' maids. Alan Reed (television's Fred Flintstone) appeared periodically as the stuffy English teacher, Professor Heaslip. Other actors who appeared included Virginia Gregg, Lee Patrick, Jean Vander Pyl, Rolfe Sedan, Sidney Miller, William Tracy, Sam Edwards, Arthur Q. Bryan, Barton Yarborough, James Gleason, Jerry Hausner and other actors.

The series ran 109 half-hour radio episodes from January 6, 1950, to June 25, 1952, with Quinn, Jerome Lawrence and Robert Lee writing many of the scripts and giving free if even more sophisticated play to Quinn's knack for language play, inverted cliches and swift puns (including the show's title and lead characters), a knack he'd shown for years writing Fibber McGee & Molly. Jerome Lawrence and Robert Lee continued as a writing team; their best-known play is Inherit the Wind. Cameron Blake, Walter Brown Newman, Robert Sinclair, and Milton and Barbara Merlin became writers for the program as well.

In subject matter, the program was often notably ahead of its time, forward looking, and willing to tackle controversial topics. "Hell Week," first broadcast on January 2, 1952, boldly addressed the unforeseen dangers of college fraternity hazing. "The Leslie Hoff Painting" (September 27, 1950) and "The Chinese Student" (February 7, 1950) both openly countenanced and dealt with instances of racial bigotry. Another episode centered on an unmarried student's pregnancy.

But listeners were surprised to discover that the episode of January 24, 1951, "The Goya Bequest"—a story examining the bequest of a Goya painting that was suspected of being a fraud hyped by its late owner to avoid paying customs duties when bringing to the United States—was written by Colman, who poked fun at his accomplishment while taking a rare turn giving the evening's credits at the show's conclusion.

A further treat was the episode of November 22, 1951, in which Jack Benny appeared as himself, in a storyline involving his accepting Victoria Hall's invitation to perform for charity at Ivy College.

The sponsor was the Joseph Schlitz Brewing Company ("The Beer That Made Milwaukee Famous"). Nat Wolff produced and directed. Henry Russell handled the music and co-wrote the theme with Vick Knight. Radio veteran Ken Carpenter was the announcer.

The radio program received a Peabody Award in 1950.

== Television series (1954–1955) ==
For the television series the Colmans and Butterfield repeated their radio roles with Mary Wickes as Alice, the Halls' housekeeper, and Ray Collins, later of Perry Mason, as Professor Merriweather. The TV version premiered on October 19, 1954, and ran for 38 half-hour black-and-white episodes. Its last airing was September 29, 1955.

Many television episodes are missing so that some credits and episode titles are unknown. It is known, however, that Ronald Colman personally supervised production of the TV series, with William Frye as producer, under executive producer Leon Fromkess. John Lupton, later of the western series Broken Arrow, and Jerry Paris, later of The Dick Van Dyke Show, appeared in some episodes as students. The creator of the television version was Don Quinn and virtually all of the scripts were adapted from those originally heard on radio. Arthur Q. Bryan played Professor Warren, head of the college's history department, a role he also had on the radio program.

The Halls of Ivy aired at 8:30 p.m. ET on Tuesdays over CBS, after The Red Skelton Show, for alternate sponsors International Harvester and Nabisco.
