= Don Quinn =

American comedy writer (1900–1967)

- Quinn circa 1939
- Born: November 18, 1900; Grand Rapids, Michigan, U.S.
- Died: December 30, 1967 (aged 67); Los Angeles, California, U.S.
- Occupation(s): Cartoonist, writer
- Years active: 1920s-1965
- Spouses: Garnette Steve Quinn (died 1938): Edythe Quinn (m. 1940s-1967; his death)

Don Quinn (November 18, 1900 – December 30, 1967) was an American comedy writer who started out as a cartoonist based in Chicago. According to sources, Quinn's career as a cartoonist was short-lived but his career as a writer began after he realized that the magazines and newspapers threw away his drawings he sent in but kept his captions.

Quinn was best known as the sole writer (later head writer to Phil Leslie) of the popular old-time radio show Fibber McGee and Molly for 17 years and as the writer for the program's stars Jim and Marian Jordan for 20 years.

Quinn was also the creator/head writer of radio's The Beulah Show, (a Fibber McGee spinoff), and radio and television's The Halls of Ivy. Quinn also created the popular Throckmorton P. Gildersleeve character on Fibber McGee and Molly.

== Career ==
Quinn was born in November 1900 in Grand Rapids, Michigan. Not much is known about his early life nor is much known about his early career as a cartoonist. However, what little is known is that after discovering that, even though his drawings were thrown away by magazines, his captions were kept, Quinn found a job at WENR in Chicago writing for some of the up-and-coming comedians there.

It was there where Quinn met Jim and Marian Jordan in 1931. The Jordans at the time were veterans of Vaudeville and had previously worked at rival station WIBO. The pair already had starred in two programs on WENR, Luke and Mirandy from 1927-1931 and The Smith Family from 1929-1932. Quinn was hired to write scripts for The Smith Family.

That same year, the three of them created Smackout which debuted March 2 on WMAQ. Smackout, a revised version of Luke and Mirandy centered around Jim Jordan in the role of Luke Gray, a proprietor of a general store that was brimming with stock but yet "smack out" of everything, who loved to tell a good tall tale to his customers. The program was picked up by NBC's Blue Network for national syndication in 1933 and remained there until the summer of 1935.

After the wife of a Johnson Wax executive heard the program, the Jordans and Quinn moved to their more memorable radio series Fibber McGee and Molly. Quinn was famous for delaying the actual writing of the scripts. Many from the show remember that he would wait until the last minute then lock himself in his office with a big plate of sandwiches, a huge pot of coffee, and two cartons of cigarettes. And hours later, he would emerge with a fresh script rarely in need of revision.

From the start of the show, Quinn was full partner and by 1941, the Jordans and Quinn were splitting a $6000 paycheck three ways. Fibber McGee co-star Gale Gordon once recalled that Quinn would sometimes send his ideas to other radio comedians including Fred Allen. In 1943, Phil Leslie became Quinn's writing assistant on the show. Quinn left at the end of the 1949-50 radio season to pursue other projects.

In 1945, Quinn created The Beulah Show for CBS Radio. The program spun off Fibber McGee character Beulah Brown. Beulah was the McGee's maid on radio. Beulah ran on CBS from 1945-1954 and had a television run on ABC from 1950-1952.

In 1950, Quinn created The Halls of Ivy a lighthearted comedy about a professor, William Todhunter Hall, the president of Ivy, a small Midwestern College, and his wife, Victoria, a former British musical comedy star who sometimes felt the tug of her former profession, and followed their interactions with students, friends, and college trustees.

The audition episode originally starred Gale Gordon, (of Our Miss Brooks fame), and Edna Best as William and Victoria Hall. Gordon and Best were replaced by Ronald Colman and Benita Hume during the show's actual radio run; they had made a lasting impression with their numerous appearances on The Jack Benny Program in the late 1940s.

The program debuted on NBC Radio in January 1950 and ran until May 1952. Quinn served as the sole writer on the program. The show also had a short television run during the 1954-55 television season on CBS. The Colmans reprised their roles from the radio series, and Quinn also wrote for the television series as well. The television show lost in the ratings, in part, due to its timeslot, Tuesday night at 8:30, against the last half of NBC's rotating trio of programs: The Milton Berle Show, The Bob Hope Show and The Martha Raye Show.

Quinn broke into television in 1953 as a story editor for the Four Star Playhouse. He would write an episode of the series in 1956. In addition to these two episodes, Quinn also wrote several episodes of Climax!, The Dinah Shore Chevy Show, The Addams Family and Petticoat Junction.

According to the Internet Movie Database, Quinn also composed the theme song to the short-lived Desilu-CBS western series Yancy Derringer.

== Personal life ==
Quinn was married twice. His first wife, Garnette Steve, died in 1938 in a fatal car crash in which her car drove off the road and spun several times. He remarried several years later to Edythe Quinn (August 18, 1909–February 25, 1978). Edythe Quinn was a former reporter with the Chicago American. Quinn had no children.

Quinn died on December 30, 1967 at the age of 67. According to author Tony Scott, Quinn had been sick for some time and his death was barely reported in the newspapers. Quinn and his widow Edythe are buried in Hollywood Forever Cemetery in Los Angeles. Their grave is located inside the Cathedral Mausoleum Alcove of Devotion.

== Filmography ==
=== Film ===
Year	Title	Role	Notes
1941	Look Who's Laughing	Writer	Material for Fibber McGee and Molly
1942	Here We Go Again	Writer	Material for Fibber McGee and Molly
1944	Heavenly Days	Writer	Wrote screenplay
1945	The All-Star Bond Rally	Writer	Film short
1957	Public Pigeon No. 1	Writer	Wrote story

=== Radio ===
Year	Title	Role	Notes
1931-1932	The Smith Family	Writer	
1931-1935	Smackout	Writer	
1935-1950	Fibber McGee and Molly	Writer	Sole writer until 1943; Head writer over Phil Leslie, 1943-1950
1949	The Beulah Show	Creator	
1950-1952	The Halls of Ivy	Writer	

=== Television ===
Year	Title	Role	Notes
1953	Four Star Playhouse	Story editor	1 episode
1954-1955	The Halls of Ivy	Writer	33 episodes
1955	Climax!	Writer	1 episode
1956	Four Star Playhouse	Writer	1 episode
1958	Yancy Derringer	Theme song composer	
1960	The Dinah Shore Chevy Show	Writer	1 episode
1963	Petticoat Junction	Script consultant	9 episodes
1965	The Addams Family	Writer	1 episode
