= The Charlotte Greenwood Show =

1944–1946 U.S. radio situation comedy

- Other names: The Hallmark Charlotte Greenwood Show
- Genre: Situation Comedy
- Running time: 30 minutes
- Country of origin: United States
- Language: English
- Syndicates: NBC; ABC radio networks
- Starring: Charlotte Greenwood (1890-1977)
- Announcer: Wendell Niles
- Written by: Ray Singer; Phil Leslie; Jack Hasty; Don Johnson
- Produced by: John Guedel; Thomas Freebairn Smith; Arnold McGuire
- Original release: June 13, 1944 – January 6, 1946
- Sponsored by: Pepsodent (1944); Hallmark Cards (1945–46)

The Charlotte Greenwood Show is an old-time radio situation comedy broadcast in the United States, on the National Broadcasting Company (NBC) radio network. It aired for three months from June 13 to September 5, 1944, and then later on the newly established third American broadcasting media network of the American Broadcasting Company (ABC radio network, airing from October 15, 1944 to January 6, 1946.

== Background ==
The program began as a summer replacement for The Bob Hope Show (1948-1955) on the NBC radio network. Newspaper syndicated gossip and entertainment / celebrity news columnist Hedda Hopper (1885-1966) reported, "The interesting thing is that she (Charlotte Greenwood, 1890-1977) got the job on a couple of scripts written by her husband, Martin Broones, who's never before written for radio."

== Format ==
The 1944 short summer version of the show on the NBC Blue Network (1927-1945), had comedienne Greenwood, playing herself, working as a cub reporter in a small newspaper as research in preparation for a future film role. When the program resurfaced in 1945 on the newly established ABC independent radio network, Greenwood's character had now the responsibility of raising three children, teenagers Jack and Barbara and little Robert after her good friend died, making her executor of the estate. The setting was the fictional town of "Lakeview".

An old time radio reference commented that Greenwood's character "managed to be single, moral, and peppy."

== Characters, cast and personnel ==
The main characters of the latter program and the actors portraying them are shown in the table below.

Character	Actor/actress
Jack Barton	Cliff Carpenter, Edward Ryan
Barbara Barton	Janet Waldo, Betty Moran
Robert Barton	Dix Davis, Bobby Larson
Judge Cronin	Charles Cantor
William Anderson	John Brown
Mr. Reynolds	Edward Arnold

Others in the cast were Shirley Mitchell, Arthur Q. Bryan, Harry Bartell and Will Wright. Wendell Niles was the announcer. The writers included Jack Hasty, Don Johnson, Ray Singer, and Phil Leslie. The producers included Arnold McGuire.
