= Phil Leslie =

American screenwriter (1909–1988)

Phil L. Leslie (March 11, 1909 – September 23, 1988) was an American comedy writer who was born in St. Louis, Missouri. His first career, since he was good at arithmetic, was keeping books for a local bank in St. Louis, but he began pursuing a career in writing.

In 1938, he and his wife, Helen, took their four children (Ann, Jane, Sue and Phil Jr.), by train, to Hollywood, California in the hopes of making it big. His comedy writing skills were soon recognized and he began writing with Don Quinn on the Fibber McGee and Molly radio program as co-writer. After Don left the show to pursue other interests, Leslie became the main writer.* Phil Leslie

Leslie also was a writer for The Charlotte Greenwood Show on radio. He graduated from radio to television and wrote episodes of The Addams Family, The Lucy Show, Here's Lucy, Dennis the Menace, Dobie Gillis, Mr. Ed, The Brady Bunch, and many others.

== Other ==
Phil Jr. would follow his father's passion for business and start what would become the largest retail pool supply company in the world, Leslie's Poolmart. Leslie Sr., died on September 23, 1988, aged 79, one day after his son lost control of the company he built to a venture capitalist group.
