= Herb Butterfield =

American actor (1895–1957)

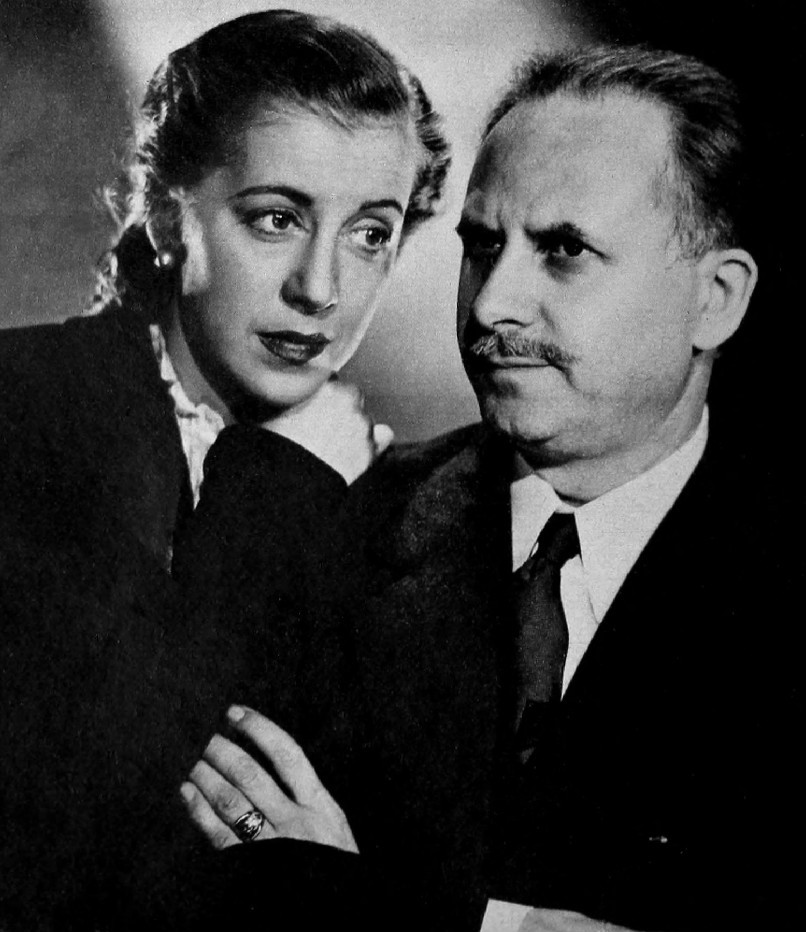
- Butterfield and Muriel Bremner as Mr. & Mrs. Carter Colby in the radio program Lonely Women.
- Born: October 28, 1895; Providence, Rhode Island, U.S.
- Died: May 2, 1957 (aged 61); Los Angeles, California, US
- Education: Brown University (BA); University of London; American Academy of Dramatic Arts; University of Iowa (MA)
- Occupation: Actor

Herbert Butterfield (October 28, 1895 – May 2, 1957) was an actor best known for his work in American radio.

== Early life and career ==
Born in Providence, Rhode Island, Butterfield graduated with a BA from Brown University before serving in World War I in France and Germany. After the war, he attended University of London, the American Academy of Dramatic Arts, and earned his MA from the University of Iowa.

Perhaps his major roles on radio were those of crime-lab expert Lee Jones (as well as many supporting characters) in Dragnet, and The Commissioner in Dangerous Assignment.

Butterfield acted in dozens of roles on Broadway Is My Beat. His other roles in radio programs included: Rex Kramer on Dan Harding's Wife, Ziehm in Girl Alone, Clarence Wellman in The Halls of Ivy, Weissoul in Jack Armstrong, the All-American Boy, Preacher Jim in Kitty Keene, Inc., Judge Carter Colby in Lonely Women, Phineas Herringbone in Ma Perkins, Judge Glenn Hunter in One Man's Family, and Judge Colby in Today's Children. He also was the last actor to play Inspector Richard Queen in The Adventures of Ellery Queen on radio.

Butterfield's limited activity on television included reprising his roles of Clarence Wellman in The Halls of Ivy and The Commissioner in Dangerous Assignment. He appeared in many episodes of the TV version of Dragnet and in an episode of Colgate Theatre. He also appeared as kindly old man on Father Knows Best in season 3 episode 6. He also had roles in a few movies, including The House on Telegraph Hill and Shield for Murder.

== Filmography ==
| Year | Title | Role | Notes |
|---|---|---|---|
| 1950 | Never Fear | Walter Williams | |
| 1951 | The House on Telegraph Hill | Joseph C. Callahan | |
| 1953 | The I Don't Care Girl | Doctor | Uncredited |
| 1953 | A Blueprint for Murder | Judge at Preliminary Hearing | Uncredited |
| 1954 | Shield for Murder | Cabot | |
| 1955 | The Tender Trap | Minister | Voice, Uncredited |
| 1955 | The Fighting Chance | Tipsy Man | Uncredited |
| 1956 | The Ten Commandments | Royal Physician | Uncredited |
