= Public Pigeon No. 1 =

1957 film by Norman Z. McLeod

- Directed by: Norman Z. McLeod
- Screenplay by: Harry Tugend; Devery Freeman
- Story by: Don Quinn; Larry Berns
- Starring: Red Skelton; Vivian Blaine; Janet Blair
- Cinematography: Paul C. Vogel
- Edited by: Otto Ludwig
- Music by: Matty Malneck; David Rose
- Production company: Val-Ritchie Productions
- Distributed by: RKO Teleradio Pictures; Universal-International
- Release dates: May 19, 1957 (New York City); June 5, 1957 (Los Angeles)
- Running time: 79 minutes
- Country: United States
- Language: English

Public Pigeon No. 1 is a 1957 American comedy film directed by Norman Z. McLeod and starring Red Skelton, Vivian Blaine and Janet Blair. It is the theatrical feature-length remake of the Climax! television episode "Public Pigeon #1" that also starred Red Skelton, but was directed by Seymour Berns, which aired in the second season of that show on September 8, 1955.

== Plot ==
Rusty Morgan is irresponsible, but girlfriend Edith Enders trusts him. They put their money in a joint bank account.

A con man, Harvey Baker, is able to persuade Rusty to buy his worthless uranium certificates, claiming they are worth $10,000. His cronies Rita and Frankie take the swindle further, resulting in Rusty losing his job at a cafe and Lt. Qualen of the bunco squad letting him know that these are wanted crooks with a $10,000 reward on their heads.

Rusty accidentally finds out where Rita is and follows her. He is so gullible, he believes it when told they are agents working secretly for the FBI. He ends up a pigeon for their scheme, arrested and sentenced to five years in prison.

No one could be this stupid, the crooks conclude, and mistakenly believe Rusty has their stolen money in a safety deposit box. Edith concocts a scheme with Qualen to break Rusty out of jail so the crooks will follow him. Qualen ends up arresting the lot, and Rusty and Edith get to share the $10,000 reward.

== Cast ==
- Red Skelton as Rusty Morgan
- Janet Blair as Edith Enders
- Vivian Blaine as Rita DeLacey
- Jay C. Flippen as Lt. Ross Quelan
- Allyn Joslyn as Harvey Baker
- Lyle Latell as Police Sergeant Ryan

== Critical reception ==
The New York Times, "Anyone amused by this Universal-International comedy, released by R. K. O. and teaming Mr. Skelton with Vivian Blaine and Janet Blair, will laugh at anything. Disbelievers are urged to see it. See it, and suffer."
