= Jim Jordan (actor) =

American radio and film actor (1896–1988)

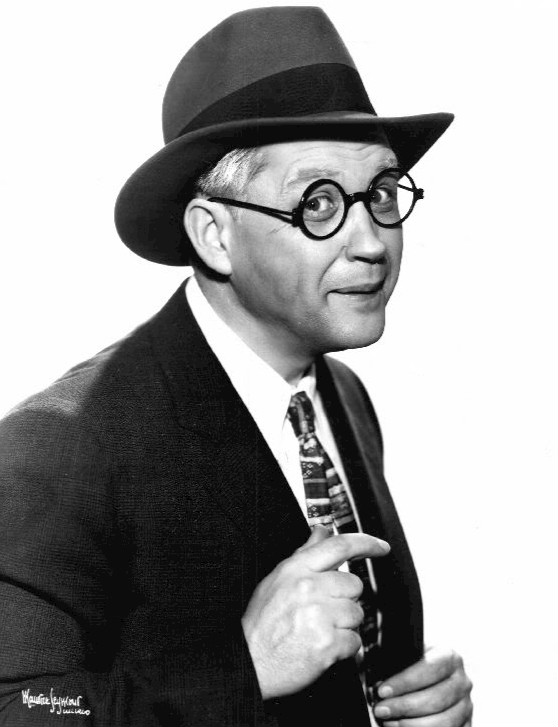
- Jordan as Fibber McGee in 1935
- Born: James Edward Jordan; November 16, 1896; Peoria, Illinois
- Died: April 1, 1988 (aged 91); Beverly Hills, California
- Occupation: Actor
- Years active: 1920s–1977
- Spouses: Marian Jordan (m. 1918; died 1961) Gretchen Stewart (m. 1962)
- Children: 3
- Career
- Show: Fibber McGee and Molly
- Style: Comedy
- Country: United States

James Edward Jordan (November 16, 1896 – April 1, 1988) was an American actor and radio personality. He is best known for playing Fibber McGee in Fibber McGee and Molly and voiced the albatross Orville in Disney's The Rescuers (1977).

== Biography ==
Jordan was born in 1896 on a farm near Peoria, Illinois. He attended St. John's Church in Peoria, and his family eventually sold the farm and moved into Peoria. It was at church choir practice that he met Marian Driscoll, whom he married on August 31, 1918.

=== With Marian ===
Jim Jordan went on the vaudeville circuit, both as a solo act and with his wife, Marian, at various times until 1924. They went entirely broke in 1923, having to be wired money by their parents to get back to Peoria from Lincoln, Illinois.

Jim and Marian Jordan got their major break in radio while performing in Chicago in 1924; Jim said he could give a better performance than the singers they were listening to on the radio, and his brother Byron bet $10 that Jim couldn't do it. By the end of the evening, Jim and Marian had their first radio contract, at $10 per show for 26 weeks as The O'Henry Twins, sponsored by Oh Henry! candy.

The Jordans would work as a double act for the remainder of their careers, seldom appearing separate from each other, with Jim as the comic foil and Marian as the stooge. From 1931 to 1935, they produced the low-budget sitcom Smackout, in which they portrayed most of the characters (including semi-fictional versions of themselves). In 1935, the couple, along with head writer Don Quinn, teamed up to create Fibber McGee and Molly, a weekly sitcom that was given a larger budget and an ensemble cast.

Fibber McGee and Molly would run as a weekly series, becoming one of radio's most popular programs, until 1953. It wasn't a commentary on scripted radio as a medium, but was about Marian's health, which was beginning to fail. The show would transition to a pre-recorded daily sitcom from 1953 to 1956, then to a short-form weekly series (under the name Just Molly and Me) for Monitor from 1957 to 1959.

In 1959, Fibber McGee and Molly was finally adapted for television, after years of resistance. Marian was too ill to continue, and for reasons unexplained (nothing in the radio series had identified the age of either of the McGees), neither Jim nor Don Quinn (nor Quinn's successor as head writer of the radio show, Phil Leslie) transitioned to the new series; new writers were brought in, and both the McGees were recast. The television version of Fibber McGee and Molly, with Bob Sweeney as Fibber, was a critical and commercial failure.

=== After Marian ===
Marian Jordan died in April 1961. Jim Jordan married Gretchen Stewart (1909–1998), the widow of radio comic Harry Stewart (Yogi Yorgesson) in 1962; they remained married for the rest of his life, and he remained in semi-retirement, other than a brief comeback in the mid-1970s when Jordan appeared in an episode of Chico and the Man, did voice work for The Rescuers and appeared in a public service announcement for AARP.

In March 1988, Jordan fell at his home and suffered a major stroke. Left comatose for over a week, he never regained consciousness and died on April 1. His death came shortly before voice actors were being hired for The Rescuers Down Under; in acknowledgement of Jordan's death, Roy E. Disney wrote his character out of the script (John Candy would play the character's brother instead). He is buried next to Marian Jordan in the Saint Ann section of Holy Cross Cemetery, Culver City, and is next to the plot of Sharon Tate.

== Filmography ==
- This Way Please (1937) – Fibber McGee
- Look Who's Laughing (1941) – Fibber McGee
- Here We Go Again (1942) – Fibber McGee
- Heavenly Days (1944) – Fibber McGee / Ghost of fife player
- The Rescuers (1977) – Orville (voice) (final film role)
