= Smackout =

American old-time radio series

- Other names: Smackout – The Crossroads of the Air
- Genre: Sitcom
- Running time: 15 minutes
- Country of origin: United States
- Language: English
- Home station: WMAQ
- Syndicates: Blue Network
- Starring: Jim Jordan; Marian Jordan
- Created by: Don Quinn
- Written by: Don Quinn; Jim Jordan; Marian Jordan
- Recording studio: Studio C (Chicago, Illinois)
- Original release: March 2, 1931 – August 30, 1935

Smackout (originally premiered as Smackout – The Crossroads of the Air) was an American old-time radio series and was arguably the first and earliest example of the situation comedy (sitcom) genre and format. The series revolves around a general store in Chicago and the store's proprietor Luke Gray, played by Jim Jordan. Whenever a customer came into the general store to ask Uncle Luke, as Gray was affectionately known, for something, the typical response from Luke would be "we're smack out of that" (hence the title of the show). But that never stopped Luke from telling one of his signature tall tales to the customer. Jordan also played a regular customer named Jim and Marian Jordan portrayed the main roles as Teeny, a little girl and regular customer, and Marian, Jim's girlfriend.

Smackout was broadcast from Chicago's NBC radio affiliate WMAQ before becoming nationally syndicated through the NBC Blue Network beginning in April 1933. New episodes of Smackout were broadcast six days a week from March 2, 1931, to August 30, 1935. The series, after capturing the eye of the wife of an executive at Johnson Wax, was the basis to Jim and Marian Jordan's more successful and memorable radio series Fibber McGee and Molly.

== Premise ==
The radio show Smackout revolves around a general store in Chicago and its customers. Outside of its customers, Smackout mainly stars Jim Jordan's character of Luke Gray who is known affectionately as Uncle Luke. Luke is the grizzled old proprietor of the general store located in the small community of Smackout Corners. In their exhaustive biography of Jim and Marian Jordan, historians Tom Price and Charles Stumpf describe the character of Luke; "His favorite pastimes were whittling and pitching horseshoes, which he would rather do than tend to the store. Frequently, Luke would deny that the store was open, and almost always told customers he was 'smack out' of whatever it was they were asking for ..... However, he was always well-stocked with a goodly supply of tall tales, such as the one about the time he taught some woodpeckers to tap out messages into Morse code, and another one about the time he grew square tomatoes to use in bacon, lettuce and tomato sandwiches."

In addition to playing Luke, Jim Jordan also played the radio version of himself, a young Smackout Corners regular known only by the name of "Jim". Jim would enliven the episodes by singing while his girlfriend Marian, played by his real-life wife Marian Jordan, accompanied him on the store's piano. Jim and Marian Jordan provided voice of all the characters on the series. Jim's larynx contained such personalities as Augie Pigmeyer, the German immigrant farmer, village idiot Perky McSnark; local conman Squire Lovejoy; and Luke's old crony, Mort Toops. In addition to playing Marian, Marian Jordan also played the roles of Teeny, a young girl who always "bothered the whey out of" crusty old Luke, Mrs. J. High-Hat Upson, Widow Wheedledeck, and Bertha Boop. It was estimated that during the four-and-a-half-year run of the series, between the Jordans provided voices for 150 characters during the series.

== The Jordans ==
=== Early lives ===
The stars and only performers on the series were James Edward "Jim" Jordan (November 16, 1896–April 1, 1988) and Marian Irene Driscoll (April 15, 1898–April 7, 1961) who were both natives of Peoria, Illinois.

Jordan was the seventh of eight children born to James Edward Jordan and Mary (née Tighe) Jordan, while Driscoll was the twelfth out of thirteen children born to Daniel P. and Anna (née Carroll) Driscoll. The son of a farmer, Jim wanted to be a singer; Marian, the daughter of a coal miner, wanted to be a music teacher. Both attended the same Catholic church, where they met at choir practice. Marian's parents had attempted to discourage her professional singing and acting aspirations. When she started seeing young Jim Jordan, the Driscolls were far from approving of Jim and his ideas. Jim's voice teacher gave him a recommendation for work as a professional in Chicago, and he followed it. He was able to have steady work but soon tired of the life on the road. In less than a year, Jim came back to Peoria and went to work for the Post Office. His profession was now acceptable to Marian's parents, and they stopped objecting to the couple's marriage plans. The pair were married in Peoria on August 31, 1918.

=== Vaudeville and early radio days ===
Shortly after Jim was drafted into the army, he fell ill and was honorably discharged. After he returned home to Peoria, the couple decided to go into the Vaudeville circuit. The couple did several small-town vaudeville acts before going into radio.

While staying with Jim's brother in Chicago in 1924, the family was listening to the radio; Jim said that he and Marian could do better than the musical act currently on the air. Jim's brother bet him $10 that they could not. To win the bet, Jim and Marian went to WIBO, where they were immediately put on the air. At the end of the performance, the station offered the couple a contract for a weekly show which paid $10 per week. The sponsor of the show was Oh Henry! candy, and they appeared for six months on The Oh Henry! Twins program and on The Air Scouts program before switching to radio station WENR in 1927. The first series they did on WENR was entitled Luke and Mirandy, the basis for Smackout. In that series, Jim played a farmer who was given to tall tales and face-saving lies for comic effect. In 1929, the Jordans starred in their second of two weekly series on WENR, this one entitled The Smith Family. That series, which ran until 1932, starred the Jordans as a police officer and his Irish long-suffering wife. The Smith Family is often regarded as the first and earliest example of the soap opera.

== From WENR to Smackout ==
In 1931, the Jordans hired Donald "Don" Quinn to serve as their writer for The Smith Family. Quinn was an out of work cartoonist who was then working in radio for WENR. And it was while working on the WENR farm report, Jim Jordan heard a true story about a shopkeeper from Missouri whose store was brimming with stock, yet he claimed to be "smack out" of whatever a customer would ask him for. The story reached the halls of nearby Columbia College, and the students began visiting the store, which they called "Smackout", to hear the owner's incredible stories.

Quinn and Jordan decided to take their idea of Smackout to Chicago station WMAQ which had just recently become an affiliate of the National Broadcasting Company. Smackout premiered on March 2, 1931 under the title Smackout – The Crossroads of the Air. The series was set in a rural hamlet and revolved around the operation of a general store and its owner who always refuses services to his customers but never refuses to tell the customers a good tall tale.

The series was broadcast on a sustaining basis. However, the ratings were just as good as if the show was sponsored. Ratings were so good that NBC decided to syndicate it nationally over its Blue Network beginning in April 1933.

In 1933, Mrs. Henrietta Johnson Lewis (or Louis depending on certain sources) took an interest in Smackout and, more importantly, Quinn and the Jordans. Lewis was the daughter of an executive at the Johnson Wax Company and saw potential in the power trio. At that same time, Johnson Wax was looking for a new program to sponsor. Lewis saw potential in the Jordans and decided to give them a show of their own entitled Fibber McGee and Molly with Quinn serving as head writer. The character of Luke Gray was the basis of the Fibber McGee character and the character of Teeny was brought on to the series virtually unchanged. The start of Fibber McGee in April 1935 was the end of Smackout which broadcast its last episode on August 31, 1935.

== Cast and characters ==
Jim and Marian Jordan played and provided voices for all the characters on the series. It is estimated that they provided voices to over 150 characters during the entire run of the series. Below is a list of all the main and supporting characters they portrayed during the course of the series;

Jim Jordan:

- "Uncle" Luke Gray (Note: The character of Fibber McGee on radio's Fibber McGee and Molly was based on Luke Gray.) - The main protagonist of the series, Luke Gray, affectionately known as Uncle Luke, is the proprietor of the Smackout Corners General Store. Luke usually claims that the store is smack out of whatever a customer would ask for sometimes even claiming the store was closed when it was obviously open.
- Augie Pigmeyer- A German immigrant farmer and regular customer.
- Perky McSnark - The village idiot.
- Squire Lovejoy - A notorious con-man.
- Mort Toops - A recurring character of the series. Toops is an old crony of Luke's. (Note: Mort Toops and his family would become silent characters on Fibber McGee and Molly, where they served as the McGees' neighbors.)

Marian Jordan:

- Teeny (Note: The character of Teeny was continued on Fibber McGee still portrayed by Marian Jordan. Teeny is virtually unchanged and unmodified.) - A little girl and a regular customer of Luke's. Teeny is Luke's precocious and incredulous little friend.
- Mrs. J. High-Hat Upson - A regular, who saw herself as upper-class and superior to the rest of the community. (Note: The character of Mrs. Upson would later be adapted to Fibber McGee as Abigail Uppington, with Isabel Randolph taking the role.)
- Widow Wheedledeck - A recently widowed regular.
- Bertha Boop - A regular.
- Mrs. Bedelia Thomas
- Geraldine

In addition to the litany of fictional characters, Jim and Marian also appeared as semi-fictional versions of themselves, portraying themselves as regulars at the store. It was under their own identities that the duo often performed musical pieces, with Jim singing and Marian at the piano.

== Broadcast history ==
During its whole run, Smackout was broadcast Monday through Saturday at 2:30 pm EST, 1:30 pm Chicago time.

== Critical reception ==
Author Laura L. Enright in her book Chicago's Most Wanted™: The Top 10 Book of Murderous Mobsters, Midway Monsters, and Windy City Oddities ranked Smackout the number 8 Chicago-based radio show of all time.

== See also ==
- Cheese Shop sketch
- “Olympia Café”
