= Fibber McGee and Molly =

American radio comedy series

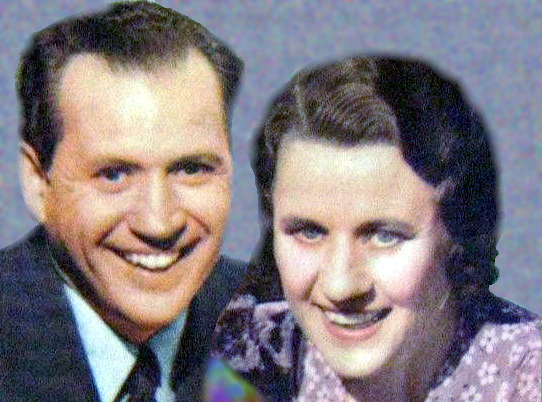
- Jim and Marian Jordan as Fibber McGee and Molly in 1941
- Country of origin: United States
- Language: English
- Home station: WMAQ AM; NBC
- Starring: Jim Jordan; Marian Jordan
- Announcer: Harlow Wilcox
- Created by: Jim Jordan; Marian Jordan; Donald Quinn
- Written by: Donald Quinn; Phil Leslie
- Original release: April 16, 1935 – October 2, 1959
- No. of episodes: 1611
- Opening theme: "Save Your Sorrow (For Tomorrow)" by Al Sherman and B.G. DeSylva (1935–40); "Wing to Wing" by Billy Mills (1940–59)
- Sponsored by: Johnson's Wax; Pet Milk; Reynolds Aluminum

Fibber McGee and Molly (1935–1959) was a longtime American husband-and-wife team radio comedy program.

The situation comedy was a staple of the NBC Red Network from 1936 on, after originating on NBC Blue in 1935. One of the most popular and enduring radio series of its time, it ran as a stand-alone series from 1935 to 1956, and then continued as a short-form series as part of the weekend Monitor from 1957 to 1959. The title characters were created and portrayed by Jim and Marian Jordan, a husband-and-wife team that had been working in radio since the 1920s.

Fibber McGee and Molly followed up the Jordans' previous radio sitcom Smackout. It featured the misadventures of a working-class couple: habitual storyteller Fibber McGee and his sometimes terse but always loving wife Molly, living among their numerous neighbors and acquaintances in the community of Wistful Vista. As with radio comedies of the era, Fibber McGee and Molly featured an announcer, house band and vocal quartet for interludes. At the peak of the show's success in the 1940s, it was adapted into a string of feature films. A 1959 attempt to adapt the series to television with a different cast and new writers was both a critical and commercial failure, which, coupled with Marian Jordan's death shortly thereafter, brought the series to a finish.

== Husband and wife in real life ==
The stars of the program were husband-and-wife team Jim Jordan (1896–1988) and Marian Driscoll Jordan (1898–1961), who were natives of Peoria, Illinois.

Jordan was the seventh of eight children born to James Edward Jordan, a farmer, and Mary (née Tighe) Jordan, while Driscoll was the twelfth of thirteen children born to Daniel P., a coalminer, and wife Anna (née Carroll) Driscoll.

Jim wanted to be a singer, and Marian wanted to be a music teacher. Both attended the same Catholic church, where they met at choir practice. Marian's parents had attempted to discourage her professional aspirations. When she started seeing Jim Jordan, the Driscolls were far from approving of either him or his ideas. Jim's voice teacher gave him a recommendation for work as a professional in Chicago, and he followed it. He was able to gain steady employment, but soon tired of the life on the road. In less than a year, Jim came back to Peoria and went to work for the Post Office. Marian's parents now found Jim (and his career) to be acceptable, and they stopped objecting to the couple's marriage plans. The pair married in Peoria, August 31, 1918.

Five days after the wedding, Jim received his draft notice. He was sent to France, and became part of a military touring group which entertained the armed forces after World War I. When Jim came home from France, he and Marian decided to try their luck with a vaudeville act. They had 2 children, Kathryn Therese Jordan (1920–2007) and James Carroll Jordan (1923–1998). Marian returned home for the birth of Kathryn, but went back to performing with Jim, leaving her with Jim's parents. After Jim Jr. was born, Marian stayed with the children for a time, while Jim performed a solo act. Marian and the children joined him on the road for a short time, but the couple had to admit defeat when they found themselves in Lincoln, Illinois in 1923 with 2 small children and no funds. The couple's parents had to wire them money for their return to Peoria. Jim went to work at a local department store, but still felt an attraction of being in show business. He and Marian went back into vaudeville.

While staying with Jim's brother in Chicago in 1924, the family was listening to the radio; Jim said he and Marian could do better than the musical act currently on the air. Jim's brother bet him $10 they could not. To win the bet, Jim and Marian went to WIBO, where they were immediately put on the air. At the end of the performance, the station offered the couple a contract for a weekly show, which paid $10 a week. The show's sponsor was Oh Henry! candy, and they appeared for 6 months on The Oh Henry! Twins program, switching to radio station WENR by 1927.

When it seemed to the couple they were financially succeeding, they built a home in Chicago, which was a replica of their rented home, complete to building it on the lot next door. For their 1939 move to the West Coast, the Jordans selected an inconspicuous home in Encino. Some of Jim Jordan's investments included the bottling company for Hires Root Beer in Kansas City.

== From vaudeville to Smackout ==
Fibber McGee and Molly originated when the small-time husband-and-wife vaudevillians began their third year as Chicago-area radio performers. Two of the shows they did for station WENR beginning in 1927, both written by Harry Lawrence, bore traces of what was to come and rank as one of the earliest forms of situation comedy. In their Luke and Mirandy farm-report program, Jim played a farmer who was given to tall tales and face-saving lies for comic effect. In a weekly comedy, The Smith Family, Marian's character was an Irish wife of an American police officer. These characterizations, plus the Jordans' change from being singers/musicians to comic actors, pointed toward their future; it was at this time when Marian developed and perfected the radio character "Teeny". It was also at WENR where the Jordans met Donald Quinn, a cartoonist who was then working in radio, and the couple hired him as their writer in 1931. They regarded Quinn's contribution as important and included him as a full partner; the salary for Smackout and Fibber McGee and Molly was split between the Jordans and Quinn.

While working on the WENR farm report, Jim Jordan heard a true story about a shopkeeper from Missouri whose store was brimming with stock, yet he claimed to be "smack out" of whatever a customer would ask him for, though he always had tall tales in stock. The story reached the halls of nearby Columbia College, and the students began visiting the store, which they called "Smackout", to hear the owner's incredible stories.

For station WMAQ in Chicago, beginning in April 1931, the trio created Smackout, a 15-minute daily program that centered on a general store and its proprietor, Luke Grey (Jim Jordan), a storekeeper with a penchant for tall tales and a perpetual dearth of whatever his customers wanted: He always seemed "smack out of it". Marian Jordan portrayed both a lady named Marian and a little girl named Teeny, as well as accompanying the program on piano. During the show's run, Marian Jordan voiced a total of 69 different characters. Smackout was picked up by NBC in April 1933 and broadcast nationally until August 1935.

One of the S. C. Johnson company's owners, Henrietta Johnson Lewis, recommended that her husband, John, Johnson Wax's advertising manager, try the show out on a national network. The terms of the agreement between S.C. Johnson and the Jordans awarded the company ownership of the names "Fibber McGee" and "Molly".

== From Smackout to Wistful Vista ==
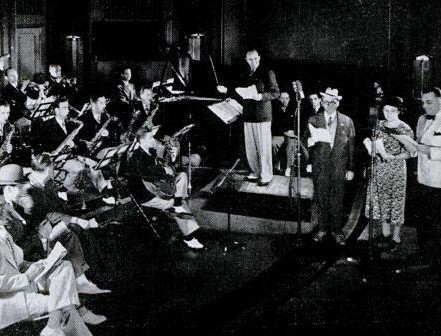
Fibber McGee and Molly with Ted Weems and his Orchestra broadcasting from Chicago in 1937.

If Smackout proved the Jordan-Quinn union's viability, their next creation proved their most enduring. Amplifying Luke Grey's tall talesmanship to Midwestern braggadocio, Quinn developed Fibber McGee and Molly with Jim as the foible-prone Fibber and Marian playing his patient, common sense, honey-natured wife. In its earliest incarnation, Fibber McGee and Molly put focus on Fibber's tall tales and extended monologues. During these earliest episodes of the series, Molly had a pronounced Irish dialect. while Fibber's voice was somewhat higher and more cartoonish; both of the Jordans eventually switched to more realistic, Americanized dialects closer to their own natural tones over the course of the late 1930s as the series evolved into the more familiar domestic sitcom format. The show premiered on NBC April 16, 1935, and though it took three seasons to become an irrevocable hit, it became the country's top-rated radio series. In 1935, Jim Jordan won the Burlington Liars' Club championship with a story about catching an elusive rat.

Their world was fast-paced with schemes that ran quickly and paid little, yet no one living or visiting went wanting, 79 Wistful Vista (the McGees' address from show No. 20, August 1935 onward) became the place their neighbours visited to support their struggle. The McGees won their house in a raffle from Mr. Hagglemeyer's Wistful Vista Development Company, with lottery ticket #131,313, happened upon by chance while on a pleasure drive in their car. With McGee wavering between tasks and schemes (like digging an oil well in the back yard) - Molly was set to provide support for the home, their neighbors and friends. Fibber McGee and Molly built its audience steadily, and found the full volume of that audience in 1940.

Marian Jordan took a protracted absence from the show from November 1937 to April 1939 to deal with a lifelong battle with alcoholism, although this was attributed to "fatigue" in public statements at the time. The show was retitled Fibber McGee and Company during this interregnum, with scripts cleverly working around Molly's absence (Fibber making a speech at a convention, etc.). Comedian ZaSu Pitts appeared on the Fibber McGee and Company show, as did singer Donald Novis.

While his wife was ill, Jim Jordan had been closing his radio shows by saying "Goodnight, Molly." In early 1938, the Federal Communications Commission ordered him to stop, claiming it violated a rule about using public airwaves for personal communications. After a few weeks' deliberation, the Commission found that no regulations had been broken, because Molly was a fictional character. Jordan then resumed using the "Goodnight, Molly" signoff. In January 1939, the show moved from NBC Chicago to the new West Coast Radio City in Hollywood.

== Cast and characters ==
The other cast members circa 1939.

Fibber McGee and Molly was one of the earliest radio comedies to use an ensemble cast of regular characters played by actors other than the leads, nearly all of whom had recurring phrases and running gags, in addition to numerous other peripheral characters unheard from over the course of the series.

=== Main ===
- Fibber McGee (Jim Jordan) – a habitual storyteller and the central figure of the series. Originally portrayed with a cartoonish accent, the character settled into using Jordan's own natural voice by the early 1940s.
- Molly McGee (Marian Jordan) – Fibber's Irish wife and the straight woman of the double act. Her traditional putdown, "'Tain't funny McGee!", appears in the very first episode.

=== Recurring ===
- Throckmorton P. Gildersleeve (Harold Peary) – the pompous next-door neighbor with whom Fibber enjoyed twitting and arguing. Introduced in 1939, Gildersleeve went through several incarnations and first names, all voiced by Peary, before settling on Throckmorton. Many of his interactions with Fibber include the catchphrase "You're a harrrrd man, McGee", in response to a harsh or critical statement from Fibber. Throckmorton's wife is frequently mentioned, never heard, and was dropped when Peary moved on to his own show. However, the wife of Homer Gildersleeve (again played by Peary) was briefly heard from in one episode. Gildersleeve himself returned to the show for an episode (March 28, 1944) while Jim Jordan was ill; Gildersleeve and his nephew Leroy wanted to visit again while between trains.
- Silly Watson (Hugh Studebaker) – a bumpkin handyman with a propensity for mispronunciation. Left the show in 1939 when production and most of the cast moved to California and Studebaker remained in Chicago.
- The Old-Timer (Bill Thompson) – a hard-of-hearing senior citizen. For no apparent reason, he refers to Fibber as "Johnny" and Molly as "Daughter". Fibber's jokes often remind him of a story of his own, prefacing each one by saying, "That's pretty good, Johnny... but that ain't the way I heer'd it!" A recurring joke is that he refuses to disclose his real name; he uses various aliases, and his "real name" is "revealed" more than once, one time as Rupert Blasingaime and another as Alderton P. Bagshaw. The Old-Timer's girlfriend is named Bessie, and she usually refers to him as "O.T." In the December 10, 1940 episode "Mailing Christmas Packages", his sister refers to him as "Roy".
- Teeny, also known as "Little Girl" and "Sis" (Marian Jordan) – a precocious youngster who frequently tried to cadge loose change from Fibber (often in cahoots with her rarely heard best friend Willie Toops). She often ended her sentences with "I betcha!", and when someone mentioned food, or a word that sounded like a food, she usually responded "I'm hungry." Teeny was also known to lose track of her own conversations. When Fibber showed interest in what she was saying, she would forget all about it, and her conversation would switch from telling to asking. After Fibber repeated everything she had been telling him, Teeny would reply "I know!" or "I know it!" in a condescending way. Her appearances were sometimes foreshadowed by Molly excusing herself to the kitchen or to have a nap. Fibber would wistfully compliment her, saying, "Ah, there goes a good kid", upon which the doorbell would ring and Teeny would appear, usually greeting Fibber with "Hi, mister!" On rare occasions Molly and Teeny would interact. During the 1944 season's episode titled "Aunt Sarah's Picture", Fibber asks Teeny what her real name is. Teeny responded, "When I was a little baby my daddy called me Martini and then they just started calling me Teeny I guess". Fibber responds, "Why did your daddy call you Martini when you were a baby?", to which Teeny replied, "He said I was never dry enough to suit him". In the December 21, 1948 broadcast Fibber learns that her real name is "Elizabeth" from a Christmas card she had sent him, and in the episode "Fibber Gets Stuck in Fresh Pavement", she reveals her last name is Widdicombe. She was perpetually a child, and her permanent youth was only mentioned once; Fibber asked her how old she was, to which she responded, "six". Then he asked how long she had been coming over to visit him and Molly. "Nine years", she answered. Then, after a pause, she asked, "Ain't it a wonderful world, mister?"
- Mayor Homer La Trivia (Gale Gordon) – the mayor of Wistful Vista. In later episodes Fibber occasionally addresses the mayor as "Homer" and in one episode, Fifi Tremaine's pet name for the mayor is "Chuckie". He was simply known as "La Trivia" or "Coast Guardsman La Trivia" while in the US Coast Guard during World War II.
- Foggy Williams (Gordon) – local weatherman and next-door neighbor who tells fanciful stories, lets Fibber borrow his tools, and takes credit or blame for the present weather conditions. He is known for his extensive use of tentative language and usually exits with the line "Good day... probably."
- Dr. George Gamble (Arthur Q. Bryan) – a local physician and surgeon with whom Fibber had a long-standing rivalry and friendship. The two often come up with creative insults for each other's excessive weight. Gale Gordon played the part of the town doctor in several episodes before Bryan joined the cast; Bryan's character was originally referred to as J. Ramsey Gamble (on April 20, 1943) but when Bryan went before the microphone the character was renamed George Gamble.
- Ole Swenson (Richard LeGrand, who also played Mr. Peavey on The Great Gildersleeve) – a Swedish-born janitor at the Elks Club, often complaining that he was "joost donatin' my time!" His wife's name is Helga, and their children include Kristina, Sven, Lars, and Ole.
- Mrs. Abigail Uppington (Isabel Randolph) – a snooty society matron whose pretensions Fibber delighted in deflating. Fibber often addressed her as "Uppy". In the episode "Fibber Hires A Surveyor" (March 26, 1940) it is revealed that she is having a romantic relationship with orchestra leader Billy Mills, and in the episode "Gildersleeve's Diary" (October 22, 1940), she has a romantic past with Gildersleeve. She also has a relationship with Horatio K. Boomer in a few episodes, and the McGees assume he is using her for her money. In several episodes, there are references to the fact that Mrs. Uppington wasn't always rich. In the episode "Black Market Meat" (April 27, 1943) she lets slip that she's familiar with a local pawnshop; and in the episode "The Circus Comes to Town" (May 28, 1940), it is revealed that she met the wealthy Mr. Uppington when she was a circus bareback rider known as Mademoiselle Tootsie Latour. Her horse got scared during a trick, and she accidentally did a double back flip into Mr. Uppington's lap, and he proposed on the spot.
- Mrs. Millicent Carstairs (Bea Benaderet) – another of Wistful Vista's high society matrons, known to Fibber as "Carsty". Like Mrs. Uppington, Mrs. Carstairs doesn't come from a wealthy lineage. In "Fibber Thinks He's the Governor's Pal" (December 11, 1945), she lets slip that before she met Mr. Carstairs she was a blackjack dealer in a gambling joint.
- Wallace Wimple (Thompson) – Wimple was a soft-spoken man in the Caspar Milquetoast vein. He would enter the episode uttering his mush-mouth catchphrase, "Hello, folks!" Wimple might recite a verse he'd written but more often would recount the latest incident in his ongoing battle with the unheard Sweetie-Face, his massive and abusive "big old wife," whose given name was Cornelia. "Wimp", as Fibber called him, often reported provoking an overreaction from Sweetie-Face, followed by his attempt at revenge in a way that could be prankish, painful, or in some stories potentially fatal. One day (March 9, 1948) when he asked Sweetie-Face what she was doing, Wallace said she told him she was "practicing her weight-lifting". Wallace said he told Sweetie-Face, "My goodness, you do that every time you get up out of a chair." “Uh-oh," fretted Molly. "And then when I regained consciousness," continued Wimple, "she'd left the room." With a typically evil chuckle, Wallace said that he got even by bolting her 200-pound barbell to the floor, causing her to strain so hard the next time she lifted weights that she popped her girdle. Though the term "wimp" as used to describe a weak-willed person predated Fibber McGee and Molly, the Wimple character and Fibber's nickname for him may have contributed to a surge in popular use. Mr. Wimple had originated on Don McNeill's Breakfast Club in 1934 before he joined the Fibber McGee and Molly cast. Bill Thompson would later use Wallace Wimple's voice and some of his deceptively devious mannerisms for the animated cartoon character Droopy.
- Alice Darling (Shirley Mitchell) – a boy-crazy young aircraft-plant worker who boarded with the McGees during the war. The character remained in the scripts when the war ended, but when Bill Thompson and his multiple character voices returned in January 1946, there was no further need for the Alice character.
- Horatio K. Boomer (Thompson) – a friendly but slightly shady acquaintance with a W. C. Fields-like voice and delivery. His appearances typically included him rummaging through a pocket or bag or other container and listing the things inside, usually ending with "a check for a short beer".
- Nick Depopulis (Thompson) – a Greek-born restaurateur with a tendency toward verbal malapropisms. He normally refers to Fibber and Molly as "Fizzer" and "Kewpie".
- Milt Spilkt – the nephew of Kramer from Kramer's Drugstore.
- The Toops Family – Mort and Mabel Toops, and their son Willie, live in the McGees' neighborhood next door to Dr. Gamble. They are rarely heard on the show, but have occasional lines (for example, Mabel has several lines during "Fibber Cooks Dinner for Molly's Birthday" (October 23, 1951), Mort has some lines in "Halloween Party" (October 28, 1935), and Willie is heard in "Soapbox Derby Racer for Teeny" (April 24, 1951)). Willie Toops is most often mentioned in conjunction with Teeny, who sometimes refers to him as her boyfriend or future husband. The character of Beulah first appeared when she stopped at the McGees' on her way to her first day of work at the Toops' house. Mort was a regular on the Jordans' previous series Smackout, where Jim Jordan had voiced him.
- Myrt, also known as "Myrtle" – an almost-never-heard-from telephone operator (she makes a brief appearance in the June 22, 1943 episode) that Fibber is friends with. A typical Myrt sketch started with Fibber picking up the phone and demanding, "Operator, give me number 32Oooh, is that you, Myrt? How's every little thing, Myrt? What say, Myrt?" Commonly, this was followed with Fibber relaying what Myrt was telling him to Molly, usually news about Myrt's family, and always ending with a bad pun. Myrt made one brief on-air appearance on June 22, 1943, when she visited the McGees to wish them a good summer—the McGees did not recognize her in person.
- Fred Nitney – Fibber's old vaudeville partner from Starved Rock, Illinois. Another never-heard character, until episode 715, which aired January 6, 1953. They meet and chat briefly at the train station. Fred Nitney was played by Bob Sweeney, who would himself assume the Fibber McGee role in the 1959 TV series. Nitney had a daughter who served in the WACs' recruiting office during World War II, and who on October 12, 1943 set Fibber straight on his inability to pull strings to try to give unearned military commissions.
- Aunt Sarah – Molly's rich aunt, a character never heard in person, who always sends useless gifts for Christmas.
- Fifi Tremaine – another never-heard-from character, Fifi was an actress and was courted by both Doc Gamble and Mayor La Trivia, and Fibber enjoyed pitting the two against each other in their competition for Fifi's affections.
- Herbert Appel – a stock boy at the hardware store, his character is distinguished by his odd speech patterns. By putting non-standard emphasis on syllables and sounds, his sentences can be confusing and/or humorous (what would now be considered mondegreen). For example, "I had to get up at eight o'clock" is heard by Fibber and Molly as "I had to get a potato clock", "I got up too early" comes out as "I got up twirly", and his own name sounds like "Herber Tapple" (in "Fibber Puts Up Christmas Lights", December 20, 1949).
- Beulah – the McGees' black maid and possibly the series' most unusual character. Unlike the situation on The Jack Benny Program, where black actor Eddie Anderson played "Rochester", Beulah was voiced by a white male, Marlin Hurt. Hurt would not call attention to himself during the broadcast, appearing to be an anonymous staff member near the microphone, with his back to the studio audience. When it was time for the character's usual opening line, Hurt would suddenly turn to the audience and drawl in dialect, "Somebody bawl fo' Beulah?" Hurt's surprise introduction provoked stunned, screeching laughter among the live studio audience members; many of them, seeing the show performed for the first time in person, did not know that the actor voicing Beulah was neither black nor female. Beulah's other catchphrase, typically delivered after a fit of laughter over a Fibber gag, was, "Love that man!" Hurt had created the Beulah character independently and had portrayed her occasionally on other shows prior to his joining the Fibber McGee and Molly cast. Beulah was respected by the characters as a first-class cook. She had a fierce side, as well. When Fibber shares his suspicions that a neighbor might have sold his loyalty to Adolf Hitler (April 18, 1944), she says that if Fibber is right, and if the neighbor tries any espionage around her, she'll "Gestapo him [the alleged spy] across the head with a frying pan."
- Lena – the McGees' second maid during the series, she replaced Beulah after the character was spun off into her own show. Like Beulah, Lena was played by a male actor, Gene Carroll.
- Uncle Dennis (Ransom Sherman) – Molly's hard-drinking uncle, Dennis Driscoll, who was the subject of a running gag (see below) and was generally never heard. He did appear in a few episodes in 1943–44, including "Renting Spare Room" (October 5, 1943), "Fibber Makes His Own Chili Sauce" (November 9, 1943), and "Dinner Out to Celebrate" (January 25, 1944). The Irish-brogued character was always in hopes of "makin'acouplabucks" (spoken as a single word).
- Sigmund "Sig" Wellington (Sherman) – the manager of the Bijou Theater.

=== As themselves ===
- Billy Mills – wisecracking leader of Billy Mills and the Orchestra, who led the show's ensemble through musical numbers in each episode. In addition to standards and popular tunes, Mills occasionally showcased his own original compositions, including "I'm in Love with the Sound Effects Man" (in the episode "Amusement Park" (June 17, 1941) and later covered by Spike Jones), and "The Cocky Cuckoo" (in the episode "Businessmen's Symphony", (06/12/51)). Mills also was the composer of the show's theme song, "Wing to Wing", that was used from 1940 until the series' end.
- Rico Marcelli – the original bandleader prior to Mills's arrival. Unlike Mills, Marcelli had no non-musical role in the series.
- Harlow Wilcox – announcer for the series, whom Fibber regularly interrupted during commercial breaks, and could turn any conversation towards the topic of whichever product was sponsoring the show at the time.

== After the program aired and rehearsal ==
The radio show was run on a tight schedule, considered to be one of the best organized broadcasts on the networks. Perhaps because or despite his having a good memory, Jim Jordan insisted that everyone affiliated with the program must take a two-day rest, following the Tuesday broadcast. Nothing was done about the following Tuesday's show until Friday morning, when Jim and Marian Jordan got together with writer Don Quinn and agency producer Cecil Underwood to talk through the following weeks' script. They worked in a business office because they were convinced a businesslike and efficient atmosphere helped them get the work done in two hours. By Saturday morning, Quinn had the first draft of the script ready, which "Fibber" read, and then Quinn revised into the final, working script. He did this Sunday night, working all night and finishing Monday morning, when the cast would gather at NBC's Hollywood studios and rehearse for two hours. After this, Quinn made any final changes. Tuesday morning the entire cast (including Billy Mills's orchestra) would run through the script four times, ending with a complete run-through at 3 pm. At 5:30 p.m. (Pacific time), the show went on the air. This pattern of preparation never varied by much more than an hour from week-to-week.

== Show format ==
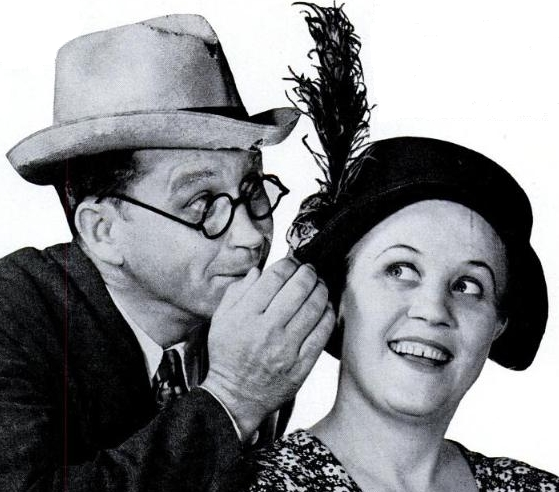
A character shot of Fibber and Molly, 1937.

For most of the show's history, the usual order of the show was the introduction followed by a Johnson Wax plug by Harlow then his introduction to the first part of the script (usually 11 minutes). Billy Mills usually followed with an instrumental (or accompanied by Martha Tilton in 1941). The musical interlude would segue into the second part of the script, followed by a performance (by the vocal group, the Kings Men – occasionally featuring a solo by leader Ken Darby). The final act would then begin, with the last line usually being the lesson learned that day. A final commercial, then Billy Mills's theme song to fade. Later, Harlow would meet up and visit with the McGees, and work in a Johnson Wax commercial, sometimes assisted by Fibber and Molly.

== Ratings ==
Month	Rating (% listeners)
January 1936	6.6
January 1937	13.0
January 1938	14.8
January 1939	16.7
January 1940	30.8
January 1941	27.4
January 1942	33.3
January 1943	37.7
January 1944	31.9
January 1945	30.8
January 1946	30.8
January 1947	30.2
January 1948	27.7
January 1949	26.9
January 1950	16.9
January 1951	13.7
January 1952	10.7
January 1953	11.9

== Running gags ==
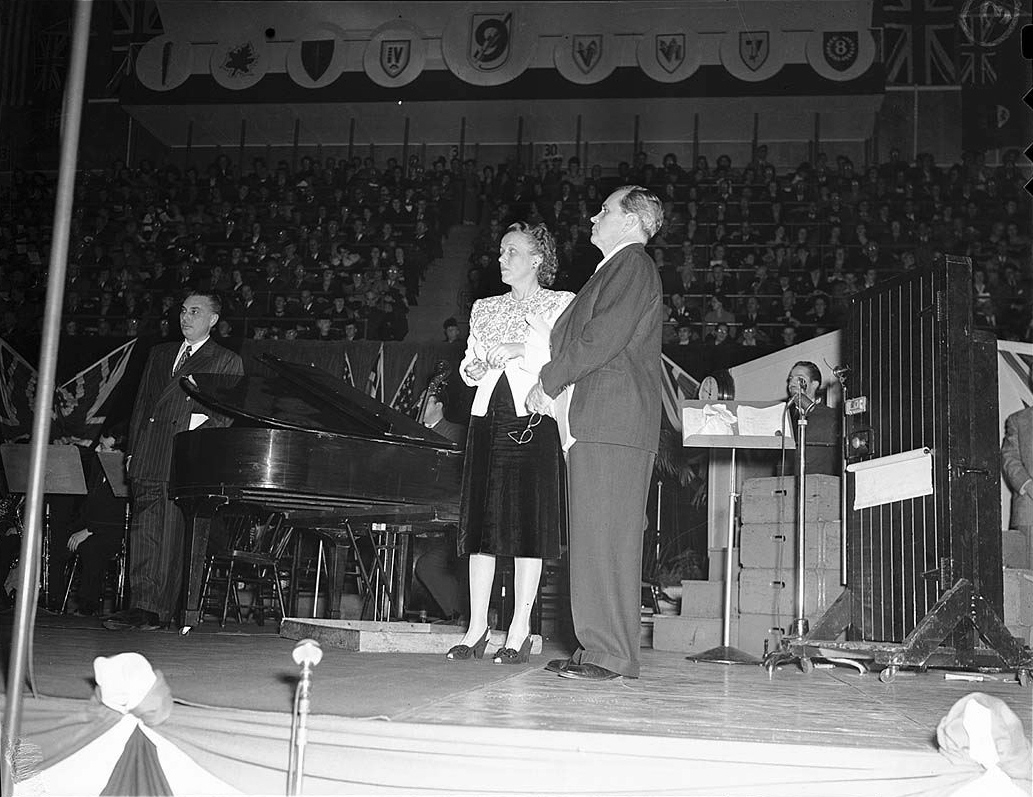
Jim and Marian Jordan as Fibber McGee and Molly, at a Victory Bond rally at Maple Leaf Gardens in Toronto in 1945. Note sound effects men and equipment at right.

Much of the show's humor relied on recurring gags, unseen regulars and well-timed punch lines. The 30-minute show usually opened with the audience in full laughter as announcer Harlow Wilcox called out "The Johnson Wax Program with Fibber McGee and Molly!" To McGee's periodic bad jokes Molly often answered "T'ain't funny, McGee!", which became a familiar catchphrase during the 1940s. Molly's Uncle Dennis, who lives with the couple, is apparently a dedicated alcoholic and a punch line for many Fibber jokes; at times he was the main subject of some shows in which he "disappeared".

Fibber's lack of a regular job led to numerous references and jokes: Mayor La Trivia often offered McGee mundane jobs at City Hall using flowery descriptions such as "looking in on the higher-ups at City Hall" (a window-cleaning job). Another was for Fibber to work in disguise for days at a time as the Wistful Vista Santa Claus.

"Fibber" McGee is overly proud of past misdeeds, sometimes recalling nicknames acquired; many involved a bad pun. An accusation of being a glib talker became "Ad Glib McGee". And making expressions with his eyes led to the nickname "Eyes-a-muggin' McGee" (a play on the popular Stuff Smith swing tune "I'se A-muggin'"). The opening involved much boastful alliteration.

The couple's Peoria schoolmate (and Molly's earlier boyfriend) Otis Cadwallader is the subject of a longstanding one-sided grudge by Fibber. The "corner of 14th and Oak" in downtown Wistful Vista was routinely given as a location for various homes, places of business and government buildings throughout the show's run. Whenever someone asks the time it is always half-past.

McGee has a reputation for telling tall tales, and there are occasional jokes linking this propensity to his name "Fibber". In the episode "Fibber Changes His Name" (March 25, 1941), he goes so far as to claim that "Fibber" is his actual given name and not just a nickname. According to McGee, "I was named after my fourth cousin, Walpole J. Fimmer ... but the minister who christened me had a cold in his head."

=== The Hall Closet ===
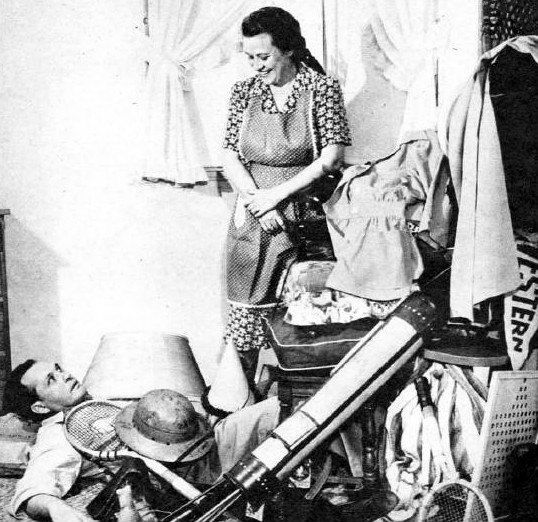
Photo of "the Closet"; the actual on-the-air sound was done by sound effects men.

None of the show's other running gags was as memorable or enduring as the overstuffed hall closet. The gag involved McGee's frequently opening a cacophonous closet, with the bric-a-brac it contained clattering down and out and, often enough, over McGee's or Molly's heads. "I gotta get that closet cleaned out one of these days" was the usual McGee observation once the racket subsided. Naturally, "one of these days" almost never arrived. A good thing, too: in one famous instance, when a burglar (played by Bob Bruce) tied up McGee, McGee informed him cannily that the family's silver was "right through that door, bud... just yank it open, bud!" Naturally, the burglar took the bait and naturally, he was buried in the inevitable avalanche, long enough for the police to apprehend him.

This gag appears to have begun with the March 5, 1940, show, "Cleaning the Closet". Molly opens the closet looking for the dictionary and is promptly buried in Fibber's "stuff" ("arranged in there just the way I want it"). Cleaning out the closet becomes the show's plot, inventorying much of the contents along the way: a photo album, a rusty horseshoe, a ten-foot pole. After repacking the closet, Fibber realizes the dictionary has been put away too—and he opens the closet again, causing an avalanche. This episode also features a cameo by Gracie Allen, running for president on the Surprise Party ticket. Toward the end of the September 30, 1941 show, "Back from Vacation; Gildy Says Goodbye", next-door nemesis Gildersleeve—who has moved to Summerfield to finish raising his orphaned niece and nephew (and already begun his successful spin-off show The Great Gildersleeve)—has come back to Wistful Vista to wind up his affairs there. In a farewell to the show that made him famous, Gildersleeve opens the closet to be buried in the usual avalanche.

On at least one occasion, the gag is flipped, and the closet is silent: in "Man's Untapped Energies" (broadcast March 11, 1947), visiting Dr. Gamble makes to leave. Molly warns, "No, Doctor, not through that door, that's the hall closet!" As the audience chuckles slightly in anticipation, Fibber explains: "Oh, I forgot to tell you, Molly, I straightened out the hall closet this morning!" This was certainly not the end of the gag, though, as the closet soon became cluttered once again, leading to many more disasters.

Like many such trademarks, the clattering closet began as a one-time stunt, but "the closet" was developed carefully, not being overused (it rarely appeared in more than two consecutive installments, though it never disappeared for the same length, either, at the height of its identification, and it rarely collapsed at exactly the same time from show to show), and it became the best-known running sound gag in American radio's classic period. Jack Benny's basement vault alarm ran a distant second. Both of these classic sound effects were performed by Ed Ludes and Virgil Rhymer, the Hollywood-based NBC staff sound effects creators. Exactly what tumbled out of McGee's closet each time was never clear (except to these sound-effects men), but what signaled the end of the avalanche was always the same sound: a clear, tiny, household hand bell and McGee's inevitable post-collapse lament. "Fibber McGee's closet" entered the American vernacular as a catchphrase synonymous with household clutter.

== Sponsors ==
Each episode also featured an appearance by announcer Harlow Wilcox, whose job it was to weave the second ad for the sponsor into the plot without having to break the show for a real commercial. Wilcox's introductory pitch lines were usually met with groans or humorously sarcastic lines by Fibber. During the many years that the show was sponsored by Johnson Wax, Fibber nicknamed Wilcox "Waxy", due to Wilcox's constant praises of their various products, and during the years the show was sponsored by Pet Milk, Fibber changed the nickname to "Milky". In a style not unusual for the classic radio years, the show was typically introduced as, "The Johnson Wax Program, with Fibber McGee and Molly". Johnson Wax sponsored the show through 1950; Pet Milk through 1952; and, until the show's final half-hour episode in mid-1953, Reynolds Aluminum. Fibber sometimes referred to Harlow as "Harpo".

The show also used two musical numbers per episode to break the comedy routines into sections. For most of the show's run, there would be one vocal number by The King's Men (a vocal quartet: Ken Darby, Rad Robinson, Jon Dodson and Bud Linn), and an instrumental by The Billy Mills Orchestra. For a short time in the early 1940s, Martha Tilton would sing what was formerly the instrumental.

Before and during America's involvement in World War II, references to or about the war and the members of the Axis powers were commonplace on the show. Just after the Japanese attacked Pearl Harbor in December 1941, Jim Jordan, out of character, soberly ended the Fibber McGee show by inviting the studio audience to sing "America". During the show of December 9, the Mayor is seeking a globe in order to keep up with current events. Molly asks him, "Do you want one with Japan on it?" The mayor says, "Why, of course." "Then you better get one quick," Molly says, receiving thunderous applause from the studio audience.

Also commonplace were calls to action to buy war bonds (both through announcements and subtle references written into the script), and condemnation of food and supply hoarding. On the other hand, the Jordans gladly cooperated in turning the show over to a half-hour devoted entirely to patriotic music on the day of the D-Day invasion in 1944, with the couple speaking only at the opening and the closing of the broadcast. This show remains available to collectors amidst many a Fibber McGee and Molly packaging.

When the shows were broadcast overseas by the Armed Forces Radio Service (AFRS), all three commercials were eliminated from the program. Harlow Wilcox's middle ad was edited out, and the two advertisements at the beginning and end of the show were replaced by musical numbers, so that the show on AFRS would have two numbers by Billy Mills and the Orchestra, and two by The King's Men.

The Jordans were experts at transforming the ethnic humor of vaudeville into more rounded comic characters, no doubt due in part to the affection felt for the famous supporting cast members who voiced these roles, including Bill Thompson (as the Old Timer and Wimple), Harold Peary (as Gildersleeve), Gale Gordon (as La Trivia), Arthur Q. Bryan (as Dr. Gamble; Bryan also voiced Elmer Fudd for the Warner Brothers Looney Tunes cartoons, which also borrowed lines from Fibber McGee and Molly from time to time), Isabel Randolph (as Mrs. Uppington), Marlin Hurt (a white male who played in dialect the McGee's maid, Beulah), and others. They were also expert at their own running gags and catchphrases, many of which entered the American vernacular: "That ain't the way I heeard it!"; "'T'ain't funny, McGee!" and "Heavenly days!" were the three best known.

== Spin-offs ==
Fibber McGee and Molly spun two supporting characters off into their own shows. By far the most successful and popular was Harold Peary's Gildersleeve, spun into The Great Gildersleeve in 1941. This show introduced single parenthood of a sort to creative broadcasting: the pompous, previously married Gildersleeve now moved to Summerfield, became single (although the missing wife was never explained), and raised his orphaned, spirited niece and nephew, while dividing his time between running his manufacturing business and (eventually) becoming the town water commissioner. In one episode, the McGees arrived in Summerfield for a visit with their old neighbor with hilarious results: McGee inadvertently learns Gildersleeve is engaged, and he practically needs to be chloroformed to perpetuate the secret a little longer.

Peary returned the favor in a memorable 1944 Fibber McGee & Molly episode in which neither of the title characters appeared: Jim Jordan was recovering from a bout of pneumonia (this would be written into the show the following week, when the Jordans returned), and the story line involved Gildersleeve and nephew Leroy hoping to visit the McGees at home during a train layover in Wistful Vista, but finding Fibber and Molly not at home. At the end of the episode, Gildersleeve discovers the couple had left in a hurry that morning when they received Gildy's letter saying he would be stopping over in Wistful Vista.

Marlin Hurt's Beulah was also spun off, leading to both a radio and television show that would eventually star Hattie McDaniel and Ethel Waters.

Jim and Marian Jordan themselves occasionally appeared on other programs, away from their Fibber and Molly characters. One memorable episode of Suspense ("Backseat Driver", February 3, 1949) cast the Jordans as victims of a car-jacking; Jim Jordan's tense, interior monologues were especially dramatic.

== Films ==
The Jordans portrayed their characters in four films. In the early years of the radio show, they were supporting characters in the 1937 Paramount film This Way Please, starring Charles "Buddy" Rogers and Betty Grable. Once the show hit its stride, they had leading roles in the RKO Radio Pictures films Look Who's Laughing (1941), Here We Go Again (1942), and Heavenly Days (1944).

The first two RKO films are generally considered the best, as they co-star fellow radio stars Edgar Bergen and Charlie McCarthy. Harold Peary also appears in both as Gildersleeve, with Arthur Q. Bryan, Bill Thompson, Harlow Wilcox, Gale Gordon, and Isabel Randolph appearing in both their show roles and as other characters. Bill Thompson in Look Who's Laughing played two parts: The pushy sales-man, and the man who shouted "It's Hillary Horton". Gale Gordon played Otis Cadwalader, Molly's ex-boyfriend in Here We Go Again. Arthur Q. Bryan played the Mayor's aide in Look Who's Laughing. The Jordans' participation in Look Who's Laughing was set up in the Fibber McGee & Molly episode "Amusement Park" (June 17, 1941), in which Gale Gordon played an RKO pictures representative who followed the McGees around the amusement park and chose the McGees as a representative American couple to star in a movie with Edgar Bergen and Charlie McCarthy. The day before the film's real-life premiere in San Francisco, the movie had its fictional opening in Wistful Vista during that week's radio episode, and Bergen and McCarthy made a guest appearance ("Premiere of Look Who's Laughing" (November 11, 1941)).

Look Who's Laughing has been released on VHS and DVD as part of the Lucille Ball RKO Collection. Here We Go Again has been released on VHS and was released on DVD on January 14, 2014, through Warner Archives. Heavenly Days was also included in the January 2014 DVD release of Here We Go Again as part of a "double feature" DVD. Look Who's Laughing, Here We Go Again and Heavenly Days have been featured on Turner Classic Movies.

In addition to the feature films, the McGees appeared in character in the 1945 film The All-Star Bond Rally, a promotional film for war bonds. The characters appear as bookends to the film, attending a stage presentation hosted by Bob Hope, who knows and recognizes them. The All-Star Bond Rally lapsed into the public domain in 1973 and is widely available.

Other films featured the McGees' neighbors. The first film was called Comin' Round the Mountain (1940) and featured the McGees' neighbors The Old-Timer (played by Bill Thompson) and Gildersleeve, as the mayor of the town. Gildersleeve's character was in many other films before The Great Gildersleeve show and movies. Abigail Uppington is in the film County Fair along with Harold Peary, and his future radio show co-star Shirley Mitchell (who also played Leila Ransom in The Great Gildersleeve); the Uppington character also appeared in Barnyard Follies.

== Changes ==
NBC was already expecting Fibber McGee and Molly to someday become a television series. The network published a trade ad in 1944, while commercial television was still in its early stage and not yet available outside of a very few cities, with the headline "Imagine Fibber McGee and Molly on TELEVISION, brought to you by NBC." NBC, taking stock of its most valuable broadcast properties and anticipating the lucrative new field of television, regarded Fibber McGee and Molly as being essential to its future plans. In 1948 the network offered to buy the franchise outright from its owners: Jim Jordan, Marian Jordan, and Don Quinn. The owners agreed to the buyout, and Fibber McGee and Molly officially became the property of NBC.

The network had high hopes of converting the radio show to television. These hopes were not shared by the Jordans, who preferred to remain in radio. "They were trying to push us into TV, and we were reluctant," Jim Jordan told an interviewer many years later. "Our friends advised us, 'Don't do it until you need to. You have this value in radio--milk it dry.'" The Jordans grudgingly agreed to film a TV pilot when their longtime sponsor S. C. Johnson requested it, but the video adaptation was abandoned. The sponsor, anxious to devote more advertising dollars to television, parted company with Fibber McGee and Molly amicably. Pet Milk took over the sponsorship of the radio show in 1950 (for two years), followed by Reynolds Aluminum, which subsidized the show until the end of the primetime run on June 30, 1953.

NBC wanted to keep its property going, so the show was retooled as a daily 15-minute show, aired Monday through Friday twice a day (afternoons and evenings). The retooling had new economies taking their toll on the original format. The studio audience was dispensed with, leaving the Jordans to record their dialogue in a quiet studio. All five of each week's episodes were recorded in a single session. (This proved a special boon to Marian Jordan, who found the new surroundings more comfortable and convenient.) The musical sections of the half-hour format were removed, leaving a quarter-hour of continuous comedy. Although announcer Harlow Wilcox and character comedian Gale Gordon did not participate in the daily shows, Bill Thompson and Arthur Q. Bryan continued making appearances alongside the Jordans, along with familiar radio performers Virginia Gregg, Herb Vigran, Robert Easton, and Mary Jane Croft, among others. The new format began airing on October 5, 1953, and was successful; NBC Radio kept Fibber McGee and Molly in its weekday lineup through March 23, 1956. Both the Jordans and the writers took things easier toward the end of the run: beginning in September 1955, about five out of every 25 shows were repeats or condensed versions of old half-hour scripts.

NBC had launched an ambitious new format for its weekend programming in 1955: Monitor. This was designed especially to demonstrate the immediacy and importance of radio, with a mixture of news, sports, music, comedy, human interest, and special events running continuously throughout the weekend hours. In 1957 NBC, still valuing its Fibber McGee and Molly property, invited Jim and Marian Jordan to record new comedy routines for Monitor. These interludes, aired as Just Molly and Me, featured the Jordans (alone, with no supporting cast) in five-minute sketches written by Monitor staffer (and Bob and Ray writer) Tom Koch. Koch caught the spirit of the series beautifully, bringing back many of the familiar hallmarks of the half-hour series and cleverly fashioning new stories in five-part serial form. A 1959 strip, "Autumn Drive," has Fibber and Molly planning to look at the fall foliage: episode one has the couple enthusing about the trip; episode two has McGee explaining foliage to Teeny; episode three has the McGees loading their car for any contingency; episode four has them on the road; and episode five has them reviewing the photographs they took on the tour. Radio historian Gerald S. Nachman has written that the Jordans anticipated renewing their contract with NBC for another three years when Marian's battle against ovarian cancer ended with her death in 1961.

== Television ==
After the last of the Just Molly and Me radio shorts ceased production, there were two attempts at getting the McGees onto television. Only one came to fruition. The Fibber McGee and Molly TV series began production on March 15, 1959, for broadcast beginning in September 1959. Initial press releases stated that Jim Jordan Jr. would be the director, but he became a consultant, along with the radio show's original creator, Don Quinn.

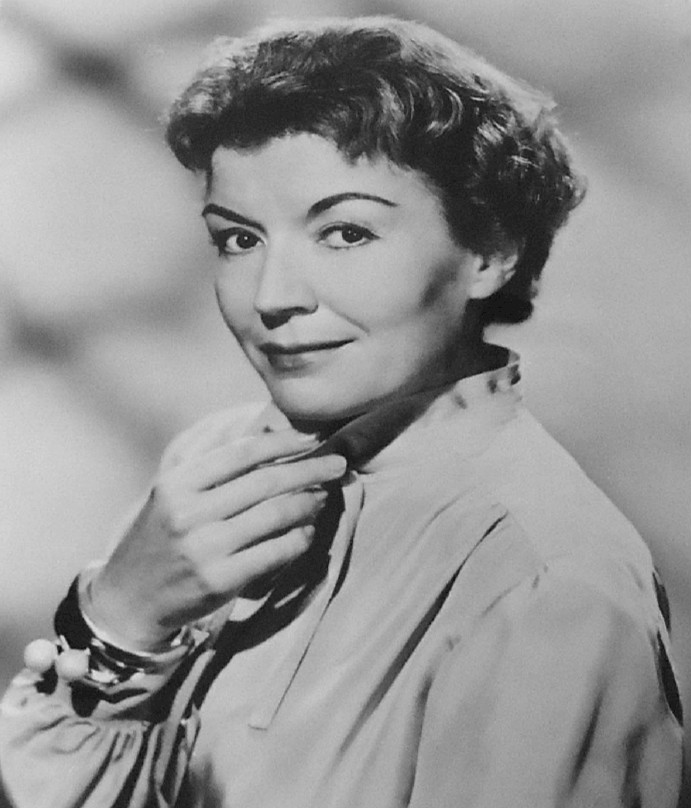
Cathy Lewis as Molly McGee in 1959.

The TV version was produced by William Asher for NBC (and co-sponsored by Singer Corporation and Standard Brands). Neither of the Jordans, nor Phil Leslie (the head writer by the end of the radio series), took part in the series. The decision was made to recast both roles, with younger actors Bob Sweeney and Cathy Lewis as Fibber and Molly respectively; Lewis had previously played Jane Stacy, a very similar straight-woman character, on the radio version of My Friend Irma. Bill Davenport served as head writer for this series. The only radio alumnus to appear as a regular cast member was Harold Peary, who took the role of Mayor La Trivia.

The TV version's main asset was character comic Bob Sweeney, who caught the spirit and cadence of Jim Jordan's "Fibber" delivery, alternating between cheerful, boastful, and fretful. Veteran screen actor Addison Richards made a good foil as Doc Gamble. The series had solid comedy situations, and might have succeeded as a typical domestic comedy if the characters had been named anything but Fibber and Molly, but it could not replicate the flavor and humor of the original Fibber McGee and Molly. The TV series did not survive its first season, ending its run in January 1960. The pilot episode and at least three episodes of the television series have lapsed into the public domain.

The second TV venture only got as far as the planning stages. NBC approached Jay Ward, producer of the Rocky and Bullwinkle TV cartoons, to film a series of half-hour Fibber McGee and Molly cartoons. This was probably an attempt by NBC to reactivate its property to compete with ABC's then-new cartoon sitcom The Flintstones. Ward declined, and NBC's Fibber McGee and Molly franchise finally came to an end.

== Jim Jordan later in life ==
In the 1970s, Jim Jordan briefly returned to acting. An episode of NBC's Chico and the Man featured a surprise appearance by Jordan as a friendly neighborhood mechanic. Jordan also lent his voice to Disney's animated film, The Rescuers (1977) and reprised his role as Fibber McGee (complete with the closet gag) in an advertisement for AARP. He died in 1988—a year before Fibber McGee and Molly was inducted into the Radio Hall of Fame.

Jim Jordan married Gretchen Stewart (the widow of Yogi Yorgesson) after Marian's death. Gretchen and the Jordan children donated the manuscripts of Smackout and Fibber McGee and Molly to Chicago's Museum of Broadcast Communications after his death in 1988. Perhaps fittingly for his longtime radio alter ego, Jordan died on April Fool's Day.

The show has a star on the Hollywood Walk of Fame next to the NBC studios where the show was performed. The S.C. Johnson Company has preserved more than 700 shows it sponsored for fifteen years.
