= Marian Driscoll Jordan =

American actress (1898–1961)

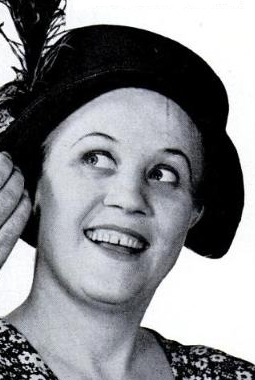
- Jordan in 1937
- Born: Marian Irene Driscoll; April 15, 1898; Peoria, Illinois, U.S.
- Died: April 7, 1961 (aged 62); Encino, California, U.S.
- Resting place: Holy Cross Cemetery; Culver City, California
- Occupations: Actress, radio personality
- Years active: 1924–1961
- Notable work: Fibber McGee and Molly
- Spouse: Jim Jordan (m. 1918)
- Children: 2

Marian Irene Driscoll Jordan (April 15, 1898 – April 7, 1961) was an American actress and radio personality. She was most remembered for portraying the role of Molly McGee, the patient, common sense, honey-natured wife of Fibber McGee on the NBC radio series Fibber McGee and Molly from 1935 to 1959. She starred on this series opposite her real-life husband Jim Jordan.

== Early life and marriage ==
Jordan was born Marian Irene Driscoll on April 15, 1898, in Peoria, Illinois. She was the twelfth of thirteen children born to Daniel P. Driscoll, (1858–1916) and Anna Driscoll (née Carroll), (1858–1928). Driscoll's paternal great-grandfather, Michael Driscoll, Sr. (1793–1849), emigrated with his wife and children from his hometown of Baltimore, County Cork, Ireland in 1836 to the Boston area and then to Bureau County, Illinois in 1848.

As a teenager and young adult, Driscoll gave music lessons and sang in choir at the church which she attended. While at choir practice one day, she met a member of the choir named James Edward "Jim" Jordan. The two were married on August 31, 1918. They had two children together; a son and a daughter. The couple went on to have a long career in show business.

Their life as newlyweds started humbly. Marian became a piano teacher and Jim a mailman. Jim enlisted in the army and was eventually stationed in France during World War I. He contracted a case of influenza during the 1918 flu pandemic but survived. After the war ended, Jim stayed in Europe to do Vaudeville performances for wounded soldiers.

== Radio ==
=== Early radio career ===
Jordan was first heard on radio with her husband Jim in 1924 after a bet that Jim made with his brother. The couple's performance was a success. They began performing at WIBO, a radio station in Chicago where they earned $10 a week.

In 1927, Marian and Jim began their second radio show, The Smith Family which aired on WENR radio in Chicago. The show was a great boost to their career, ending in 1930.

=== Collaboration with Don Quinn and Smackout ===
In 1931, while in Chicago, the Jordans met cartoonist Don Quinn. The three of them created the radio comedy Smackout. The series starred Marian as a gossipy green-grocer. Jim played the manager of the grocery store. Marian was known for her catchphrase, "He was smack out of everything, 'cept hot air."

The show, for which Don Quinn was head writer, was the Jordans' first nationwide success. It was also one of the first situation comedies (sitcoms).

Smackout ended in 1935 after its sponsorship was taken over by the Johnson Wax Company. The Jordans and Don Quinn collaborated on the creation of a new show for Johnson Wax, Fibber McGee and Molly.

=== Fibber McGee years ===
On April 16, 1935, Marian Jordan, her husband Jim, and writer Don Quinn, began broadcasting Fibber McGee and Molly, on the NBC Blue Network Chicago radio affiliate WMAQ. The series was a big hit. Marian played the role of Molly McGee, the patient and intelligent wife who supports husband Fibber McGee through various get rich quick schemes and misadventures.

In 1938, the show and Jordan would both suffer major changes. During this time, Marian was drinking excessively. She entered a rehabilitation center in suburban Chicago and tried to get sober. The Jordan children were in high school and college. "Molly" was written out of the radio show, and the program was renamed Fibber McGee and Company. Those who knew Marian doubted that she would ever return to radio, especially after the show moved from Chicago to Los Angeles in 1939. However, Marian astonished everyone by travelling alone from Joliet, Illinois to Pasadena, California in March 1939. She was able to return to the character of "Molly," and some listeners considered her better than before.

The show received high ratings, from season three in 1938 until the end of its run. It also gave birth to a spin-off. In 1941, a recurring character, Throckmorton P. Gildersleeve, (played by Harold Peary), began a new show called The Great Gildersleeve. The radio and television series Beulah was also a spin-off of Fibber McGee and Molly.

Marian Jordan's health began to deteriorate in the 1950s. This was the beginning of the end both for the show and for Jordan. The program officially ended in 1956 but the Jordans continued their roles as Fibber McGee and Molly in short skits on the NBC radio program Monitor until October 2, 1959, when her poor health made her unable to continue. By the time Fibber McGee and Molly was adapted for television, Marian was too ill to reprise her role, and Cathy Lewis took her place, opposite Bob Sweeney as Fibber. Lewis's darker take on the character was a factor in the television series' cancellation after only a half-season.

=== Other works ===
In the 1920s, Jordan did a radio show in Chicago entitled Luke and Mirandy. She played the role of Mirandy with her husband Jim as Luke. It was a farm-report program in which Luke told tall tales and face-saving lies for comedic effect.

Marian Jordan also appeared as Molly in six movies based on Fibber McGee and Molly.

== Personal life ==
Marian married Jim Jordan on August 31, 1918, in Peoria. They were married for almost 43 years until her death on April 7, 1961. They had two children: Kathryn Therese Jordan, and James Carroll "Jim" Jordan. She was a Roman Catholic.

== Illness and death ==
The deterioration of Marian's health began in 1938 during the run of Fibber McGee and Molly. She was an alcoholic and entered a rehabilitation center. She returned to radio in April, 1939.

In 1953, Jordan's health became progressively worse. She became exhausted and easily fatigued. A doctor suggested she take a long rest, but she refused, deciding instead to continue performing. The Fibber McGee and Molly program was then recorded from the Jordans' home in Encino. The music was pre-recorded, and the commercials were no longer part of the show, but her failing health eventually ended the Fibber McGee and Molly show in 1956.

In 1958, Marian was found to have an inoperable form of cancer.

Marian Jordan died at her home in Encino on April 7, 1961, of cancer. She and Jim Jordan are buried at the Holy Cross Cemetery in Culver City, California.

== Honors ==
Fibber McGee and Molly was inducted into the Radio Hall of Fame in 1989. Marian and Jim Jordan were inducted the same year.

Jordan also has a star for her contributions to radio on the Hollywood Walk of Fame at 1500 Vine Street.
