= Harold Peary =

American actor, comedian and singer (1908–1985)

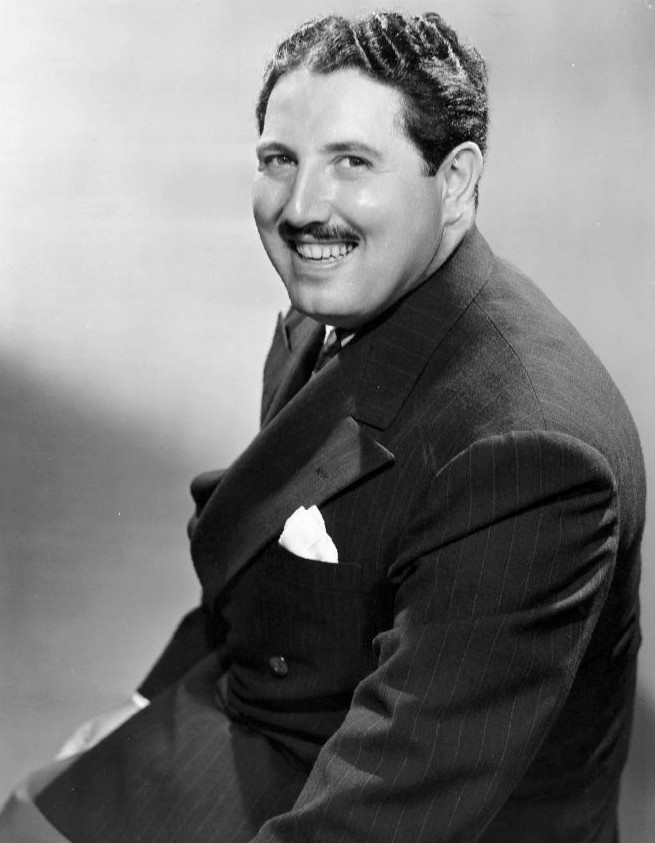
- Peary in 1952
- Born: Harrold José Pereira de Faria; July 25, 1908; San Leandro, California, U.S.
- Died: March 30, 1985 (aged 76); Torrance, California, U.S.
- Resting place: Remains scattered into the Pacific Ocean
- Occupations: Actor; Comedian; Singer
- Years active: 1923–1981
- Political party: Republican
- Spouse(s): Eleanor Virginia (Betty) Jourdaine (1929-1947) (divorced); Gloria Holliday (1947-1956) (divorced); Callie J. Lawson (1964-1977) (divorced)

Harold "Hal" Peary (born Harrold José Pereira de Faria; July 25, 1908 – March 30, 1985) was an American actor, comedian and singer in radio, films, television, and animation. His most memorable role was as Throckmorton P. Gildersleeve, which began as a supporting character on radio's Fibber McGee and Molly in 1938 before being spun off to star in a successful radio series The Great Gildersleeve, several films and other media adaptations.

== Early life ==
Born as José Pereira de Faria in San Leandro, California, to Portuguese parents, Harold Peary (pronounced Perry) began working in local radio as early as 1923, according to his own memory. He had his own show as a singer, The Spanish Serenader, in San Francisco. While in San Francisco, he and Eddie Firestone had several parts in Wheatenaville, a program broadcast on NBC's Pacific network beginning September 26, 1932. He then moved to Chicago, Illinois, in 1935.

== Gildersleeve ==
In Chicago, he became a regular on Fibber McGee and Molly, where he originated the colorful and arrogant Gildersleeve character as a McGee neighbor and nemesis in 1938. He also worked on the horror series Lights Out and other radio programs, but his success and popularity as Gildersleeve set the stage for the character's own program, which became the peak of his career.

Johnson Wax, which sponsored Fibber McGee & Molly, sponsored an audition recording for The Great Gildersleeve, and the Kraft Cheese Company signed on as the show's regular sponsor. Gildersleeve was transplanted from Wistful Vista to Summerfield with more than just a locale change—now a bachelor, and now the water commissioner instead of the owner of the Gildersleeve's Girlish Girdles company. With much of his pomposity and cantankerousness toned down, he was also newly domesticated and appointed guardian of his orphaned niece Marjorie and nephew Leroy. Implicitly well-off though by no means wealthy, Gildersleeve was depicted winding up his lingerie-making company and taking up a new life as Summerfield's water commissioner.

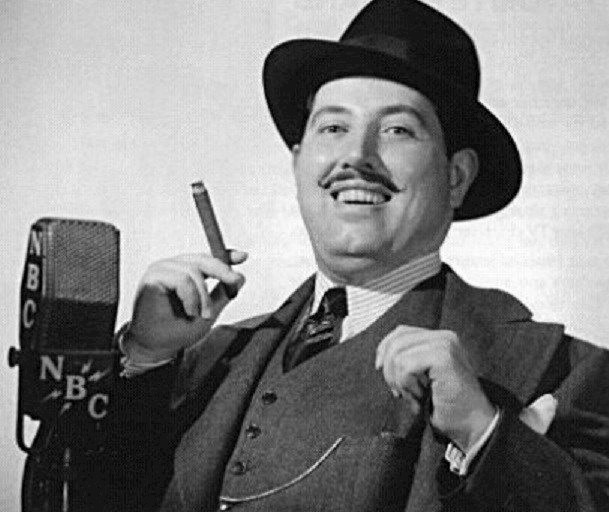
Peary in 1940

The Great Gildersleeve premiered on August 31, 1941, and became a steady hit for the rest of the decade. Peary's sonorous voice and flustered catchphrases were among radio's most familiar sounds. Lurene Tuttle originally played Marjorie with Louise Erickson succeeding her; Walter Tetley, a veteran of Fred Allen's Town Hall Tonight cast and other shows, played Leroy; and, Lillian Randolph played Gildersleeve's ego-puncturing maid and housekeeper, Birdie.

The show's humor, like that of McGee, was drawn through clever word-play and phrasemaking as well as Gildersleeve's earnest stumbling and basically warmhearted nature. His on-screen nemesis was Judge Horace Hooker (Earle Ross), who oversaw his guardianship of Marjorie and Leroy and became a friend and periodic rival in various schemes. Periodically, storylines were serialized, such as some of Gildersleeve's romantic interests and political aspirations; in time, some of the clever word playing was toned down.

Peary also found occasion to weave his singing voice into show episodes, such as "Mystery Voice" in which he referenced his former Spanish Serenader radio persona in a plot involving a Brazilian singer on a local radio show (Mel Blanc guested as the station manager), concurrently referencing his Portuguese heritage. But his best-remembered vocalism would be what radio historians have called his "dirty laugh", a descending giggle that could start from sarcasm and finish in embarrassment or substitute for being at a schoolboy-like loss for words.

Other characters in and out of the Gildersleeve orbit included Richard LeGrand as Peavey the druggist, Arthur Q. Bryan as Floyd the Barber, Ken Christy as police chief Gates, Shirley Mitchell as Leila Ransom, Bea Benaderet as another Gildersleeve paramour Eve Goodwin, and occasionally Gale Gordon as Rumson Bullard, a neighbor who served Gildersleeve the way Gildersleeve had once served Fibber McGee, Gordon's previous character on McGee.

Peary would also feature in four Great Gildersleeve feature films during the 1940s.

== Later career ==
With CBS in the middle of a talent raid that had already tempted away Jack Benny and other NBC stars, Peary was offered a lucrative CBS deal of his own in 1950, after he chafed over NBC's and Kraft's reluctance to let him use his singing voice more often on Gildersleeve and to give him more part in the show's ownership than he already had. Radio historian Gerald Nachman, in Raised on Radio, said Peary and his agents at MCA had negotiated fruitlessly to get Peary a bigger stake in the show's ownership. When CBS began luring Benny (also an MCA client) and others away from NBC, mostly by offering the performers better capital-gains terms against the still-high post-war U.S. taxes than NBC was willing to do, Peary signed with the network.

Kraft Foods, who sponsored The Great Gildersleeve and owned the intellectual property, refused to move the program to CBS. Gildersleeve remained on NBC with Willard Waterman, whose voice strongly resembled Peary's and who had known Peary since their radio days in Chicago, replaced Peary in the title role. Waterman refused to appropriate the famous Gildersleeve laugh however, believing Peary alone should have rights to that trademark, but otherwise slipped easily into the role; Peary himself approved of Waterman's approach, at least on radio. When the series briefly moved to television in 1955, Peary remarked that Waterman, who was much taller than Peary, was too large to pull off the role (Peary imagined Gildersleeve as a small man with delusions of grandeur) successfully on-screen.

At CBS, Peary began a new situation comedy, The Harold Peary Show, sometimes known as Honest Harold, a title that was actually the name of the fictitious radio show the new character hosted. Radio veteran Joseph Kearns played veterinarian Dr. Yancey, known better as Doc Yak-Yak and similar to former Gildersleeve foil Judge Hooker. The new show also borrowed a few Gildersleeve plot devices, such as running for mayor and engagements to two women. Additionally, Honest Harold's secretary at the radio station, Glory, bears a more than passing resemblance to Gildersleeve's Water Department secretary, Bessie. Despite these efforts to recreate the quality and ratings of The Great Gildersleeve, The Harold Peary Show lasted only one season of 38 episodes.

On the March 21, 1951, broadcast of The Harold Peary Show, California governor Earl Warren (later to become Chief Justice of the United States) honored native son, Harold Peary, on live radio, with the only award ever issued up to that time, for having completed his ten thousandth (10,000th) radio broadcast. Peary's record remains unsurpassed in the annals of radio.

== Films and television ==
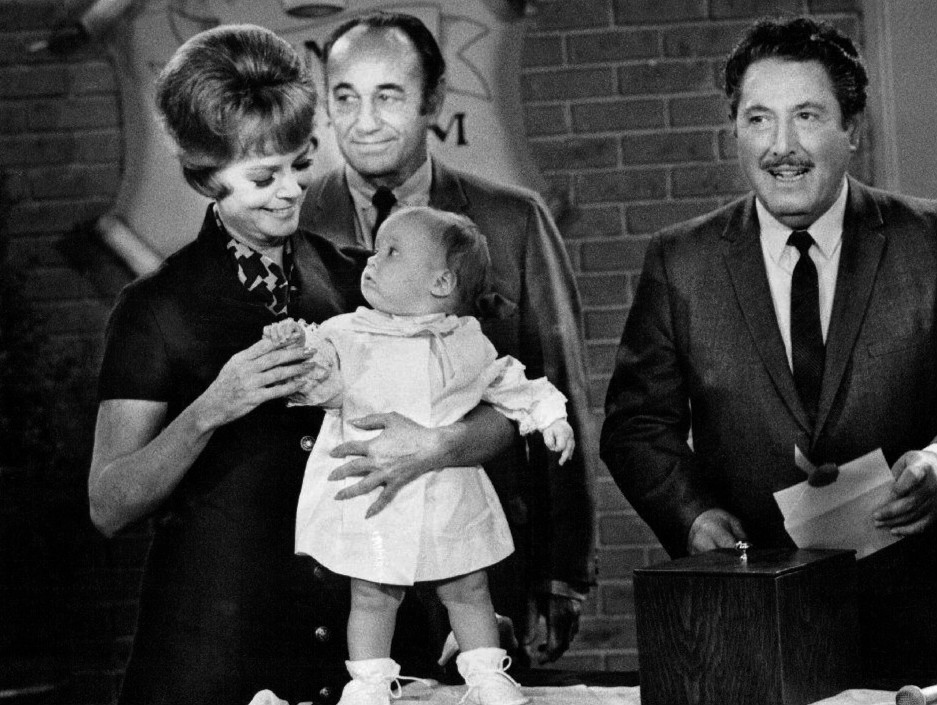
Peary at right as a guest star on Petticoat Junction, 1969

In addition to the four Gildersleeve films (The Great Gildersleeve, Gildersleeve's Bad Day, Gildersleeve on Broadway, and Gildersleeve's Ghost), Peary appeared as the Throckmorton P. Gildersleeve character in these feature films: Look Who's Laughing with the Jordans as Fibber McGee and Molly, Edgar Bergen, and Lucille Ball; Here We Go Again again with the Jordans as Fibber McGee and Molly and Edgar Bergen, as well as Gale Gordon; and the musical comedy Seven Days' Leave with Lucille Ball and Victor Mature. Warner Archives released a DVD collection of the four RKO Gildersleeve movies in January 2013. This five-film set also includes the Seven Days' Leave movie.

Peary also was in the Walt Disney movie A Tiger Walks (1964) and the Elvis Presley film Clambake (1967). He also worked in television, playing murderer Freddy Fell in the 1965 Perry Mason episode, "The Case of the Lover's Gamble." That same year he played Peabody in the Rod Serling-scripted "Sheriff of Fetterman's Crossing" episode of Lloyd Bridges' Western series The Loner. He also appeared in recurring roles in several sitcoms, such as Herb Woodley in the TV version of Blondie, as Mayor LaTrivia in the TV version of Fibber McGee and Molly, and as Perry Bannister in Willy. Peary also made guest appearances in numerous sitcoms during the 1960s, including The Dick Van Dyke Show, My Three Sons, The Addams Family, My Mother the Car, Petticoat Junction, That Girl, The Brady Bunch and Love, American Style. In the 1960s and 1970s, Peary was also featured in a series of popular television ads for Faygo pop.

In the 1970s, Peary found work as a voice actor. He voiced Fenwick Fuddy in Buford and the Galloping Ghost (1978-1979). He voiced Big Ben, the whale with a clock in its tail, in two Rudolph the Red-Nosed Reindeer productions, Rudolph's Shiny New Year (1976) and Rudolph and Frosty's Christmas in July (1979), the latter being Peary's final acting credit.

== Post-network career ==
Peary worked as a disc jockey at radio station WMGM in New York City. Beginning in 1953, he had a one-hour program Monday–Saturday.

Peary spent most of the rest of his life voice-acting in animated work by Rankin-Bass and Hanna-Barbera and others. He appeared in numerous commercials for products such as: Gibraltar Savings and Loan, Charmin, Faygo (as spokes character in a series of spots), Red Goose Shoes, and Challenge Dairy.

== Personal life ==
Peary was a Republican and a charter member of the Hollywood Republican Committee.

== Death ==
On March 30, 1985, at age 76, Peary died in California at Torrance Memorial Hospital after suffering a heart attack.
