= The Great Gildersleeve (American TV series) =

American syndicated TV sitcom (1950s)

The Great Gildersleeve is an American situation comedy television series that was syndicated in the mid-1950s.

== Background ==
The Great Gildersleeve was an adaptation of the radio program of the same name.

NBC made a pilot for the TV version early in 1954 and aired it coast-to-coast with no advance notice in September 1954. An announcement at the end of the broadcast asked viewers to send letters giving their opinion of the episode. More than 21,000 cards and letters arrived, nearly all containing favorable opinions. Network officials hesitated to proceed, so they broadcast that episode a second time, on December 10, 1954, as a one-time replacement for The Red Buttons Show; the results were positive again. Critics reacted unfavorably, however, and two writers revised the format for a new pilot. The second pilot, made in January 1955, satisfied the executives as being "thoroughly Gildersleeve", and they committed to filming 39 episodes.

One unaired pilot had Gildersleeve attempting to return gloves to an exotic dancer. As in the radio series, Willard Waterman had the title role, and Lillian Randolph played Birdie. Tim Considine portrayed nephew Leroy, while niece Marjorie did not appear and was not mentioned. Others in the cast were Richard LeGrand as Richard Q. Peavey, Mary Costa as the dancer, Jesse White as Wilbur Stanton, Jeanne Gayle as Irene Henshaw, and Maidie Norman as a maid.

In July 1954, NBC planned to broadcast Gildersleeve on Saturdays at 8:30 p.m. Eastern Time, replacing The Original Amateur Hour. Although a report in the trade publication Variety said that Amateur Hour was leaving the time slot because of "formidable" competition from Jackie Gleason's program on CBS, NBC executives expected to have many potential sponsors for Gildersleeve. That placement would have given NBC a Saturday night lineup with six comedy shows, which Variety described as "something never previously attempted. As of late July 1954, that 8:30 Saturday slot was the only fully unsold opening in NBC's upcoming prime-time schedule, and the network was insisting that whatever sponsor bought the time must take the Gildersleeve program in it.

In April 1955, NBC's film division authorized production of 39 episodes of Gildersleeve for syndication. Plans called for an initial attempt at a national sale. If that goal was not met by August, emphasis was to shift to regional and local sales efforts. In the first two weeks of sales, the show was bought for 48 markets. By mid-December 1955, it was in more than 100 markets.

== Overview ==
Throckmorton P. Gildersleeve, the water commissioner of Summerfield was the main character. His household consisted of his wards, niece Marjorie Forrester and nephew Leroy Forrester, and housekeeper Birdie Lee Coggins. At work, Gildersleeve interacted with his boss, Mayor Terwilliger, and his secretary, Bessie. Other characters who frequently appeared were Mr. Peavy, the town's druggist, and Leila Ransom. Gildersleeve was a "cigar-smoking, mustachioed, goggle-eyed city official and ladies' man" who was well-intentioned and honest. He was serious about his job and ready to offer advice. Birdie was loyal but spoke her mind freely. Mr. Peavy was Gildersleeve's confidant, and Terwilliger was often exasperated.

Episodes included "Orange Blossoms in Sommerfield", "Private Eye", "Gildy Stews About a Cook", "Practice What You Preach", "The Whistling Bandit", "Gildy Hires an Eager Beaver", "Gildy Goes Broke", and "Gildy, Bard of Summerfield".

== Cast ==
- Throckmorton P. Gildersleeve - Waterman
- Marjorie Forrester - Stephanie Griffin
- Leroy Forrester - Ronald Keith
- Birdie Lee Coggins - Randolph
- Mayor Terwilliger - Willis Bouchey
- Bessie - Barbara Stuart
- Mr. Peavy - Forrest Lewis
- Leila Ransom - Shirley Mitchell
- Lois Kimball - Doris Singleton
- Judge Hooker - Earle Ross

Waterman and Randolph reprised their roles from the radio series. Radio actors Walter Tetley, who portrayed Leroy, and Richard LaGrande, who played Mr. Peavy, were replaced because they were too old to fit those roles on TV.

== Production ==
Episodes were filmed for NBC using the Hal Roach Studios' facilities and staff. The producers were Matthew Rapf and Frank Tashlin, and the directors were Charles Barton, Bob Finkel, and Tashlin. The writers were Richard Baer, Jerry Davis, Joseph Calvelli, John Elliotte, Don Nelson, Jay Sommers, Tashlin, and Andy White. Two episodes were filmed per week in black-and-white with a laugh track, each taking approximately three days. Production ended at 39 episodes, with the life of the series extended through reruns.

== Critical response ==
Hal Erickson wrote in his book Syndicated Television: The First Forty Years, 1947-1987 that The Great Gildersleeve was a "typical TV sitcom" but added that few fans of the radio show were disappointed because it followed the pattern of the radio version. He commented, "The 39 television Gildersleeves did excellent business on the basis of the radio series' following, but the visual version was a bit too complacently reminiscent of every other TV comedy".

Bob Foster wrote in the San Mateo Times that the arrival of the TV version of Gildersleeve was "well worth the wait". He noted that the Gildy character represented a type of character who could be found in many communities in the United States — "the pompous, harmless and bumbling small fry city official". Foster's capsule summary of the show was "It's gonna be around a mightly long time, and it is really not bad comedy."
