= The Great Gildersleeve (film) =

1942 film directed by Gordon Douglas

- Directed by: Gordon Douglas; William Dorfman (assistant)
- Written by: Jack Townley; Julien Josephson
- Produced by: Herman Schlom
- Starring: Harold Peary; Jane Darwell
- Cinematography: Frank Redman
- Edited by: John Lockert
- Music by: Constantin Bakaleinikoff
- Production company: RKO Radio Pictures
- Release date: December 17, 1942
- Running time: 62 minutes
- Country: United States
- Language: English

The Great Gildersleeve is a 1942 American comedy film directed by Gordon Douglas. Based on the popular NBC radio series The Great Gildersleeve created by Leonard L. Levinson, which ran from 1941 to 1950, this is the first of four films in the Gildersleeve series produced and distributed by RKO Radio Pictures. The screenplay was written by Jack Townley and Julien Josephson, and the film stars Harold Peary and Jane Darwell. Other films in the series are Gildersleeve's Bad Day (1943), Gildersleeve on Broadway (1943) and Gildersleeve's Ghost (1944).

== Plot summary ==
Throckmorton P Gildersleeve is amorously pursued by the sister of his rival in town, Judge Horace Hooker. Also, Gildersleeve's niece and nephew concoct a campaign to make him the most popular man in town so the judge won't force the kids to become wards of the court if Gildersleeve doesn't get married and provide the children with a mother.

== Cast ==
- Harold Peary as Throckmorton P. Gildersleeve
- Jane Darwell as Aunt Emma Forrester
- Nancy Gates as Marjorie Forrester
- Charles Arnt as Judge Horace Hooker
- Freddie Mercer as Leroy Forrester
- Thurston Hall as Governor John Stafford
- Lillian Randolph as Birdie Lee Calkins
- Mary Field as Amelia Hooker
- George Carleton as Frank Powers
- George Chandler as Messenger Boy
