= Margie Stewart =

1940s poster model and actress

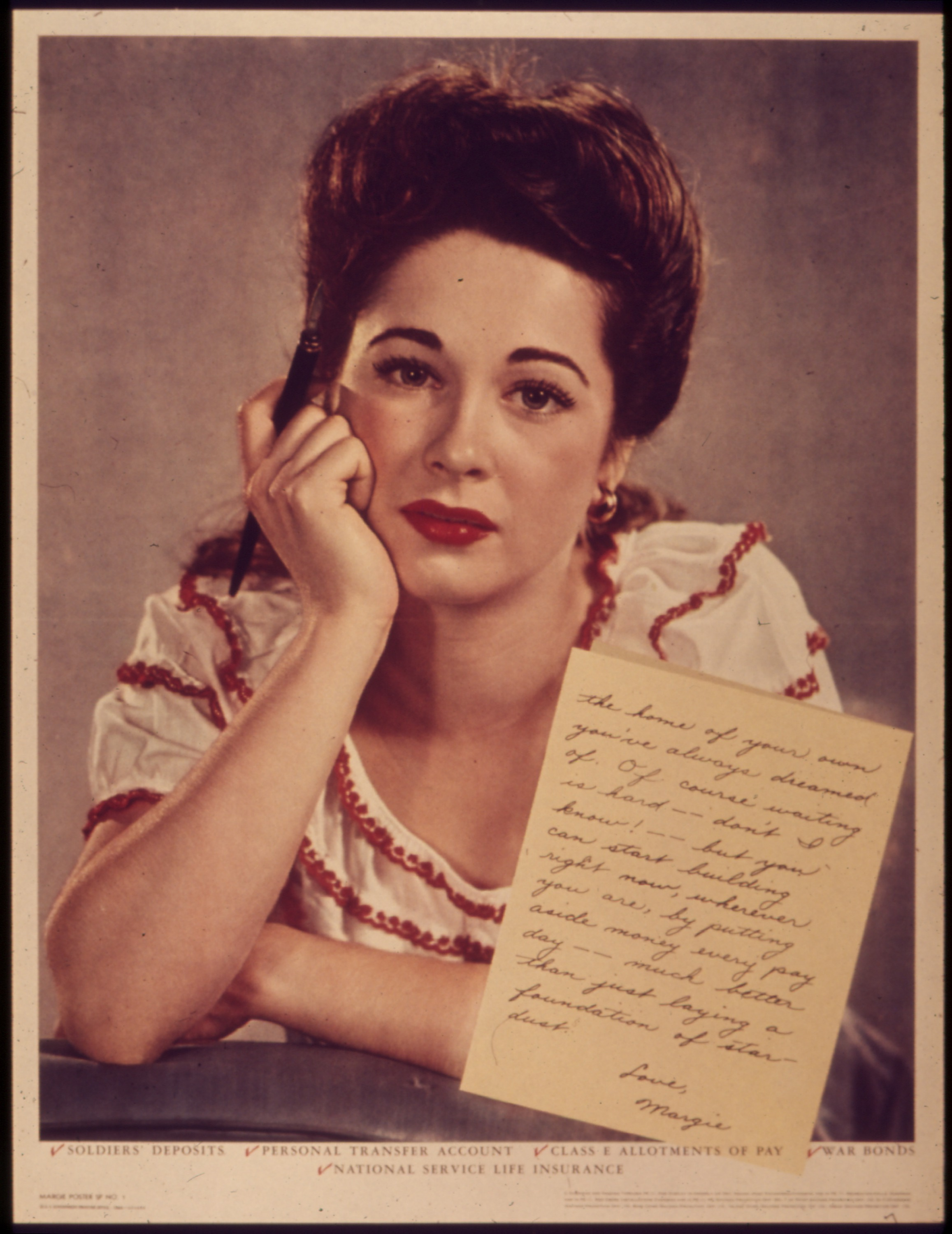
- First of the U.S. Army's Margie posters
- Born: December 14, 1919; Wabash, Indiana, U.S.
- Died: April 26, 2012 (aged 92); Burbank, California, U.S.
- Occupations: Model; actress
- Years active: 1939–1945
- Spouse: Jerry Jeroske (later Johnson) (1945–2003; his death)
- Children: 1

Margie Stewart (December 14, 1919 – April 26, 2012) was the official United States Army poster girl during World War II. She appeared on twelve posters, of which a total of 94 million copies were distributed.

She was born in Wabash, Indiana and graduated from Wabash High School in 1937. She then attended Indiana University Bloomington. She became a model and appeared in about 20 RKO movies, often in uncredited roles. Among her roles was that of Marjorie Forrester, Throckmorton P. Gildersleeve's niece, in Gildersleeve's Ghost.

In addition to appearing in the posters, Stewart toured the U.S. as one of the four members of a group called the Bondbardiers, accompanied by various Hollywood stars, to sell war bonds. In 1945, she toured Europe and was one of the first civilians to enter Germany after the end of the war. Her appearance in London's Hyde Park "caused gridlock."

== Modeling ==
Described as "the U.S. military's official pinup" during World War II, Stewart worked as a model for posters to boost the morale of men in the United States armed forces during that war. A 1943 news brief noted, "Though she quit as a poster model to become a movie starlet ... Margie Stewart will ... appear on two special posters to be circulated by the army among overseas troops -- for morale effect." In 1944, Stewart was described in a photo caption as "credited with being the favorite poster girl of men in the U.S. Army." She also posed for posters on the home front, "promoting everything from war bonds to security."

She once estimated that more than 94 million of her posters were distributed worldwide during the war.

== Later life ==
Stewart and her husband lived in Studio City, California, and produced concerts at the Hollywood Bowl. She also did volunteer work at the Ronald Reagan UCLA Medical Center.

== Personal life ==
In 1945, she married Jerry Jeroske, an army captain. The Jeroskes later changed their last name to Johnson. They had one child, Stephen, and three grandchildren. Jerry Johnson died in 2003.

== Death ==
Stewart died of pneumonia on April 26, 2012, at a hospital in Burbank, California.

== Filmography ==
Year	Title	Role	Notes
1942	Here We Go Again	Girl Guide	Uncredited
1943	The Falcon Strikes Back	Bellhop	Uncredited
1943	Gildersleeve's Bad Day	Barbara - Girl at Party	Uncredited
1943	Bombardier	Mamie Foster	Uncredited
1943	Mexican Spitfire's Blessed Event	Minor Role	Uncredited
1943	The Fallen Sparrow	Dancer	Uncredited
1943	The Falcon and the Co-eds	Pan	Uncredited
1943	Around the World	Marjorie	Uncredited
1944	Show Business	Mary	Uncredited
1944	Gildersleeve's Ghost	Marjorie Forrester	
1944	Step Lively	Florist	Uncredited
1944	Bride by Mistake	Minor Role	Uncredited
1944	Music in Manhattan	Airplane Hostess	Uncredited
1944	Heavenly Days	Bit Part	Uncredited
1944	The Falcon in Hollywood	Girl	Uncredited
1944	Nevada	Dancer	Uncredited
1944	Mademoiselle Fifi	Pamela	Uncredited
1945	Betrayal from the East	Carter's Showgirl	Uncredited
1945	Having Wonderful Crime	Guest	Uncredited
1945	Wonder Man	Goldwyn Girl	Uncredited (final film role)
