= Gildersleeve on Broadway =

1943 film by Gordon Douglas

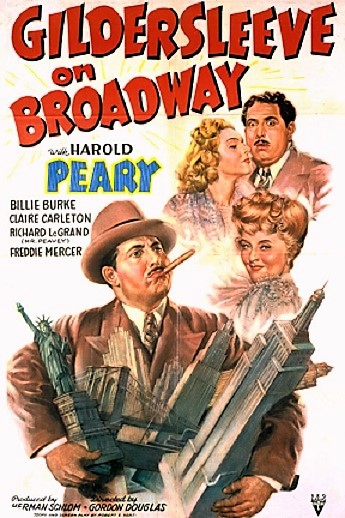
- Directed by: Gordon Douglas
- Written by: Robert E. Kent
- Produced by: Herman Schlom
- Starring: Harold Peary; Billie Burke; Claire Carleton
- Cinematography: Jack MacKenzie
- Edited by: Les Millbrook
- Music by: Constantin Bakaleinikoff
- Distributed by: RKO Radio Pictures
- Release date: October 28, 1943
- Running time: 65 minutes
- Country: United States
- Language: English

Gildersleeve on Broadway is a 1943 American comedy film starring Harold Peary as his radio character The Great Gildersleeve. It is the third of four Gildersleeve features, others were The Great Gildersleeve (1942), Gildersleeve's Bad Day (1943), Gildersleeve's Ghost (1944).

== Cast ==
- Harold Peary as Throckmorton P. Gildersleeve
- Billie Burke as Mrs. Laura Chandler
- Claire Carleton as Francine Gray
- Richard LeGrand as Mr. Peavey
- Freddie Mercer as Leroy Forrester
- Hobart Cavanaugh as Homer
- Margaret Landry as Marjorie Forrester
- Leonid Kinskey as Window Washer
- Ann Doran as Matilda Brown
- Lillian Randolph as Birdie
- Mike Road as Jimmy Clark
- unbilled players include Lawrence Tierney, Barbara Hale, Dorothy Malone, and Teddy Infuhr. as well as Jack Norton and Walter Tetley.
