= Mary Lee Robb =

American radio actress (1926–2006)

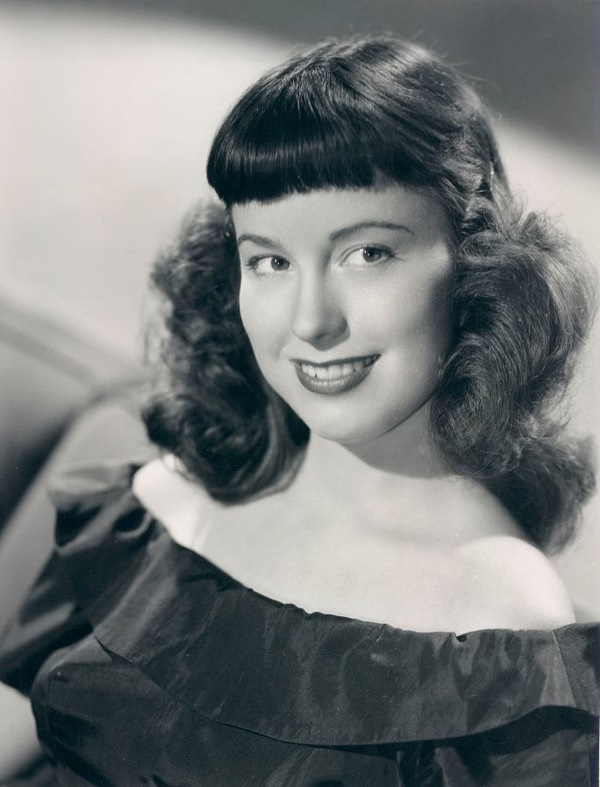
- Robb as Marjorie in The Great Gildersleeve (1948)
- Born: February 15, 1926; Streator, Illinois, USA
- Died: August 28, 2006 (aged 80); Palm Springs, California, USA
- Education: University of California, Los Angeles
- Spouses: Charles Vance Smith (divorced) William Cline (m. 1983; died 2005)
- Children: 2

Mary Lee Robb Cline (February 15, 1926, – August 28, 2006) was a radio actress during the 1940s and 1950s. Her name is sometimes seen as Marylee Robb.

== Early life ==
Robb was born in Streator, Illinois, and lived much of her early life in Chicago. Her father, Alex S. Robb, was an executive at NBC. Her mother, Madeline Bourg-Robb, began working in guest relations for NBC in 1948. In 1939 her family moved to Los Angeles, California, where she attended University High School and University of California, Los Angeles.

== Career ==
Robb made her radio debut in 1947 on the Lum and Abner program. She also appeared on The Penny Singleton Show.

As Mary Lee Robb, she is best known for playing Marjorie, Gildersleeve's niece, on The Great Gildersleeve, replacing Louise Erickson in that role. A small role in a 1948 episode of that program led to the full-time role of Marjorie, which she played until 1954.

== Personal life and death ==
Robb married Charles Vance Smith on December 13, 1953, in Los Angeles. They were divorced later. Robb left acting in the mid-1950s in order to raise their son, Robb Smith, and daughter Alexandra. In 1983 she married William H. Cline, who died in 2005.

On August 28, 2006, she died of heart failure at Desert Regional Medical Center in Palm Springs, California. Mary Lee Robb was survived by her daughter Alexandra, son Robb, son-in-law Alex, and daughter-in-law Melissa. Robb also left behind her two grandchildren, Robbyn and Tyler.
