= The Great Gildersleeve =

American radio comedy series

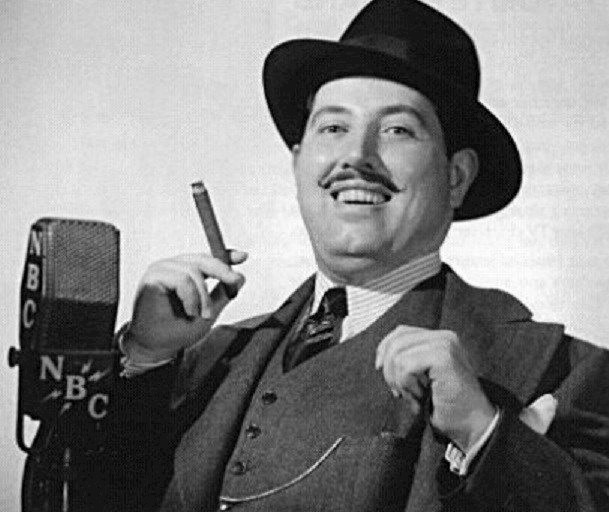
- Peary in his heyday as the Great Gildersleeve
- Running time: 30 minutes (1941–1954); 15 minutes (1954–1955); 25 minutes (1955–1958)
- Country of origin: United States
- Language: English
- Home station: NBC
- TV adaptations: 1955–1956
- Starring: Harold Peary; Willard Waterman; Walter Tetley; Lurene Tuttle; Louise Erickson; Mary Lee Robb; Lillian Randolph; Richard Crenna; Barbara Whiting; Earle Ross; Richard LeGrand; Arthur Q. Bryan; Shirley Mitchell; Bea Benaderet; Una Merkel; Martha Scott; Cathy Lewis; Gale Gordon; Mel Blanc; Conrad Binyon; Mary Costa
- Created by: Leonard L. Levinson
- Written by: John Whedon; Leonard L. Levinson; Sam Moore; Paul West; John Elliotte; Andy White
- Original release: August 31, 1941 – June 2, 1954 (30 minute episodes); 1958 (25 minute episodes)
- No. of episodes: 552 (1940–1954)

The Great Gildersleeve is a radio situation comedy broadcast in the United States from August 31, 1941 to 1958. Initially written by Leonard Lewis Levinson, it was one of broadcast history's earliest spin-off programs. The series was built around Throckmorton P. Gildersleeve, a regular character from the radio situation comedy Fibber McGee and Molly. The character was introduced in the October 3, 1939, episode (number 216) of that series. Actor Harold Peary had played a similarly named character, Dr. Gildersleeve, on earlier episodes. The Great Gildersleeve enjoyed its greatest popularity in the 1940s. Peary played the character during its transition from the parent show into the spin-off and later in four feature films released at the height of the show's popularity.

In Fibber McGee and Molly, Peary's Gildersleeve had been a pompous windbag and antagonist of Fibber McGee. "You're a haa-aa-aa-aard man, McGee!" became a Gildersleeve catchphrase. The character went by several aliases on Fibber McGee and Molly; his middle name was revealed to be "Philharmonic" on October 22, 1940, in episode #258, "Fibber Discovers Gildersleeve's Locked Diary".

"Gildy" grew so popular that Kraft Foods—promoting its Parkay margarine—sponsored a new series featuring Peary's somewhat mellowed and always befuddled Gildersleeve as the head of his own family.

== Premiere ==
The Great Gildersleeve premiered on NBC on August 31, 1941. It moves the title character from the McGees' Wistful Vista to Summerfield, where Gildersleeve oversees his late sister and brother-in-law's estate (said to have both been killed in a car accident) and rears his orphaned niece and nephew, Marjorie and Leroy Forrester. The household also includes a cook named Birdie. While Gildersleeve had occasionally mentioned his (silent) wife in some Fibber episodes, in his own series he is a confirmed bachelor.

At the outset of the series, Gildersleeve administers a girdle manufacturing company ("If you want the best of corsets, of course it's Gildersleeve"); later and during the remainder of the show he serves as Summerfield's water commissioner.

One notable episode entitled,"Cousin Octavia's Visit" features a cousin of Throckmorton Gildersleeve. She travels around the country giving lectures, and usually brings her "bratty" daughter, Barbara Ann, along hoping to get a relative to babysit for her. Octavia is a spoiled mischievous child that makes the Gildersleeve household a chaotic place. During the initial airing of this episode, there were many news interruptions pertaining to the World War 2 outbreak. This episode aired on December 7, 1941.

== Family ==
A key figure in the Gildersleeve home was the cook and housekeeper Birdie Lee Coggins (Lillian Randolph). In the first season, under writer Levinson, Birdie was often portrayed as less than intelligent, but she slowly developed as the real brains and caretaker of the household under John Whedon and other writers.

Marjorie (originally played by Lurene Tuttle, later by Louise Erickson and Mary Lee Robb) matured to a young woman through the 1940s. During the ninth season (September 1949-June 1950) she met and married Walter "Bronco" Thompson (Richard Crenna), star football player at the local college. Look devoted five pages in its May 23, 1950, issue to the wedding. After living in the same household for a few years, the newlyweds moved next door.

Leroy (Walter Tetley), who remained age 10–11 during most of the 1940s, began to grow up in the spring of 1949, establishing relationships with the girls in the Bullard home across the street. He developed interests in driving, playing the drums and dreaming of a musical career.

== Neighbors and friends ==
Outside the home, Gildersleeve's closest association was with the executor of his brother-in-law's estate, Judge Horace Hooker (Earle Ross), with whom he had many battles during the first few broadcast seasons. After a change in scriptwriters in January 1943, the confrontations slowly subsided and the two men became friends. During the second season, pharmacist Richard Q. Peavey (Richard LeGrand) and barber Floyd Munson (Mel Blanc for the first year, Arthur Q. Bryan from December 1942 onward) joined Gildersleeve's circle of acquaintances.

In the fourth season, these three friends, along with Police Chief Donald Gates (Ken Christy), formed the nucleus of the Jolly Boys Club, whose activities revolve around practicing barbershop quartet songs between sips of Coca-Cola.

Several women passed through Gildersleeve's life during the series, including three he almost married before settling into a pattern of casual dating. His friends included Shirley Mitchell (Leila Ranson), Una Merkel (Adaline Fairchild), Bea Benaderet (Eve Goodwin), Martha Scott (Ellen Bullard Knickerbocker), Jeanne Bates (Paula Bullard Winthrop) and Cathy Lewis (Katherine Milford). Another woman in Gildersleeve's life was his inept, milkshake loving secretary Bessie played by Gloria Holiday who became Mrs. Harold Peary in real life.

== Decline and fall ==
In 1950, Harold Peary was persuaded to move The Great Gildersleeve to CBS, but sponsor Kraft refused to sanction the move. Peary, now contracted to CBS, was legally unable to appear on NBC as a star performer, but Gildersleeve was still an NBC series. This prompted the hiring of Willard Waterman as Peary's replacement as Gildersleeve. Peary, meanwhile, began a new series on CBS which attempted to reproduce the Gildersleeve show with the names changed. The Harold Peary Show, lasting one season, included a fictitious radio show within the show. This was Honest Harold, hosted by Peary's new character.

As with most radio sitcoms still on the air at the time, The Great Gildersleeve began a slow but massive reformat in the early 1950s. Starting in mid 1952, some of the program's longtime characters (Judge Hooker, Floyd Munson, Marjorie and her husband, Bronco) were missing for months at a time. In their place were a few new ones (Mr. Cooley the Egg Man and Mrs. Potter the hypochondriac) who would last only a month or so. By 1953, Gildersleeve's love life took center stage over his family and friends. His many love interests were constantly shifting, and women came and went with great frequency. In November 1954, after an extended summer hiatus, Gildersleeve was reformatted as a 15-minute daily sitcom. Only Gildersleeve, Leroy and Birdie remained on a continuing basis. All other characters were seldom heard, and gone were Marjorie and her family as well as the studio audience, live orchestra and original scripts. The series finally ended its run in 1958.

== Television ==
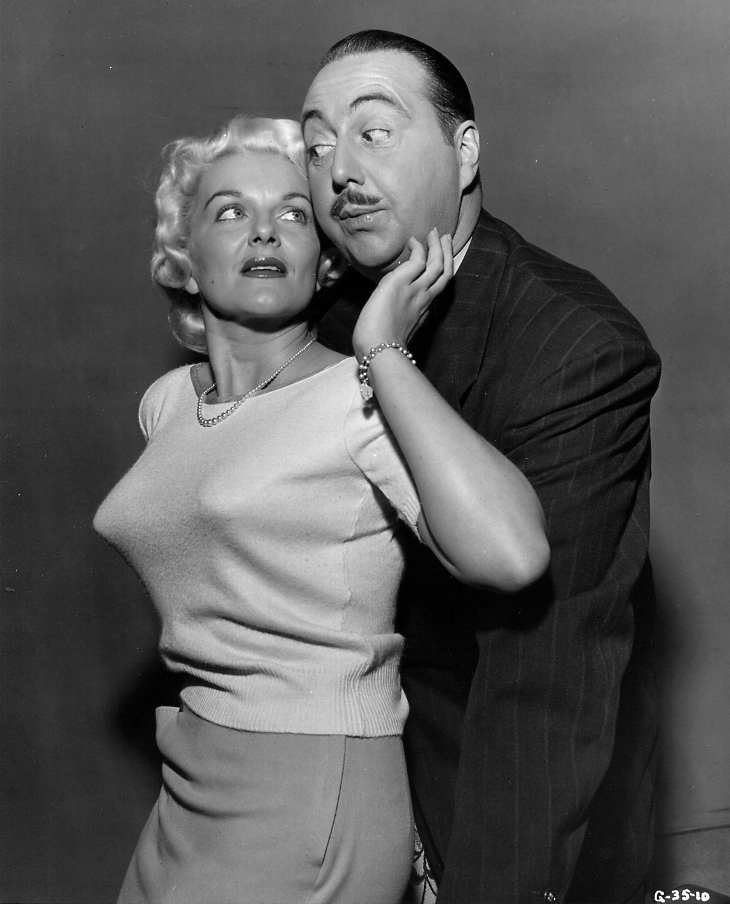
Willard Waterman and Stephanie Griffin in the TV series The Great Gildersleeve, 1955

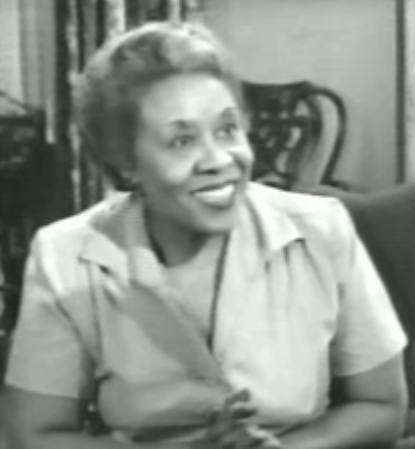
Lillian Randolph as Birdie on the TV version (1955)

As with most radio series, the show suffered from the advent of television. A televised version of the series, produced and syndicated by NBC, also starring Waterman, premiered in 1955, but lasted only 39 episodes. During that year, both the 15-minute radio show and the television show were being produced simultaneously.

On the television series, Gildersleeve was sketched as less lovable, more pompous and a more overt womanizer. Harold Peary stated that the problem with the television series was that "Waterman was a very tall man" and "Gildersleeve was not a tall man, he was a little man, who thought he was a tall man, that was the character." He added, "Willard [Waterman] did a very good job on the radio show" but was "miscast on the television version".

Actress Barbara Stuart landed her first television role on The Great Gildersleeve in the role of Gildersleeve's secretary, Bessie. Child actor Michael Winkelman, later of The Real McCoys, also made his first television appearance on the show in the role of 9-year-old Bruce Fuller. Actor Clegg Hoyt also made his television debut on the series as a carnival barker in "Practice What You Preach" (1955).

== Films ==
After joining Jim and Marian Jordan (as Fibber McGee and Molly) and fellow radio favorite Edgar Bergen in Look Who's Laughing (1941) and Here We Go Again (1942), Peary received top billing for a brief series of RKO films. The Great Gildersleeve (1942) also carried Randolph from the radio cast to the screen, with Nancy Gates as Marjorie and Freddie Mercer as Leroy. Walter Tetley, who played Leroy on radio, could not appear on screen as Leroy because he was actually an adult playing a child character.

Gildersleeve's Bad Day (1943) revolved around the mishaps when he is called to jury duty. Gildersleeve on Broadway (1943) centered on Leroy as the odd boy out as everyone around him is falling in love. The fourth and final film in the series, Gildersleeve's Ghost (1944) had Gildersleeve's ancestors, Randolph and Johnson, rise from the dead to help his campaign for police commissioner.

Warner Archives released a DVD collection of all of the Gildersleeve RKO movies in January 2013. This multi-film release includes a fifth film, Seven Days' Leave, a 1942 Lucille Ball/Victor Mature musical comedy in which Peary co-stars as the Throckmorton P. Gildersleeve character.

A 1960 version of Gildersleeve, still played by Peary, appears in the 1944 Warner Bros. film The Shining Future, a promotional film for war bonds.

== Legacy ==
The Gildersleeve character was parodied in the 1945 Bugs Bunny cartoon Hare Conditioned, in which the rabbit distracts a menacing department store manager by telling him that he sounds "just like that guy on the radio, the Great Gildersneeze!" The taxidermist responds with "I do?!" followed by Gildersleeve's chuckle. The Gildersleeve voice in this cartoon was done by comedian Dave Barry. (Earlier, in A Coy Decoy, Daffy Duck used Gildersleeve's "you're a ha-a-ard man!" line in an attempt to divert a wolf that is chasing him.)

His voice was also imitated by actor Kent Rogers in Tex Avery's 1943 cartoon short One Ham's Family.

Elroy Jetson, the son on Hanna-Barbera's 1962 animated series The Jetsons, is named after Leroy Forrester. Elroy is an anagram of Leroy.

== Recordings ==
At the height of the show's popularity, Harold Peary recorded three albums as Gildersleeve, reading popular children's stories for Capitol Records in heavy-bookleted four-disc 78rpm record albums. Stories for Children, Told in His Own Way by the Great Gildersleeve, was released in 1945 and was Capitol's first-ever such release for children. With orchestral accompaniment, it featured "Puss in Boots", "Rumpelstiltskin" and "Jack and the Beanstalk".

The second album, Children's Stories as Told by the Great Gildersleeve, in 1946, featured "Hansel and Gretel" and "The Brave Little Tailor", again with orchestral accompaniment. The third and final album in the series, reverting to the title of the first and released in 1947, included "Snow-White and Rose-Red" and "Cinderella", once more with full orchestral accompaniment.

The music was by Robert Emmett Dolan. Capitol Records brought in The Great Gildersleeve's chief writers at the time, Sam Moore and John Whedon, to adapt the stories to Gildersleeve's style.

In 1950, Peary, as "the Great Gildersleeve", narrated a single 78 rpm recording for Capitol of Dr. Seuss' Gerald McBoing-Boing with full orchestration and sound effects.

== After Gildersleeve ==
Peary continued his career (often billed as Hal Peary) in films and television well into the 1970s; he was especially active as a voice actor for cartoons produced by Rankin-Bass and Hanna-Barbera, among others. He died of a heart attack in 1985. Waterman, who was a regular supporting character on radio's The Halls of Ivy while doing his version of Gildersleeve, died a decade later.

== Comics ==
A Great Gildersleeve story appeared inside of a 1944 edition of Supersnipe comic book.
