= Riders of the Whistling Skull =

1937 film

- Directed by: Mack V. Wright; Louis Germonprez (assistant)
- Written by: Oliver Drake; Bernard McConville; John Rathmell; William Colt MacDonald (novel)
- Produced by: Nat Levine; Sol C. Siegel (associate)
- Starring: Bob Livingston; Ray "Crash" Corrigan; Max Terhune
- Cinematography: Jack A. Marta
- Edited by: Murray Seldeen (supervising); Tony Martinelli
- Music by: Harry Grey (supervisor)
- Distributed by: Republic Pictures
- Release date: January 4, 1937
- Running time: 58 minutes
- Country: United States
- Language: English

Riders of the Whistling Skull is a 1937 "Three Mesquiteers" Western B-movie of the weird western genre starring Bob Livingston, Ray "Crash" Corrigan, and ventriloquist Max Terhune with his dummy Elmer. It was directed by Mack V. Wright, produced by Nat Levine and released by Republic Pictures. The film is based on the 1934 novel by William Colt MacDonald.

== Plot ==
After Professor Marsh disappears while searching for the lost city of Lukachukai, a party of anthropologists including Marsh's daughter Betty arrive in a Western town to prepare an expedition to look for him. Meanwhile, the Three Mesquiteers have discovered a delirious man wandering the desert and bring him to town where Betty recognizes him as a member of her missing father's expedition. As the man slowly gets his memory back the party wishes to know the location of Professor Marsh and Lukachukai that contains an ancient legendary treasure. The man is murdered with a knife bearing an Indian inscription. The Mesquiteers recognize that the murderer is one of the party in the room. Keen on his detective magazine that he constantly carries with him, Stony and the Mesquiteers lead an expedition to find Professor Marsh, the lost city and its treasure and the murderer. Well-armed devil worshiping Indians and animate mummies enliven the proceedings.

== Cast ==
- Bob Livingston as Stony Brooke, Mesquiteer
- Ray "Crash" Corrigan as Tucson Smith, Mesquiteer
- Max Terhune as Lullaby Joslin, Mesquiteer
- Mary Russell as Betty Marsh, daughter of the missing archeologist, Prof. Marsh
- Roger Williams as Rutledge, another member of the expedition to find Prof. Marsh
- Fern Emmett as Henrietta McCoy
- C. Montague Shaw as Prof. Flaxon
- Yakima Canutt as Otah, an Indian guide travelling with the Mesquiteers
- John Ward as Prof. Brewster
- George Godfrey as Prof. Fronc
- Earle Ross as Prof. Cleary
- Frank Ellis as Coggins, the cook
- Chief Thundercloud as High Priest
- John Van Pelt as Prof. Marsh, an archeologist searching for a lost city in the American west
