= Dick LeGrand =

American sound editor

- Born: Richard Montagne LeGrand; January 27, 1920; Astoria, Oregon, U.S.
- Died: December 29, 2004 (aged 84); Los Angeles, California, U.S.
- Occupation: Sound editor
- Years active: 1956–2000
- Parent: Richard LeGrand (father)

Richard Montagne LeGrand (January 27, 1920 – December 29, 2004) was an American sound editor. He won two Primetime Emmy Awards and was nominated for two more in the category Outstanding Sound Editing for his work on the television programs Batman and Voyage to the Bottom of the Sea, and also the television films The Legend of Lizzie Borden and The Amazing Howard Hughes.

LeGrand died on December 29, 2004, at the Northridge Hospital in Los Angeles, California, at the age of 84.
