= One Big Mistake =

1940 film

One Big Mistake is a 1940 American film starring Dewey "Pigmeat" Markham. The featurette film recreated one of Markham's stage routines for film. The story involves a straightman approaching three comedians and offering them advice on how to handle women. Markham wrote and produced the film. It was filmed in four days with an African American cast. Toddy Pictures rereleased the film in 1947 as part of a compilation of Markham films.

== Cast ==
- Dewey "Pigmeat" Markham
- Lillian Randolph
- Monte Hawley
- Millie Monroe
