= Rosie the Riveter (film) =

1944 film by Joseph Santley

- Directed by: Joseph Santley
- Written by: Dorothy Curnow Handley; Jack Townley; Aleen Leslie
- Produced by: Armand Schaefer
- Starring: Jane Frazee; Frank Albertson; Barbara Jo Allen
- Cinematography: Reggie Lanning
- Edited by: Ralph Dixon
- Music by: Morton Scott
- Production company: Republic Pictures
- Distributed by: Republic Pictures
- Release date: April 9, 1944
- Running time: 75 minutes
- Country: United States
- Language: English

Rosie the Riveter is a 1944 American musical film directed by Joseph Santley and starring Jane Frazee, Frank Albertson and Barbara Jo Allen. It is inspired by the iconic character of the same name.

== Plot ==
In wartime California, Rosie Warren and her best friend, Vera Watson, must share a rented room with two men who work the other shift at the local factory. Rosie keeps the living arrangements a secret from her jealous fiancee. When Rosie falls in love with one of the male roommates and they get their picture in the local paper, hijinks ensue!

== Cast ==
- Jane Frazee as Rosalind "Rosie" Warren
- Frank Albertson as Charlie Doran
- Barbara Jo Allen as Vera Watson
- Frank Jenks as Kelly Kennedy
- Lloyd Corrigan as Clem Prouty
- Frank Fenton as Wayne Calhoun
- Maude Eburne as Granma Quill
- Carl Switzer as Buzz Prouty
- Louise Erickson as Mabel Prouty
- Ellen Lowe as Stella Prouty
- Arthur Loft as Sergeant Montgomery

== Bibliography ==
- Hurst, Richard M. Republic Studios: Beyond Poverty Row and the Majors. Scarecrow Press, 2007.
