= Ken Christy =

American actor (1894–1962)

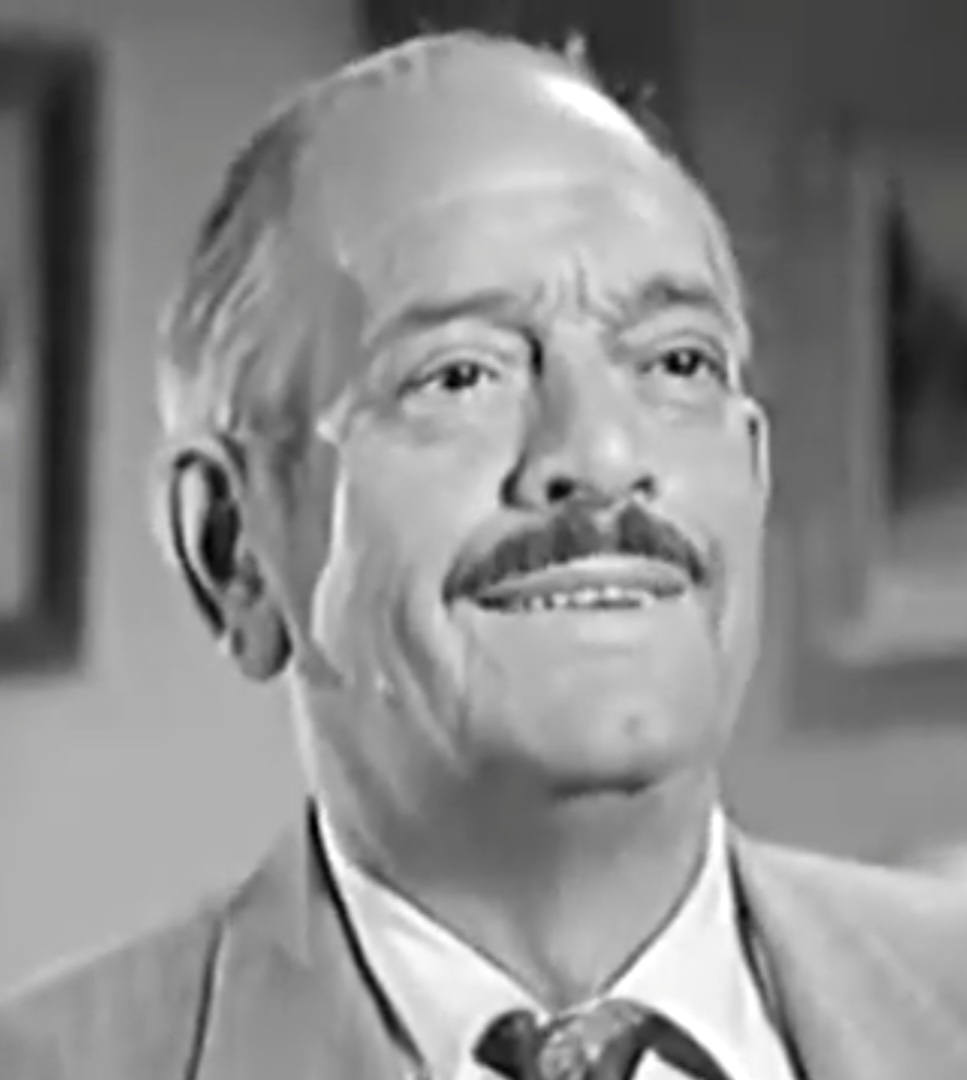
- Christy in Meet Corliss Archer, 1954
- Born: Robert Kenneth Christy; November 23, 1894; Greenville, Pennsylvania, U.S.
- Died: July 23, 1962 (aged 67); Hollywood, California, U.S.
- Resting place: Valhalla Memorial Park Cemetery
- Occupation: Actor
- Years active: 1932–1962

Robert Kenneth Christy (November 23, 1894 – July 23, 1962) was an American television, film, and radio character actor.

== Early life ==
Robert Kenneth Christy was born on November 23, 1894, in Greenville, Pennsylvania, to Laura E Christy (née Campbell) and Francis Marion Christy.

== Personal life ==
Ken married Wilma J Hildebrand in Detroit, Michigan on June 14, 1920, and they later divorced. He then married Barbara Ellen Meikle (professionally known as Barbara Bronell) of Spokane, Washington, a well-known dancer in the area. The couple toured together in Charles George's "Sensations of 1927", a musical comedy revue road show, which featured Barbara's dancing and Ken's comedy. They had one son together.

According to census records, Christy served in World War I.

== Career ==
=== Radio ===
The actor started his career on radio programs. From the early 1930s, he had a nearly three-decade career on radio, with roles in such popular radio series as Little Orphan Annie, where he played Mr. Bonds, The Great Gildersleeve on which he was a regular as the chief of police, as well as portraying several dramatic roles on Suspense. A versatile artist, he was equally comfortable in serious minded programs, such as The Fifth Horseman, Gangbusters, Jack Armstrong, the All-American Boy, and The Saint as he was with comedy series like Amos 'n' Andy, A Day in the Life of Dennis Day, and The Alan Young Show. In the 1940s, he portrayed Inspector Danton on Mystery Is My Hobby.

=== Film and television ===
Christy appeared in 144 films and television programs between 1940 and 1962 and many of his films list him as uncredited. His first acting role was in the film Foreign Correspondent (1940) and his career ended with the television series Shannon (1962).

A 1950 newspaper article cited the predominance of police roles in Christy's film background, saying, "in 98 out of 100 film roles he has played an officer of the law." Christy said, "I'd give anything to stop making arrests and be the guy who commits the crime for once."

Christy's film credits include Burma Convoy (1941), Tarzan's New York Adventure (1942), Cheaper by the Dozen (1950), Sunset Boulevard as the homicide detective trying to question Norma Desmond (1950), A Place in the Sun (1951), Abbott and Costello Go to Mars (1953), Inside Detroit (1956), and Utah Blaine (1957).

His television credits include Gang Busters (1952), Meet Corliss Archer (1954), Death Valley Days (1955), I Love Lucy (1954–56), Celebrity Playhouse (1956), Dragnet (1957), and Wagon Train (1958), General Electric Theater (1959), M Squad (1960), My Three Sons (1961) and Bat Masterson (1961).

== Death ==
Christy died in Hollywood at the age of 67. His remains are interred at Valhalla Memorial Park Cemetery in North Hollywood.

== Selected filmography ==
- Foreign Correspondent (1940) - Fake Dutch Detective (uncredited)
- Dr. Kildare Goes Home (1940) - Dickson - City Council Member (uncredited)
- Third Finger, Left Hand (1940) - Pullman Conductor (uncredited)
- The San Francisco Docks (1941) - Policeman (uncredited)
- Six Lessons from Madame La Zonga (1941) - Employment Manager (uncredited)
- Meet the Chump (1941) - Mug (uncredited)
- Andy Hardy's Private Secretary (1941) - Policeman in Court (uncredited)
- Mr. Dynamite (1941) - Guide (uncredited)
- The Penalty (1941) - Loganville Police Chief (uncredited)
- Pot o' Gold (1941) - Sheriff (uncredited)
- Love Crazy (1941) - Uniformed Sanitarium Guard (uncredited)
- Here Comes Mr. Jordan (1941) - Chuck - Plainclothesman (uncredited)
- Whistling in the Dark (1941) - Inspector Rogers in Show (uncredited)
- Down in San Diego (1941) - Police Captain Flarrity (uncredited)
- Harmon of Michigan (1941) - Joe Scudder
- Unexpected Uncle (1941) - Editor (uncredited)
- Burma Convoy (1941) - Hank
- Three Girls About Town (1941) - Union Man (uncredited)
- Secrets of the Lone Wolf (1941) - Doorman (uncredited)
- Shadow of the Thin Man (1941) - Detective Bringing in Macy (uncredited)
- Design for Scandal (1941) - Court Bailiff (uncredited)
- Ball of Fire (1941) - Cop with Ms. Bragg (uncredited)
- Blondie Goes to College (1942) - Detective Getting Dithers (uncredited)
- Mr. and Mrs. North (1942) - Police Officer (uncredited)
- Yokel Boy (1942) - Cop (uncredited)
- Two Yanks in Trinidad (1942) - Army Officer (uncredited)
- The Courtship of Andy Hardy (1942) - Jenkins, Collection Agency Man (uncredited)
- This Time for Keeps (1942) - Train Conductor (uncredited)
- Lady Gangster (1942) - Jordan - Bank Guard (uncredited)
- Kid Glove Killer (1942) - Police Chief Spencer (uncredited)
- Drums of the Congo (1942) - Captain of the Congo Queen (uncredited)
- Tarzan's New York Adventure (1942) - Second Police Sergeant (uncredited)
- The Mayor of 44th Street (1942) - District Attorney (uncredited)
- Top Sergeant (1942) - Sheriff (uncredited)
- The Big Shot (1942) - Kat, a Convict
- Wings for the Eagle (1942) - Inspector (uncredited)
- Just Off Broadway (1942) - Sheriff (uncredited)
- Bells of Capistrano (1942) - Sheriff's Deputy with Attachment (uncredited)
- Manila Calling (1942) - Logan (uncredited)
- Laugh Your Blues Away (1942) - Mr. Burke (uncredited)
- Lucky Jordan (1942) - Sergeant (scenes deleted)
- Secrets of the Underground(1942) - Investigator Dave Cleary
- Arabian Nights (1942) - Provost Marshal (uncredited)
- Hello, Frisco, Hello (1943) - Paul, Headwaiter (uncredited)
- He Hired the Boss (1943) - Stokes (uncredited)
- Gildersleeve's Bad Day (1943) - Bailiff (uncredited)
- Hit the Ice (1943) - Fire Chief (uncredited)
- Gildersleeve on Broadway (1943) - Detective Delaney (uncredited)
- Northern Pursuit (1943) - Winnipeg Police Desk Sergeant (uncredited)
- Wilson (1944) - Alabama Speaker at Convention (uncredited)
- The Big Noise (1944) - Train Passenger (uncredited)
- Circumstantial Evidence (1945) - Guard (uncredited)
- Cass Timberlane (1947) - Sheriff Alex Carlson (uncredited)
- Jiggs and Maggie in Society (1947) - McDermott (uncredited)
- Scudda Hoo! Scudda Hay! (1948) - Sheriff Tod Bursom (uncredited)
- Sitting Pretty (1948) - Mr. McPherson (uncredited)
- Give My Regards to Broadway (1948) - Ticket Agent (uncredited)
- Cry of the City (1948) - Detective Loomis (uncredited)
- Million Dollar Weekend (1948) - Airline Steward (uncredited)
- The Devil's Henchman (1949) - Police Detective Whalen
- Trapped (1949) - Deputy Marshal (uncredited)
- Cheaper by the Dozen (1950) - Jed - Delivers Telegram (uncredited)
- Sunset Boulevard (1950) - Homicide Captain (uncredited)
- No Way Out (1950) - Officer Ed Kowlaski (uncredited)
- The Jackpot (1950) - Man (uncredited)
- Call Me Mister (1951) - Lieutenant Chief of Staff (uncredited)
- A Place in the Sun (1951) - Warden (uncredited)
- Ace in the Hole (1951) - Jessop (uncredited)
- Strictly Dishonorable (1951) - Train Conductor (uncredited)
- The Tall Target (1951) - Detective (uncredited)
- Criminal Lawyer (1951) - Jury Foreman (uncredited)
- A Millionaire for Christy (1951) - Police Sergeant at Wedding (uncredited)
- The Model and the Marriage Broker (1951) - Mr. Kuschner (uncredited)
- The Greatest Show on Earth (1952) - Tightrope Act Spectator (uncredited)
- Boots Malone (1952) - Doc - Beanery Owner (uncredited)
- Phone Call from a Stranger (1952) - Pier Watchman (uncredited)
- Aaron Slick from Punkin Crick (1952) - Police Sergeant (uncredited)
- Carbine Williams (1952) - Bailiff (uncredited)
- Woman of the North Country (1952) - Drummer (uncredited)
- Something for the Birds (1952) - VIP (uncredited)
- Back at the Front (1952) - Bartender (uncredited)
- Abbott and Costello Go to Mars (1953) - Police Lieutenant (uncredited)
- The Kid from Left Field (1953) - Fan (uncredited)
- Walking My Baby Back Home (1953) - Chris's Cabbie (uncredited)
- Black Tuesday (1954) - Death Row Guard (uncredited)
- Prince of Players (1955) - Theatre Manager (uncredited)
- My Sister Eileen (1955) - Charlie - Police Sergeant (uncredited)
- Alfred Hitchcock Presents (Season 1 Episode 39 "Momentum") (1956) - A.T. Burroughs
- Inside Detroit (1956) - Ben Macauley
- Blackjack Ketchum, Desperado (1956) - Sheriff Mach
- The Werewolf (1956) - Dr. Jonas Gilcrist
- The Ten Commandments (1956) - Slave (uncredited)
- Alfred Hitchcock Presents (1957) (Season 2 Episode 33: "A Man Greatly Beloved") - Dart Thrower
- Alfred Hitchcock Presents (1957) (Season 3 Episode 2: "Mail Order Prophet") - Boss
- Utah Blaine (1957) - Joe Neal
- The True Story of Jesse James (1957) - Conductor (uncredited)
- Fury at Showdown (1957) - Mr. Phelps
- Outlaw's Son (1957) - Mac Butler
- Escape from San Quentin (1957) - Curly Gruber
- Paul Bunyan (1958) - Shot Gunderson
- The Gunfight at Dodge City (1959) - Townsman (uncredited)
- The Big Fisherman (1959) - Minor Role (uncredited)
- All the Fine Young Cannibals (1960) - Conductor (uncredited)
- Ada (1961) - Politician (uncredited)
