= Gildersleeve's Ghost =

1944 film directed by Gordon Douglas

- Theatrical release poster
- Directed by: Gordon Douglas; Harry Mancke (assistant)
- Written by: Robert E. Kent
- Produced by: Herman Schlom
- Starring: Harold Peary; Marion Martin; Richard LeGrand; Amelita Ward; Freddie Mercer; Margie Stewart
- Cinematography: Jack MacKenzie
- Edited by: Les Millbrook
- Music by: C. Bakaleinikoff
- Production company: RKO Radio Pictures
- Release date: September 5, 1944 (US)
- Running time: 63 minutes
- Country: United States
- Language: English

Gildersleeve's Ghost is a 1944 American fantasy comedy film directed by Gordon Douglas from an original screenplay by Robert E. Kent. It is the fourth and final film in the Gildersleeve's series, all of which were produced and distributed by RKO Radio Pictures, based on the popular NBC radio program, The Great Gildersleeve, created by Leonard L. Levinson and itself a spin-off of Fibber McGee and Molly. Released on September 6, 1944, the film stars Harold Peary, Marion Martin, Richard LeGrand, Amelita Ward, Freddie Mercer, and Margie Stewart.

The film initially focuses on elections for the position of police commissioner, with Gildersleeve as a candidate. He tries to boost his chances by investigating a series of questionable scientific experiments. But Gildersleeve's sanity is questioned when he meets the ghosts of his own ancestors, an invisible woman, and a gorilla.

== Plot ==
Gildersleeve is running for police commissioner against the incumbent Haley. He believes he can boost his chances by exposing the questionable experiments being conducted by scientist Wells. His attempts to do so are somewhat hindered by the ghosts of two of his ancestors (both also played by Peary), as well as an invisible woman and a lovesick gorilla—and naturally everyone thinks he is losing his mind.

== Cast ==
- Harold Peary as Throckmorton P. Gildersleeve / Ghost of Randolph Q. Gildersleeve / Ghost of Jonathan Q. Gildersleeve
- Marion Martin as Terry Vance
- Richard LeGrand as Mr. Peavey
- Amelita Ward as Marie
- Freddie Mercer as Leroy Forrester
- Margie Stewart as Marjorie Forrester
- Marie Blake as Harriet Morgan
- Emory Parnell as Police Commissioner Haley
- Nick Stewart as Chauncey
- Frank Reicher as Dr. John Wells
- Joseph Vitale as Lennox
- Lillian Randolph as Birdie
- Charles Gemora as the Gorilla (uncredited)

== See also ==
- List of ghost films
- List of American films of 1944
