= Parkay =

Margarine brand

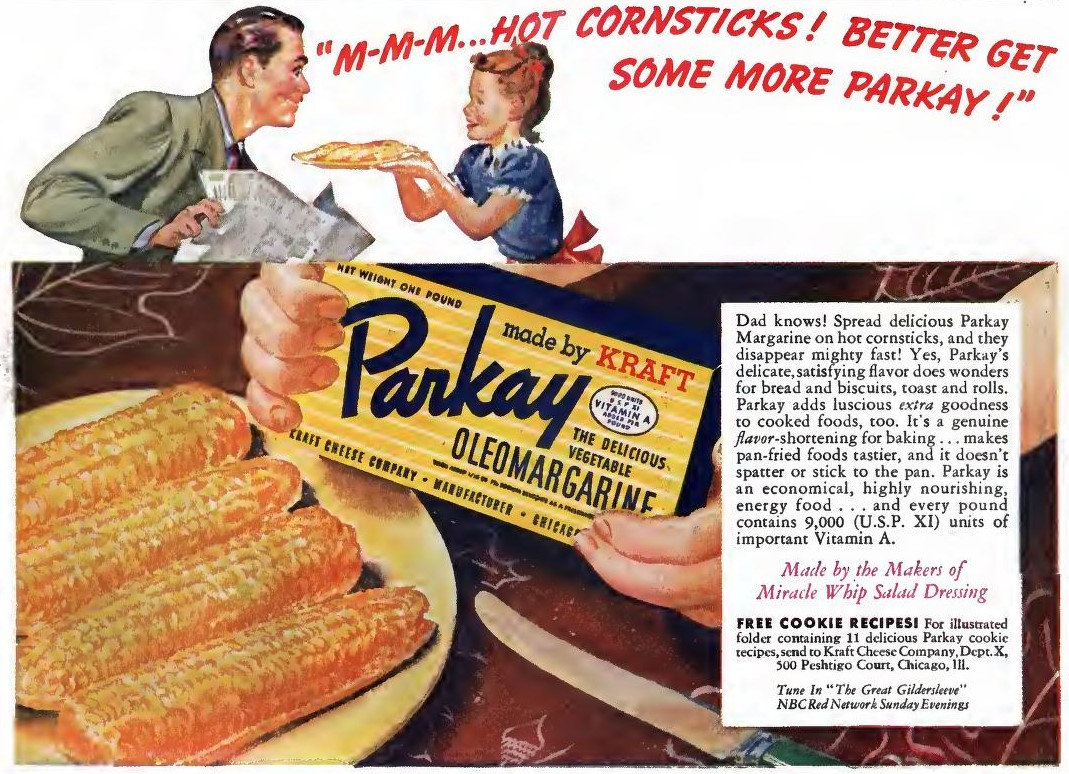
Parkay ad, 1942

Parkay is a margarine originally made by Kraft Foods but was purchased by ConAgra Foods in 1999. It was originally introduced in 1937. It is available in spreadable, sprayable, and squeezable forms.

Parkay was made and sold under the Kraft brand name by National Dairy Products Corporation from 1937 to 1969, then Kraftco Corporation from 1969 to 1976, Kraft, Inc. from 1976 to 1990, Kraft General Foods, Inc. from 1990 to 1995, Nabisco Brands, Inc. from 1995 to 1999, and ConAgra Foods, Inc. since 1999.

== Advertising ==
In the 1940s and 1950s, Parkay was the long-time sponsor of the radio program The Great Gildersleeve.

Starting in 1973, a long-running advertising campaign was introduced for Parkay featuring a mechanically animated "talking tub" of the product. A typical ad depicted a sort of humorous verbal sparring match between a container of Parkay repeatedly saying "Butter" and a human actor insisting that it is actually Parkay. When the spokesperson tastes the product, they conclude that its creamy texture and buttery taste mean it really is butter, to which the container replies, "Parkay." The tagline: [announcer] "Parkay Margarine from Kraft--the flavor says..." [package] "...butter." Along with the TV ad, there was a series of "PARKAY" radio jingles, :30 seconds, written by David Grober and with a variety of performers; the most famous of these performers was Thurl Ravenscroft, who was also the voice of Tony the Tiger.

The 1973 commercial featured a voice over claiming Parkay tastes like butter. An argumentative housewife looks at a square box of Parkay in her kitchen and says "Parkay". The box of Parkay responds "butter", and they go back and forth until she tries a taste of it and she says "butter". At that point, the margarine says "Parkay!" This was possibly the first Parkay Margarine commercial that featured the phrase "the flavor says butter".

The 1975 commercial featured a laughing Latino man arguing with a square box of margarine because when he opens up the Parkay lid, it says to him "mantequilla" (butter) and he did know it is or was margarine. But when he finally tastes it, he then or momentarily says "butter" or "mantequilla" right before the box says "Parkay" in Spanish.

The 1976 commercial featured Todd Bridges, best known for Diff'rent Strokes, along with an as yet unidentified child actor, and followed a similar storyline to the earlier Parkay ads. Similar commercials feature actors Vic Tayback or Mel Stewart.

This ad campaign was also spoofed in a skit from the PBS series The Electric Company (with cast member Skip Hinnant providing the foodstuff's voice).

The brand slogan is memorialized in GangStarr's 1993 hip-hop single, "DWYCK".
