= Frank Redman =

American cinematographer

- Born: August 1901; Fort Lee, New Jersey United States
- Died: March 1966 (aged 65)
- Occupation: Cinematographer
- Years active: 1927—65

Frank Redman (August 1901 – March 1966) was an American cinematographer (director of photography) from the end of the silent era through the 1960s. During his almost 40-year career, he shot over 60 feature films, as well as several film shorts and serials. In the 1950s, he transitioned to the smaller screen, where he was most well known for his work on the iconic television show, Perry Mason from the end of the 1950s through 1965.

== Career ==
=== Early career ===
Redman began his career in film as the cinematographer for the 1927 Pathé Exchange serial, Hawk of the Hills, starring Allene Ray and Walter Miller, and directed by Spencer Gordon Bennet. In 1929, Redman shot another serial western, A Final Reckoning, directed by Ray Taylor, this time at Universal Pictures. 1929 also saw Redman's first feature length credit, when the ten episode serial, Hawk of the Hills, was re-edited and re-issued. During his early years, he was sometimes assisted by another pioneering cinematographer, Linwood G. Dunn. In 1931, Redman began a long association with RKO Pictures, working as one of the cameramen under Edward Cronjager, on the Academy Award-winning film, Cimarron. He spent the next several years working as a cameraman for RKO, working on such films as: Consolation Marriage, under J. Roy Hunt, which starred Irene Dunne; Little Orphan Annie, starring Mitzi Green in the title role, with Jack MacKenzie as the director of photography; Bed of Roses (1933), directed by Gregory La Cava and starring Constance Bennett; the 1934 comedy mystery Murder on the Blackboard, directed by George Archainbaud, starring Edna May Oliver and James Gleason, with Nicholas Musuraca in charge of photography; he'd again work with Musuraca on 1935's Village Tale. Redman was also the cameraman, under director of photography Charles Rosher, for the 1932 classic drama about Hollywood, What Price Hollywood?, directed by George Cukor and produced by David O. Selznick and Pandro Berman. The film stars Constance Bennett and Lowell Sherman, and would serve as the basis for Selznick's more famous, A Star is Born

The end of 1937 saw Redman get his chance to be the lead photographer on a film. On Lew Landers' comedy, Crashing Hollywood (released in January 1938), he was co-director of photography with Murusaca. That same year, Redman was the D.P. on Fugitives for a Night, starring Frank Albertson, Eleanor Lynn, Allan Lane, and directed by Leslie Goodwins from a screenplay by Dalton Trumbo. Also in 1938, Redman was given the chance to be the director of photography on Little Orphan Annie, a film he had worked on as a cameraman in 1932. This version was directed by Ben Holmes and stars Ann Gillis. On the 1938 romantic comedy Maid's Night Out, directed by Ben Holmes and starring Joan Fontaine and Allan Lane was praised for using their "lights and lenses to the fullest advantage." That same year, his work on The Saint in New York starring Louis Hayward, which he was the co-cinematographer with Joseph August, was credited as "furnish[ing] exceptional photography." The following year, he was the cinematographer on another Saint picture, The Saint Strikes Back, this time starring George Sanders in the title role. In 1939, he also helmed the camera on Career, with a screenplay by Dalton Trumbo, and starring Anne Shirley and Edward Ellis. Career was one of two films in 1939 where Redman replaced future Oscar-winning cinematographer, Russell Metty, behind the camera, the other being Bad Lands. He closed the year out as the cinematographer on the drama, Two Thoroughbreds, directed by Jack Hively, and starring Jimmy Lydon and Joan Leslie.

=== 1940s ===
In 1940's You'll Find Out, starring Kay Kyser, Redman's work was lauded as "well—and spookily—done." The spooky comment was referring to the genre of the film. That year he would also shoot the action film, The Marines Fly High, starring Richard Dix, Chester Morris and Lucille Ball; before being behind the camera for yet another Saint film, The Saint Takes Over, again with Sanders in the title role, and with Jack Hively at the helm. Redman would team again with Hively later that year, this time on the sequel to Anne of Green Gables, Anne of Windy Poplars, again starring Anne Shirley. Redman's final film of the year was the musical Too Many Girls, starring an all-star cast, which included Lucille Ball and Desi Arnaz, who met while working on this picture. In 1941, Redman shot Look Who's Laughing, which was produced and directed by Allan Dwan, and stars Edgar Bergen, Lucille Ball, Jim Jordan, and Marian Jordan. Later that year Redman would again film Kay Kyser, this time in Playmates, which also stars John Barrymore. 1942 saw Redman film several notable pictures. The first was the musical Sing Your Worries Away, starring Buddy Ebsen and June Havoc, which was followed by Powder Town, a comedy directed by Rowland V. Lee, and starring Edmond O'Brien and Victor McLaglen. He was teamed with Dwan again later in 1942 on another film starring Edgar Bergen, Here We Go Again, before ending the year with The Great Gildersleeve. In 1943 Redman learned the craft film noir, filming This Land Is Mine, directed by Jean Renoir, and starring Charles Laughton, Maureen O'Hara, and George Sanders; for which The Film Daily said his camerawork was one of the film's many assets. His next film was The Falcon in Danger, starring Tom Conway, which was followed by the gangster comedy Petticoat Larceny, directed by Ben Holmes. Redman's work in the romantic comedy, A Lady Takes a Chance (1943), starring John Wayne and Jean Arthur, was singled out for its quality. His following effort, Government Girl, starring Olivia de Havilland and Sonny Tufts, was also cited for his fine work behind the camera.

A Night of Adventure, a 1944 crime drama starring Tom Conway was Redman's first effort in 1944, which he followed up with his next entry into the "Falcon" series, The Falcon in Mexico, again starring Conway, for which Redman's camerawork received praise. Redman shot half a dozen films the following year, the first of which was Having Wonderful Crime, a mystery comedy starring Pat O'Brien, George Murphy, and Carole Landis. In 1945, Redman also filmed the last ever pairing of Donald O'Connor and Peggy Ryan, in the drama, Patrick the Great. Man Alive, a comedy starring Pat O'Brien, Adolphe Menjou, and Rudy Vallee, was also filmed by Redman during 1945, as was Sing Your Way Home (1945), starring Jack Haley and Marcy McGuire; 1945 also saw Redman shoot the first film in the RKO franchise, Dick Tracy. The nine films he shot in 1946 included The Falcon's Alibi, the ninth film in the franchise; The Truth About Murder, a mystery film directed by Lew Landers; Step by Step, starring Lawrence Tierney, Anne Jeffreys, and Lowell Gilmore; and Criminal Court (1946), directed by Academy Award-winning director, Robert Wise, and starring Tom Conway and Martha O'Driscoll. In 1947 Redman filmed Beat the Band, starring Frances Langford, and two more installments in the Dick Tracy franchise: Dick Tracy's Dilemma and Dick Tracy Meets Gruesome. In 1948 Redman was the cinematographer on two films: the comedy If You Knew Susie, starring Eddie Cantor and Joan Davis; and the film noir, Shed No Tears, directed by Jean Yarbrough. In 1949, Redman was the cinematographer for Ladies of the Chorus, directed by Phil Karlson, and featuring Marilyn Monroe in her first starring role

=== 1950s and transition into television ===
Redman was not very active during the 1950s. He worked on only three films during the early part of the decade, one in each of the first three years of the decade. His final effort on the big screen was the 1952 action film, The Pace That Thrills, also marking the end of his long association with RKO, which began in 1931. Redman transitioned into television in 1956, shooting two episodes of the Zane Grey Theatre. He would finish his career working on the small screen. In 1956, he would rejoin Nick Murusaca as one of the directors of photography on the sitcom, Hey, Jeannie!. In 1957 Redman was chosen to film the last television play written by Paddy Chayefsky, "The Great American Hoax", on The 20th Century Fox Hour. He would see his greatest success on television with his work on the television show Perry Mason, which helped cement the film noir feeling of the show. Redman's final work was on the classic television comedy, Hogan's Heroes in 1965.

== Filmography ==
(Per AFI database - all films as Director of Photography/Cinematographer, except where noted)

- Hawk of the Hills (serial)
- Hawk of the Hills (1929)
- Come Across (1929)
- Eyes of the Underworld (1929)
- Cimarron (1931) (cameraman)
- Consolation Marriage (1931) (cameraman)
- Rockabye (1932) (cameraman)
- Little Orphan Annie (1932) (cameraman)
- What Price Hollywood? (1932) (cameraman)
- Bed of Roses (1933) (cameraman)
- Ace of Aces (1933) (cameraman)
- Flaming Gold (1933) (cameraman)
- The Past of Mary Holmes (1933) (cameraman)
- The Silver Cord (1933) (cameraman)
- We're Rich Again (1934) (cameraman)
- Murder on the Blackboard (1934) (cameraman)
- Village Tale (1935) (cameraman)
- Maid's Night Out (1938)
- Crashing Hollywood (1938)
- Double Danger (1938)
- Fugitives for a Night (1938)
- I'm from the City (1938)
- The Saint in New York (1938)
- Little Orphan Annie (1938)
- Man of Conquest (1939) (additional photography)
- Bad Lands (1939)
- Conspiracy (1939)
- Beauty for the Asking (1939)
- Career (1939)
- Two Thoroughbreds (1939)
- The Saint Strikes Back (1939)
- Too Many Girls (1940)
- Anne of Windy Poplars (1940)
- The Marines Fly High (1940)
- You'll Find Out (1940)
- The Saint Takes Over (1940)
- Along the Rio Grande (1941)
- Look Who's Laughing (1941)
- Playmates (1941)
- They Meet Again (1941)
- The Great Gildersleeve (1942)
- Here We Go Again (1942)
- Powder Town (1942)
- Sing Your Worries Away (1942)
- The Falcon in Danger (1943)
- Flight for Freedom (1943)
- A Lady Takes a Chance (1943)
- Petticoat Larceny (1943)
- This Land Is Mine (1943)
- Government Girl (1944)
- The Falcon in Mexico (1944)
- A Night of Adventure (1944)
- Dick Tracy (1945)
- Having Wonderful Crime (1945)
- Man Alive (1945)
- Pan-Americana (1945)
- Patrick the Great (1945)
- Sing Your Way Home (1945)
- The Bamboo Blonde (1946)
- Criminal Court (1946)
- Ding Dong Williams (1946)
- The Falcon's Adventure (1946)
- The Falcon's Alibi (1946)
- San Quentin (1946)
- Step by Step (1946)
- Sunset Pass (1946)
- The Truth About Murder (1946)
- Beat the Band (1947)
- Dick Tracy Meets Gruesome (1947)
- Dick Tracy's Dilemma (1947)
- Wild Horse Mesa (1947)
- If You Knew Susie (1948)
- Shed No Tears (1948)
- Ladies of the Chorus (1949)
- Make Mine Laughs (1949)
- Double Deal (1950)
- Footlight Varieties (1951)
- The Pace That Thrills (1952)
