= Gildersleeve's Bad Day =

1943 film directed by Gordon Douglas

- Directed by: Gordon Douglas
- Screenplay by: Jack Townley
- Produced by: Herman Schlom
- Starring: Harold Peary; Jane Darwell; Nancy Gates
- Cinematography: Jack MacKenzie
- Edited by: Les Millbrook
- Music by: C. Bakaleinikoff
- Production company: RKO Radio Pictures
- Release date: June 10, 1943 (US)
- Running time: 63 minutes
- Country: United States
- Language: English

Gildersleeve's Bad Day is a 1943 American comedy film directed by Gordon Douglas from a screenplay by Jack Townley. The picture was the second in the Gildersleeve's series produced and distributed by RKO Radio Pictures, based on the popular NBC radio program, The Great Gildersleeve, created by Leonard L. Levinson, and was released on June 10, 1943. The film stars Harold Peary, Jane Darwell and Nancy Gates.

== Plot ==
When Throckmorton P. Gildersleeve is selected to serve on a jury, he is thrilled at the prospect of being able to serve his fellow citizens. The trial is of Louie, a local gangster, who has been charged with burglary. Louie's henchman fear that their boss faces conviction, so they decide to pick one of the jurors to influence the vote for acquittal. They pick Gildersleeve, and send him an anonymous note offering him $1000 ($19,000 today). The note arrives the morning Gildersleeve is due at court, and he shoves it into the pocket of a suit without looking at it. After he leaves for the court, his niece, Margie Forrester, sends the suit to the cleaners.

At the cleaners the owner of the store, George Peabody, finds the note and reads it. He returns the note to Margie, not letting her know that he has read it, but intimating that he knows its contents. After the trial, Gildersleeve is the lone holdout for acquittal. Hearing that the jury cannot reach a verdict, Margie is afraid that her uncle has agreed to the bribe. She attempts to see him at the courthouse, but failing that she maneuvers the judge into allowing the jury to retire to their house for the night, since they are sequestered and need a place to stay.

Peabody blackmails Margie into going to a dance with him that night, standing up her boyfriend Jimmy, and threatens to disclose the contents of the note if she doesn't. While at the dance, Gildersleeve convinces his fellow jurors to acquit. The next day, believing that Gildersleeve has voted for acquittal because of the bribe, Louie has his henchmen pay the $1000, which he steals from the judge's safe. Gildersleeve believes the money is a donation for the USO club of which he is chairman. He takes the money to the judge's house to put in his safe. When he is shown Louie's note, he realizes the true nature of the funds and attempts to steal them back from the judge's safe. During the attempt he is taken prisoner by Louie and his henchmen, using a police car they have stolen. They intend to take him to the country and kill him. As they drive, Gildersleeve unobtrusively turns on the police radio, broadcasting the car's conversation. As the gangsters discuss what happened, they provide enough evidence to clear Gildersleeve of any wrongdoing. Once that happens, Gildersleeve forces the car off the road, crashing it. The thieves are captured and Gildersleeve is exonerated.

== Cast ==
- Harold Peary as Throckmorton P. Gildersleeve
- Jane Darwell as Aunt Emma
- Nancy Gates as Margie Forrester
- Charles Arnt as Judge Horace Hooker
- Freddie Mercer as Leroy Forrester
- Russell Wade as Jimmy
- Lillian Randolph as Birdie
- Frank Jenks as Al
- Douglas Fowley as Louie
- Alan Carney as Toad
- Grant Withers as Henry Potter
- Richard LeGrand as J. W. Peavy
- Dink Trout as Otis
- Harold Landon as George Peabody
- Charles Cane as Police Chief
- Ken Christy as Bailiff
- Joey Ray as Tom
- Joan Barclay as Julie Potter

(cast list as per AFI database)

== Production ==
In January 1943 it was announced that Gordon Douglas had been attached to the project as director. Production on the picture began in February 1943. By the middle of March filming had concluded. The film was finished in May and was previewed at trade shows between May 3–6. The film marked the screen debut of Barbara Hale, who played a small—and uncredited—role as one of the girls at a party attended by Gildersleeve. Also making his big-screen debut was Richard LeGrand, who was more well known for his work on radio, playing the role of J. W. Peavy, which he originated on the Gildersleeve radio program.

== Reception ==
The Film Daily gave the film a lukewarm review, opining that the picture would appeal to fans of the radio program on which it was based, while others would find it contrived and unbelievable. They were not kind to Peary in the title role, but did compliment the acting of the rest of the cast. Motion Picture Daily was even less kind, calling the story "poorly-crafted". They went on to say that the only portion of the viewing public which would enjoy the picture would be that segment which enjoyed his radio show. They felt that the weak plot offset Peary's effectiveness as Gildersleeve.
