= Look Who's Laughing =

1941 film by Allan Dwan

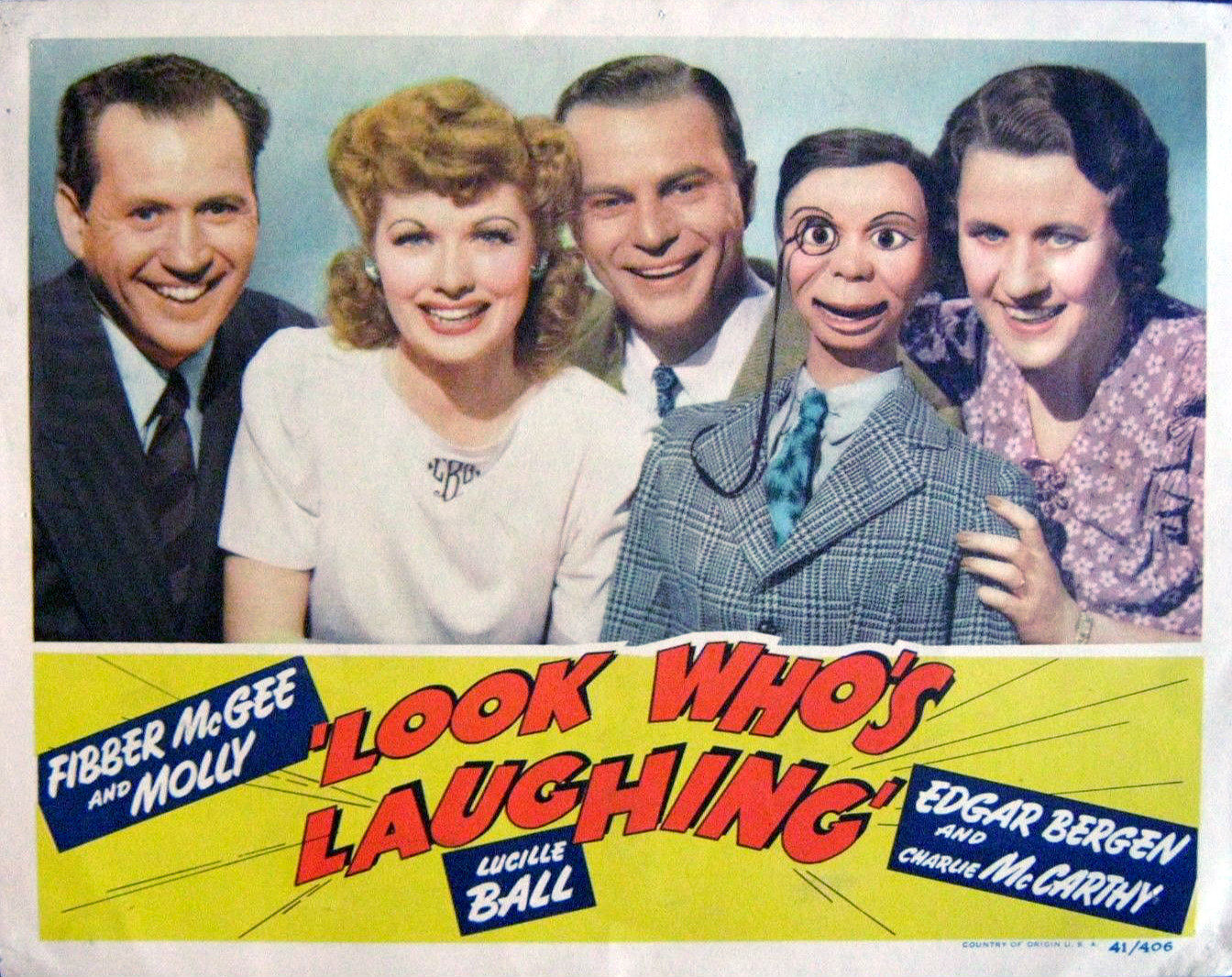
- Lobby card
- Directed by: Allan Dwan
- Written by: James V. Kern; Zeno Klinker (dialogue for Edgar Bergen); Dorothy Kingsley (dialogue for Edgar Bergen)
- Produced by: Allan Dwan
- Starring: Edgar Bergen; Lucille Ball; Jim Jordan; Marian Jordan; Harold Peary
- Cinematography: Frank Redman
- Edited by: Sherman Todd
- Music by: Roy Webb
- Production company: RKO Radio Pictures
- Distributed by: RKO Radio Pictures
- Release date: November 21, 1941 (U.S.)
- Running time: 79 minutes
- Country: United States
- Language: English
- Budget: $400,000
- Box office: $1.2 million

Look Who's Laughing is a 1941 American comedy film directed by Allan Dwan. It was produced and distributed by RKO Pictures. The film is built around a number of radio stars from the Golden Age of Radio and centers around radio personality Jim Jordan as Fibber McGee from the comic duo, Fibber McGee and Molly, who plans to build an aircraft factory in a small town. Look Who's Laughing was followed by Here We Go Again (1942), with many of the radio stars reprising their performances. It is also known by the alternative title Look Who's Talking.

== Plot ==
In New York, Edgar Bergen does his last radio performance of the season, a doctor's sketch with his puppet, Charlie McCarthy, and his assistant, Julie Patterson. After the performance Bergen hosts an engagement party for Julie and his business partner, Jerry Wood. The next day, Bergen and Charlie are set for their summer vacation. Flying in his new aircraft, Bergen gets lost and lands in Wistful Vista, home of Fibber McGee and Molly.

Bergen's almost crash landing interrupts a meeting with Wistful Vista's Chamber of Commerce. Fibber, the president, has just proposed the selling of the town's airstrip to Hilary Horton, owner of the Horton Aircraft Factory. The Chamber and townspeople thought Bergen's aircraft was carrying Horton.

Bergen and Charlie are welcomed with Fibber and Molly inviting them to stay at their home. Learning of Fibber's plans, Bergen offers to convince Hilary, his friend, to build his factory at Wistful Vista. Throckmorton P. Gildersleeve, secretly working for Ironton Realty, a rival company wanting to purchase Horton's factory, gets a scoop of Fibber and Bergen's plans. He goes to Sam Cudahy, owner of Ironton Realty, planning to back out of Cudahy's schemes. Threatened by blackmail, Gildersleeve tricks Fibber into paying for an elaborate luncheon to honor their guest. Gildersleeve's trickery continues when he meets Charlie McCarthy, fed up staying at Wistful Vista and wanting to find a way to leave town. Gildersleeve suggests that Charlie sends a fake telegram to Bergen saying that his former assistant, Julie Patterson, is ill. On the day Bergen is to fly Hilary Horton to Wistful Vista, he receives the telegram, thus suddenly changing his plans.

Bergen arrives back in New York, discovering Julie is well. Returning quickly to Wistful Vista with a protesting Julie in tow. Bergen's business partner, Jerry, with his former fiancée and Julie's replacement, Marge, search for Julie. Meanwhile, Fibber, humiliated, resigned from the Chamber of Commerce. His house is also in foreclosure and Cudahy purchased the airstrip.

Charlie confesses to Julie that Gildersleeve suggested sending the fake telegram. Julie then devises a scheme to foil Cudahy into investing in some worthless land belonging to Fibber and for Gildersleeve to trade his land for the airstrip. Bergen successfully convinces Hilary to fly into Wistful Vista. Meanwhile, Jerry and Marge, still searching for Julie, have decided that they are still in love and get married. Back at the McGees', Molly discovers that Julie is in love with Bergen and advises her to "sabotage" him into marriage.

Everyone drives to the airstrip to meet Horton. As Fibber and Molly wait in Bergen's aircraft, he and Julie greet Jerry and Marge, who have just driven into town. When Fibber accidentally takes off, Julie and Bergen follow in another aircraft. Horton's aircraft is also coming and Fibber nearly crashes into him. Bergen climbs aboard the aircraft, and safely lands Fibber and Molly. After returning to the McGee house, Jerry and Marge announce their marriage. At that moment, Horton arrives and informs Bergen that he owns a controlling interest in the Horton company and can build a factory wherever he desires. So, with Fibber's good name restored, Julie embraces Bergen.

== Cast ==
- Edgar Bergen as himself
- Charlie McCarthy as himself
- Jim Jordan as Fibber McGee
- Marian Jordan as Molly McGee
- Harold Peary as Throckmorton P. Gildersleeve
- Lucille Ball as Julie Patterson
- Dorothy Lovett as Marge
- Isabel Randolph as Abigail Uppington
- Lee Bonnell as Jerry Wood
- Charles Halton as Sam Cudahy
- Neil Hamilton as Hilary Horton
- Spencer Charters as Motel Manager
- Jed Prouty as Mayor
- Dot Farley as Mary Blaize
- Dorothy Lloyd as Maisie/Matilda
- Sterling Holloway as Rusty
- George Cleveland as Kelsey

== Production ==
Principal photography on Look Who's Laughing took place beginning on May 13, 1941 and ending late June 1941. The working title of the film was Look Who's Talking. In the opening credits of Look Who's Laughing, "the two "O's" in the word "look" become eyeballs and the "O" in the word "who" turns into a laughing mouth."

In a March 12, 1941 story on its pre-production, the New York Times headlined "Lucille Ball and Husband, Desi Arnaz, to Co-Star." Arnaz ended up being replaced. It would take ten more years to act with wife Ball, in TV's I Love Lucy in 1951.

== Reception ==
Film historians Richard Jewell and Vernon Harbin in The RKO Story (1982) considered Look Who's Laughing a surprise winner at the box office. "Released just after the Japanese bombing of Pearl Harbor, it had a certain topicality and lunatic attractiveness, but the precise reasons for the picture's sizeable box-office success must forever remain a mystery." (Note: Although Look Who's Laughing was released before the attack on Pearl Harbor, most of the screenings took place as America was going to war, giving the film a "topicality".) The film historians did pinpoint one performance, "Lucille Ball gave a standout performance as Bergen's secretary."

Film reviewer Jim Craddock in a review of Look Who's Laughing in the VideoHound's Golden Movie Retriever: 2002 compendium was charitable about a film where radio stars conveniently drop into a town, writing, "Not much plot here, but it might be worth a look to fans of the stars, including Jim and Marion[sic] Jordan, better known as Fibber McGee and Molly."
