= Here We Go Again (film) =

1942 American film directed by Allan Dwan

- Theatrical release poster
- Directed by: Allan Dwan
- Written by: Paul Gerard Smith; Joe Bigelow; Zeno Klinker (dialogue for Edgar Bergen); Dorothy Kingsley (dialogue for Edgar Bergen); Royal Foster (dialogue for Edgar Bergen)
- Produced by: Allan Dwan
- Starring: Jim Jordan; Marian Jordan; Edgar Bergen; Charlie McCarthy; Harold Peary; Ginny Simms
- Cinematography: Frank Redman
- Edited by: Desmond Marquette
- Music by: Constantin Bakaleinikoff Director; Roy Webb; Mort Green (Composer); Harry Revel (Composer)
- Production company: RKO Radio Pictures, Inc.
- Distributed by: RKO Radio Pictures, Inc.
- Release date: October 9, 1942
- Running time: approx. 76 minutes
- Country: United States
- Language: English
- Box office: $1.3 million (US rentals)

Here We Go Again is a 1942 American comedy film, a sequel to Look Who's Laughing. With RKO in financial trouble, with the success of the earlier zany comedy starring a bevy of radio stars, Here We Go Again put Fibber McGee and Molly in a search for where to celebrate the couple's 20th anniversary. They want to throw a big party but when everyone declines their invitation, they decide to go on a second honeymoon instead.

Right on cue, Fibber McGee and Molly's second honeymoon goes awry. Ultimately, the pair bumps into their old friends Edgar Bergen, Charlie McCarthy and the Great Gildersleeve (Harold Peary), along with others. With the anniversary party on again, the only problem is, how will Fibber McGee (Jim Jordan) pay for all of this?

== Plot ==
As Fibber McGee and Molly celebrate their 20th anniversary, they throw a large shindig, but everyone declines their invitation to the Silver Tip Lodge at Lake Arcadia. Discouraged, the McGees decide to have their own celebration—to relive their first honeymoon night at the Ramble Inn. Fibber and Molly are again discouraged upon finding that the inn has gone to ruin. Still, they decide to stay the night. The next morning, the McGees leave Ramble Inn and Fibber insists, despite their finances, that they head to Lake Arcadia and spend at least one night at the Silver Tip Lodge.

As Fibber checks into the lodge Molly bumps into her old beau, Otis Cadwalader (Gale Gordon). When Fibber, naturally jealous, has to be cordial to Cadwalader, he replies, "I've got bad news for you...I'm fine!" Also at the lodge, the McGees meet up with some old acquaintances: ventriloquist Edgar Bergen, his puppet, Charlie McCarthy, Throckmorton P. Gildersleeve (Harold Peary) and Abigail Uppington (Isabel Randolph). Fibber, not admitting he is broke, rents the bridal suite and chooses to have their once cancelled anniversary party held at the lodge.

Still in the lobby, Cadwalader asks Fibber and offers to pay him if he can convince Bergen to invest in a synthetic gasoline formula developed by inventor Wallace Wimple (Bill Thompson). Fibber is able to visit Wimple and see his formula in action; he agrees to partner with Cadwalader.

Meanwhile, Bergen and Charlie have been asked by an institute to find a rare silk-spinning moth. During a search, they are met by Gildersleeve's sister, Jean (Ginny Simms), and her troop of girl guides. Bergen successfully finds a specimen and rushes back to the lodge to phone the institute, leaving Charlie to flirt with the girls.

At the McGee's party that night, Fibber arranged for bandleader Ray Noble to provide the musical accompaniment. Charlie continues romancing the girl guides and Fibber talks to Bergen about Cadwalader's scheme. Bergen agrees to write Fibber a check on the condition that it not be cashed until he has a chance to investigate Cadwalader. As soon as Bergen leaves, however, Cadwalader snatches the check out of Fibber's hands. As the party progresses, Abigail Uppington, dressed as an Indian, begins to recite "The Song of Hiawatha." Bergen notices a branch Uppington has clutched in her hand. It is covered with silkworm cocoons. Bergen asked where to find those branches; he is directed by puppet Mortimer Snerd, to an Indian reservation.

Bergen sneaks into the reservation as an Indian squaw, and Charlie as his papoose. When the Indians threaten Bergen, he uses his ventriloquism to throw his voice at a totem pole. The chief of the tribe is fearfully impressed at the speaking totem. As Bergen searches for the cocoons, Charlie makes advances to the other Indian squaws, angering the Indians. Fleeing from the reservation, Bergen and Charlie return to their laboratory with the cocoons.

Back at the Silver Tip Lodge, Fibber tells Molly about his business deal with Cadwalader. However, when Wimple confides that his formula doesn't work, Molly approaches Cadwalader about returning Bergen's money. Meanwhile, Bergen informs Jean of his disappointment when he discovers that the cocoons are too brittle to unweave. Soon after, Fibber arrives with a sample of the formula and the bad news about Wimple's discovery. In the rush of everything that is happening, Charlie accidentally spills the formula on the cocoons. To their delight, Jean and Bergen discover that the formula releases the silk threads. Returning to the lodge, Bergen, Jean, Charlie, and Fibber learn that Molly has driven off in a carriage with Cadwalader.

Bergen and Fibber pursue the carriage on a wagon loaded with dynamite while Jean and Charlie follow by car. The chase ends when Molly pulls the carriage off the road, and the wagon is caught on a cliff. All ends happily as Bergen offers to buy the formula, Molly tells Fibber that she wasn't running away with Cadwalader but was driving him out of town to avoid a scandal. Molly and Fibber, Jean and Bergen embrace to the sound of exploding dynamite, leaving Charlie to say, "Wow! ... Anybody wanna adopt an orphan?"

== Cast ==
- Jim Jordan as Fibber McGee
- Marian Jordan as Molly
- Edgar Bergen as himself
- Charlie McCarthy as himself
- Harold Peary as Throckmorton P. Gildersleeve
- Gale Gordon as Otis Cadwalader
- Ginny Simms as Jean Gildersleeve
- Isabel Randolph as Abigail Uppington
- Bill Thompson as Wallace Wimple
- Ray Noble as himself
- Jerry Maren (Stand-in for Charlie McCarthy)
- Patti McCarty as girl guide (uncredited)

== Production ==
The principal photography on Here We Go Again took place from late May to mid-July 1942.

== Reception ==
Here We Go Again made RKO a profit of $228,000.

Film historians Richard Jewell and Vernon Harbin in The RKO Story (1982) considered Here We Go Again, "provided sorely needed profits for the beleaguered studio." (Note: Here We Go Again propelled Harold Peary as Throckmorton P. Gildersleeve (the Great Gildersleeve) to a series of his own.) The film historians did identify the main failing of Here We Go Again, "Faced with dreaming up a story that would make use of the various comedians and other divergent talents, Paul Gerard Smith gave in to his most preposterous impulses, which was just fine with audiences ..."
