= Lillian Randolph =

American actress and singer (1898–1980)

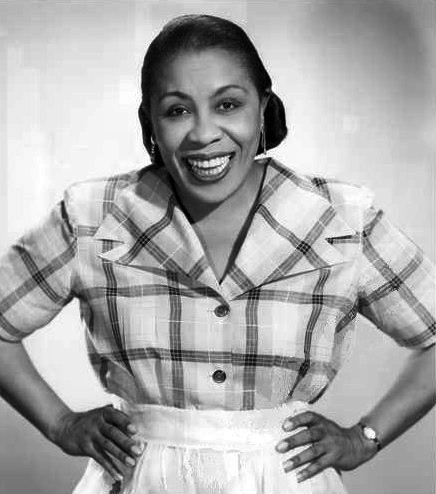
- Randolph in 1952
- Born: Castello Randolph; December 14, 1898; Knoxville, Tennessee, U.S.
- Died: September 12, 1980 (aged 81); Los Angeles, California, U.S.
- Occupations: Actress; singer
- Years active: 1931–1980
- Spouse(s): Jack Chase Edward Sanders (m. 1951; div. 1953) ? McKee (Note: There was also a fourth husband – Lillian Randolph McKee)
- Children: 2, including Barbara Randolph
- Relatives: Amanda Randolph (sister)

Lillian Randolph (born Castello Randolph; December 14, 1898 – September 12, 1980) was an American actress and singer, a veteran of radio, film, and television. She worked in entertainment from the 1930s until shortly before her death. She appeared in hundreds of radio shows, motion pictures, short subjects, and television shows.

Randolph is most recognized for appearing in It's a Wonderful Life (1946), Magic (1978), and her final onscreen project, The Onion Field (1979). She prominently contributed her voice to the housekeeper in nineteen Tom and Jerry cartoons released between 1940 and 1952.

== Early life and education ==
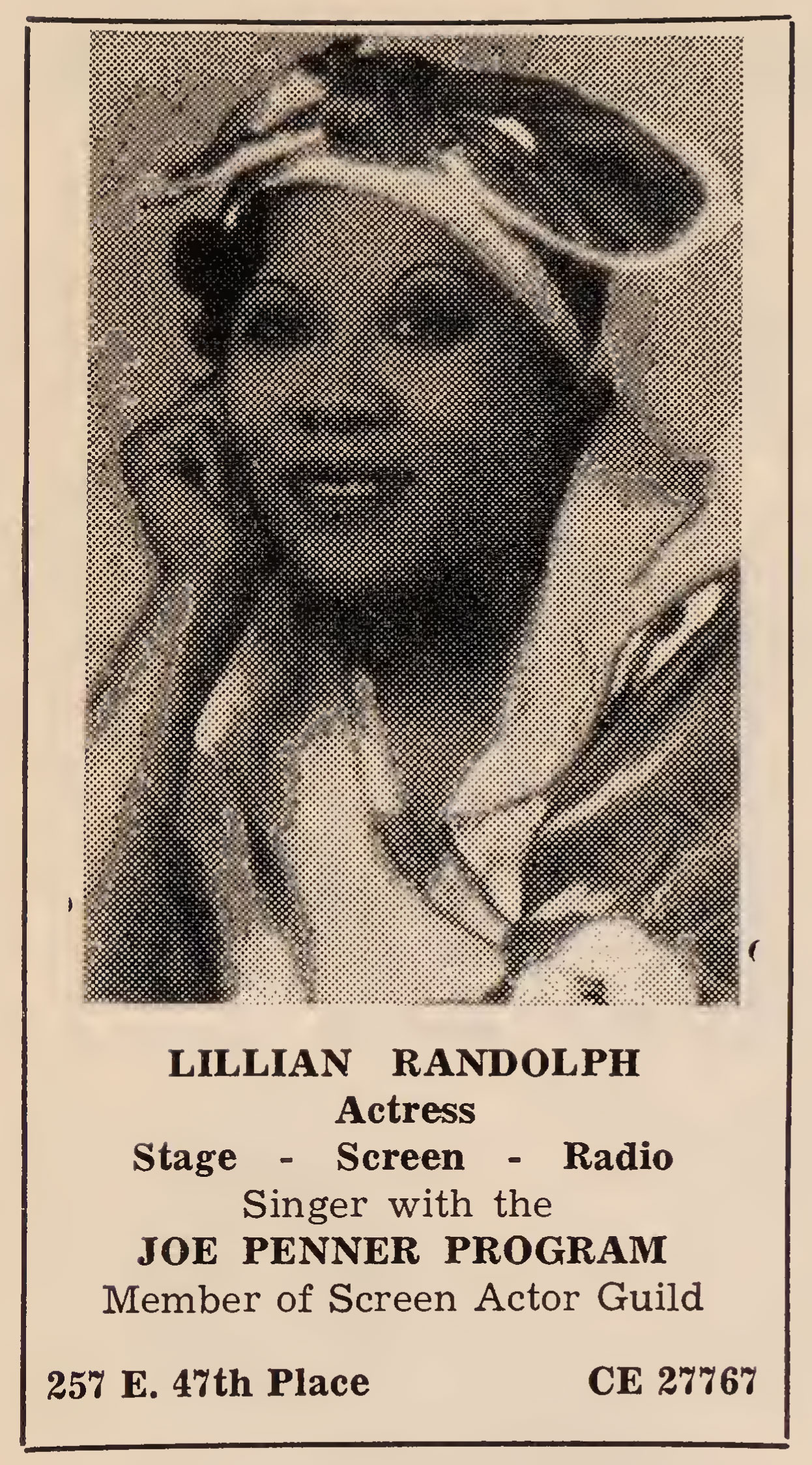
Randolph's 1939 advertisement

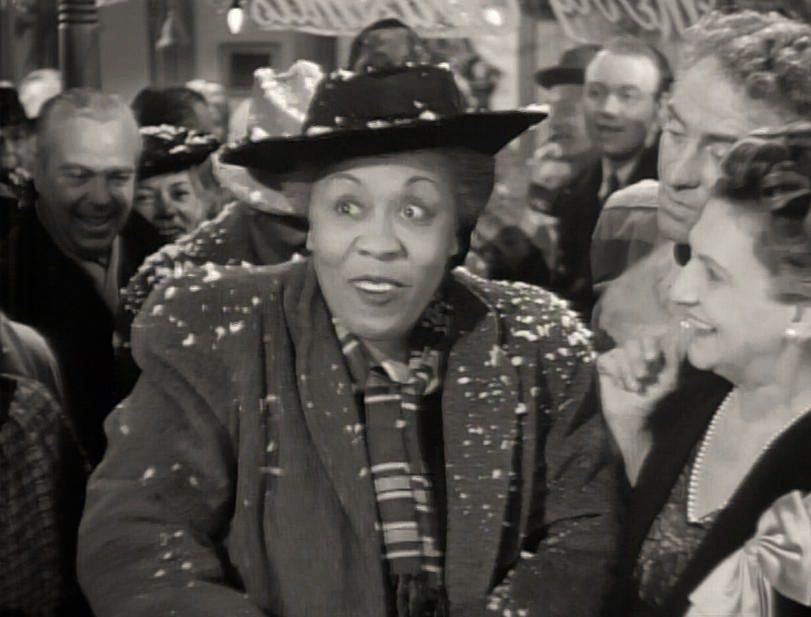
Randolph as Annie in It's a Wonderful Life in 1946

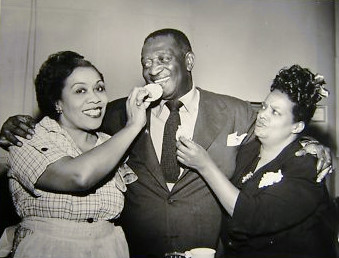
From left to right: Randolph as Beulah, Ernest Whitman as Bill, and Ruby Dandridge as Oriole in Beulah, c. 1952–53

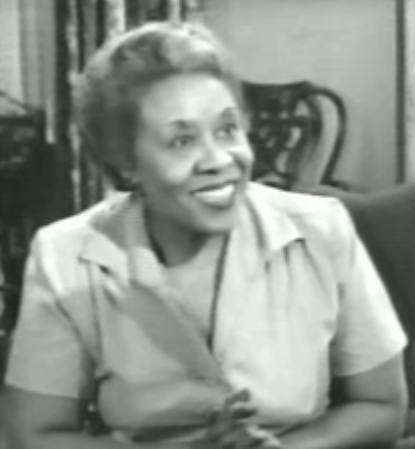
Lillian Randolph as Birdie on TV's The Great Gildersleeve in 1955

Randolph was born Castello Randolph in 1898 in Knoxville, Tennessee, the daughter of a Methodist minister and a teacher. She was the younger sister of actress Amanda Randolph. (Note: Steve Gibson, with his Rhythm and Blues group, The Five Red Caps, was said to be a brother. However, this cannot be substantiated.)

== Career ==
=== Radio ===
Randolph began her professional career singing on local radio in Cleveland and Detroit. At WXYZ in Detroit, she was noticed by George W. Trendle, station owner and developer of The Lone Ranger. He got her into radio training courses, which paid off in roles for local radio shows. Randolph was tutored by a white actor for three months on racial dialect prior to obtaining any radio roles.

In 1936, she moved on to Los Angeles to work on Al Jolson's radio show, on Big Town, on the Al Pearce show, and to sing at the Club Alabam.

=== Actress ===
Randolph and her sister Amanda were continually looking for roles to make ends meet. In 1938, she opened her home to Lena Horne, who was in California for her first movie role in The Duke Is Tops (1938); the film was so tightly budgeted, Horne had no money for a hotel.

Randolph opened her home during World War II with weekly dinners and entertainment for service people in the Los Angeles area through American Women's Voluntary Services.

Randolph played the role of the maid Birdie Lee Coggins in The Great Gildersleeve, a radio comedy and subsequent films, and as Madame Queen on the Amos 'n' Andy radio show and television show from 1937 to 1953. She also portrayed Birdie in the television version of The Great Gildersleeve. She was cast in the Gildersleeve job on the basis of her wonderful laugh. She had been a member of the chorus at MGM when, during a rehearsal break, she heard that auditions were underway for Gildersleeve. Randolph made a dash to NBC. She ran down the halls; when she opened the door for the program, she fell on her face. Randolph was not hurt and she laughed, which got her the job.

In 1955, Lillian was asked to perform the Gospel song, "Were You There" on the television version of the Gildersleeve show. The positive response from viewers resulted in a Gospel album by Randolph on Dootone Records. She found the time for the role of Mrs. Watson on The Baby Snooks Show and Daisy on The Billie Burke Show.

Her best known film roles were those of Annie in It's a Wonderful Life (1946) and Bessie in The Bachelor and the Bobby-Soxer (1947).

The West Adams district of Los Angeles was once home to lawyers and tycoons, but during the 1930s, many residents were either forced to sell their homes or take in boarders because of the economic times. The bulk of the residents who were earlier members of the entertainment community had already moved to places such as Beverly Hills and Hollywood. In the 1940s, members of the African-American entertainment community discovered the charms of the district and began purchasing homes there, giving the area the nickname "Sugar Hill". Hattie McDaniel was one of the first African-American residents. In an attempt to discourage African-Americans from making their homes in the area, some residents resorted to adding covenants to the contracts when their homes were sold, either restricting African-Americans from purchasing them or prohibiting them from occupying the houses after purchase. Lillian and her husband, boxer Jack Chase, were victims of this type of discrimination.

In 1946, the couple purchased a home on West Adams Boulevard with a restrictive covenant that barred them from moving into it. The US Supreme Court declared the practice unconstitutional in 1948. After divorcing Chase, Randolph married railroad dining car server Edward Sanders, in August 1951. The couple divorced in December 1953.

Like her sister, Amanda, Lillian was also one of the actresses to play the part of Beulah on radio. Randolph assumed the role in 1952 when Hattie McDaniel became ill; that same year, she received an "Angel" award from the Caballeros, an African-American businessmen's association, for her work in radio and television for 1951. She played Beulah until 1953, when Amanda took over from her.

In 1954, Randolph had her own daily radio show in Hollywood, where those involved in acting were featured. In the same year, she became the first African American on the board of directors for the Hollywood chapter of the American Federation of Television and Radio Artists.

In William Hanna and Joseph Barbera's Tom and Jerry cartoons at the Metro-Goldwyn-Mayer cartoon department during the 1940s and early 1950s, she was uncredited for voicing the housekeeper/maid character. The character's last appearance in the cartoons was in Push-Button Kitty in September 1952. MGM, Hanna-Barbera and Randolph had been under fire from the NAACP, which called the role a stereotype. Activists had been complaining about the maid character since 1949. The character was written out entirely. Many of these had a white actress (June Foray) redubbing the character in American TV broadcasts and in the DVD collections.

This was not the only time Randolph received criticism. In 1946, Ebony published a story critical of her role of Birdie on The Great Gildersleeve radio show. Randolph and Sam Moore, a scriptwriter on the program, provided a rebuttal to them in the magazine. Lillian Randolph believed these roles were not harmful to the image or opportunities of African-Americans. Her reasoning was that the roles themselves would not be discontinued, but the ethnicity of those in them would change.

In 1956, Randolph and her choir, along with fellow Amos 'n' Andy television show cast members Tim Moore, Alvin Childress, and Spencer Williams set off on a tour of the US as "The TV Stars of Amos 'n' Andy". However, CBS claimed it was an infringement of its rights to the show and its characters. The tour soon came to an end.

By 1958, Lillian, who started out as a blues singer, returned to music with a nightclub act.

Randolph was selected to play Bill Cosby's character's mother in his 1969 television series, The Bill Cosby Show. She later appeared in several featured roles on Sanford and Son and The Jeffersons in the 1970s. She also taught acting, singing and public speaking.

Randolph made a guest appearance on a 1972 episode of the sitcom Sanford and Son, entitled "Here Comes the Bride, There Goes the Bride" as Aunt Hazel, an in-law of the Fred Sanford (Redd Foxx) character who humorously gets a cake thrown in her face, after which Fred replies "Hazel, you never looked sweeter!". Her Amos 'n' Andy co-star, Alvin Childress, also had a role in this episode. She played Mabel in Jacqueline Susann's Once Is Not Enough (1975) and also appeared in the television miniseries, Roots (1977), Magic (1978) and The Onion Field (1979).

In March 1980, she was inducted into the Black Filmmakers Hall of Fame.

Randolph's daughter, Barbara, grew up watching her mother perform. At age eight, Barbara had already made her debut in Bright Road (1953) with Harry Belafonte and Dorothy Dandridge.

Choosing to adopt her mother's maiden name, Barbara Randolph appeared in her mother's nightclub acts, including with Steve Gibson and the Red Caps, and had a role in Guess Who's Coming to Dinner in 1967. She decided to follow a singing career.

== Death ==
Randolph died of cancer at Arcadia Methodist Hospital in Arcadia, California, in 1980. She is buried in Forest Lawn Memorial Park in Hollywood Hills, California. Her sister, Amanda, is buried beside her.

== Partial filmography ==
- Life Goes On (1938) – Cinthy
- The Duke Is Tops (1938) – Woman with Sciatica (uncredited)
- The Toy Wife (1938) – Black Nun with Rose (uncredited)
- Streets of New York (1939) – Judge's Maid (uncredited)
- Way Down South (1939) – Slave (uncredited)
- The Marx Brothers at the Circus (1939) – Black Woman - 'Swingali' (uncredited)
- Am I Guilty? (1940) – Mrs. Jones
- Barnyard Follies (1940) – Birdie (uncredited)
- Little Men (1940) – Asia
- One Big Mistake (1940), a featurette starring Dewey "Pigmeat" Markham
- Tom and Jerry (1940-1952) – housekeeper
- West Point Widow (1941) – Sophie
- Kiss the Boys Goodbye (1941) – Bethany Plantation Chorus Servant (uncredited)
- Gentleman from Dixie (1941) – Aunt Eppie
- Birth of the Blues (1941) – Dancing Woman (uncredited)
- All-American Co-Ed (1941) – Deborah, the Washwoman
- Mexican Spitfire Sees a Ghost (1942) – Hyacinth
- Hi, Neighbor (1942) – Birdie
- The Palm Beach Story (1942) – Maid on Train (uncredited)
- The Glass Key (1942) – Basement Club Entertainer (uncredited)
- The Great Gildersleeve (1942) – Birdie Lee Calkins
- No Time for Love (1943) – Hilda (uncredited)
- Happy Go Lucky (1943) – Tessie (uncredited)
- Hoosier Holiday (1943) – Birdie
- Gildersleeve on Broadway (1943) – Birdie
- Phantom Lady (1944) – Woman at Train Platform (uncredited)
- Up in Arms (1944) – Black Woman in Cable Car (uncredited)
- The Adventures of Mark Twain (1944) – Black Woman (uncredited)
- Gildersleeve's Ghost (1944) – Birdie, Gildersleeve's Housekeeper
- Three Little Sisters (1944) – Mabel
- A Song for Miss Julie (1945) – Eliza Henry
- Riverboat Rhythm (1946) – Azalea (uncredited)
- Child of Divorce (1946) – Carrie, the Maid
- It's a Wonderful Life (1946) – Annie
- The Hucksters (1947) – Violet (voice, uncredited)
- The Bachelor and the Bobby-Soxer (1947) – Bessie
- Sleep, My Love (1948) – Parkhurst's Maid (uncredited)
- Let's Live a Little (1948) – Sarah (uncredited)
- Once More, My Darling (1949) – Mamie
- Dear Brat (1951) – Dora
- That's My Boy (1951) – May, Maid
- Bend of the River (1952) – Aunt Tildy (uncredited)
- Hush...Hush, Sweet Charlotte (1964) – Cleaning Woman
- The Great White Hope (1970) – Housekeeper (uncredited)
- How to Seduce a Woman (1974) – Matilda
- Rafferty and the Gold Dust Twins (1975) – Elderly Woman Driver
- The Wild McCullochs (1975) – Missy
- Jacqueline Susann's Once Is Not Enough (1975) – Mabel
- The World Through the Eyes of Children (1975) – Susan
- Jennifer (1978) – Martha
- Magic (1978) – Sadie
- The Onion Field (1979) – Nana, Jimmy's Grandmother (final film role)
