= Earle Ross =

American actor (1888–1961)

- Publicity Photo of Earle Ross
- Born: March 29, 1888; Chicago, U.S.
- Died: May 21, 1961 (aged 73); North Hollywood, California, U.S.

Earle Ross (March 29, 1888 – May 21, 1961) was an American radio and film actor.

While in school he became interested in dramatics and was usually cast as a villain or an old man because of his unusual voice characteristics. In 1908 he worked with Colonel Bill Selig in his first 5-reel movie film The Holy Cross. In 1912, he ventured to the East Coast and worked on Broadway in such shows as Where the Trail Divides and Cost of Living. From there, he started his own chain of theaters but went broke in the Wall Street crash of 1929.

Actor Wilton Lackaye suggested a career on stage for Ross after he saw him perform in a high school play. After making his professional debut on stage, Ross acted in The Holy City (1908), "the first American five-reel film". Ross headed the Earle Ross Players at the Warrington Theatre in Oak Park, Illinois, beginning in 1927. From 1929 to 1932, he led a school of fine arts in Oak Park. After working as a producer, Ross returned to acting in 1935 with the Olvera Street Theater.

Ross became a radio broadcast pioneer and had his own show, The Earle Ross Theater of the Air and also starred in Inspector Post, a continuing radio drama. In 1936 he appeared in various films such as Cavalry, Stormy Trails, and Riders of the Whistling Skull.

On Radio, Ross portrayed Judge Horace Hooker on The Great Gildersleeve and Howie MacBrayer on Point Sublime.

Earle Ross died of cancer at age 73 on May 21, 1961.
