= Louise Erickson (actress) =

American actress (1928–2019)

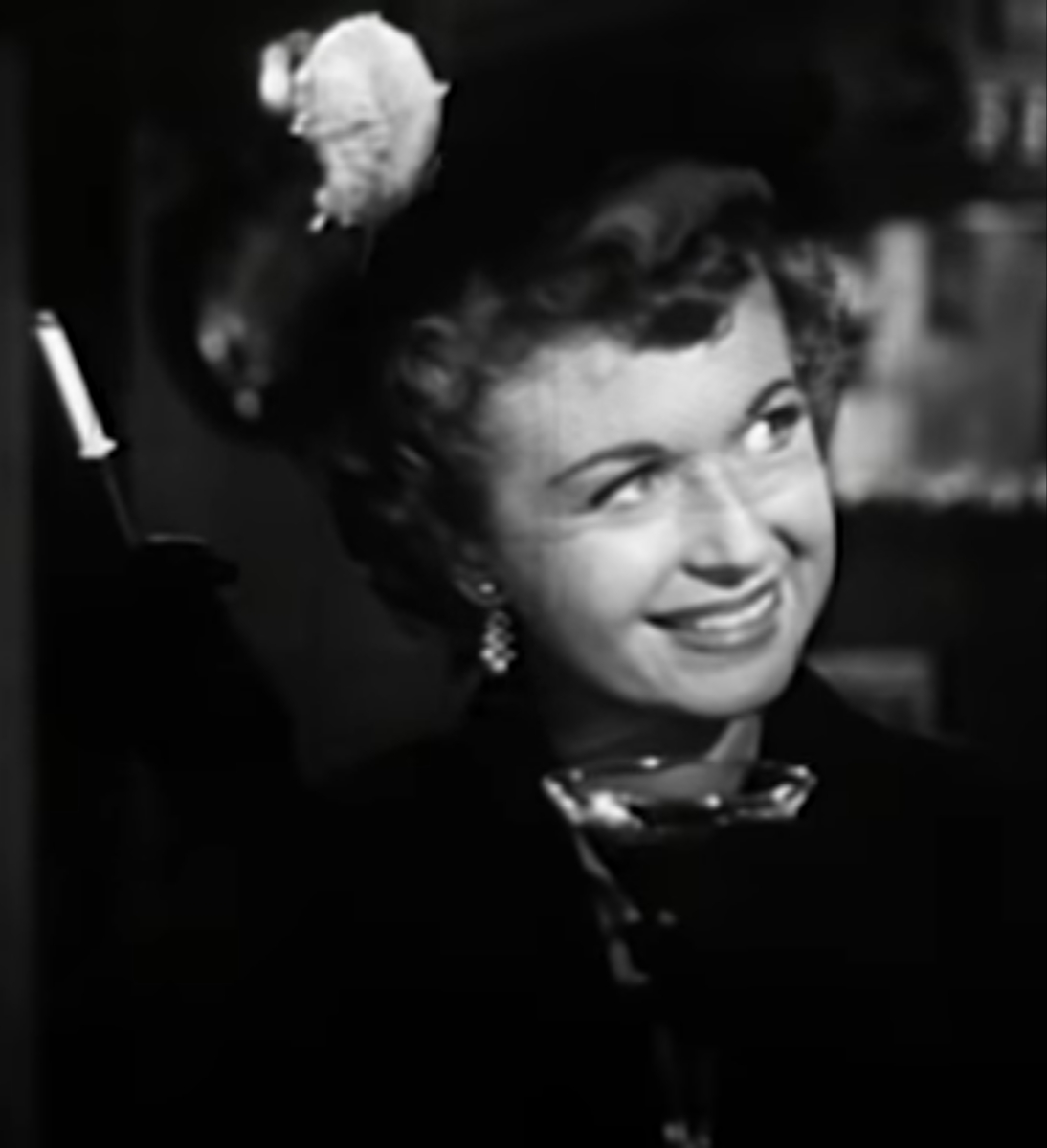
- Erickson in Three Husbands (1951)
- Born: February 28, 1928; Oakland, California, U.S.
- Died: March 18, 2019 (aged 91); New York City, New York, U.S.
- Occupation: Actress
- Years active: 1942–2009
- Spouse: Ben Gazzara (m. 1951; div. 1957)

Louise Erickson (February 28, 1928 – March 18, 2019) was an American radio and film actress.

== Personal life ==
Erickson was born in Oakland, California. She attended Occidental College in Los Angeles, California.

She was married to actor Ben Gazzara from 1951 until their divorce in 1957.

== Career ==
Erickson began performing on radio at age 6, acting in broadcasts of fairy tales. She also appeared in Drama of Youth and was Emmy Lou on The Adventures of Ozzie and Harriet.

As an actress, she was most active on radio series. Erickson is best known for starring in the 1940s radio teenage sitcom A Date with Judy in the title role, and for the role of Marjorie in The Great Gildersleeve. She also played the girl friend, Mildred, in Meet Corliss Archer, another teenage situation comedy.

She was the third actress to play bobby soxer Judy on the long running radio series that debuted in 1941. Erickson had joined the cast in 1942 as Mitzi, Judy's friend. The following year, she took over the title character from Ann Gillis and would remain in the role for the rest of the series run, which ended in 1950.

Erickson also played Babs on The Life of Riley, Betty on The Alan Young Show and Janice on the radio comedy Granby's Green Acres. She made only a handful of motion pictures.

In 1957, Erickson played Tina in the Broadway production of A Hole in the Head.

In 2009, she retired from acting.

== Filmography ==
- Rosie the Riveter – Mabel Prouty (1944)
- Meet Miss Bobby Socks – Susan Tyrell (1944)
- Unusual Occupations (documentary short) – Herself (1944)
- Three Husbands – Matilda Clegg (1950)

=== Radio ===
- Drama of Youth
- The Adventures of Ozzie and Harriet (Emmy Lou)
- A Date with Judy – Mitzi (1942), Judy (1943–1950)
- Meet Corliss Archer – Mildred
- The Great Gildersleeve – Marjorie Forrester (1944–1948)
- The Life of Riley – Babs (1947–1948)
- The Alan Young Show – Betty (1949)
- Cloak and Dagger (Episode: "Operation Sellout") – Marie (1950)
- Granby's Green Acres – Janice (1950)

=== Theatre ===
- A Hole in the Head – Tina (1957)
