= Walter Tetley =

American voice actor (1915–1975)

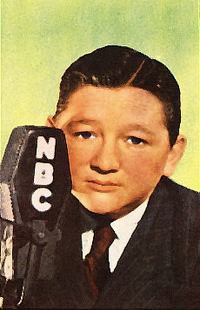
- Tetley c. 1940s
- Born: Walter Campbell Tetzlaff; June 2, 1915; Manhattan, New York City, U.S.
- Died: September 4, 1975 (aged 60); Los Angeles, California, U.S.
- Occupation: Actor
- Years active: 1936–1973

Walter Tetley (born Walter Campbell Tetzlaff; June 2, 1915 – September 4, 1975) was an American actor specializing in performing child roles during radio's classic era. He had regular roles as Leroy Forrester on The Great Gildersleeve and Julius Abbruzzio on The Phil Harris-Alice Faye Show, as well as continuing as a voice-over artist in animated cartoons, commercials, and spoken-word record albums. He is perhaps best known as the voice of Sherman in the Jay Ward-Bill Scott Mr. Peabody TV cartoons.

== Career ==
Tetley first appeared on The NBC Children's Hour in 1930, singing Scottish songs. His foray into voices for theatrical cartoons began in 1936, as the voice of Felix the Cat in three of Van Beuren's Rainbow Parade cartoon shorts: The Goose That Laid the Golden Egg, Neptune Nonsense, and Bold King Cole. The latter short starts with Tetley singing "Nature and Me", showcasing his singing abilities.

In the late 1930s, he was often featured in Fred Allen's Town Hall Tonight. When Allen took his cast to Hollywood to film Love Thy Neighbor in 1940, Tetley decided to stay on the west coast, working on several radio shows, including The Great Gildersleeve, on which he portrayed Gildy's nephew Leroy until the show's end in 1958.

In the late 1940s, he was the voice of Andy Panda in the Walter Lantz Productions cartoons distributed by Universal Pictures.

In 1946, Tetley supplied the voice of the electric utility mascot Reddy Kilowatt in the short film Reddy Made Magic, produced by Lantz with Reddy Kilowatt creator Ashton B. Collins, Sr.; Tetley also performed the film's theme song. In 1959 he reprised the role in a John Sutherland-produced remake called The Mighty Atom.

In the late 1950s and early 1960s, Walter would become familiar to a new generation as the voice of Sherman, the nerdy, freckled, bespectacled boy sidekick of time-traveling dog genius Mr. Peabody, in the "Peabody's Improbable History" segments of Jay Ward's Rocky and His Friends (also known as The Bullwinkle Show), which made its debut in 1959.

Tetley worked for Capitol Records in the 1950s, providing an array of juvenile voices for the label's spoken-word and comedy albums, including Stan Freberg Presents the United States of America Volume One: The Early Years (1961). His Gildersleeve co-star, Harold Peary, had made three albums for Capitol a decade earlier, telling children's stories Gildersleeve-style.

In 1973, Tetley made an appearance on Rod Serling's radio series The Zero Hour. He could be heard in the "Princess Stakes Murder" episodes beginning the week of November 19.

"The Sheriff of Fetterman's Crossing", an episode of Serling's 1965 TV series The Loner, featured guest star Allan Sherman as a character named Walton Peterson Tetley.

== Voice and appearance ==
For his entire adult life, Tetley had the voice and appearance of a preteen boy, which led to him largely taking voice roles for young boys. The exact cause was never confirmed – while co-star Bill Scott half-jokingly claimed that Tetley had been castrated, it is also possible that he had Kallmann syndrome. Whatever the cause, his unusual situation would allow him to hold roles for young boys far longer than actual boys of that age could before their voices would lower due to puberty.

== Death ==
In 1971, Tetley was seriously injured in a motorcycle accident and used a wheelchair for the rest of his life. He died at the age of 60 on September 4, 1975, having never fully recovered from his injuries. His interment was in Chatsworth's Oakwood Memorial Park.

== Filmography ==
=== Live-action ===
- A Trip to Paris (1938) – Page Boy
- Lord Jeff (1938) – Tommy Thrums
- Sons of the Legion (1938) – Shifty
- King of Alcatraz (1938) – Newsboy
- Prairie Moon (1938) – Clarence "Nails" Barton
- Boy Slaves (1939) – Pee Wee
- You Can't Cheat an Honest Man (1939) – Boy with Candy Cane (uncredited)
- The Spirit of Culver (1939) – Hank
- The Family Next Door (1939) – Boy (uncredited)
- They Shall Have Music (1939) – Rocks Mulligan
- First Love (1939) – Willie, Country Club Page (uncredited)
- Tower of London (1939) – Chimney Sweep
- Emergency Squad (1940) – Matt (uncredited)
- Framed (1940) – Murphy (uncredited)
- My Son, My Son! (1940) – Newsboy (uncredited)
- Tom Brown's School Days (1940) – Student (uncredited)
- Military Academy (1940) – Cadet Blackburn
- Under Texas Skies (1940) – Theodore
- The Villain Still Pursued Her (1940) – Telegram Boy (uncredited)
- A Little Bit of Heaven (1940) – Boy in Crowd (uncredited)
- Let's Make Music (1941) – Eddie
- Ride, Kelly, Ride (1941) – Jockey (uncredited)
- Horror Island (1941) – Delivery Boy (uncredited)
- The Devil and Miss Jones (1941) – Stock Boy
- Out of the Fog (1941) – Buddy
- It Started with Eve (1941) – Messenger (uncredited)
- Sing Your Worries Away (1942) – Messenger Boy with Telegram (uncredited)
- Broadway (1942) – Western Union Messenger (uncredited)
- The Pride of the Yankees (1942) – Cake Delivery Boy (uncredited)
- Invisible Agent (1942) – Newsboy (uncredited)
- A Yank at Eton (1942) – Newsboy (uncredited)
- Moonlight in Havana (1942) – Newsboy (uncredited)
- Thunder Birds: Soldiers of the Air (1942) – Messenger Boy
- Who Done it? (1942) – Elevator Operator (uncredited)
- Random Harvest (1942) – Call Boy (uncredited)
- The Gorilla Man (1943) – Sammy
- It Comes Up Love (1943) – Delivery Boy (uncredited)
- Henry Aldrich Gets Glamour (1943) – Classroom Student (uncredited)
- Gildersleeve on Broadway (1943) – The Bellhop (uncredited)
- Mystery Broadcast (1943) – Page Boy (uncredited)
- The Lodger (1944) – Call Boy
- Her Primitive Man (1944) – Bellhop (uncredited)
- Pin Up Girl (1944) – Messenger Boy (uncredited)
- Follow the Boys (1944) – Soldier (uncredited)
- Casanova Brown (1944) – Florist's Assistant (uncredited)
- Bowery to Broadway (1944) – Attendant (uncredited)
- I'll Remember April (1945) – Mail Boy (uncredited)
- It's in the Bag! (1945) – 2nd Elevator Operator (uncredited)
- Molly and Me (1945) – Grocery Boy
- Red Garters (1954) – Gun-toting Kid (voice, uncredited)

=== Animation ===
- The Goose That Laid the Golden Egg (1936) – Felix the Cat
- Neptune Nonsense (1936) – Felix the Cat
- Bold King Cole (1936) – Felix the Cat
- Adventures of Tom Thumb Jr. (1940) – Tom Thumb Jr.
- The Haunted Mouse (1941) – Mouse
- The Painter and the Pointer (1944) – Andy Panda (uncredited)
- Crow Crazy (1945) – Andy Panda (uncredited)
- Apple Andy (1946) – Andy Panda (uncredited)
- Mousie Comes Home (1946) – Andy Panda (uncredited)
- The Wacky Weed (1946) – Andy Panda, Glads (uncredited)
- Banquet Busters (1948) – Andy Panda, Mouse (uncredited)
- Playful Pelican (1948) – Andy Panda (uncredited)
- Dog Tax Dodgers (1948) – Andy Panda (uncredited)
- Scrappy Birthday (1948) – Andy Panda (uncredited)
- Georgie and the Dragon (1951) – Georgie (uncredited)
- The Woody Woodpecker Show (1957) – Andy Panda
- The Best of Mr. Peabody & Sherman (1959) – Sherman
- Rocky and His Friends (1959–1961) – Sherman, Joey Tell, Girl
- The Bullwinkle Show (1961–1963) – Sherman, Joey Tell, Girl
- The Dudley Do-Right Show (1969) – Additional voices
- A Christmas Story (1972) – Timmy
