= Richard LeGrand =

American radio actor (1882–1963)

- Born: August 29, 1882; Portland, Oregon, U.S.
- Died: June 29, 1963 (aged 80); Los Angeles, California, U.S.
- Occupation: Actor
- Children: Dick LeGrand

Richard LeGrand (August 29, 1882 – June 29, 1963) was an American actor who was best known for his comedy characters on radio. His last name is also seen as Le Grand.

== Early years ==
The son of a merchant, LeGrand was born in Portland, Oregon, and attended schools there. Participation in high school plays changed his career interest from engineering to acting.

== Career ==
LeGrand was backstage working the artificial snow when he made his stage debut to substitute for a missing actor. He continued in theater, doing dramas, musical comedies, tent shows and vaudeville. LeGrand appeared as a variety of dialect characters.

LeGrand worked on radio as early as 1929, portraying Professor Knicklebine on School Days and announcing for the Pacific Vagabonds program. He was a comedy favorite as Peavey the Druggist on The Great Gildersleeve. His signature line to end any conversation was "Well now, I wouldn't say that!" As a member of the men's social group "The Jolly Boys", he would try to get the fellows to start singing "There Is a Tavern in the Town", but was very rarely successful. In 1949, he was a member of the cast of Summerfield Bandstand, a variety program that was the summer replacement for The Great Gildersleeve. In February 1951, the National Association of Retail Druggists named Peavey "America's Favorite Neighborhood Druggist" in recognition that coincided with LeGrand's 50th anniversary in show business.

He later was a regular on Fibber McGee and Molly as Ole, the Elk's Club janitor, beginning February 15, 1949 just as that show began its decline, and appeared as Phil Harris' father on the Phil Harris Alice Faye Show (using the Peavey voice) from March 1954 until the end of that series in May of that year.

He also performed roles on One Man's Family and the Hollywood version of I Love a Mystery. LeGrand also portrayed Peavey in three of the Great Gildersleeve movies. His largest part, almost a co-star role, was in Gildersleeve on Broadway in 1943.

== Personal life ==
LeGrand was married to Alice Gertrude (Evans) Nixon. They were divorced in 1947.
