= Constantin Bakaleinikoff =

Russian and American composer (1896–1966)

Headshot c. 1926

Constantin Bakaleinikoff (born Konstantin Romanovich Bakaleinikov; Russian: Константин Романович Бакалейников; 26 April 1896 – 3 September 1966) was a Russian and American composer.

== Life and career ==
Bakaleinikoff was from a large musical family. His brothers were Nikolai Bakaleinikov (flautist, composer and conductor), Vladimir Bakaleinikov (violist, composer and conductor), and Mikhail (Mischa) Bakaleinikov (composer). He studied at the Moscow Conservatory. Following the Bolshevik Revolution, he migrated to the United States of America with his brother, Mischa. Constantin Bakaleinikoff (pronounced back-a-LAIN-a-koff) worked as a conductor for the Los Angeles Philharmonic before beginning his Hollywood career as a freelance composer.

At the 1927 premiere of Director Cecil B. DeMille's The King of Kings at Hollywood's famed Grauman's Chinese Theatre, which was hosted by D.W. Griffith and speakers DeMille and Mary Pickford, the audience was treated to a concert of film music "classics" conducted by Constantin Bakaleinikoff. With the arrival of sound, the Bakaleinikoff brothers became studio maestros. Mischa joined Columbia Pictures, while Constantin became a musical director at Paramount Pictures, followed by MGM. Constantin also worked briefly at Columbia, and later for independent Grand National Pictures.

In 1935, Bakaleinikoff participated in making the earliest dance film, Spring Night. He conducted Joseph Achron's score for this first experimental ballet film, which featured the choreography and dancing of David Lichine. This pioneering film, which emerged from the Diaghilev sphere of influence, was produced by Adolf Zuckor. The camera work was by George Clemens, who went on to do the cinematography for the Twilight Zone and other popular television shows. He received his first Academy Award nomination for scoring the James Cagney feature, Something to Sing About.

Later, Bakaleinikoff became the senior music director at RKO Radio Pictures, where he spent most of his motion picture career. He earned Academy Award nominations for his work on The Fallen Sparrow, Higher and Higher, and None But the Lonely Heart. For Alfred Hitchcock's Notorious (1946), starring Cary Grant and Ingrid Bergman, he conducted the original score by composer Roy Webb, one that complements the director's elements of suspense and danger throughout the film.

Bakaleinikoff, who was always billed as "C. Bakaleinikoff", appeared on camera as himself in RKO's backstage musical Ding Dong Williams (filmed 1945, released in April 1946). He remained at RKO until the studio folded in 1956. He was married to silent film actress Fritzi Ridgeway. He donated his time and talent in the late 1950s in mentoring and conducting the Burbank Youth Symphony.

He died in 1966, aged 70, and was buried at Forest Lawn Memorial Park (Glendale).

== Soundtracks ==
- Spring Night (1935) David Lichine, Nana Gollner
- Something to Sing About (1936) Grand National Pictures
  - James Cagney
- The Story of Vernon and Irene Castle (1939) RKO Radio Pictures
  - Fred Astaire, Ginger Rogers
- The Big Street (1942) RKO
  - Henry Fonda, Lucille Ball
- Stage Door Canteen (1943) RKO
  - All-star cast
- Tarzan's Desert Mystery (1943) RKO
  - Johnny Weissmuller, Nancy Kelly, Johnny Sheffield
- Higher and Higher (1943) RKO
  - "I Couldn't Sleep a Wink Last Night" - Frank Sinatra, Stanley Wrightsman (Piano), The RKO Radio Studio Orchestra, Constantin Bakaleinikoff
  - "The Music Stopped" - Frank Sinatra, The RKO Radio Studio Orchestra, Constantin Bakaleinikoff
  - "I Saw You First" - Frank Sinatra, Marcy McGuire, The RKO Radio Studio Orchestra, Constantin Bakaleinikoff
  - "A Lovely Way to Spend an Evening" (With Orchestra) - Frank Sinatra, The RKO Radio Studio Orchestra, Constantin Bakaleinikoff
  - "A Lovely Way to Spend an Evening" (Piano & Vocal) - Frank Sinatra, Stanley Wrightsman (Piano)
  - "You're on Your Own" - Frank Sinatra, Dooley Wilson, Mel Tormé, Marcy McGuire, Michèle Morgan, Victor Borge, Cast, The RKO Radio Studio Orchestra, Constantin Bakaleinikoff
  - "You're on Your Own" (Reprise) - Frank Sinatra, The RKO Radio Studio Orchestra, Constantin Bakaleinikoff
  - "Finale: I Saw You First/A Lovely Way To Spend An Evening/The Music Stopped" - Frank Sinatra, Marcy McGuire, Barbara Hale, Chorus, The RKO Radio Studio Orchestra, Constantin Bakaleinikoff
- Step Lively (1944) RKO
  - "Come Out, Come Out, Wherever You Are" - Frank Sinatra, Gloria DeHaven, Chorus, The RKO Radio Studio Orchestra, Constantin Bakaleinikoff
  - "As Long as There's Music" - Frank Sinatra, The RKO Radio Studio Orchestra, Constantin Bakaleinikoff
  - "Where Does Love Begin?" - Frank Sinatra, Anne Jeffreys, The RKO Radio Studio Orchestra, Constantin Bakaleinikoff
  - "Some Other Time" - Frank Sinatra, The RKO Radio Studio Orchestra, Constantin Bakaleinikoff
  - "Some Other Time" (Duet Version) - Frank Sinatra, Gloria DeHaven, The RKO Radio Studio Orchestra, Constantin Bakaleinikoff
  - "And Then You Kissed Me" (Outtake) - Frank Sinatra, The RKO Radio Studio Orchestra, Constantin Bakaleinikoff
  - "Finale: As Long as There's Music/Some Other Time/As Long As There's Music/Where Does Love Begin?" - Frank Sinatra, Gloria DeHaven, George Murphy, Chorus, RKO Radio Studio Orchestra, C. Bakaleinikoff
- Tall in the Saddle (1944) RKO
  - John Wayne
- Show Business (1944) RKO
  - Eddie Cantor, Joan Davis, Nancy Kelly, Constance Moore, George Murphy
- Murder, My Sweet (1944) RKO
  - Dick Powell, Claire Trevor
- Back to Bataan (1945) RKO
  - John Wayne, Anthony Quinn
- Dick Tracy vs. Cueball (1946) RKO
  - Morgan Conway, Anne Jeffreys
- The Spiral Staircase (1946) RKO
  - Dorothy McGuire, Ethel Barrymore, Rhonda Fleming
- Notorious (1946) RKO
  - Cary Grant, Ingrid Bergman
- Ding Dong Williams (1946) RKO
  - "Piano Concerto in A Minor, Opus 16" - Played by the RKO studio orchestra conducted by C. Bakaleinikoff with prodigy Richard Korbel at the piano
- Born to Kill (1947) RKO
  - Lawrence Tierney, Claire Trevor
- Out of the Past (1947) RKO
  - Robert Mitchum, Jane Greer
- Mourning Becomes Electra (1947) RKO
  - Rosalind Russell, Michael Redgrave
- The Bachelor and the Bobby-Soxer (1947) RKO
  - Cary Grant, Myrna Loy, Shirley Temple
- Tycoon (1947) RKO
  - John Wayne, Laraine Day
- Crossfire (1947) RKO
  - Robert Young, Robert Mitchum
- I Remember Mama (1948) RKO
  - Irene Dunne
- Mr. Blandings Builds His Dream House (1948) RKO
  - Cary Grant, Myrna Loy
- The Boy with Green Hair (1948) RKO
  - Pat O'Brien, Robert Ryan, Barbara Hale, Dean Stockwell
- The Man on the Eiffel Tower (1949) RKO
  - Charles Laughton, Burgess Meredith
- The Set Up (1949) RKO
  - Robert Ryan
- Mighty Joe Young (1949) RKO
  - Terry Moore, Ben Johnson
- She Wore a Yellow Ribbon (1949) RKO
  - John Wayne
- Armored Car Robbery (1950) RKO
  - Charles MacGraw
- Flying Leathernecks (1951) RKO
  - John Wayne
- Double Dynamite (1951) RKO
  - "It's Only Money" - Frank Sinatra, Groucho Marx, The RKO Radio Studio Orchestra, Constantin Bakaleinikoff
  - "Kisses And Tears" - Frank Sinatra, Jane Russell, The RKO Radio Studio Orchestra, Constantin Bakaleinikoff
  - "Finale: It's Only Money" - Frank Sinatra, Groucho Marx, Jane Russell, The RKO Radio Studio Orchestra, Constantin Bakaleinikoff
- Macao (1952) RKO
  - Robert Mitchum, Jane Russell
- Clash by Night (1952) RKO
  - Barbara Stanwyck, Robert Ryan, Marilyn Monroe
- The Hitch-Hiker (1953) RKO
  - Edmond O'Brien, Frank Lovejoy
- Susan Slept Here (1954) RKO
  - Dick Powell, Debbie Reynolds
- The Conqueror (1956) RKO
  - John Wayne, Susan Hayward
- The Bachelor Party (1957) United Artists
  - Carolyn Jones, Don Murray, E.G. Marshall, Jack Warden
- St. Louis Blues (1958) Paramount
  - "Saint Louis Blues" - Performed by Nat 'King' Cole and Pearl Bailey

Later sung by Eartha Kitt, then Nat 'King' Cole, with orchestra conducted on-screen by C. Bakaleinikoff
