= I Yust Go Nuts at Christmas =

Single by Yogi Yorgesson with The Johnny Duffy Trio
- B-side: "Yingle Bells"
- Released: November 1949
- Recorded: 1949
- Genre: Christmas; novelty
- Length: 3:12
- Label: Capitol 57-781
- Songwriter(s): Harry Stewart

"I Yust Go Nuts at Christmas" is a 1949 Christmas novelty song and monologue written and performed by Harry Stewart as fictional Swede "Yogi Yorgesson". Stewart was backed by the Johnny Duffy Trio on the song.

== Synopsis ==
The song is made of two parts. The first is a short musical number (in thirty-two-bar form) in which Yogi shops for his wife and, considering buying a nightgown for his wife but not knowing her size, opts to buy her a carpet sweeper as his gift to her. The second is a parody of the poem "A Visit from Saint Nicholas." The spoken monologue begins with a peaceful house on Christmas Eve as Yogi sneaks off to the local bar; instead of staying to his original plan of drinking a single beer, he gets caught in the Christmas spirit and binge-drinks a dozen Tom & Jerrys.

Yogi comes home, seriously drunk, and gets too little sleep before Christmas morning arrives and the children wake him up. The severely hung-over Yogi must not only cope with his rambunctious children, but both his own relatives and his wife's, who do not get along with each other but nevertheless both visit the house for Christmas dinner. The in-laws quickly get drawn into an argument that soon escalates into violence; as Gabriel Heatter's voice is heard reciting the annunciation to the shepherds preaching peace and good will, "just at that moment, someone slugs Uncle Ben." The monologue ends with the fight spilling out of the house and Yogi grateful that Christmas only comes once a year. The song ends with a short eight-bar verse.

Throughout the song, a mock Scandinavian dialect is used, with words beginning in "j" pronounced with a "y" sound (hence the spelling of the title), and "w" sounds pronounced as a "v".

== Chart performance ==
"I Yust Go Nuts at Christmas", backed with "Yingle Bells", peaked at #5 on Billboard's Best Sellers in Stores chart for the week after Christmas 1949.

== Cover versions ==
Farm broadcaster Orion Samuelson, himself of Norwegian descent, covered the song in the late 1960s with backing by the Uff Da Band. Other than some minor tweaks (a lower key and replacing Gabriel Heatter with Perry Como) it was almost identical to the original.

Stan Boreson and Doug Setterberg recorded the song as the title track to their 1968 Christmas album Stan and Doug Yust Go Nuts at Christmas, a Harry Stewart tribute album. This version replaces Heatter with Walter Cronkite and is more loose with the narration, with Setterberg slipping in retorts at certain points to Boreson's story.
