= Maida Heatter =

American food writer (1916–2019)

- Born: September 7, 1916; Baldwin, New York, U.S.
- Died: June 6, 2019 (aged 102); Miami Beach, Florida, U.S.
- Occupation: Cookbook author
- Spouses: David E. Evins; Ellis Gimbel Jr.; Ralph Daniels (until his death)
- Children: 1
- Parents: Sadie Hermalin Heatter; Gabriel Heatter
- Family: Merrill Heatter (cousin)

Maida Heatter (September 7, 1916 – June 6, 2019) was an American pastry chef and cookbook author who specialized in baking and desserts.

== Biography ==
Heatter was born in Baldwin, New York, the daughter of radio commentator Gabriel Heatter and Saidie Heatter (née Hermalin). She graduated from New York's Pratt Institute in fashion design and began a career as an illustrator of merchandising, then subsequently switching to jewellery design, and then finally becoming a baker and baking instructor.

Her career as a professional cookbook author began when her skills in dessert making caught the attention of Craig Claiborne, a former food section editor of the New York Times. In part through his numerous endorsements for her and his suggestion to her to write her own cookbook, Heatter began her decades-long career in teaching baking and writing cookbooks.

The quality of her recipes caught the attention of many prominent figures in the trade of cooking and baking, garnering praise from numerous celebrity and media sources. Heatter's cookbooks have been the recipient of three James Beard Foundation Awards, and she herself was inducted into the Who's Who of Food & Beverage in America in 1988. She was also inducted into the Chocolatier Magazine Hall of Fame.

== Personal life ==
Heatter was married three times. In 1940, she married shoe designer David E. Evins, who was also Jewish; they had one daughter before divorcing. In 1949, she married Ellis Gimbel Jr., grandson of Adam Gimbel and brother of Richard Gimbel. In 1966, she married Ralph Daniels (died 1994). Her only child, daughter Toni Evins, died in a glider accident in 1989. She turned 100 in September 2016 and died in June 2019 at the age of 102.

== Awards ==
- James Beard Foundation Awards
  - 1998 Cookbook Hall of Fame Maida Heatter's Book of Great Desserts
  - 1988 Who's Who of Food & Beverage in America
  - 1981 Single Subject Book Maida Heatter's Book of Great Chocolate Desserts
  - 1978 Specialty Book Maida Heatter's Book of Great Cookies
