= Stan Boreson =

American entertainer

- Born: May 5, 1925; Everett, Washington
- Died: January 27, 2017 (aged 91); Seattle, Washington

Stan Boreson (May 5, 1925 – January 27, 2017), the "King of Scandinavian Humor," was a Norwegian-American comedian, accordionist and singer from Everett, Washington. Boreson was an early local TV star in the Seattle area, with a career that included 12 years as the host of "King's Klubhouse" on KING-TV. In addition to his television show, Boreson was adept at musical parody and brought his “Scandahoovian” stylings to the genre. Throughout his career he released 16 albums. With Doug Setterberg, he formed a comedy duo Stan & Doug, and recorded comedy albums in the early 1970s.

== Early life ==
Born in Everett, Washington on May 5, 1925, as a grandson of Norwegian immigrants, Stanley Edward Boreson grew up steeped in Norwegian American culture.

At age 12, his mother enrolled him in guitar lessons, but at the suggestion of his Norwegian instructor, he switched to accordion. His musical talents began to grow as he started publicly performing.

While attending Everett High School, Boreson's cousin encouraged him to perform the 1939 hit Oh, Johnny, Oh, Johnny, Oh! during a pep rally. During the performance, his cousin translated the song into Norwegian to the delight of their classmates. According to Boreson, “I wasn’t nervous singing after that. My mother used to sing a lot. It just kind of came along naturally when I got a little self-confidence.”

After graduating in 1944, Boreson tried to enlist in the army, but instead joined the USO where he performed with other artists across Europe. Upon the end of the war, Boreson studied at the University of Washington where he majored in accounting and personnel management all while maintaining his interest in entertainment.

== Early career ==
In 1949, with television in the Northwest in its infancy, KING-TV program director, Lee Schulman, visited the university scouting for talent. Schulman hired Boreson as a co-star on the 15-minute show Campus Capers where his Scandahoovian humor and thick Norwegian accent began to develop, ‘Scandahoovian’ referring to a combination of Norwegian and Swedish cultures often referred to in a humorous context.

His humor was often compared to one of his contemporaries and influences, Yogi Yorgesson, for his use of Scandinavian dialect.

Boreson also put his musical talent to use in his next television endeavor, Two B's at the Keys which resulted in a recording with Linden Records.

== KING’s Klubhouse ==
After the musical accompaniment left his show in 1955, KING offered Boreson his very own show oriented at children. The show was instantly successful. The show aired 5 days a week and eventually became The Stan Boreson Show. Boreson was accompanied on the show by sidekick Doug Setterberg and companion No-Mo-Shun the Basset Hound.

KING's Klubhouse became known for Boreson's musical stylings with his accordion. Whenever he sang a song on air, he would introduce them as “songs my Uncle Torvald taught me.” These songs continued Boreson's tradition of Scandinavian humor, and were performed in a ridiculous thick Norwegian accent.

Among the songs from the show was its theme song.

Zero dachus, Mucho Crackus
Hallaballooza Bub
That’s the secret password that we
Use down at the club, and
Zero dachus, Mucho Crackus,
Hallaballooza fan
Means now you are a member of
KING’s TV club with Stan...

Boreson also created a cast of creative characters he played himself, many were inspired by his Norwegian-American childhood. Some of the characters included Pepita the Flea, Victor Rolla, the Old Timer and his horse Nel and Bozo the Clown, based on the cartoon of the same name.

During the success of the show in 1957, Boreson was invited to perform on the Lawrence Welk Show, and in 1959 he won the Children's Entertainer Award “For Outstanding Devotion to Wholesome Entertainment for All Children Everywhere.”

== Later career ==
Throughout the run of the show and after, Boreson continued recording musical parodies for several different labels, such as the parody of “Catch a Falling Star” called “Catch a Pickled Herring”. In 1967, The Stan Boreson Show ended its run. In the years that followed, Boreson continued recording and appeared several times on A Prairie Home Companion. He also performed for King Olav V of Norway. Boreson and his wife also founded Boreson Tours, which provided guided tours of destinations both in the United States and abroad. His last musical release was the 2007 single “I Just Don’t Look Good Naked Anymore” with an accompanying music video.

Boreson died in Seattle, Washington, of a stroke on January 27, 2017, at age 91, with his wife by his side.

== Legacy ==
Memories of Boreson's show remain with the baby boomers that grew up with him. According to TV personality Chuck Zink, “The children’s TV entertainers of America have a fantastic influence, and a fantastic responsibility,” shaping a generation of children in the infancy of television.

His impact on Norwegian-American culture was seen throughout his life. In 2005 King Harald V awarded Boreson St. Olav's Medal, a high honor in Norway. According to Garrison Keillor, Boreson was “one of the last great Scandinavian-dialect humorists.”

== Discography ==
- 1957 Yust Try To Sing-A-Long in Swedish
- 1959 Sing Cold, Cold Heart and Other Torch Songs
- 1960 Ay Yust Don't Give A Hoot
- 1961 Klubhouse Klassics
- 1962 Yust Yoking Around
- 1965 More Scandihoovian Hits
- 1966 Stan Boreson Fractures Christmas
- 1969 Honey/Little Green Apples And Other Swedish Smorgasbord
- 1970 Stan & Doug Yust Go Nuts at Christmas
- 1971 Stan & Doug Yust Go Country & Western
- 1972 Those Swedish Meatballs Stan & Doug Are At It Again
- 1980 Yust Tinkin' of Yogi
- 1982 The Scandinavian Hot-Shot
- 1997 The Stan Boreson Band
- 2001 Laughing It Up With Stan Boreson
- 2007 Just Don't Look Good Naked Anymore (single)
