= Dialect comedy =

American genre of ethnic humor shows

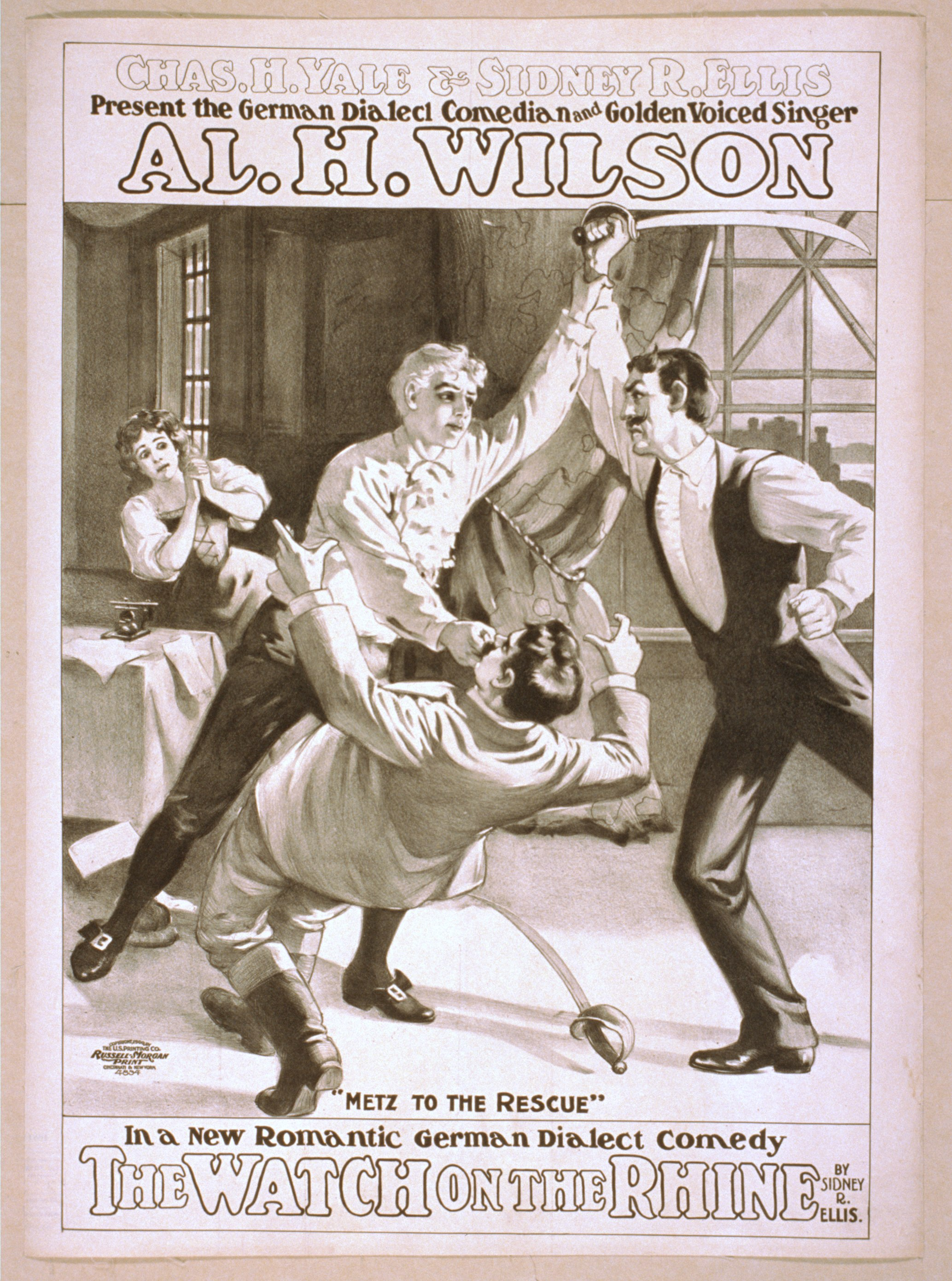
A 1900 poster for the German dialect comedy The Watch on the Rhine

Dialect comedies are a genre of radio (and later television) sitcoms that were popular between the 1920s and the 1950s. They relied on the exaggerated and highly stylized portrayal of stereotypes, usually based on ethnic humor. The term "dialect comedy" was coined by David Marc in his essay, Origins of the genre.

== Overview and history ==
The genre has its roots on the vaudeville stage and in the minstrel shows that became popular in the 19th century. The ethnicities of the actual actors portraying the dialects did not have to match the characters; while much Jewish dialect comedy was created and portrayed by actual Jews, other dialect comedies, such as those involving blackface, were often not.

Often overlooked in modern times were regional dialects that were not directly based on ethnic humor. Hillbilly humor was a somewhat common form of dialect comedy during the radio era, with shows such as Lum and Abner using the genre to full effect. Southerners (especially haughty aristocrats from the South and their distinctive accents) were another target of dialect comedy, with one of the most famous examples being fictional U.S. Senator Beauregard Claghorn from The Fred Allen Show.

=== Decline ===
Occasional use of dialect comedy continued even after political correctness led to the dramatic decline of its usage in the 1950s. Sara Berner, a noted dialect comic, noted in 1950: "Dialects are a natural part of American speech. And the sooner people stop being on the defensive about them, the sooner we can wipe out all that silly prejudice," also noting that "in all the years I’ve been doing them, I’ve never, not even once, got a nasty letter." She conceded: "You have to do them sympathetically. Otherwise you can cause trouble." José Jiménez, a fictional Bolivian immigrant who was created by non-Hispanic comedian Bill Dana, remained popular as a guest act well into the 1960s; Dana never intended the character to be offensive and killed him off in the late 1970s, complete with a mock funeral. Foreigner Latka Gravas was one of Andy Kaufman's most popular characters in the late 1970s and 1980s, while Bronson Pinchot regularly relied on dialect comedy for his characters Balki Bartokomous (Perfect Strangers), Jean-Luc Rieupeyroux (Step by Step) and the title character on Meego. The 1980s sitcom The Golden Girls included Scandinavian dialect humor in the form of Betty White's Rose Nylund character, a Norwegian-American who fit early 20th-century stereotypes of the good-hearted but dense Swede.

== Examples and subgenres ==
=== The Goldbergs ===
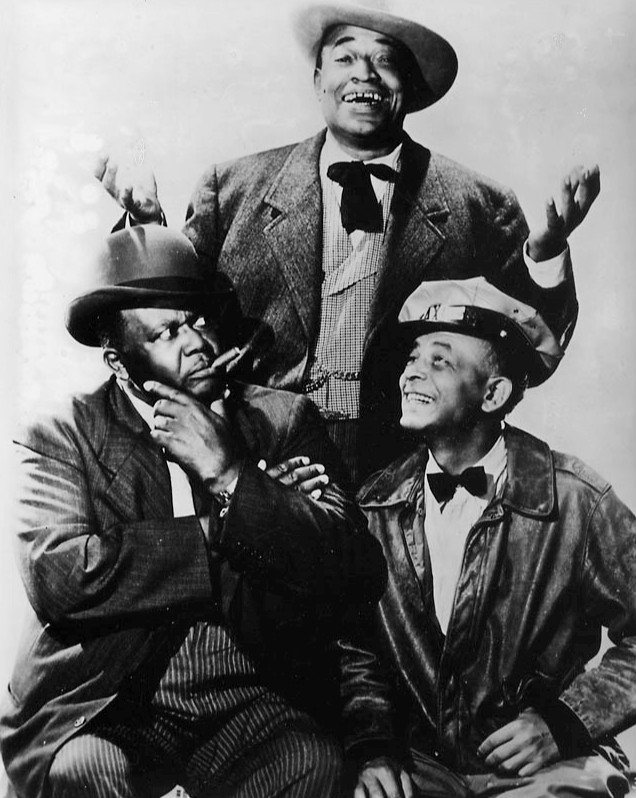
Cast of the Amos N Andy television show in 1951

One of the most notable dialect comedies was The Goldbergs, the brain child of creator/star Gertrude Berg about a Jewish family living in the Bronx. After its debut in 1929, the series had several incarnations in radio, television and a musical on Broadway. Berg continued to play the character of Molly Goldberg until 1955. In an article in the May 1936 issue of Radio Mirror, in a piece called "Ghetto guides the Goldbergs", writer Dan Wheeler describes Berg's "double life". Berg, the successful actress and business woman, takes the reporter to a Jewish Ghetto on New York's lower East Side, where she spends a few hours a week gabbing in Yiddish with the old Yentas of the neighborhood about their children and poring over the vegetable carts that line the streets. This is her inspiration for her characters; Berg emphasized both realism and being a positive role model in portraying the lead character as a Jewish mother.

=== Amos N Andy ===
Probably the most enduring program in this genre, Amos 'n' Andy was based firmly in the minstrel tradition. In 1928 two white performers, Freeman Gosden and Charles Correll, took their blackface act, Sam 'n' Henry, which they did not have the rights to and changed it to Amos 'n' Andy, which became one of the most popular shows of the time. In 1948 Variety proclaimed the show “a national habit, almost as familiar as radio itself.” Upon transitioning the show to television, Gosden and Correll took on the role of producers and hired a black cast including Alvin Childress (Amos), Spencer Williams (Andy) and Tim Moore (as King Fisher); Gosden and Correll had appeared as their characters in blackface on-screen in the 1930 talkie film Check and Double Check, which received poor reception. By the time of its final broadcast in 1960, the show had been renamed Amos N Andy Music Hall.

=== Life with Luigi ===
Life with Luigi premiered on CBS in 1948 and centered around Luigi Basco, an Italian immigrant living in Chicago. The title character was portrayed by J. Carrol Naish, an Irishman. Many of the plots were either about Luigi attending “citizenship classes” and the wacky immigrants he meets there or about his cranky landlord trying to convince Luigi to marry his overweight daughter. The TV version premiered in 1952 and was cancelled shortly after, in part due to the bumbling helpless portrayal of a character often referred to as “the little immigrant” who didn’t understand how banks work even though there were banks in Italy at the time.

=== Mama ===
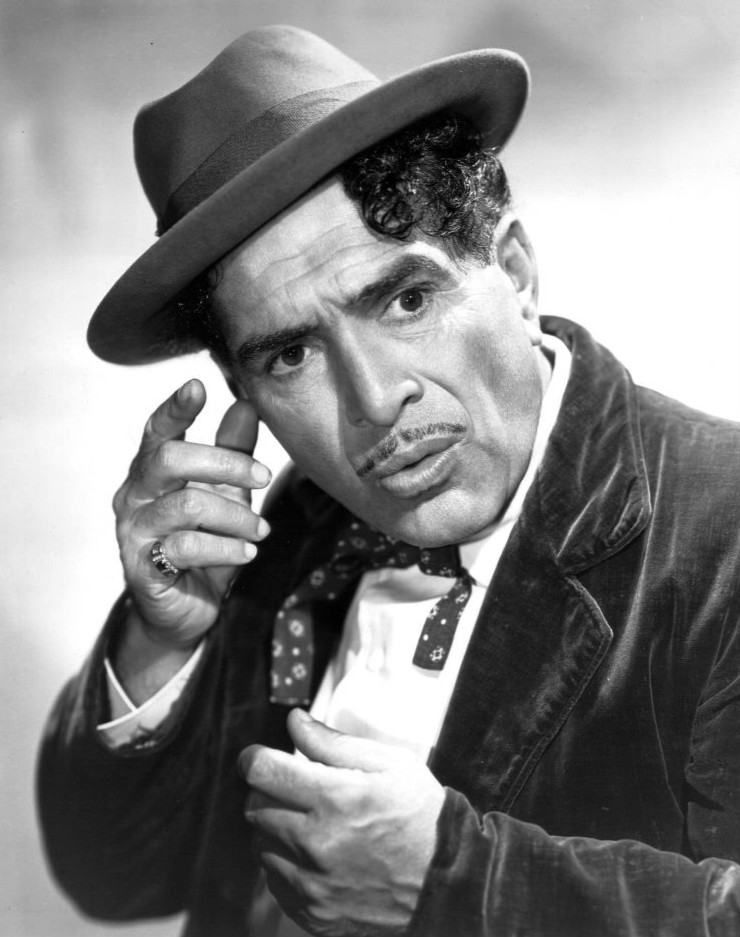
J. Carrol Naish in Life With Luigi 1950

Mama (alternately “I Remember Mama”) was a series about a Norwegian family living in San Francisco, CA starring Peggy Wood, Judson Laire and Rosemary Rice.

=== Beulah ===
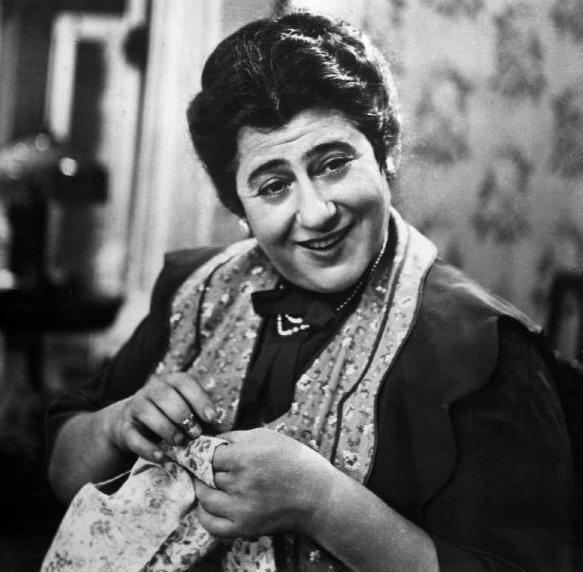
Gertrude Berg of The Goldbergs 1929

Beulah was a radio series on CBS from 1945–1954 and a TV show on ABC from 1950-1952. It was the first series to feature an African American woman in the main role. Beulah drew much of the same criticism from the black community as Amos N Andy. The show was criticized for its portrayal of the “Mammy” or the happy go lucky black servant who wanted nothing more from life than to serve white folks. When it first hit the radio waves, the character of Beulah was voiced by her creator, Marlin Hurt, a white male; the character was originally introduced nationwide as a supporting character on Fibber McGee and Molly before getting her own show. After Hurt's unexpected death in 1946, the character of Beulah was played by Bob Corley, another white man. In 1947, African American actress Hattie McDaniel took over, followed by two African American sisters Lillian Randolph and later Amanda Randolph. The TV version of Beulah was portrayed by Ethel Waters and Louise Beavers.

=== Jewish dialect comedy ===
Jewish performers such as George Burns, Jack Benny and Milton Berle had shows that were arguably forms of dialect comedy. Each of these comedians used cultural markers of Jewishness such as incorporating Yiddish words and phrases into their dialogue and referencing places that were known for being Jewish neighborhoods such as New York’s East side. Comedians like Berle and others had come out of the same vaudeville tradition as the minstrel performers and as such did their shows in a classic variety format which included characters who were often based on racial and ethnic stereotypes. As late as the 1990s, the work of Jerry Seinfeld was seen as having a distinctly New York Jewish flavor to it, which initially hindered his show Seinfeld (which later became a smash hit) from being picked up as a series.
