= Marlin Hurt =

American stage entertainer and radio actor

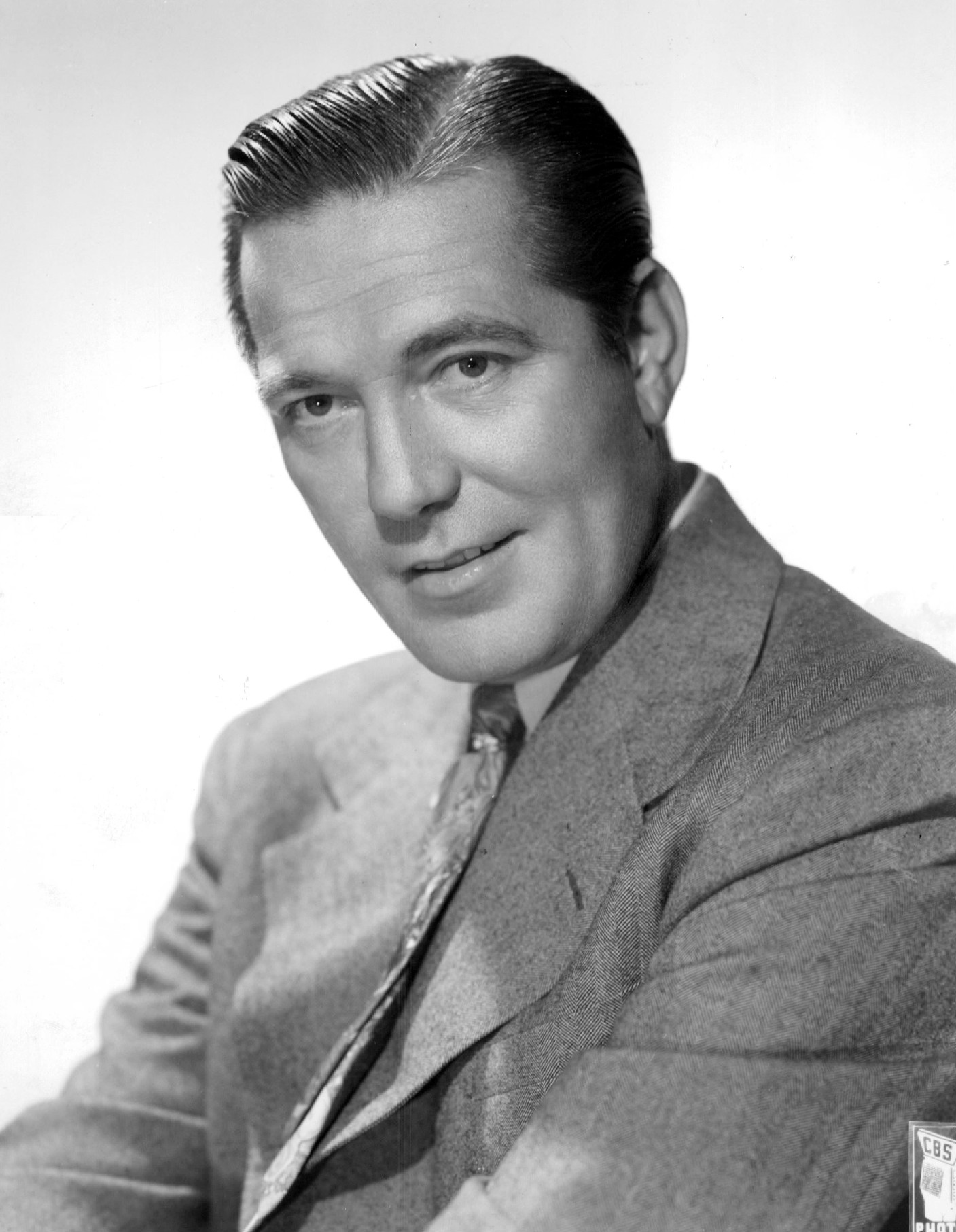
Marlin Hurt

Marlin Hurt (May 27, 1904/1905 – March 21, 1946) was an American stage entertainer and radio actor who was best known for originating the dialect comedy role of Beulah made famous on the Fibber McGee and Molly program and the first season of the Beulah radio series.

A saxophone player and vocalist, born in Du Quoin, Illinois, Hurt was a singer with the Vincent Lopez band and on records with Frank Trumbauer's jazz group before becoming part of a vocal trio with Bud and Gordon Vandover billed as "Tom, Dick, and Harry".

When the act was dissolved due to Bud Vandover's death in 1943, Hurt became a solo performer with a combination of saxophone and dialect humor.

== Beulah begins ==
Hurt's inspiration for the Beulah voice was an African-American woman named Mary who cooked for his family. While he was using this characterization on The Fred Brady Show, the summer 1943 replacement for The Bob Burns Show on NBC, Fibber McGee writer Don Quinn "discovered" Hurt for a widespread audience, and cast Hurt/Beulah as the McGees' maid on what was one of the highest-rated radio programs.

The widespread popularity of the Fibber McGee and Molly version of Hurt's character, based as much on the novelty of a white man portraying a black woman as the humor written for the character, soon warranted a spin-off series. In 1945, Beulah was spun off into her own radio show, The Marlin Hurt and Beulah Show; Hurt also played Beulah's boyfriend, Bill Jackson, in addition to his title roles.

The series was nearing the end of its first year when Hurt suddenly died of a heart attack, aged 40, bringing an abrupt end to the initial run. (Beulah would continue, but after a brief stint with Bob Corley as the lead, actual black women starred in the title role from 1947 onward.)

He has a star on the Hollywood Walk of Fame.
