= David Evins =

American shoe designer

- Born: 1907; Lithuania
- Died: 1991 (aged 83–84); New York City
- Occupation: Shoe designer
- Spouse(s): Maida Heatter, Marilyn Evins

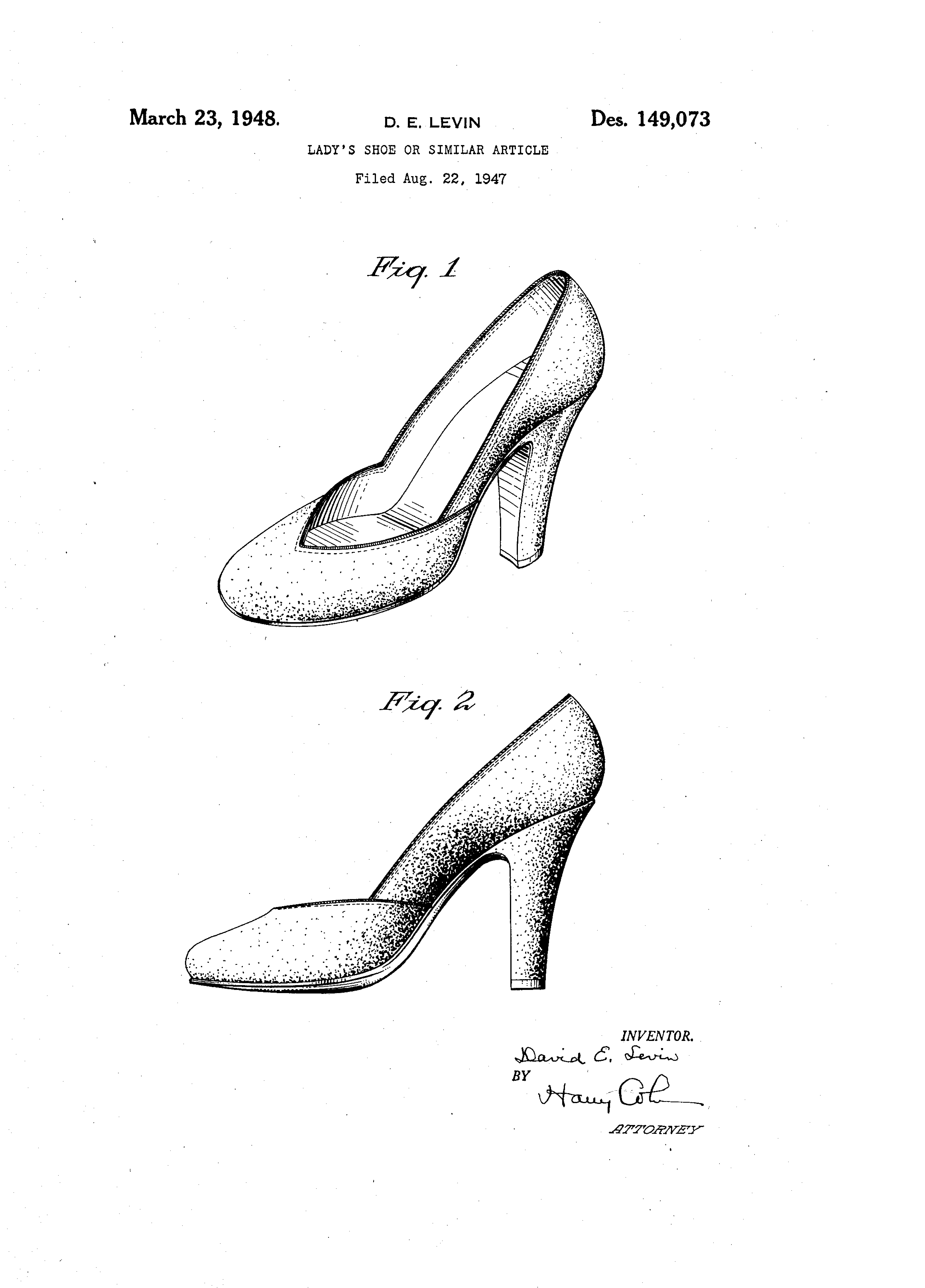
Evins's "shell" pump design, introduced in 1948, earned him a Coty Award and a Neiman Marcus Fashion Award.

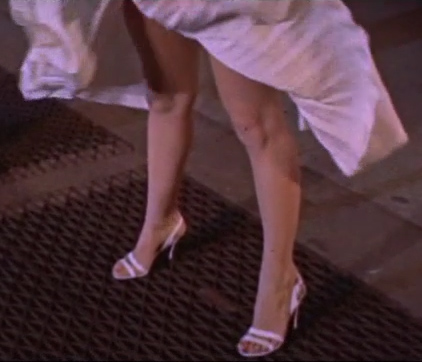
Evins designed the shoes worn by Marilyn Monroe in The Seven Year Itch (1955).

David Evins (1909, Lithuania – 1991, New York) was an American shoe designer considered as the "king of pumps" and the "dean of American shoe designers". He was in 1980 one of the founding members of the Council of Fashion Designers of America.

== Life ==
Evins was born on July 17, 1907, David Ephraim Levin in Yanislik, Lithuania. (Note: Evins himself claimed he was born in London in 1913.) Shortly after, his family moved to London where his father worked as a furrier. The family emigrated from England to the United States in 1920. Evins studied at the Pratt Institute in New York and started working as an illustrator for a footwear magazine. After working as a pattern maker for a few designers, he opened a factory in New York in 1947.

== Bibliography ==
- Nottingham, Leslie L. (2009). Well Heeled Lifestyles: the Shoes of David Evins and the Women Who Wore Them, 1947-1991 (Master of Arts in the History of Decorative Arts thesis). Corcoran College of Art + Design.
