= Gabriel Heatter =

American radio commentator

- Born: September 17, 1890; Brooklyn, New York, U.S.
- Died: March 30, 1972 (aged 81); Miami Beach, Florida, U.S.
- Spouse: Sadie Hermalin
- Children: Basil Heatter, Maida Heatter
- Family: Merrill Heatter (nephew)

Gabriel Heatter (September 17, 1890 – March 30, 1972) was an American radio commentator whose World War II-era sign-on, "There's good news tonight," became both his catchphrase and his caricature.

== Early life ==
The son of immigrants from Austria, Heatter was born in New York's Lower East Side and raised in Brooklyn. Young Heatter, who found school difficult but had a passion for reading, became a sidewalk-campaigner for William Randolph Hearst during Hearst's 1906 mayoral campaign. After his high school graduation, Heatter became a society reporter for the tiny weekly, The East New York Record, before joining the Brooklyn Daily Times, which led to his being offered a job with Hearst's New York Journal.

== To the air ==
In December 1932, he was invited by Donald Flamm, the owner of New York's WMCA, to debate a Socialist on radio, and when the Socialist was unable to make the date, Heatter had the program almost to himself. His performance impressed both Flamm and listeners. A few months later, he went to work for WOR, as a reporter and commentator. His audience expanded when in 1934, WOR became the flagship station of the newest network, Mutual Broadcasting.

Heatter covered the trial of Bruno Hauptmann, the man accused of kidnapping the infant son of aviator Charles Lindbergh. In 1936, he had to report on Hauptmann's execution. It was delayed, which forced Heatter to continue ad-libbing while he awaited word of when it would occur. His professionalism under pressure and his ability to keep the audience informed without resorting to sensationalism earned him critical praise.

On January 11, 1948, Heatter's Sunday night program changed format and title. As Brighter Tomorrow, the show had focused on "typical American success stories." In Behind the Front Page (the new title), a dramatic format was used to portray "current human interest stories." The weekly program was in addition to Heatter's 15 min nightly newscast, both on Mutual.

In December 1948 Heatter signed a five-year contract, effective January 1, 1949, with Mutual for radio and television services. The New York Times reported that Mutual was experimenting with several TV programs for which Heatter would be the "key personality". Heatter began hosting the Gabriel Heatter Opportunity Show, a talent showcase, on October 1, 1949, on Mutual.

== "There's good news tonight!" ==
During World War II, American forces sank a Japanese destroyer. Heatter opened his nightly commentary accordingly, "Good evening, everyone—there is good news tonight." The phrase sparked a small flurry of letters and calls, almost all in his favor.

Heatter was already well known for trying to find uplifting but true stories to feed his commentaries (he was especially known for a fondness for stories about heroic dogs). In April 1939, he gave the first national broadcast exposure to the burgeoning self-help group Alcoholics Anonymous. Reflecting that reputation, the critic and sometime rival Alexander Woollcott composed the doggerel couplet: "Disaster has no cheerier greeter/than gleeful, gloating Gabriel Heatter."

== Later life ==
Heatter remained with Mutual until, like many of the Depression and wartime broadcasters and commentators, his influence gave way to a newer generation of broadcasters, who made the transition to television or started in television and bypassed radio entirely. Heatter retired in 1961. (At least one other source says that Heatter announced his retirement in May 1965.)

In 1915, he married Sadie Hermalin, who died in 1966. After his wife's death, Heatter lived in retirement in Miami, Florida with his daughter until he died of pneumonia in 1972. He wrote a column for The Miami Beach Sun newspaper six days a week.

His daughter was the cookbook writer Maida Heatter. His granddaughter was the artist Toni Evans. His son is the novelist Basil Heatter. His nephew Merrill Heatter was a television writer and producer (Heatter-Quigley Productions).

== In popular culture ==
In 1944, Heatter appeared as himself uncredited in the wartime Cary Grant film Once Upon a Time. In 1950, he appeared as himself in the Ronald Colman comedy movie Champagne for Caesar. Heatter was also heard but not seen as one of four broadcast journalists portraying themselves in the 1951 film The Day the Earth Stood Still. Heatter is referred to in the recited portion of Yogi Yorgesson's 1949 comedy song "I Yust Go Nuts at Christmas." Jean Arthur's character in the 1948 film A Foreign Affair says, "I will [go to the General], and to the War Department, and to the President. And if that doesn't do it, I'll see Gabriel Heatter." Toni Morrison includes a reference to Gabriel Heatter in her novel Sula — Heatter’s program is one that Jude Greene (Nel’s husband) listens to (Sula, p. 105, 2004 publication edition). In 1948, Daffy Duck used Heatter's catchphrase "There's good news tonight!" in the cartoon short "The Stupor Salesman" after referring to a handgun as "Gabriel's heater." Also in 1948, the title of the second Casper the Friendly Ghost cartoon was "There's Good Boos To-Night", a play on the sign-on catchphrase. NBC Nightly News features a segment called "There's Good News Tonight", in reference to Heatter.
