= Harry Stewart =

American comedian and musician (1908–1956)

- Stewart, c. 1950
- Born: Harry Edward Skarbo; October 21, 1908; Tacoma, Washington, U.S.
- Died: May 20, 1956 (aged 47); Tonopah, Nevada, U.S.
- Occupations: Comedian, singer, songwriter
- Years active: 1927-1956
- Spouse: Gretchen
- Children: 2

Harry Stewart (October 21, 1908 – May 20, 1956), born Harry Skarbo, was an entertainer, singer, comedian, and songwriter. He was best known for his portrayal of Yogi Yorgesson, a comically exaggerated Swedish American.

== Biography ==
Harry Edward Skarbo was born in Tacoma, Washington, to Hans H. Skarbo (1878–1941) an immigrant from Norway, and Elsie (Gilbertson) Skarbo (1882– 1911) who was the daughter of Norwegian immigrants. After the death of his mother, he was adopted by the Stewart family. Growing up in the Proctor District, he attended Washington Grade School and Stadium High School in Tacoma.

In 1927, Stewart worked as an announcer, weather reporter, newsman and banjo player on KVI, a radio station that had recently started in Tacoma. Stewart developed the character of Yogi Yorgesson while appearing on the Al Pearce radio show from Fall, 1932, to 1937. He then began performing a comedy routine as Yogi in nightclubs. Yogi was originally a Hindu mystic from Stockholm, but in time his crystal ball act was abandoned as Yogi was transformed into an everyman; Stewart nonetheless deliberately tried to make Yorgesson more intelligent than the stereotype of the naive rubes that other Scandinavian dialect comedians were using.

Harry and his wife, Gretchen Ida (Sissell) Ross (1909–1998) moved to Chicago in 1939, where he became a script writer. He kept the Yorgesson character alive, touring occasionally. During World War II, Harry became part of the WBBM production staff in May, 1942. By December Yogi was performing for the station. This, in turn, led to Harry's first published work as a songwriter in 1946, when the King's Jesters recorded his song, "Humphrey, the Sweet Singing Pig," for Vogue Picture Records. Yogi Yorgesson then attracted the attention of a local record company, S&G Records, that was pressing in Los Angeles. His first single, "My Clam Digger Sweetheart"/"I Don't Give a Hoot," was popular enough that Capitol Records purchased the rights to his recordings. The second Yorgesson release was an early version of "All Pooped Out," which Stewart re-recorded later for Capitol. Once Capitol signed Yogi in October 1949, S&G promoted the singles with ads in trade magazines, and they sold quite well—100,000 copies of the two singles together. Capitol billed their first Yorgesson single, "I Yust Go Nuts at Christmas"/"Yingle Bells," as a Christmas special, and sales took off immediately. Advance orders came from all around the nation, so that Capitol announced that they had a hit on their hands. The song debuted on December 10 at number 24. By the following week, both sides were in the Top Twenty, and the week before Christmas saw both sides of the single in the Top Ten. Right after Christmas, "I Yust Go Nuts at Christmas" reached number five, and the single became one of Capitol's permanent hits—being reissued virtually every year.

Once Capitol saw that Yogi was going to be a star, they prepared the follow-up release, "The Bees and the Birds"/"Real Gone Galoot." That single was released in January (1950), just as sales of the Christmas single were starting to taper off. As Stewart toured, he found that audiences were beginning to prefer his singing comedy over his earlier crystal-ball act, so he began adding his songs to his live repertoire. Although Stewart made money for Capitol, so that he continued with the label for the rest of his career, he had trouble impressing music critics. Reviews in trade magazines were rarely favorable—being generally unappreciative of Stewart's brand of humor.

From 1948 through 1956 Stewart recorded over forty songs as Yogi Yorgesson. Harry was also recognizable, as Yogi, in the Capitol Records promotional film, "Wanna Buy a Record," which starred Mel Blanc. Not content to remain in his niche, he released a political single called "I'm Gonna Vote Republican." The other side was "I'm Gonna Vote for a Democrat." He also hit later that year, 1952, with a concept record called his Family Album. By this time, Yogi's first Capitol single was still the tenth-best-selling overall by the company; only three singles that had come out after "I Yust Go Nuts at Christmas" had outsold it. Beginning in 1953 he adopted other comic personas for some of his releases: Japanese (Harry Kari), country bumpkin (Claude Hopper) and German (Klaus Hammerschmidt). His first single as Harry Kari was a parody of "Yes, Sir, That's My Baby." The record received a terrible review in the March 14, 1953, issue of Billboard stating the record "is supposed to be a comical version of the oldie. It isn't." The following week's paper showed the record as selling in several markets around the country. According to one disc jockey who had to play the record, it was one of the biggest hits of the time but at the same time "one of the most horrible records (he had) ever heard." After that record sold well, prompting several follow-up releases.

== Death ==
Harry Stewart was killed in an automobile accident in 1956 while returning to Los Angeles from an appearance in Ely, Nevada. He was survived by his wife Gretchen, a son, and a stepdaughter. His widow later married comedic actor Jim Edward Jordan.

== Legacy ==
In 1949 Capitol Records released "I Yust Go Nuts at Christmas" and "Yingle Bells," a single by Yogi Yorgesson with the Johnny Duffy Trio. This record was the most popular of Stewart's career, selling over one million copies and earning a gold disc. The two songs have for many years been holiday favorites on the Dr. Demento show.

Stan Boreson and Doug Setterberg recorded eighteen songs written by Harry Stewart and thereby introduced Yogi Yorgesson to a new generation of fans. Five of his songs appeared on their album Honey / Little Green Apples (1969) and another five on Yust Go Nuts at Christmas (1971). Boreson also recorded the 1980 tribute album Yust Tinkin' Of Yogi with eleven more songs by Stewart.

More than a half century after his death, Stewart's recordings are still sold by vintage music stores and online retailers. They can also be found at video-sharing websites and other digital archives, and "I Yust Go Nuts at Christmas" remains in regular recurrent rotation on radio stations during the Christmas season.

== Selected discography ==
- 1952 Yogi Yorgesson's Family Album LP
- 1953 The Trials and Tribulations of Yogi Yorgesson EP
- 1954 Yingle Bells EP
- 1957 Comedy Caravan LP
- 1961 The Great Comedy Hits of Harry Stewart LP
- 1991 Have Yourself A Crazy Little Christmas CD
- 2009 Comedy Caravan (iTunes)

== See also ==
- Scandinavian dialect humor
