= Beulah (radio and TV series) =

Beulah is an American sitcom that ran on CBS Radio from 1945 to 1954, and on ABC Television from 1950 to 1953. The show is notable for being the first sitcom to star an African-American actress, for being ABC TV's first hit situation comedy, and the first hit TV sitcom without a laugh track. The show was controversial for its caricatures of African Americans.

== Radio ==
This ad depicts a turning point in media history on November 24, 1947, the first instance of an African American woman starring in a network radio program, with ad copy noting that she is "queen of the kitchen" and "manages a household".

The Beulah Show
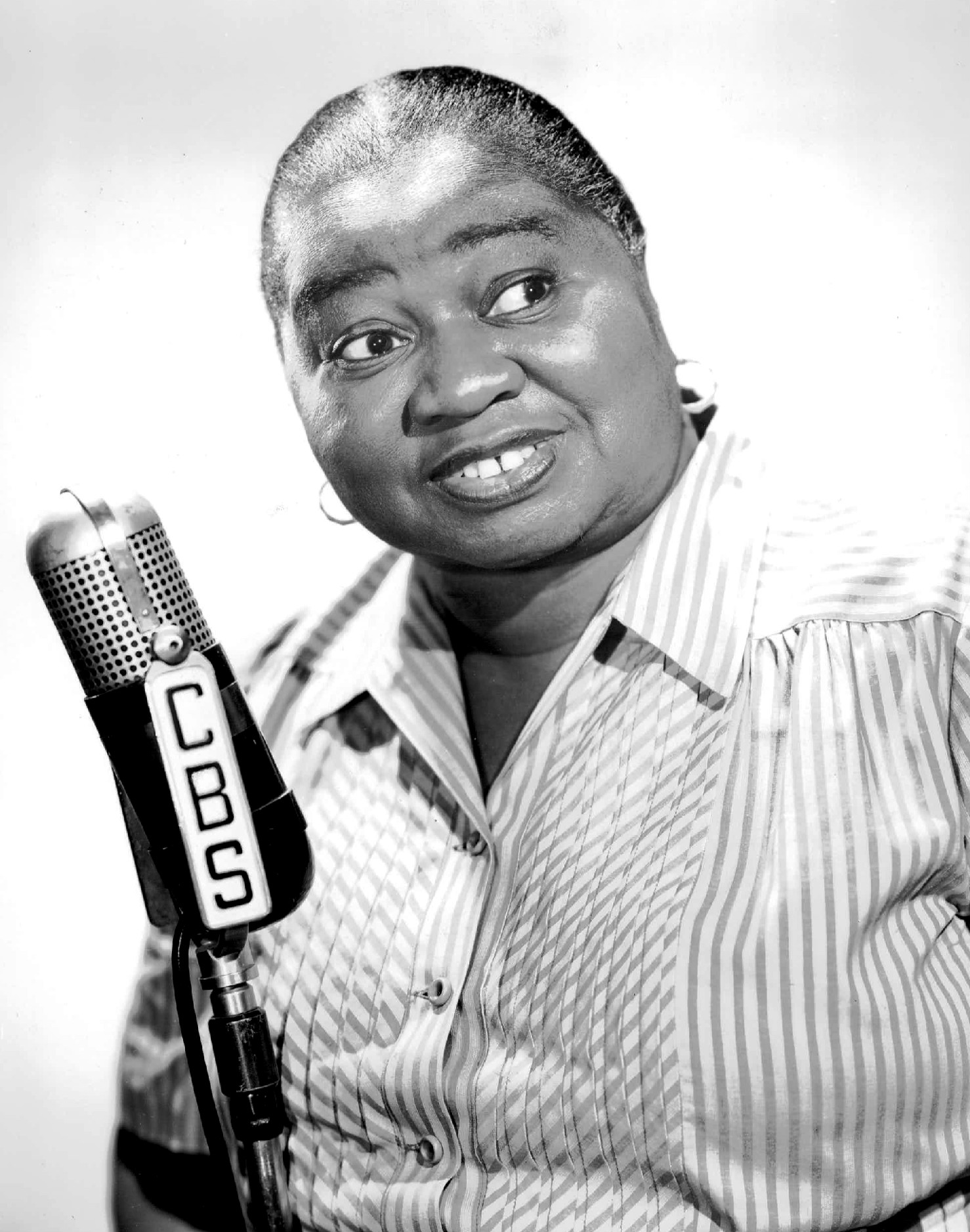
- Hattie McDaniel as Beulah, 1948
- Other names: The Marlin Hurt and Beulah Show (1945–46)
- Genre: Sitcom
- Running time: 30 minutes (1945–47); 15 minutes (1947–54)
- Country of origin: United States
- Language: English
- Home station: CBS (1945–46, 1947–54); ABC (1947)
- Starring: Marlin Hurt; Bob Corley; Hattie McDaniel; Lillian Randolph; Amanda Randolph
- Announcer: Ken Niles (1945–47); Marvin Miller (1947–53); Johnny Jacobs (1953–54)
- Created by: Marlin Hurt; Donald Quinn
- Written by: Phil Leslie; Sol Saks; Herb Finn; Bill Freedman; Sherwood Schwartz; Arthur Julian; Hal Kanter; Howard Leeds
- Original release: July 2, 1945 – May 28, 1954
- Sponsored by: Tums; Dreft detergents; General Foods; General Motors; Murine

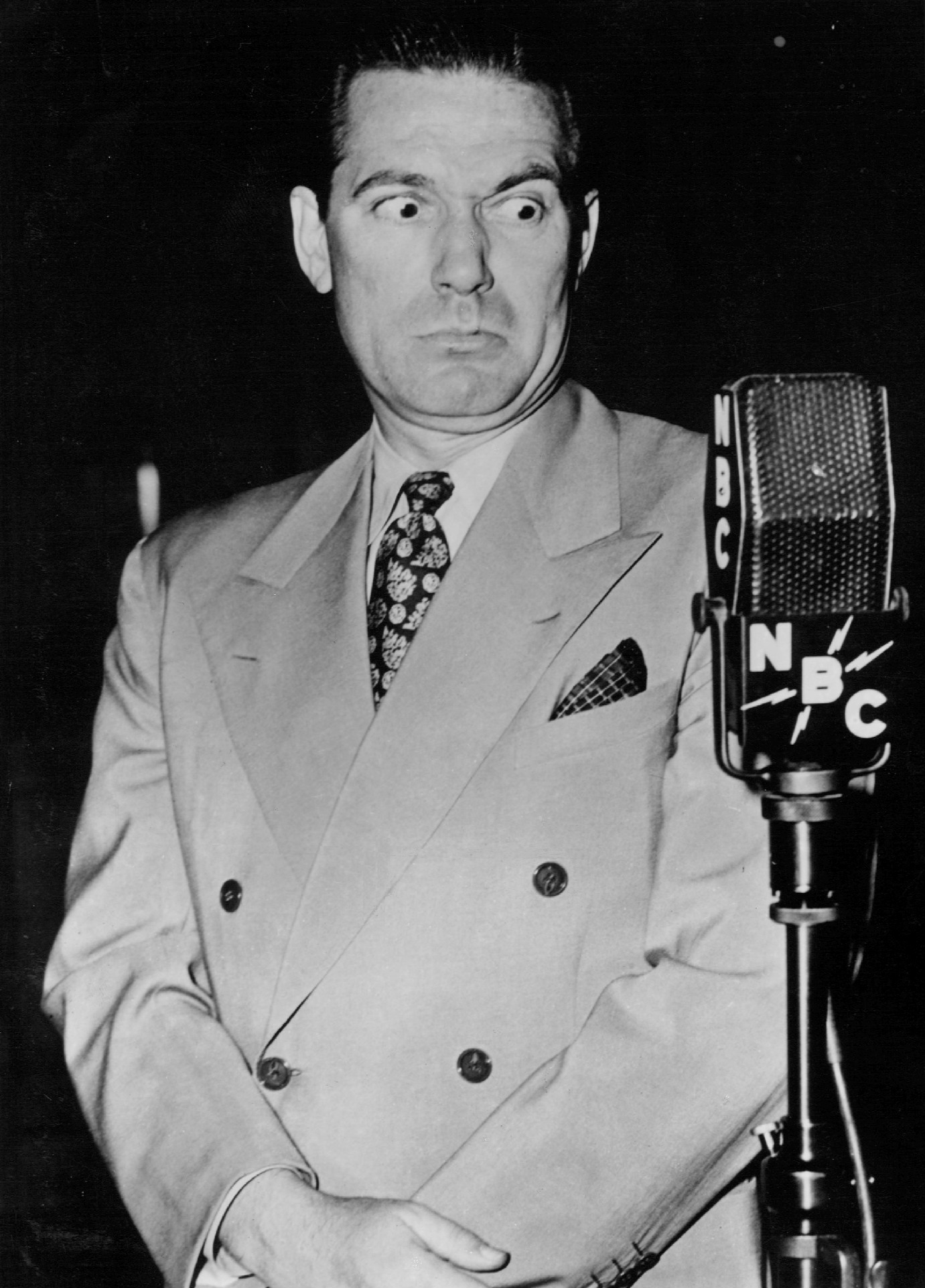
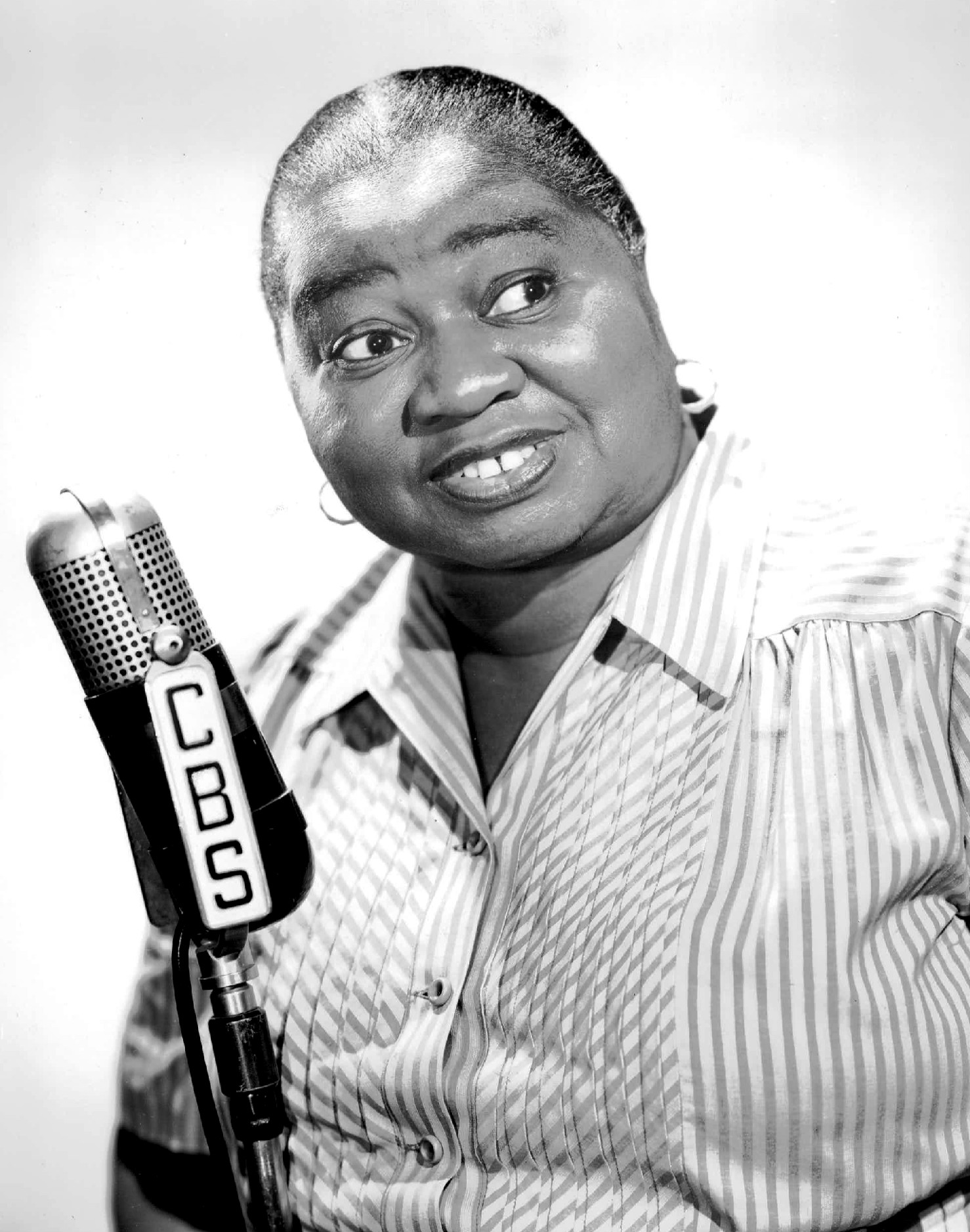
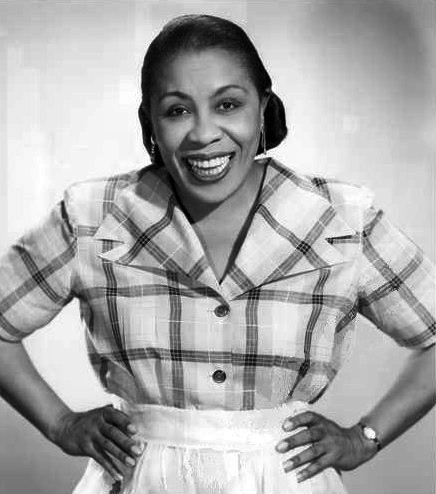
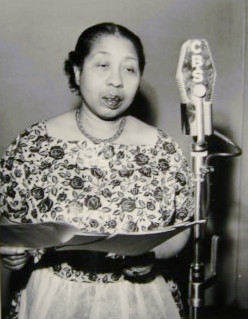
Four personalities who played Beulah. Top: Marlin Hurt, Hattie McDaniel Bottom: Lillian Randolph, Amanda Randolph

Originally portrayed by a white male actor, Marlin Hurt, Beulah Brown first appeared in 1939 when Hurt introduced and played the character on the Hometown Incorporated radio series and in 1940 on NBC radio's Show Boat series. In 1943, Beulah moved over to That's Life and then became a supporting character on the popular Fibber McGee and Molly radio series in March 1944.

On July 2, 1945, Beulah was spun off into her own radio show on CBS, The Marlin Hurt and Beulah Show, sponsored by Tums. Hurt was still in the role of Beulah, and also played the voice of Beulah's boyfriend, Bill Jackson. Beulah was employed as a housekeeper and cook for the Henderson family: father Harry, mother Alice and son Donnie. Rounding out the cast was Oriole Winston, the housekeeper for the family next door to the Hendersons.

After Hurt died of a heart attack in 1946, he was replaced by another white actor, Bob Corley, and the series was retitled The Beulah Show, which ran on ABC as a sustaining program from February 24 to August 20, 1947.

When African-American actress Hattie McDaniel took over the role on November 24, 1947, with the program returning to CBS. She earned $1,000 a week for the first season, doubled the ratings of the original series and pleased the NAACP which was elated to see a historic first: a black woman as the star of a network radio program.

McDaniel continued in the role until she became ill in 1952 and was replaced by Lillian Randolph, who was in turn replaced for the 1953–54 radio season by her sister, Amanda Randolph.

From 1947 to 1953, The Beulah Show was sponsored by Procter & Gamble for their Dreft laundry and dishwashing detergents. The show had multiple sponsors for their final 1953–54 season: General Foods, General Motors and Murine.

In the Hurt and Corley eras of the program, the radio program was a 30-minute weekly sitcom. For most of the show's run (1947–54), the series ran as a 15-minute daily sitcom, a format popular among daytime serials.

== Television ==
The Beulah Show
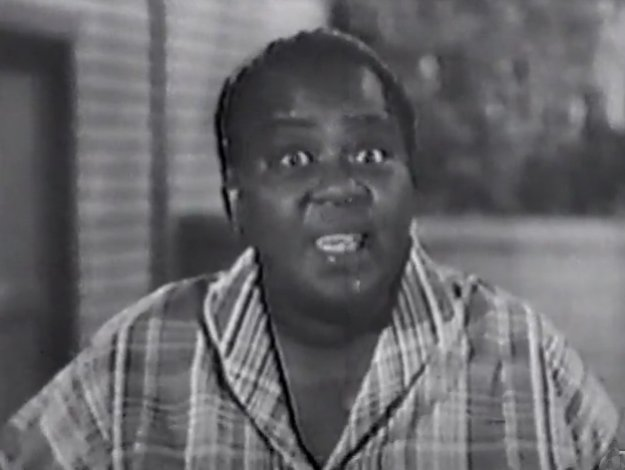
- Louise Beavers as Beulah, doing her monologue at the start of a TV episode
- Genre: Situation comedy
- Created by: Marlin Hurt; Donald Quinn
- Starring: Ethel Waters; Hattie McDaniel; Louise Beavers; Percy "Bud" Harris; Dooley Wilson; Ernest Whitman; Butterfly McQueen; Ruby Dandridge; William Post, Jr.; David Bruce; Ginger Jones; Jane Frazee; Clifford Sales; Stuffy Singer
- Country of origin: United States
- Original language: English
- No. of seasons: 3
- No. of episodes: 87

Production
- Producer: Tom McKnight
- Production company: Roland Reed Productions

Original release
- Network: ABC
- Release: October 3, 1950 – September 22, 1953

In 1950, Roland Reed Productions adapted the property into a TV situation comedy for ABC, and the Beulah TV show ran for three seasons, Tuesday nights at 7:30 Eastern Time from October 3, 1950, to September 22, 1953.

Most of the comedy in the series derived from the fact that Beulah, referred to as "the queen of the kitchen", has the ability to solve the problems that her employers cannot figure out. Other characters included Beulah's boyfriend Bill Jackson, a handyman who is constantly proposing marriage, and Oriole, a befuddled maid for the family next door.

For at least the first season, Beulah was filmed at Biograph Studios in the Bronx while Ethel Waters was simultaneously appearing on Broadway in The Member of the Wedding.

=== Cast changes ===
Ethel Waters starred as Beulah for the first year of the TV series before quitting in 1951. When production moved to Hollywood, Hattie McDaniel, star of radio's Beulah, was cast in the title role in Summer 1951, but only filmed six shows before falling ill. She was replaced by Louise Beavers later in 1951. The McDaniel episodes were shelved pending an improvement of her health, and so the second season began in April 1952 starting with the Beavers episodes. The six McDaniel episodes were tagged onto the end of the second season, starting July 1952 and running until August 1952. It was around this time that McDaniel learned that she had advanced breast cancer. Beavers returned in the role of Beulah for the first part of the third Beulah season, which aired from September to December 1952.

Butterfly McQueen (McDaniel's fellow cast member from Gone With the Wind) starred as Oriole for the first season. Ruby Dandridge, who had played Mrs. Kelso in Cabin in the Sky and the voice of Oriole on the radio version of Beulah, replaced McQueen when the entire television cast was overhauled upon the arrival of Hattie McDaniel. Percy "Bud" Harris originally portrayed Bill, but he walked out on the part during the first season, accusing the producers of forcing him to portray an "Uncle Tom" character. He was succeeded in the role by Casablanca pianist Dooley Wilson, until Ernest Whitman followed radio co-stars McDaniel and Dandridge to TV in April 1952. The show was directed at various times by future sitcom veterans as Richard L. Bare and Abby Berlin.

Like the contemporaneous television program Amos 'n' Andy, Beulah came under attack from many critics, including the NAACP, which accused the show of supporting stereotypical depictions of black characters, with Beulah viewed as a stereotypical "mammy" similar to Aunt Jemima.

=== Episode status ===
A total of 87 episodes were filmed and produced of the television program. All 87 episodes were included in syndication packages throughout the latter half of the 1950s for local stations across the country. Only seven episodes are known to exist on 16mm format and circulate among collectors. All 87 episodes are housed in an archive in their original 35-millimeter format.

21 episodes of the radio series have survived to the present day, as does Bob Corley's audition tape. As a daily sitcom, preserving the radio version of Beulah was not as high of a priority as it was for primetime programming.

The following episodes can be found at YouTube and Archive.org.

- The New Arrival (air date June 10, 1952), with Louise Beavers
- Second Wedding (aka The Advice Columnist, air date June 20, 1952), with Louise Beavers
- The Waltz (air date August 5, 1952), with Hattie McDaniel
- Beulah Goes Gardening (air date August 12, 1952), with Hattie McDaniel

== Cast ==
=== Radio ===
- Marlin Hurt: Bill Jackson, Beulah (1945–1946)
- Bob Corley: Beulah (1947)
- Hattie McDaniel: Beulah (1947–1952)
- Lillian Randolph: Beulah (1952–1953)
- Amanda Randolph: Beulah (1953–1954)
- Hugh Studebaker: Harry Henderson
- Mary Jane Croft: Alice Henderson
- Henry Blair: Donnie Henderson (1947–1953)
- Sammy Ogg: Donnie Henderson (1953–1954)
- Ruby Dandridge: Oriole Winston
- Ernest Whitman: Bill Jackson
- Announcer: Marvin Miller (1947–1953)
- Announcer: Johnny Jacobs (1953–1954)
- Supporting cast members: Louise Beavers, John Brown, Lois Corbet, Dorothy Dandridge, Vivian Dandridge, Roy Glenn, Jess Kirkpatrick, Butterfly McQueen, Nicodemus Stewart

=== Television ===
==== Season 1: October 1950 – late 1951 ====
- Ethel Waters: Beulah
- Wiliam Post Jr.: Harry Henderson
- Ginger Jones: Alice Henderson
- Clifford Sales: Donnie Henderson
- Percy "Bud" Harris: Bill Jackson (October 1950 to early 1951)
- Dooley Wilson: Bill Jackson (early 1951 to 1952)
- Butterfly McQueen: Oriole
- Leslie Uggams made at least one guest appearance as a young girl while Ethel Waters was the star of the show.

==== Season 2: April 1952 – August 1952 ====
- Louise Beavers: Beulah (April–July)
- Hattie McDaniel: Beulah (July–August; six episodes)
- David Bruce: Harry Henderson
- Jane Frazee: Alice Henderson
- Stuffy Singer: Donnie Henderson
- Ernest Whitman: Bill Jackson
- Ruby Dandridge: Oriole

==== Season 3: September 1952 – September 1953 ====
- Louise Beavers: Beulah
- David Bruce: Harry Henderson
- Jane Frazee: Alice Henderson
- Stuffy Singer Donnie Henderson
- Ernest Whitman: Bill Jackson
- Ruby Dandridge: Oriole

== References in other media ==
Beulah was referenced in the mockumentary C.S.A.: The Confederate States of America. In order to make the mock documentary more believable, mock commercials for historical goods and services were used such as Darkie Toothpaste and Coon Chicken Inn. Beulah was advertised as being a show (titled Leave It to Beulah, combining the name of the series with that of Leave It to Beaver, and featuring Beulah as a domestic slave) that Confederate families had grown up watching.

== Listen to ==
- Jerry Haendiges' Preview Listening Lounge: The Beulah Show (1954)
- The Beulah Show at Internet Archive – 1946–1954.
