= The Four Vagabonds =

The Four Vagabonds were an American male vocal group. Active for twenty years (1933–1953), they formed a bridge between the vocal quartet jive of the 1930s and the rhythm and blues vocal groups that thrived after World War II.

== The Vagabonds ==
The Four Vagabonds were formed in 1933 by four African American students at Vashon High School in St. Louis: John Jordan (lead singer), Norval Taborn (baritone), Robert O'Neal (tenor), and Ray Grant (bass; Grant also played guitar accompaniment). Their early work showed strong Mills Brothers influence.

They first appeared on college radio, then on WIL, and then on NBC Radio on KSD. This led to a 1936 move to Chicago radio, including Don McNeill's Breakfast Club and Garry Moore's Club Matinee. Throughout the 1940s the Four Vagabonds made network radio appearances on many national shows, including the Chesterfield Supper Club, the Nat King Cole Show, and others.

On April 1, 1949, during the pioneering early days of television, the local variety show Happy Pappy premiered on the local Chicago station WENR-TV. Hosted by Ray Grant and featuring the Four Vagabonds (as well as the Modern Modes and other groups), it was the first all-African-American television show, although short-lived.

The group continued into the 1950s, with successive replacements (Bill Sanford, Frank Houston) for Ray Grant, who had vision problems. Their last release was a re-issue "P.S. I Love You", in 1953.

In the 1980s original member John Jordan put together a new Four Vagabonds group. In 1997 Billy Shelton, who was a member of the 1980s incarnation, started another Four Vagabonds.

== Deaths ==
Ray Grant died on December 13, 1950.

Robert O'Neal died on December 15, 1968.

John Jordan died on June 16, 1988.

Norval Taborn died on January 23, 1990.

== Discography ==
Year	Song	Label	Format
1941	"Slow and Easy" "Duke of Dubuque"	Bluebird	78 RPM, 10"
	"Rosie the Riveter" (published 1942) "I Had the Craziest Dream"	Bluebird 30-0810	78 RPM, 10"
	"Ten Little Soldiers (On a Ten Day Leave)" "Rose Ann of Charing Cross"	Bluebird 30-0811	78 RPM, 10"
	"It Can't be Wrong" (from 1942 Warner Bros. film Now, Voyager) "Comin' In on a Wing and a Prayer"	Bluebird 30-0815	78 RPM, 10"
	"A G.I. Wish" "If I Were You"	Victor 20-1677	78 RPM, 10"
	"Ho Cake Hominy And Sassafras Tea" "Kentucky Baby"	Apollo 1030	78 RPM, 10"
	"The Pleasure's All Mine" "Do You Know What It Means To Miss New Orleans"	Apollo 1039	78 RPM, 10"
	"Dreams Are a Dime A Dozen" "I Wonder Who's Kissing Her Now"	Apollo 1055	78 RPM, 10"
1947	"P.S. I Love You" "The Freckle Song"	Apollo 1057	78 RPM, 10"
	"Oh My Achin' Back" "Ask Anyone Who Knows"	Apollo 1060	78 RPM, 10"
1947	"Choo Choo" "Lazy Country Side"	Apollo 1075	78 RPM, 10"
	"That Old Gang of Mine" "Heart of My Heart"	Apollo 1076	78 RPM, 10"
	"Oh, What a Polka" "I Can't Make Up My Mind"	Atlas VA111	78 RPM,10"
