= Ken Carson (country singer) =

American singer-songwriter (1914–1994)

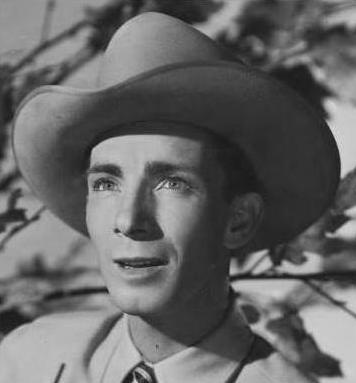
- Born: November 14, 1914; Centrahoma, Oklahoma, US
- Died: April 7, 1994 (aged 79); Delray Beach, Florida, US
- Other name: Hugh Carson
- Occupation: Singer
- Years active: 1926–1979
- Musical career
- Genre: Western music
- Formerly of: Sons of the Pioneers

Hubert Paul Flatt (November 14, 1914 – April 7, 1994). an early member in 22 Roy Rogers films, his voice was featured on their recordings of "Tumbling Tumbleweeds" and "Cool Water".

== Early life ==
Carson was born on November 14, 1914, in Centrahoma, Oklahoma. When he was a few weeks old, his family moved to the oil boom town of Drumright, Oklahoma, where they lived for a time in a tent. Much of his childhood was spent in Wichita, Kansas, living with his maternal grandparents. It was there at age 12 or 13 that he became an accomplished musician, playing guitar and harmonica, and organizing his own band. Shortly thereafter, he and his grandparents joined his mother in the Los Angeles area, where he attended La Puente and Garfield high schools.

== Musical career ==
Carson's adult career began in 1932, at age 17 and still performing as Hubert Flatt. After a short stint on other local radio programs, he spent nine months as a thrice-weekly performer on Stuart Hamblen's popular Family Album radio program, appearing with such early stars as Patsy Montana. He spent the next several years with popular groups in Los Angeles and Chicago. Ken, then billed as 'Shorty Carson', formed a group called The Ranch Boys with Jack Ross and Curley Bradley. The trio played on shows like Don McNeill's Breakfast Club and Garry Moore's Club Matinee, and made several recordings for Decca Records, including "The Lost Chord". In 1934 they appeared in the Clark Gable film It Happened One Night, and in 1935 they were regulars on the Tom Mix radio program, also singing the commercial jingle for Shredded Ralston. In 1938, Carson and The Ranch Boys did a promotion for one of their sponsors, riding 3,975 miles on horseback from Los Angeles to Chicago to New York.

The Ranch Boys split up in 1941, and Carson, now known as Hugh Carson, hosted a late-night radio program on Chicago's WGN. In 1943, the Sons of the Pioneers asked him to replace one of their members who had been drafted into the army. He accepted the invitation and moved to California, working nights at a military aircraft assembly plant. He remained with the Sons of the Pioneers for four years, which were the peak years of their long run of popularity.

Carson also did other radio work, including singing for commercials on the radio series A Day in the Life of Dennis Day.

After his departure from the Sons of the Pioneers, Carson continued as a performer. He appeared on the radio in two episodes of The Great Gildersleeve and voiced the animated wise old owl in Disney's 1948 live-and-animated film So Dear to My Heart. He made many singing commercials during these years. In the early 1950s, he was a regular performer on The Garry Moore Show, one of the most popular TV shows of the day.

Carson mastered at least six instruments. He wrote down many of the songs that Bob Nolan sang, adding harmony and composition to Nolan's "play by ear" vocals. Carson was a skillful whistler, showing that talent on many recordings of Western songs, notably the Pioneers' Blue Shadows on the Trail. He was an accomplished songwriter who also co-wrote many songs with his friends. The Sons of the Pioneers maintained that he was a better singer than Frank Sinatra. His voice was "clear as a bell", which made it difficult for him to blend in with the close harmonies often required with his group.

== Personal life ==
Carson was a horseman, having competed in rodeos as a young man. He was an excellent golfer from his teens onward; at age 22 he won the NBC golf tournament. When he became so good as a natural left-hander, he learned to play golf right-handed. Carson sang at the wedding of Tricia Nixon Cox, which he said was the highlight of his career. In 1979, he and his wife retired to Delray Beach, Florida. Although retired from the national scene, he continued to entertain locally, performing a wide repertoire that included songs of George Gershwin, Cole Porter, Billy Joel, and Stevie Wonder, as well as Western music.

Carson died on April 7, 1994, aged 79, in Delray Beach, Florida, of ALS.
