= Guest house (disambiguation) =

A guest house is a kind of lodging.

Guest house may also refer to:

- Guest House (TV series), a Pakistani television series
- G. E. Guest House, an American TV series
- Guest House (1959 film), a 1959 Hindi film
- Guest House (1980 film), a 1980 Bollywood horror film directed by Shyam Ramsay and Tulsi Ramsay
- Guest House (2020 film), an American comedy
- The Guest House, a 2012 lesbian romance film
- Alexander Inn, Oak Ridge, Tennessee; known as "The Guest House" during the Manhattan Project
- Guest house, a term for an al-Qaeda safe house

== See also ==
- House guest (disambiguation)
