= Durward Kirby =

American television personality (1911–2000)

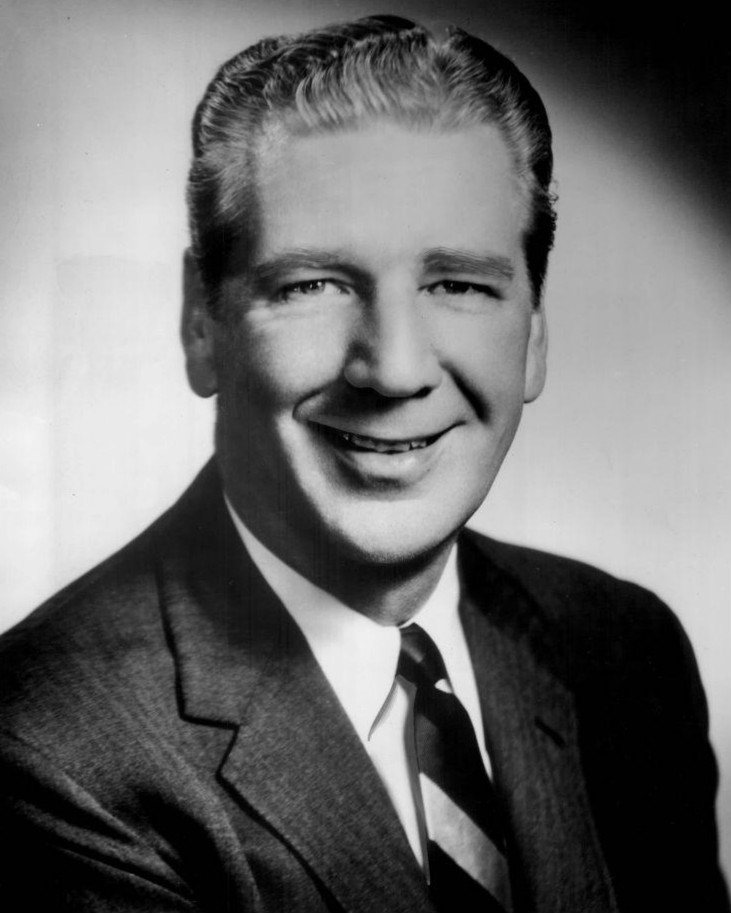
- Kirby in 1962
- Born: Homer Durward Kirby; August 24, 1911; Covington, Kentucky, U.S.
- Died: March 15, 2000 (aged 88); Fort Myers, Florida, U.S.
- Occupations: Television host, announcer
- Years active: 1946–1974
- Spouse: Mary Paxton Young (1941–1994; her death)
- Children: 2

Homer Durward Kirby (August 24, 1911 – March 15, 2000; sometimes misspelled Dirwood Kirby or Durwood Kirby), was an American television host and announcer. He is best remembered for The Garry Moore Show in the 1950s and Candid Camera, which he co-hosted with Allen Funt from 1961 through 1966.

== Early life ==
Kirby was born on August 24, 1911, in Covington, Kentucky, to father Homer C. Kirby and mother Alma Haglage. His family moved to Indianapolis, Indiana, when he was 15. He graduated from Arsenal Technical High School in Indianapolis, then entered Purdue University to study engineering. However, he dropped out to become a radio announcer.

== Radio ==
In 1936, Kirby was an announcer for WLW in Cincinnati, Ohio. In 1937, an Associated Press news story reported that he "made a name for himself" with his reporting on the Ohio River flood of 1937. He also worked at radio stations in Chicago and Indianapolis.

Kirby served in the U.S. Navy during World War II. Following the war, Kirby hosted Club Matinee in Chicago with Garry Moore on the NBC Blue radio network before moving to television in 1949 as an announcer. He also worked on Meet Your Navy and Honeymoon in New York on network radio.

== Television ==
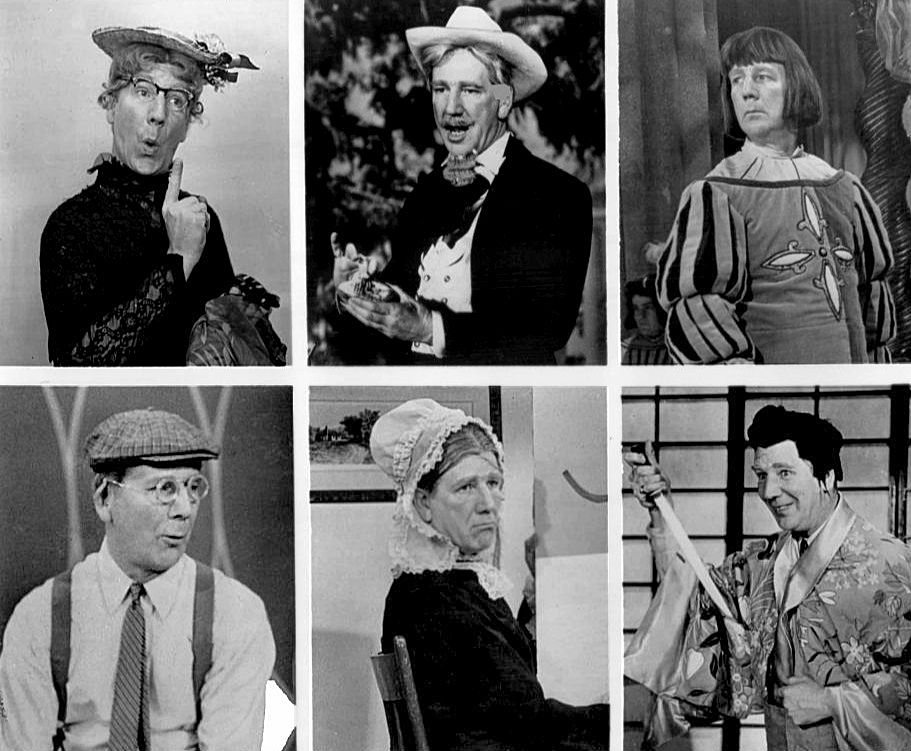
Some of Kirby's comedic roles. Top from left: "Jennie", Old Southern Colonel, Prince Charming. Bottom from left: "Joe Dribble", "Whistler's Mother", a Japanese movie star.

Kirby was a regular on Moore's television shows from 1950 to 1968. The Associated Press's obituary for him gives his years of working with Moore's television show as 1950–1951, 1958–1964, and 1966–1967. Kirby also appeared as a host, announcer, or guest on other television programs such as Auction-Aire (ABC, 1949) and Glamour-Go-Round (CBS, 1950). In the summer of 1951, he was host of G.E. Guest House on CBS, replacing Oscar Levant after the third episode. He served as one of NBC Radio's Monitor "Communicators".

In 1967, Carol Burnett introduced Kirby and his wife, Pax, sitting in the live audience during her opening remarks of season 1 episode 4 of The Carol Burnett Show. In the middle of her opening monologue, Burnett recognized him. Then as the cameras followed, she excitedly ran off stage into the audience to greet Kirby and his wife before returning to complete her monologue.

== Stage ==
Kirby acted in summer stock theater, including three years' appearances in productions at the Cherry County Playhouse in Michigan.

== Other information ==
Kirby was 6 ft 4 in (1.93 m) tall and had a mellow personality that served well as a foil for the stars with whom he worked. A versatile performer, he acted in sketches, sang, and danced. He moved with ease from slapstick to suave sales pitches for the sponsor's product. Critic John Crosby called him "one of the most versatile muggers and comedians on the air."

An embarrassing moment came during a Polaroid commercial, during which he forgot to pull the tab after taking a picture of Garry Moore holding his Christmas list. After nearly a minute of a Polaroid representative yelling, "Pull the tab!" from the audience, Kirby gave a mighty yank with his long arms and pulled all seven remaining pictures out of the camera. This required a fair amount of strength, not only to burst the developer pods but to rip through the stops on the film pack.

== Books ==
Kirby wrote three books — My Life, Those Wonderful Years; Bits and Pieces of This and That; and a children's book, Dooley Wilson.

== Personal life ==
Kirby married Mary Paxton Young on June 15, 1941, in Chicago, Illinois. Paxton was a singer and actress on radio. She died in 1994. They had two sons, Durward Randall, a.k.a. Randy Kirby, an actor (born December 5, 1942) and Dennis Paxton (born June 11, 1949).

== Death ==
Kirby died of congestive heart failure in Fort Myers, Florida, on March 15, 2000, at the age of 88. He was buried next to his wife, Mary, in Coburn Cemetery in Fairfield County, Connecticut, where they had a summer home.

== In literature and the arts ==
Kirby's name was spoofed in the animated series The Rocky and Bullwinkle Show, wherein a man's hat (size 7-5/32) was called the "Kirward Derby". It supposedly had magic powers that made its wearer the smartest person in the world. Kirby considered suing, but his business manager pointed out that it would only bring more attention to the show. Jay Ward, producer of The Bullwinkle Show, even offered to pay Kirby to sue him; however, he did not pursue any further action.

A button reading "Durward Kirby for President in '64" appeared in the January 1964 edition of Mad magazine.

The title track of the 1972 album Scraps by NRBQ includes the line: "I know a mellow-roonie boy named Durward Kirby; I yelled in his ear and wondered if he heard me."

In The Mary Tyler Moore Show episode "Phyllis Whips Inflation" (season 5, episode 114; aired January 18, 1975), the character Phyllis Lindstrom explains that the drop in the price of her Polaroid stock is because the company hired Laurence Olivier to do its television commercials. She says they should have saved money and hired Kirby (a reference to his Polaroid commercial incident).

In the movie Pulp Fiction (1994), the character Mia Wallace (Uma Thurman) orders a "Durward Kirby" burger in a '50s themed restaurant.

== Quotes ==
"Age is just a number, and mine is unlisted."
