= House guest (disambiguation) =

A house guest is a guest in the home of a host.

Houseguest or House Guest may refer to:

== Film and television ==
- Houseguest, 1995 American comedy film
- House Guest, 2008 British reality TV series

=== Episodes ===
- "House Guest", 1961 episode of Westinghouse Playhouse
- "House Guest", 1962 episode of Alfred Hitchcock Presents
- "House Guest", 1970 episode of Bachelor Father
- "House Guest", 1974 episode of Dr. Simon Locke
- "House Guest", 1994 episode of Hangin' with Mr. Cooper
- "House Guest", 2011 episode of Tyler Perry's House of Payne
- "House Guest", 2014 episode of Steven Universe
- "House Guest", 2017 episode of Kim's Convenience
- "House Guest", 2017 episode of My Love from the Star
- "House Guest", 2023 episode of Senior High
- "The House Guest", 1961 episode of The Flintstones
- "The House Guest", 1987 episode of Silver Spoons
- "The House Guest", 2000 episode of Malibu, CA
- "The House Guest", 2011 episode of The Vampire Diaries

== Literature ==
- House Guest, a 1976 play by Francis Durbridge
- House Guest, a 1992 novel by Jasmine Cresswell
- The House Guest, a 1995 novel by Barbara Anderson
- The House Guests, a 1965 non-fiction book by John D. MacDonald
- The Houseguest, a 1988 novel by Thomas Berger

== Other uses ==
- HouseGuest, contestant on Big Brother (TV series)
- House Guests, American funk band

== See also ==
- Guest in the House, 1944 American film noir
- Guest house (disambiguation)
