= Hap Hazard =

American old-time radio comedy-variety program

Hap Hazard is an American old-time radio comedy-variety program that was broadcast on NBC-Red beginning on July 1, 1941 and on CBS beginning in January 1942.

== Premise ==
The title character, Hap Hazard, was the proprietor of Crestfallen Manor, "a ramshackle hotel in the 'Stop-and-Flop' chain." Flaws in the building, such as creaking floors, dripping faucets, and non-shutting doors, kept Hazard busy trying to help guests in the hotel. In the program's CBS version, guests at the hotel demanded "a variety of entertainment ranging from music appreciation lessons to talks on the international situation".

== Personnel ==
=== NBC version ===
On the NBC version, Ransom Sherman had the title role, and wrote the scripts, with Dick McKnight as assistant writer. Edna O'Dell was the show's vocalist, and Harlow Wilcox was the announcer. Billy Mills and his orchestra provided music. Other members of the cast were Elmira Roessler as Miss Mink, Arthur Kohl as Mr. Pittaway, Ray Grant as Demitasse, and Mary Patton as Kitty. Cecil Underwood was the program's producer, and Van Fleming was his assistant. The show initially originated from Chicago, but in August 1941 it moved to Hollywood. Johnson Wax was the sponsor.

Hap Hazard began as a summer replacement for Fibber McGee and Molly, broadcast in that program's time slot from 9:30 to 10 p.m. Eastern Time on NBC-Red. However, it remained on the air when Fibber McGee and Molly returned in the fall. Initial plans called for Hap Hazard moved to Wednesdays from 7:30 to 8 p.m. Eastern Time on NBC-Red beginning on October 1, 1941, but the debut in the new time slot was delayed until October 15, 1941. Shirley Mitchell and Paula Winslowe were in the cast, and Martha Tilton was the singer. Johnson's Car-Nu Wax was the sponsor.

=== CBS version ===
CBS began carrying Hap Hazard in 1942 with a three-week run on seven West Coast stations beginning on January 2. Distribution was expanded to the national network on January 23, 1942. Sherman still portrayed Hazard, and Irene Ryan was in the cast, as was Dix Davis, as the hotel's bellhop. Tilton was the singer, and Gordon Jenkins led the orchestra. Jack Harvey and Arthur Stander were the writers, and Joe Parker was the producer. Ivory Soap was the sponsor. The show was broadcast on Fridays from 10 to 10:30 p.m. Eastern Time, replacing Hollywood Premiere.
