= Garry Moore =

American entertainer, comedian, and game show host (1915–1993)

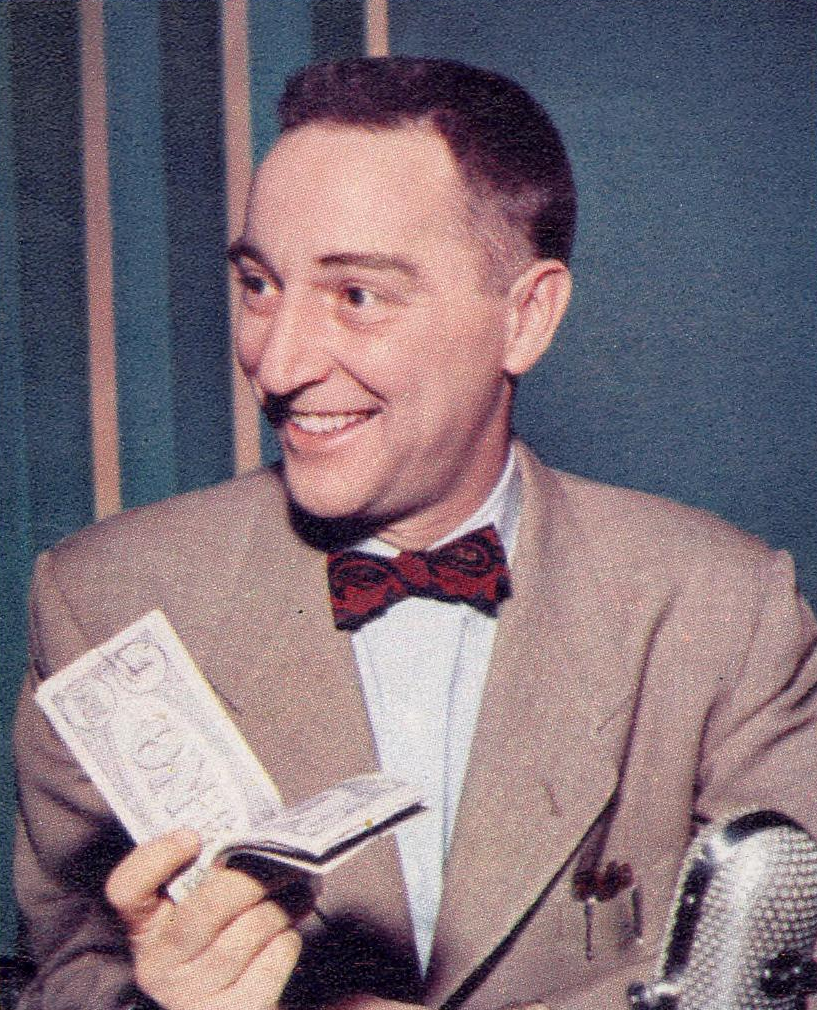
- Moore c. 1954
- Born: Thomas Garrison Morfit; January 31, 1915; Baltimore, Maryland, U.S.
- Died: November 28, 1993 (aged 78); Hilton Head, South Carolina, U.S.
- Occupations: Entertainer; game show host; comedian; humorist
- Years active: 1937–1990
- Known for: The Garry Moore Show, I've Got a Secret, To Tell the Truth
- Spouses: Eleanor "Nell" Borum Little (m. 1939; died 1974) Mary Elizabeth "Betsy" DeChant (m. 1975)
- Children: 2

Garry Moore (born Thomas Garrison Morfit; January 31, 1915 – November 28, 1993) was an American entertainer, comedic personality, game show host, and humorist best known for his work in television. He began a long career with the CBS network starting in radio in 1937. From 1949 through the mid-1970s, Moore was a television host on several variety and game shows.

After dropping out of high school, Moore found success first as a radio host and later moved to television. He hosted several daytime and prime time programs titled The Garry Moore Show, and the game shows I've Got a Secret and To Tell the Truth. He was instrumental in furthering the career of comedic actress Carol Burnett. He became known early in his career for his bow ties and his crew cut.

After being diagnosed with throat cancer in 1976, Moore retired from broadcasting, making only a few rare television appearances. He spent the last years of his life in Hilton Head, South Carolina and at his summer home in Northeast Harbor in Maine.

== Early life and radio career ==
Moore was born on January 31, 1915, in Baltimore, Maryland, the son of Mason P. Morfit and Mary L. (née Harris) Morfit. He attended The Baltimore City College (an all-boys, selective / specialized "magnet" public high school). During his City College years he was very active in theater and drama/comedy/musical programs and was often written about in the school's publications, but he dropped out before graduation to pursue a career in the relatively new radio medium.

Decades later in 1971 he returned to his hometown for a nostalgic tour and interviews in the other local daily paper 'The Sun' for a Sunday magazine photo-spread and the City College student newspaper 'The Collegian'.

Beginning in 1937, Morfit worked for the Baltimore radio station WBAL, owned by the Hearst Corporation and affiliated with NBC's Red Network, as an announcer, writer and actor/comedian. He moved on to the network within a few years, becoming an announcer on the Red Network's Chicago-based program Club Matinee. The show's host, Ransom Sherman, held a contest to find a more easily pronounceable name for the young Baltimore announcer. "Garry Moore" was the winning entry, which was submitted by a woman from Pittsburgh who received a prize from the show of $100. So "T. Garrison Morfit" was known forever after as "Garry Moore".

It was on the Club Matinee program where he first met his long-time friend and broadcasting partner Durward Kirby.

Moore headed Talent, Ltd., another variety program on Sunday afternoons in 1941. In the following years, Moore became more popular and appeared on numerous network radio shows.

For four years during the war-time and post-war era years 1943 to 1947, Jimmy Durante and Moore had a joint variety/comedy show The Durante-Moore Show with Moore as the "straight man" in a comedy act and Durante shelling out the jokes and one-liner jabs. Impressed with his ability to interact with audiences, the Columbia Broadcasting System (CBS) offered him his own TV show. In 1949, the one-hour daytime variety show The Garry Moore Show began airing on CBS. Moore briefly returned on-air to radio two decades later as host of NBC's Monitor the long-running daily news / features program on NBC Radio News network in 1969.

== Television career ==
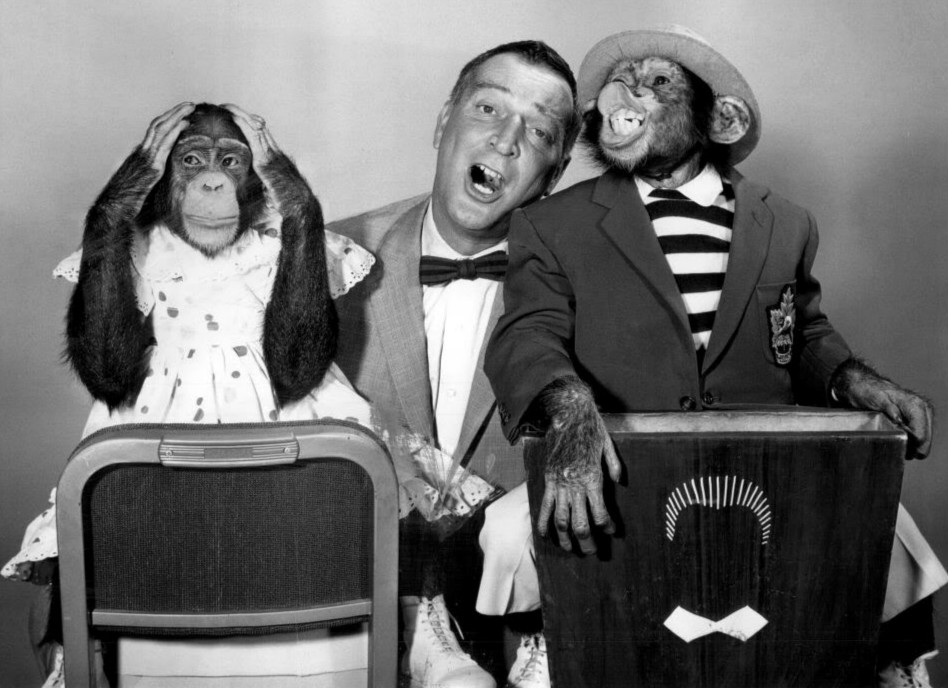
Moore with his guests the Marquis Chimps in 1959

Between 1947 and 1950, Moore began to make tentative steps into television as a panelist and guest host on quiz and musical shows. On June 26, 1950, he was rewarded with his own 30-minute CBS early-evening talk-variety TV program, The Garry Moore Show, which was a shorter version of his radio show. Until September 1950, it was also simulcast on radio. During 1950 and 1951, he hosted prime-time variety hour summer replacements for Arthur Godfrey and his Friends. He appeared as a guest star on other programs including CBS's Faye Emerson's Wonderful Town.

During his run as a variety-show host, Moore was tapped to host CBS' weekly prime-time TV panel show I've Got a Secret. It premiered on June 19, 1952. On this show, Moore began his friendships with comedian Henry Morgan and game show host and panelist Bill Cullen, with whom he later had a long working relationship. Morgan later stated that Moore had helped him keep his job as a television host.

Moore became known for his involvement in the variety of stunts and demonstrations of the show's contestants. The popularity of I've Got a Secret led to a cameo in the 1959 film It Happened to Jane. In the film, Doris Day's character was a contestant on the show, with Moore and all the panelists playing themselves.

Moore's variety program was moved to a daytime slot, where it ran until June 27, 1958. Within three months of the end of the daytime show, Moore and his longtime colleague Durward Kirby moved the revived The Garry Moore Show into prime time as a Tuesday night comedy and variety hour that ran from September 30, 1958, to June 14, 1964. Although the show was a bigger hit in prime time, Moore always preferred the daytime housewife audience. He thought it gave lonely housewives something to listen to and watch while they worked.

The Garry Moore Show featured regular supporting cast members Durward Kirby, Marion Lorne, Denise Lor, and Ken Carson, as well as a mixture of song-and-dance routines and comedy skits. The show provided a break into show business for many performers, including Alan King, Jonathan Winters, and Dorothy Loudon. The show also introduced the public to comedienne Carol Burnett. After the show ended, Burnett became a star in her own right, hosting The Carol Burnett Show, from September 1967 through the spring of 1978.

During preparations for one episode of his variety show, Moore and his writing team knew it wasn't going to be a very good episode despite staying up late the night before to do rewrites. So, at the start of the show, Moore went in front of the live audience and flat out told that audience as well as the audience at home that it wasn't going to be a good show and recommended to the home viewing audience to tune in to what was airing on the rival networks that night. Every time a joke would bomb with the audience, Moore would turn to the camera and say, "it's your fault for still watching this!" The home audience was so fascinated by the frank honesty of Moore that they stuck with the episode, and it was one of the highest-rated episodes of the season.

In 1961, during an episode with French magician Michel de la Vega, Garry Moore was tied up and placed into a trunk. Garry proved to be a very good assistant to the magician and the act went smoothly before the cameras. Audience reaction was so great and immediate that a repeat performance was scheduled. The second presentation brought an even greater flood of mail and telegrams praising the act. By popular demand, Michel was brought back to l've Got a Secret for the third time. In 1962, Moore was hypnotized live in I've Got A Secret by Michel de la Vega. The French hypnotist set Moore's body stretched out over 2 chairs. Michel de la Vega then stood on top of Moore's body showing how rigid it had become in a matter of minutes. It was the first performance of hypnosis on American television.

On the tenth anniversary broadcast of I've Got a Secret, on June 19, 1962, Moore announced that he had recently had an operation on his right hand, and that was why he was seen shaking hands with his left hand for a few months, protecting his right hand from strong handshakes. On an episode of the show that September, guests Viola and Stephen Armstrong appeared with the secret that their son Neil had been selected as an astronaut by NASA that day. Speaking with the Armstrongs after the panel guessed their secret, Moore asked them "How would you feel if it turns out, because nobody knows, that your son is the first man to land on the moon?"

The Garry Moore Show was cancelled in 1964, and in the summer of that year, after having been on radio and television for 27 uninterrupted years, Moore decided to retire, saying he had "said everything [he] ever wanted to say three times already." He gave up hosting I've Got a Secret and was replaced by comedian Steve Allen, who hosted the show until the end of its run in 1967 (although Moore had ended his retirement before I've Got a Secret left the air, he never returned to the series as host and Allen helmed a subsequent, one-season syndicated revival in 1972). Moore's main activity during his hiatus was a trip around the world with his wife.

After an absence of two years, The Garry Moore Show returned to the CBS prime-time lineup in the fall of 1966. It was canceled mid-season because of low ratings against NBC's highly rated western Bonanza. The successful Smothers Brothers Comedy Hour replaced The Garry Moore Show in the CBS time slot.

Moore then made sporadic television guest appearances such as cameos on Rowan and Martin's Laugh-In, reunions with Carol Burnett on her program, and serving as a panelist on various game shows, before Mark Goodson asked him to host another series. That show was a revival of To Tell the Truth, which had ended its run on CBS in 1968. Moore was asked to host a revival of the series for syndication, which launched in September 1969. When To Tell the Truth was planned to be revived for syndication, producers Mark Goodson and Bill Todman originally wanted Bud Collyer to host the show once again. But when they called Collyer he declined, citing his poor health.

When Goodson and Todman called Moore about the job, he immediately contacted Collyer, who told Moore, "I am just not up to it." Moore often took part in the show's silly and goofy stunts, as he had done on I've Got a Secret, performing magic tricks and cooking. This led to this version of To Tell the Truth's being compared to I've Got a Secret. Moore hosted the series from its premiere until the midway point of the 1976–77 season, the revival's eighth.

== Recording ==
In 1944, Moore recorded six of his radio monologues for Decca, including his classic “Hugh, the Blue Gnu”, his triple-time speed reading of “Little Red Riding Hood”, and a calamity-filled version of “In the Good Old Summertime”. They were released two years later as Decca 444, an album of three 78 rpm records titled “Culture Corner”. In 1956, Moore recorded a Columbia LP record album for children. It featured tales by Rudyard Kipling, including "The Elephant's Child" and "How the Camel Got His Hump." Also in 1956, Moore recorded a Columbia LP record album titled "Garry Moore Presents My Kind Of Music," with contributions by jazz musicians George Barnes, Ernie Caceres, Wild Bill Davison, Randy Hall, Mel Henke, and Sonny Terry. In 1965, he also narrated two children's classics for orchestra back-to-back on a single Westminster LP, Saint-Saens' Carnival of the Animals and Prokofiev's Peter and the Wolf.

== Personal life ==
Moore married Eleanor Little in 1939; they had two sons.

== Retirement and death ==
Moore became ill in 1976 and was diagnosed with throat cancer. He left To Tell the Truth shortly before Christmas 1976 to undergo surgery, turning the show over to panelist Bill Cullen. Semiregular panelist Joe Garagiola also acted as the host for several weeks, claiming he was "pinch-hitting" for Moore.

Moore returned in September 1977 to begin To Tell the Truth's ninth season, to explain his sudden absence and to announce his permanent retirement, explaining that while recovering from his surgery, he believed his throat cancer was a sign that continuing beyond his 42-year career would be "just plain greed". Moore later explained in another interview that he felt comfortable moving on from the world of entertainment. Joe Garagiola hosted the program for the rest of the season, which proved to be its last. After his showbiz retirement, Moore kept getting various offers for more work and he continued to turn them down, including frequent phone calls from the producers of The Love Boat.

Moore retired to Hilton Head, South Carolina, where he spent his time sailing, and also at his summer home in Northeast Harbor, Maine. Moore also became a regular humor columnist for Hilton Head's local newspaper The Island Packet with a column titled "Mumble, Mumble", later releasing a book of his columns under the same name in the early 1980s. He made two rare television appearances during his retirement, in a 1984 special on game-show bloopers, hosted by William Shatner, and in a 1990 television tribute to Carol Burnett on Sally.

Moore, a constant smoker, died of emphysema at Hilton Head on November 28, 1993, at the age of 78. He was buried in Forest Hill Cemetery in Northeast Harbor, Maine. He was named one of the 15 greatest game-show hosts of all time by Time.

Media offices
Preceded by First Host	Host of I've Got a Secret; 1952–1964	Succeeded by Steve Allen
Preceded by Bud Collyer	Host of To Tell the Truth; 1969–1976	Succeeded by Joe Garagiola
