= Meet Your Navy =

Meet Your Navy was a wartime radio programme broadcast Saturday nights on the Blue Network, originating from the U.S. Naval Training Center in Lake County, Illinois via WLS (AM). It was a half-hour show, which featured a cast of 275 naval personnel, of which 200 members formed a choir, and the rest formed an orchestra, and supplied soloists, actors and announcers.

Publicity photo issued by the Blue Network, circa 1943, showing the cast of "Meet Your Navy" at the Great Lakes Naval Training Center. Collection of E.O. Costello
