= G. E. Guest House =

American TV quiz series (1951)

- Genre: Quiz show
- Presented by: Oscar Levant; Durward Kirby
- Country of origin: United States

Original release
- Network: CBS
- Release: July 1 – August 26, 1951

G. E. Guest House is an American television quiz program that was broadcast on CBS from July 1, 1951, until August 26, 1951. Oscar Levant was host for the first three episodes, after which Durward Kirby had that role. It was also known as Guest House and General Electric Guest House.

== Format ==
Each episode featured a four-celebrity panel. The individual member varied from week to week, but each group contained a critic, a performer, a producer, and a writer. Panelists competed to determine which one could correctly answer the most questions about show business. During Levant's time as host, he played some musical selections on a piano and led a musical quiz segment. Guest stars also appeared on each episode to "render their various specialties".

People who appeared as panelists or performing guests included Herman Levin, Isabel Bigley, Binnie Barnes, John Cecil Holm, Cornelia Otis Skinner, Wendy Barrie, William Gaxton, Joe E. Brown, Lanny Ross, Constance Bennett, and John Gassner.

== Production ==
G. E. Guest House was broadcast live on Sundays from 9 to 10 p.m. Eastern Time, replacing Fred Waring's show. The sponsor was General Electric. Young & Rubicam packaged the program. An article in the trade publication Billboard in early August 1951 noted that lack of success of Guest House and two other shows put together by that agency might lead to its exit from packaging TV shows entirely.

== Critical response ==
Sam F. Lucchese, writing in The Atlanta Journal, said that Levant's performance in the premiere episode was so objectionable that Lucchese chose not to watch the second one. He wrote, "Levant's supercilious attitude and his snide remarks to fellow performers on his program left a bad taste after an otherwise good show." He also quoted another viewer who said that Levant "made himself so obnoxious" that the viewer was tempted to get rid of any of the sponsor's products that he owned.

Media critic John Crosby described G. E. Guest House as one of several "pretty darned good quiz shows" in the summer of 1951. He called the program "an ingenious operation, strongly bolstered by straight entertainment" and wrote that the quiz and entertainment aspects were sometimes supplemented by "some pretty amazing displays of temperament between the guests".

Larry Wolters wrote in the Chicago Tribune that the program "set a new high in contrived banter, labored humor, and mechanical informality." He commented on Levant's rudeness and wrote of the show, "All in all it was a sort of variety hodge-podge — and an interminable one."

Jack O'Brian's review of the premiere episode for the International News Service noted Levant's "orneriness" and called the episode "a mishmash of melody, many questions, some answers, and a great deal of short temper which bore the clear markings of labored preparation and rehearsal." Still, he described the show as "better than fair fun".
