= List of Senior High episodes =

Episodes of Philippine teen drama television series

Senior High is a Philippine teen drama television series airing on Kapamilya Channel and streaming on iWantTFC. It aired on the network's Primetime Bida evening block and worldwide via The Filipino Channel from August 28, 2023, to January 19, 2024, replacing Dirty Linen.

== Series overview ==
Season	Episodes	Originally released	
Season	Episodes	First released	Last released
1	50	August 28, 2023	November 3, 2023
2	55	November 6, 2023	January 19, 2024

== Episodes ==
=== Season 1 ===
No. overall	No. in season	Title	TV title	Original release date	AGB Nielsen Ratings (NUTAM People)
1	1	"Hello, Goodbye"	"Pagbubukas"	August 28, 2023	3.6%
Following her grandmother's death, Sky is forced to live with her estranged family members and go to Northford High School, where her twin sister Luna attends for a bright future. However, that dream suddenly turns bleak when tragedy comes upon them.
2	2	"Bullied"	"Kids"	August 29, 2023	3.8%
The authorities conclude that Luna's tragic fate is self-inflicted, but Lydia remains convinced that there is foul play. Later, Sky is left shocked and alarmed after discovering a disturbing video involving her late twin sister.
3	3	"Person of Interest"	"Social Status"	August 30, 2023	4.3%
Sky stumbles upon unsettling videos of Luna being bullied by Z. She shows it to Tania, only to be surprised that her mother knows what her twin sister went through all along. Archie discovers Harry’s dirty secret.
4	4	"Connections"	"Sabotage"	August 31, 2023	3.9%
As Sky dives deeper into her theory, she learns that Luna was romantically involved with one of Northford High’s students. Meanwhile, Lydia conducts her own investigation into Luna’s death.
5	5	"Blood Ties"	"Video"	September 1, 2023	3.8%
Sky probes Obet about his past relationship with Luna. Archie ends up in the hospital after taking dangerous drugs. Fed up with his father's harsh words, Archie stuns Harry with another revelation.
6	6	"Set-up"	"Stolen"	September 4, 2023	3.9%
Rumors about Archie's drug incident start circulating in Northford. Sky makes up for her low grades by accomplishing a special assignment, but an enemy tries to sabotage her. Refusing to back down, the tough newbie finds a way to retaliate.
7	7	"Gaslighting"	"Defend"	September 5, 2023	4.0%
Things do not go as planned for Sky when she comes face-to-face with Z and Northford's influential families in a meeting. Obet finds himself in a risky situation when Lydia and the school heighten the alert for illegal activities among students.
8	8	"Father of the Year"	"Encounter"	September 6, 2023	3.7%
Taking notice of the tension between Tania and Harry during a school event, Sky finds a way to confirm her hunch. After getting a reality check from her own daughter, Tania finally gathers all the courage and issues the Aguerros a stern warning.
9	9	"Raid"	"Absent"	September 7, 2023	4.5%
Sky presses Tania into revealing the truth behind the latter's relationship with Harry. Obet gets pressured by his older brother to skip classes and sell drugs to Archie.
10	10	"Consequences"	"Caught"	September 8, 2023	4.2%
Obet and Archie find themselves on the verge of getting caught by the authorities for their illegal dealing. Tania faces another dilemma when an unexpected person ends up in her shop. Harry and Sasha receive upsetting news about their children.
11	11	"Allies"	"Revelation"	September 11, 2023	4.9%
Tania brings the intoxicated Archie home from her shop, only for the latter to reveal her and Harry's secret in front of the Aguerros. Sky finds an ally in Lydia after discovering a crucial detail about her twin sister's death from the lady guard.
12	12	"Aftermath"	"Apologize"	September 12, 2023	4.7%
Sasha leaves the family home following her discovery of Harry's betrayal. Despite Tania's objections, Sky continues to investigate and tries to get her hands on CCTV footage in Northford, unaware that another person shares the same goal.
13	13	"Deep Fake"	"Fake"	September 13, 2023	3.9%
A video of Z bullying Luna resurfaces, this time with a different face of the assailant. Lydia catches a colleague red-handed performing a clandestine activity inside the campus.
14	14	"Abducted"	"Collab"	September 14, 2023	4.1%
Lydia informs Principal Amanda that Domeng tampered with the school's CCTV. A collaboration project shakes up the status quo in Northford Senior High School. Soon, an unforeseen danger befalls Sky.
15	15	"Collab"	"Sincere"	September 15, 2023	4.4%
Harry attempts to do damage control by striking a deal with Sky and forcing his other children to apologize to the latter. The preparations begin for the class collab project. Sky sets her sights on obtaining the investigation files of Luna's case.
16	16	"Governor's Ball"	"Ball"	September 18, 2023	4.1%
Sky and her friends receive unexpected invitations to the Governor's Ball. Despite his father's disapproval, Gino remains determined to make his band perform at the party. Later, Sky overhears a shocking conversation concerning her sister's death.
17	17	"Target"	"Suspicious"	September 19, 2023	3.9%
Harry suspects that Sky overheard his conversation with William regarding Luna's death and tries to intimidate the student. After telling Roxy and Tim about her discovery, Sky thinks of a plan to uncover the truth.
18	18	"Abused"	"Punishment"	September 20, 2023	3.5%
William refuses to take Gino and Cecille's underhanded scheme lightly. Punished by his father, Gino receives help from an unlikely source. Tania finally gives in to Sky's request and hands the latter Luna's police and autopsy reports.
19	19	"Stealth"	"Dare"	September 21, 2023	4.5%
Collab partners clash amid their preparations for their project. Meanwhile, Sky finds an opportunity to get close to the Acostas as she stops at nothing to uncover the truth behind Luna's death.
20	20	"Presentation"	"Forbid"	September 22, 2023	4.5%
Sky moves to search for evidence in the Acosta household and later reveals her recent discoveries to Lydia. Archie finds a malicious way to exact revenge on Roxy amid the students' collab project presentations.
21	21	"Note"	"Letter"	September 25, 2023	3.9%
Just when Archie thought he had gained the upper hand against Roxy and Tim, Harry decides to teach his willful son a lesson. Sky's suspicion toward Gino grows when she finds a puzzling note written by Luna for the young Acosta.
22	22	"Get Even"	"Payback"	September 26, 2023	4.1%
Roxy and Tim settle scores with Archie, but their plan takes an unexpected turn when a witness turns to blackmail. Gino comes clean to Sky about his true relationship with Luna, only to get blamed for the latter's death.
23	23	"Abuse"	"Me Too"	September 27, 2023	4.6%
Gino warns his friends about Sky's suspicions. Meanwhile, Sky helps her abused classmate seek justice against Vice Principal Castrodes. However, an unexpected name emerges as one of the victims after more students decide to come forward.
24	24	"Damage Control"	"Command"	September 28, 2023	4.8%
Believing that Vice Principal Castrodes is the culprit in Luna's case, Tania and Sky rush to the precinct to confront the sexual offender. As Northford tightens its security, Lydia finds a chance to get hold of some CCTV footage to obtain evidence.
25	25	"Hard Drive"	"Proof"	September 29, 2023	5.0%
Sky, Lydia, and Obet try to find ways to open the password-riddled hard drive containing the school's CCTV videos. Roxy and Tim find their backs to the wall when Archie turns to blackmail after discovering their recent act of revenge against him.
26	26	"Caught on Camera"	"Suspicion"	October 2, 2023	4.1%
Lydia inches closer to confirming her hunches surrounding Luna's death as Obet's hacker pal successfully opens the CCTV files. Meanwhile, news about the missing hard drive reaches William, prompting him to warn Gino and the latter's friends.
27	27	"Blame Game"	"Footage"	October 3, 2023	4.2%
Poch finds himself in dire straits when the CCTV footage disproving his lie during the investigation into Luna's death surfaces. As Poch's confession sparks accusations against their children, Harry and William look for a way to absolve them.
28	28	"Alibi"	"Statement"	October 4, 2023	4.6%
Poch and Archie make up an alibi to clear their names from accusations of being involved in Luna's death, much to Tania's distress. While Archie and Z turn their backs on him, the lone Robles receives help from the Acostas.
29	29	"House Guest"	"Offer"	October 5, 2023	4.8%
Tania decides to pursue a legal case against Poch and Archie, to hold them accountable for their actions. The Acostas adopted Poch for the meantime, but was instructed to follow the rules set by Gov. Acosta.
30	30	"Bread Crumbs"	"Disclosure"	October 6, 2023	3.4%
Kenjie disclosed Sky about an altercation he observed between Luna and Poch, while keeping a distance. Lydia suspects a missing file, one hour in length, in the retrieved folder from the hard drive.
31	31	"New Lead"	"Absolved"	October 9, 2023	4.2%
The police found the evidence inconclusive to continue on with the investigation. Kenjie, wanting to impress Z and their group, decided to frame Sky by giving her an unknown cheat code during their exam, getting the latter suspended.
32	32	"Not a Cheater"	"Framed"	October 10, 2023	4.5%
Kenjie confessed to Sanya that he falsely implicated Sky to fit in with the popular kids, leading Sanya to cut ties with him and report the truth to Principal Perino.
33	33	"Tables Turned"	"Warning"	October 11, 2023	4.0%
Kenjie admitted that Z masterminded Sky's false implication, while Sanya told Sky that Gino helped support their statement, leading Sky to express gratitude. Meanwhile, Lydia found out that Tonio was also present at the crime scene after recovering the missing footage.
34	34	"Pusher"	"Illegal"	October 12, 2023	4.2%
Tonio denied Lydia's accusations, but Obet tearfully exposed his secret drug dealing. Z conceals her eating disorder. Tim overhears Poch and his father's meeting plans, with his father being a wanted criminal, prompting Sky to use it as leverage for a confession about her twin sister.
35	35	"Bad Brother"	"Arrest"	October 13, 2023	4.0%
Lydia urges Tonio to confess to the police about his presence that night but gets arrested. Brandon notices suspicious surveillance on their home. Tania and Sky receive an update on the Luna's case at the police station and Sky became distrustful of Lydia and Obet, but Lydia later promised to cooperate.
36	36	"Walk of Shame"	"Walk of Shame"	October 16, 2023	4.1%
Tania strongly disagreed about the possibility of Tonio selling drugs to Luna. Soledad secretly encouraged Obet to take over Tonio's drug dealing role in Northford. Poch is reluctantly accepted back into the group. Principal Perino advised Lydia to resign from her job because of the case.
37	37	"Like Mother, Like Daughter"	"Package"	October 17, 2023	4.1%
Tim and Roxy find evidence on Poch meeting his wanted father. Soledad tells Sky to update him on her twin sister's case. Sasha sabotaged Tania's tattoo parlor, causing a violation. Tonio told Lydia that Luna bought drugs from him once, that only her "friends" can disclose whether she used it.
38	38	"Luna's Secret"	"Bargain"	October 18, 2023	3.8%
As Harry obstructs the investigation into Luna's case, Sky uses the information she obtained from Tim and Roxy to blackmail Poch and get the truth out of him. However, Poch's confession leaves her crestfallen.
39	39	"Who's the Father?"	"Secrets"	October 19, 2023	4.1%
Poch admits discovering Luna's pregnancy and intends to use it against Sky. Tania presents a tearful letter from Luna that she found days after she was gone, causing an emotional argument with Sky.
40	40	"Coerced"	"Invitation"	October 20, 2023	4.5%
Becca revealed that Obet was probably "in a relationship" with Luna, and remembered that he drove her home in his motorcycle at 2 in the morning. Sanya invited her classmates on her 18th birthday party.
41	41	"Title"	"Allies"	October 23, 2023	4.0%
Sky had an argument with her mother and Harry, angrily criticizing him as a terrible father figure. Sky then leaves and goes to Gino's gig for information. Gino firmly rejects Z's behavior, clarifying that they were never in a relationship, prompting Archie to escort Z away.
42	42	"Broken Trust"	"Suspects"	October 24, 2023	3.9%
Gino and Poch were late for curfew because of their gig. Sky and Tania secretly met Soledad, who confirmed Luna's pregnancy and questioned why they didn't know earlier. Sky narrowed down the possible fathers: Gino and Obet.
43	43	"Deal"	"Confused"	October 25, 2023	4.0%
Poch sees through Tim's plan to get more information about Luna's pregnancy from him. Z throws another fit, putting Sky and Roxy in danger. In an attempt to protect his sister, Archie tries to make a deal with their nemesis.
44	44	"Zyrah's Wish"	"Motive"	October 26, 2023	4.3%
Lydia attempts to talk Tonio into cooperating with Sky. Z suffers a meltdown after learning about Luna's pregnancy, pushing Harry to make a promise to his daughter.
45	45	"Hidden Benefactor"	"Bracelet"	October 27, 2023	4.0%
Cecille gets a taste of William's wrath anew when he discovers that his wife has been helping fund Sky's stay at Northford. Sky's interrogation of Tonio leads to a revelation of her family's secret to Lydia and Obet.
46	46	"Defense!"	"DNA"	October 30, 2023	4.4%
Sky learns from Inspector Soledad that Harry is keeping Luna's embryonic DNA sample. This information reaches Tania, who takes matters into her own hands. Meanwhile, Tim finds Poch defending him against a rival player's dirty basketball moves.
47	47	"First Move"	"Kiss"	October 31, 2023	4.0%
Sky and Gino share a special moment on stage at Sanya's birthday party. Tim tries to comfort a distraught and drunk Poch, but his friendly gesture unexpectedly leads to something more.
48	48	"Catching Feelings"	"Back Fire"	November 1, 2023	4.4%
Z's attempt to humiliate Sky at Sanya's birthday party backfires and karma soon comes back to bite her. Meanwhile, Sky and Gino grow closer to each other.
49	49	"Unpaid Dues"	"Instinct"	November 2, 2023	5.1%
Sky gets informed by Principal Amanda that her tuition is not yet fully paid, putting her future at Northford in jeopardy. Harry sees red as he tries to catch Sasha cheating on him.
50	50	"Another Scandal"	"Surprise"	November 3, 2023	4.1%
Another scandal breaks out in Northford Senior High School after Sasha exposes Luna's pregnancy to get back at Sky. This shocking revelation, meanwhile, sends Wiliam into a panic as it may implicate Gino and tarnish his reputation.

=== Season 2 ===
No. overall	No. in season	Title	TV title	Original release date	AGB Nielsen Ratings (NUTAM People)
51	1	"The Disappearance"	"Plan B"	November 6, 2023	4.4%
William reprimands Harry for mishandling the situation. Lydia, upset, learns about Tonio's "escape" and demands Harry to bring him back. Female students gossip and insult Luna in front of Sky, but Yana speaks out, highlighting their indifference while blaming Luna.
52	2	"Traitor"	"Rebellion"	November 7, 2023	4.4%
Obet, under pressure, confesses to Harry that Soledad is Tonio's boss. Harry was shown evidence that Sasha is cheating on him with Soledad. Gino is reprimanded by his parents and advised to stay away from the matter. Tim starts to question his feelings for Poch.
53	3	"Run"	"Exposed"	November 8, 2023	3.4%
Edith pressures Elmo to sign papers while they argue about when to tell their son about their marriage issues. Sky implores Obet and Gino to provide DNA samples to determine who's Luna's baby's father. Cecille urged Gino to flee following their violent altercation with William.
54	4	"False Hope"	"Alliance"	November 9, 2023	4.2%
Gino meets with Sky, agreeing to give a DNA sample but keeping his location secret from Poch. He promises to take responsibility if he is the father. Lydia finds out that Tonio contacted Obet, bringing relief, but Obet becomes concerned when he hears a gunshot during the call.
55	5	"Deal with the Devil"	"Fall Guy"	November 10, 2023	3.4%
Attorney warned Tania that if Luna's case becomes a homicide, be prepared that Luna's secrets would slowly reveal itself. Desperate to get out of prison, Mr. Castrodes agrees to follow what William instructed him to do, and "confesses" to being the potential father of Luna's baby.
56	6	"Case Reopened"	"Investigation"	November 13, 2023	4.2%
Tania discovers that Luna's case has been reclassified as a homicide, causing her distress. Sky faces uncertainty in Northford as her payment is delayed, but Amanda offers reassurance and support. Cecille persuades William to rehire Lydia and keep an eye on her.
57	7	"Two Fathers"	"Positive"	November 14, 2023	3.8%
Z discovers Archie sarcastically watching Roxy's live stream and joins him. Later, he reports Roxy's account, leading to a 90-day ban for "violations", causing her to panic. Castrodes and Gino both test positive as potential fathers of Luna's baby, greatly distressing Z and causing her to collapse.
58	8	"Retake"	"Broken"	November 15, 2023	3.6%
Amanda suggests redoing the DNA test, which displeases William and Cecille. Tim unexpectedly discovers his parents' marital problems and runs away feeling betrayed. Harry warns Castrodes of consequences if he refuses to provide his DNA.
59	9	"Daddy"	"Daddy"	November 16, 2023	4.0%
Poch finds a distraught Tim alone at the nightclub. Tania intends to subpoena all CCTV footage from the night of the murder. Inebriated, Poch reveals that his source of income is engaging in sexual activities with his sugar daddy. Lydia gets shot by an unidentified stranger she was supposed to meet.
60	10	"Broken Footage"	"Feelings"	November 17, 2023	3.5%
Tim keeps his drunken conversation with Poch a secret from Sky and Roxy while sharing news about his parents. Z, feeling upset, skips classes. Roxy discovers that the Aguerros reside in the condo where she delivers her products, specifically Archie.
61	11	"Willing Victim"	"Abused"	November 20, 2023	4.0%
Sky receive the news of Lydia's breast cancer condition, from Obet. Poch tells Gino to check on his mother, but William blocks their entry. Gino later calls the police, and in turn, William threatens his family.
62	12	"Bracelet"	"Desperate"	November 21, 2023	4.0%
All eyes are on Gino as he gets accused of killing Luna. Desperate to raise money for his grandmother's medical treatment. Obet returns to his old rogue ways. Lydia gives Sky a piece of evidence that may lead her to Luna's killer.
63	13	"Inadmissive Evidence"	"Evidence"	November 22, 2023	3.2%
Sky and Tania hand over the bracelet Lydia found at the place where Luna died to the police, only to learn that the piece of evidence is inadmissible. With this, Sky decides to take matters into her own hands and starts searching for its owner.
64	14	"Caught on Cam"	"CCTV"	November 23, 2023	3.7%
Sky accuses Z of having the bracelet, but Z strongly denies it, refusing to wear inexpensive brands. Roxy exposes Archie as "darkgrey" and threatens to release the video unless he paid for the items he bought from her. Harry threatened his bodyguards for safeguarding Sasha's interactions.
65	15	"Unforeseen Suspect"	"Truth"	November 24, 2023	4.5%
New CCTV footage on the night of Luna's death leads Sky and Obet to an unexpected addition to their list of suspects. Edith talks to Tim about her decision to file for annulment. Harry erupts in anger as he finally catches Sasha with her lover.
66	16	"Adulterers"	"Affair"	November 27, 2023	4.3%
The cracks in the happy facade of the Aguerros' home turn into fissures when Harry sees Red and makes Sasha pay for cheating on him with Darius. Soon, he finds himself rushing to Tania's home upon getting wind of Sky's new discovery.
67	17	"Questioning"	"Anxiety"	November 28, 2023	3.8%
Invited for questioning over Luna's death, Cecille suffers from an anxiety attack when the police show her the evidence Sky holds against her. Poch urges Tim to leave home and live with him amidst their mounting family problems.
68	18	"The Secret is Out"	"Dethrone"	November 29, 2023	3.8%
Another secret is out as Sky and Z get into another heated fight in front of their schoolmates. The board members of Northford High School force William to step down as the school's president in light of the issues hounding Cecille.
69	19	"Call for Justice"	"Out"	November 30, 2023	4.8%
Gino convinces Cecille to give a statement about her meeting with Luna as a group of concerned citizens gathers in front of Northford High School. Tim vents out his frustrations to Elmo and comes out to him.
70	20	"The Enabler"	"Abortion"	December 1, 2023	4.1%
Gino confronts his mother for painting Luna in a bad light with her confession. Elmo urges Tim to come clean about his feelings to Roxy. Sky and Obet find another footage that can implicate Cecille.
71	21	"Arrested"	"Clinic"	December 4, 2023	4.7%
Sasha's father orders Darius to find a way to turn the police's attention away from Harry's disappearance. Looking for a more solid piece of evidence against Cecille, Sky spots a mobile number while scouring Luna's stuff.
72	22	"Rage"	"Relationships"	December 5, 2023	3.6%
Gino throws a fit of rage and beats up William upon learning of Cecille's arrest, believing that it was his father's fault. The governor's son later finds solace in Z's company. Meanwhile, Tim struggles to hide his true feelings from Roxy.
73	23	"Special"	"Break Up"	December 6, 2023	3.4%
Sky grows curious about a familiar pen in Luna's possession. Roxy decides to break up with Tim after he confesses about his special kiss with someone else. Drowning his sorrows in alcohol, Gino comes across a new face.
74	24	"Unaccepted"	"Confession"	December 7, 2023	4.1%
Edith condemns her son's sexuality, pushing Elmo to finally sign their annulment papers. William unravels the truth about the mysterious disappearance of Northford's CCTV footage. Tim comes clean to Sky.
75	25	"Ransacked"	"Broken"	December 8, 2023	3.4%
Tim confesses to Sky about him and Poch, told her that he never made a definitive choice, expressing his struggle to find his identity without hurting anyone. Lydia & Obet got ransacked, but Obet successfully defends against the intruder, leaving Lydia unconscious.
76	26	"Hidden Motive"	"Safety"	December 11, 2023	4.1%
Tim and Edith have a deep conversation, but Tim insists on staying with his father. Lydia and Obet temporarily stay at the Castro's after their home is ransacked. Tim helps Sky investigate the ballpen, but Poch's response to the question seems strange.
77	27	"Identified"	"Ballpen"	December 12, 2023	4.9%
With the keys he stole from Gino, Yosef secretly enters the Acosta residence, searches William's office, and steals the laptop. Lydia goes to the police station to report and identify the intruder who broke into their home. Poch responds suspiciously when Sky asks about a particular ballpen.
78	28	"The Victim's Brother"	"Released"	December 13, 2023	4.9%
Sky and Tania are visibly frustrated when they learn about Mr. Castrodes' release from prison. Yosef is then revealed to be Yana's older brother, who is eager to help his sister find justice, as she fell into a severe depressive state. He believes that William has something to do with it.
79	29	"The Missing Laptop"	"Laptop"	December 14, 2023	4.3%
William panics over the missing laptop and accuses Poch. The group, including Yosef, investigates the laptop but can't access it. Mariano and Darius covertly plot to frame William. William accuses Gino of stealing the laptop, but Gino denies it, mentioning his missing keys.
80	30	"Captured"	"Kidnap"	December 15, 2023	3.8%
Poch escapes and meets Tim to share information about the ballpen, but they both get abducted despite Obet's failed attempt to defend them. Gino recalls that Yosef, who brought him home while he was drunk, may have taken his keys. Sky & Roxy then learns of the kidnapping, from Obet.
81	31	"Left Behind"	"Sugar Daddy"	December 18, 2023	4.1%
While investigating Yosef, Gino realizes he was manipulated while drunk, to gain access to the house. The kidnappers severely beat Poch and Tim, rendering them unconscious. It is revealed that William is Poch's sugar daddy, who orchestrated the kidnapping and threatens Tim's safety.
82	32	"The Escape"	"Escape"	December 19, 2023	5.0%
Tim managed to escape with the help of Poch. Pong hacks into William's laptop but finds it wiped clean of incriminating evidence. Tim discloses to Soledad that the car belongs to Poch's sugar daddy and that he also orchestrated the kidnapping. Yosef enacts his vengeance upon Mr. Castrodes.
83	33	"The Other Party"	"Frustrated"	December 20, 2023	5.0%
Yosef relentlessly interrogates Mr. Castrodes. Tim confesses to Roxy that he kissed Poch, causing Roxy to feel betrayed and leave in distress. She then requested some space for her to process the situation. Pong and Tania uncover damning videos of Mr. Castrodes with some female students.
84	34	"Confession"	"Files"	December 21, 2023	6.0%
Sky overrides Brandon's hesitation and observes Yana undressing in front of Mr. Castrodes. Poch narrowingly evades his captors, disappointing William. Eventually, Mr. Castrodes confesses to involving the girls due to financial & academic struggles, then discloses that Yana was a "gift" for him.
85	35	"The Mastermind"	"Accident"	December 22, 2023	3.8%
Mr. Castrodes informs William that the kids are aware of everything. Yosef meets with Gino, where he reveals William's secret pedophilic behavior and threatens that it will soon be exposed to the public. Poch reveals to Sky, Tim, and Obet that the pen symbolizes William's ownership. Enraged, William tries to run them over.
86	36	"Pull The Strings"	"Escaped"	December 25, 2023	4.4%
William fails to run over Sky and flees when witnesses record the incident. Darius urges the group to gather more witnesses for a more solid evidence against William and Mr. Castrodes. Darius plants evidence in William's office to deflect suspicion. Mr. Castrodes is caught at a police checkpoint.
87	37	"Intercepted"	"Shocked"	December 26, 2023	4.9%
William is caught fleeing. Gino discovers his father's arrest and confirms it with Poch. He also tearfully revealed to Gino that he was one of his father's victims. Gino asked his mother, who is shocked and tearfully apologizes for not knowing.
88	38	"Haunted"	"Nightmare"	December 27, 2023	4.9%
William vehemently denies the accusations. Lydia admits to having video footage of the night Luna died but justifies her actions, claiming it led to unveiling more hidden secrets. Sky asserts Z of the truth behind the crimes committed by William, causing her to have a panic attack.
89	39	"Back to School"	"Denial"	December 28, 2023	5.2%
Gino confronts his father, who remained skeptical as he denied the accusations. Tania becomes frustrated with the lack of progress in Luna's case, but Sky assures her it will be resolved soon. Z revealed to her therapist that Luna has been haunting her dreams.
90	40	"Hope is Awake"	"Heartbroken"	December 29, 2023	4.1%
During her speech, Amanda exposes the secrets brought to light by Luna's case, particularly involving William. Archie reaches out to Poch, assuring him of his genuine intent to understand. Despite appearing indifferent, Roxy's distress becomes evident to Archie at the staircase.
91	41	"Take a Break"	"Hopeful"	January 1, 2024	4.6%
Obet shares his interest in Sky with Yosef but refrains from taking action. William’s lawyer told him that most of the victims and their families have accepted settlement and withdrew their case against him. Tim asks Poch for a break to figure things out.
92	42	"Unexpected Hero"	"Interested"	January 2, 2024	4.5%
Archie confronts his mom for lacking delicadeza after catching her leaving with Darius. Kenjie takes Roxy to a nightclub to distract her. Archie stops someone from drugging Roxy's drink. Roxy initially rejects Archie but, intoxicated, he insisted on driving her home, where they eventually had sex.
93	43	"Bad Decisions"	"First"	January 3, 2024	5.0%
Z took pills to stop seeing Luna in her dreams. Roxy left feeling frustrated after having sex with Archie. Darius reminds Obet of their owed favor. Police told Tania to stay in town due to her connection to Harry's disappearance. Harry's abandoned car is found by a street vendor, but with no sign of him.
94	44	"Abused Wife"	"Wrath"	January 4, 2024	5.2%
Lydia tried to pay rent, but Edith reveals Obet already did, raising suspicion. Gino tells Cecille that Luna and Poch had pens similar to the one found in William's office. Cecille then confronts William, where she accuses him of manipulating the DNA results to deflect suspicion.
95	45	"Comeback"	"Alive"	January 5, 2024	5.0%
Obet promproposes to Sky at her house but is rejected. He meets the group and discovers that his brother Tonio, is alive. He confronted him for not caring or revealing his existence, and where he reveals Lydia's cancer diagnosis. Later on, Obet is surprised by Harry's unexpected appearance.
96	46	"Rejected"	"Confrontation"	January 8, 2024	5.0%
Tonio contacts Lydia, assuring her not to worry more about him. Harry asks Obet about Darius' shipments, promising not to harm his brother. Roxy rejects Archie's promposal and runs away, feeling overwhelmed. Gino recalls his father suspiciously wanting him to end things with Luna.
97	47	"Prom Prep"	"Date"	January 9, 2024	4.4%
Gino learns more information from Poch and decides to meet Sky to discuss Luna and express his regret for not protecting her. Obet asks Sky to prom again, and she accepts. Students in Northford start getting ready for their prom.
98	48	"Prom Night"	"Prom"	January 10, 2024	5.2%
Z is left sulking when Sky and Obet's arrival steals the attention of their schoolmates. Roxy treads the path of letting go and forgiveness upon noticing how tense Tim is while Northford students have the time of their lives at their.
99	49	"Slow Dancing"	"Love"	January 11, 2024	5.2%
Love is in the air at the Northford High School's prom, but not for everyone. Worry fills Roxy's heart when she suddenly feels nauseous, while Z goes haywire after GIno rejects her anew. Obet enters into a risky deal with Harry.
100	50	"Another One Bites the Dust"	"Sacrifice"	January 12, 2024	4.8%
After Z unwittingly confesses to killing Luna, Obet resolves to take matters into his own hands as the Aguerro siblings attempt to flee. However, the pursuit comes with a great sacrifice for Obet.
101	51	"Unraveling"	"Protection"	January 15, 2024	5.7%
Vowing to seek justice for Luna and Obet, Sky begins looking for pieces of evidence against Z. Harry gives Sasha a bloodcurdling warning as he evicts his estranged wife out of his house. Archie recalls a crucial moment that can help his sister.
102	52	"Red Herring"	"Favor"	January 16, 2024	5.7%
Harry recalls the difficult decision he made the night Luna died in order to protect Z. After Gino's visit, William coerces Harry to help him escape prison. A nightmare jogs Z's memory about her half-sister's death.
103	53	"The Real Truth"	"Twist"	January 17, 2024	5.9%
Z musters all the strength and courage left in her body as she recollects everything she witnessed the night Luna died, revealing the identity of the person behind her and her half-sister's tragic fate.
104	54	"The Anti Hero"	"Killer"	January 18, 2024	6.5%
As the truth behind Luna's death comes to light, William goes to great lengths to evade punishment for his crimes and tries to drag Z down with him. Soon, Harry makes a sacrifice to protect his children.
105	55	"Karmic Retribution"	"Graduation"	January 19, 2024	6.7%
Sky and Z finally put an end to William's madness. Later, the Northford Senior High School students and their families embrace love, forgiveness, and reconciliation amid their graduation festivities.
