= Ransom Sherman =

American actor, radio and television personality and writer (1898-1985)

- Born: October 15, 1898; Appleton, Wisconsin U.S.
- Died: November 26, 1985 (aged 87); Henderson, Nevada, U.S.
- Occupation: Actor
- Spouse: Helen
- Children: 2

Ransom M. Sherman (October 15, 1898 - November 26, 1985) was an American actor, radio and television personality and writer. He was an actor, known for the films Are You with It? (1948) and Winter Meeting (1948) and the television series Father of the Bride (1961–1962). He died on 26 November 1985 in Henderson, Nevada, in the United States.

Early years == Sherman and his family moved from Appleton, Wisconsin, to Chicago when he was 14. He attended a technical school in Chicago, but singing began to interest him more than the school's offerings. That pleased his parents, both of whom were musicians — his father a violinist and his mother a pianist. He sang in an amateur production of The Mikado, but when he was in college he played double bass in the orchestra. He attended Michigan, Northwestern, and Ripon for his college studies but never graduated.

== Career ==
Sherman sold shoes at Marshall Field's and sang and played saxophone in clubs and at banquets in the Chicago area until he traveled to Europe in 1923. After he returned, he began selling insurance. When he visited radio station KYW to call on some prospects for policies, he became interested in radio. He continued to visit stations until, at age 33, one gave him an audition that resulted in a job.

One of Sherman's early radio shows was The Doctors, a comedy on which he cultivated his ability to ad-lib. Following that, he was on a variety show for a short time, after which he became master of ceremonies on Club Matinee on the Blue Network. He starred in, and wrote scripts for, Hap Hazard, a comedy-variety show that was the summer replacement for Fibber McGee and Molly on NBC radio in 1941. He retained the title role when Hap Hazard returned to the air in January 1942. He was also heard on Fibber McGee and Molly portraying Sigmund "Sig" Wellington, the manager of the Bijou Theater; as well as Molly McGee's seldom-heard drunk uncle Dennis. Ransom co-starred with Leo Carrillo in Fiesta Ranch, a comedy-musical radio program, in 1943. In 1944, he starred in Nitwit Court, the summer replacement for Duffy's Tavern.

Sherman worked in Hollywood for nine years, appearing in some films before he returned to Chicago. Films in which he appeared included Yankee Fakir, Whiplash (1949) and The Bachelor and the Bobby-Soxer (1947).

A visit to Dave Garroway's television program led him to try television. During the summer of 1950, he had a 30-minute program five nights a week on NBC. Radio and TV columnist Larry Wolters described the show as "a light and airy thirty minutes of whimsical humor, gentle satire, bewildering non sequiturs, and a grab-bag of nonsense and foolishness". A feature of the summer program was Sherman's parodying of how-to-do-it segments of TV shows. An article in Life magazine described Sherman's character in the segments as "the most appallingly inefficient Mr. Fixit who ever nailed his thumb to a board." In October 1950, he began the Ransom Sherman Show, which originated at WNBQ in Chicago and was broadcast on NBC-TV Monday through Friday afternoons. That program lasted three months. During the 1961–1962 television season, he played Herbert Dunston on the CBS situation comedy Father of the Bride.

== Personal life ==
Sherman and his wife, Helen, had a son and a daughter.
