= Club Matinee =

American radio show

- Country of origin: United States
- Language: English
- Syndicates: Blue Network (1937-1943); ABC (1945-1946)
- Starring: Ransom Sherman; Garry Moore
- Announcer: Durward Kirby
- Original release: 1937 – 1946

Club Matinee is an American old-time radio variety show. It was broadcast on the NBC Blue Network from 1937 to 1943 and on ABC from 1945 to 1946.

== Format ==
Club Matinee featured comedy and music, with the two sometimes combined in the form of "comedic arrangements of musical classics, played slightly out of tune."

Francis Chase Jr., in his book Sound and Fury: An Informal History of Broadcasting, described Club Matinee as being unique in its approach to comedy. He wrote, "Here is a zany piece of merriment, inauspiciously insinuated into your afternoon listening, which has become the most haphazard, the screwiest, the most anything-can-happen-affair to hit the air waves." He added that the program discovered, developed and built "new and different comedy which, sooner or later, finds its way onto the big commercial shows."

== Personnel ==
Ransom Sherman was the first host of the program, with Garry Moore (who was added in 1939) eventually becoming co-host.

Moore's stage name changed during his time on Club Matinee, and the change involved the program. When he decided that Thomas Garrison Morfit (his real name) was too cumbersome for broadcasting, he had a contest on the program, asking listeners to send in suggestions for a name that he could use. A woman in Pittsburgh won the $50 prize with her suggestion of Garry Moore.

Singers who appeared on the program included Annette King, Nancy Martin, Clark Dennis, Johnny Johnston, Evelyn Lynne, Phil Shukin, the Escorts and Betty, the Three Romeos, and Sam Cowling. Durward Kirby was the announcer, and Rex Maupin provided the music.
