= Forever Amber =

Forever Amber may refer to:

- Forever Amber (novel), 1944 historical romance novel by Kathleen Winsor
- Forever Amber (film), 1947 film adaptation of the novel
