= Bide =

Bide may refer to:

- Bïde, an indigenous people of Brazil
- Bïde language, a language of Brazil
- An early reference to Al Bidda in Qatar calls the location "Bide"
- BIDE model, a model used in population ecology
- Austin Bide (1915–2008), British chemist and industrialist
- Alcebíades Barcelos (1902–1975), also known as Bide, Brazilian samba musician and composer
- Bao Bide (born 1948), American historian and sinologist
- Bide Dudley (1877–1944), American critic and playwright

== See also ==
- Sass & bide, a fashion label
- Bidet
