= Kathleen Winsor =

American novelist (1915–2003)

- Born: October 13, 1915; Olivia, Minnesota, U.S.
- Died: May 26, 2003 (aged 87); New York City, U.S.
- Education: University of California, Berkeley
- Occupation: Author
- Spouse(s): Bob Herwig (div. 1946) Artie Shaw (m. 1946; ann. 1948) Arnold Krakower (div. 1953) Paul A. Porter (m. 1956; died 1975)
- Writing career
- Genre: Novels
- Notable works: Forever Amber; Star Money

Kathleen Winsor (October 13, 1915 – May 26, 2003) was an American author. She is best known for her first work, the 1944 historical novel Forever Amber. The novel, racy for its time, became a runaway bestseller even as it drew criticism from some authorities for its depictions of sexuality. She wrote seven other novels, none of which matched the success of her debut.

== Early life ==
Winsor was born on October 13, 1915, in Olivia, Minnesota, but raised in Berkeley, California. Her father was a real-estate dealer. At the age of 18, she made a list of her goals for life. Among those was her hope to write a best-selling novel. She graduated in 1938 from the University of California, Berkeley. During her school years, she married a fellow student, All-American college football player Robert Herwig. In 1937, she began writing a thrice-weekly sports column for the Oakland Tribune. Although that job only lasted a year, Winsor remained at the newspaper, working as a receptionist. She was fired in 1938 when the newspaper chose to trim its workforce.

== Career ==
=== Forever Amber ===
Winsor became interested in the Restoration period through her husband. Herwig was writing a paper for school on Charles II, and, out of boredom, Winsor read one of his research books.

Her husband joined the military at the outbreak of World War II and spent five years with the United States Marines fighting in the Pacific theatre. During that time, Winsor studied the Restoration period, claiming to have read 356 books on the subject. She began writing a novel based on her research. Her fifth draft of the novel was accepted for publication. The publishers promptly edited the book down to one-fifth of its original size. The resulting novel, Forever Amber, was 972 pages long. The book appeared in 1944. It attracted criticism for its blatant sexual references. Fourteen U.S. states banned it as pornography and the Hays Office also condemned it, but within a month the movie rights had been purchased by Twentieth Century Fox. The film, directed by Otto Preminger and starring Linda Darnell and Cornel Wilde, was released in 1947.

Despite being banned, Forever Amber became one of the bestselling American novels of the 1940s. It sold over 100,000 copies in its first week of release, and went on to sell over three million copies.

=== Later career ===
Made a celebrity by the success of her novel, Winsor found it unthinkable to return to the married life she had known with Herwig and, in 1946, they divorced. Ten days later, she became the sixth wife of the big-band leader and clarinetist Artie Shaw, despite the fact that two years previously Shaw had castigated his then-wife, Ava Gardner, for reading such a "trashy novel" as Forever Amber. The marriage to Shaw ended in 1948, and Winsor soon married her divorce attorney, Arnold Krakower. That marriage likewise ended in divorce, in 1953. In 1956, Winsor married for the fourth time, to Paul A. Porter, a former head of the Federal Communications Commission. They remained married until Porter's death in 1975.

Winsor's next commercially successful novel, Star Money, appeared in 1950, and was a portrait closely drawn from her experience of becoming a bestselling author. But in five subsequent novels, the last appearing in 1986 – The Lovers, Calais, Robert and Arabella, Jacintha, and Wanderers Eastward, Wanderers West – she failed to make as much of an impact. In 2000, a new edition of Forever Amber was published with a foreword by Barbara Taylor Bradford.

== Death ==
Winsor died May 26, 2003, in New York City, aged 87.

== Works ==
- Forever Amber (1944) ISBN 0-14-100982-9
- Star Money (1950) ISBN 0-451-02708-6
- The Lovers (1952) ISBN 0-552-07118-8
- America, With Love (1954) ISBN 0-451-01600-9
- Wanderers Eastward, Wanderers West (1965) ISBN 0-8217-5033-X
- Calais (1979) ISBN 0-385-14865-8
- Jacintha (1984) ISBN 0-517-55201-9
- Robert and Arabella (1986) ISBN 0-517-56078-X

== Papers ==
Winsor's manuscripts and research from 1940 to 1949 are at The Harry Ransom Humanities Research Center at the University of Texas at Austin.
