= Tex McCrary =

American journalist (1910–2003)

- Born: John Reagan McCrary Jr. October 13, 1910; Calvert, Texas, U.S.
- Died: July 29, 2003 (aged 92); New York City, U.S.
- Education: Yale University
- Occupations: journalist, public relations specialist, inventor of the talk show genre for television and radio
- Political party: Republican
- Spouses: Sarah Brisbane (m. 1934; div. 1939) Jinx Falkenburg (m. 1945; sep. 1980)
- Children: 3
- Relatives: Arthur Brisbane (father-in-law)

John Reagan "Tex" McCrary Jr. (October 13, 1910 – July 29, 2003) was an American journalist and public relations specialist. He popularized the talk show genre for television and radio along with his wife, Jinx Falkenburg, with whom he hosted the first radio talk show, Meet Tex and Jinx, as well as the radio show Hi Jinx and the television talk shows At Home and The Swift Home Service Club.

== Life and career ==
McCrary was born in Calvert, Texas. He graduated from the Phillips Exeter Academy in 1928 and from Yale University in 1932, where he served as chairman of campus humor magazine The Yale Record. He was a member of both Delta Kappa Epsilon fraternity and Skull and Bones, where his club nickname was "Sancho Panza".

McCrary was interviewed by newspaper editor Arthur Brisbane while McCrary was editor of the Yale Record. Brisbane hired McCrary for the New York Daily Mirror after his graduation in 1932.

In 1934, McCrary married Brisbane's daughter Sarah. During their honeymoon in the Bahamas, McCrary designed the format of the Daily Mirror tabloid, which he was to edit until he joined the United States Army Air Forces (later the U.S. Air Force) in a public relations capacity. He flew many bomber sorties with the Eighth Air Force and was involved in the invasion of Sicily. He became a captain.

McCrary was then tasked with putting together a team of airborne war correspondents to cover the Twentieth Air Force. The press corps toured Europe in the weeks after V-E Day in a custom B-17 fitted with high-powered shortwave radio equipment. They started with Paris and moved on to examine first-hand the destruction from the Allied bombing campaigns on Hamburg and Dresden. That September, they were among the first Americans to enter Hiroshima after the atomic bombing. McCrary advised journalists not to cover the bombing, because he felt that the American people could not face the reality of the effects of the bombing, but John Hersey still covered the story in The New Yorker. Over the following few months the group toured Asia, making stops in China, French Indochina, Thailand, Burma, the Malay States and Java.

A staunch Republican, McCrary played a major role in convincing Dwight Eisenhower to run for the U.S. presidency in 1952. According to Richard Kluger's The Paper, McCrary was responsible for John Hay Whitney's purchase of the former New York Herald Tribune.

McCrary also had connections to real estate magnate William Zeckendorf Sr., and provided promotional assistance to Freedomland U.S.A., a popular theme park located on several hundred acres of Zeckendorf property in The Bronx. McCrary and his wife are featured in the book Freedomland U.S.A.: The Definitive History (Theme Park Press, 2019).

McCrary died in New York City.

== Sources ==
- Charles J. Kelly, Tex McCrary: Wars, Women, Politics: An Adventurous Life Across the Twentieth Century (Hamilton Books 2009, ISBN 978-0-7618-4455-6)
