= Linda Darnell =

American actress (1923–1965)

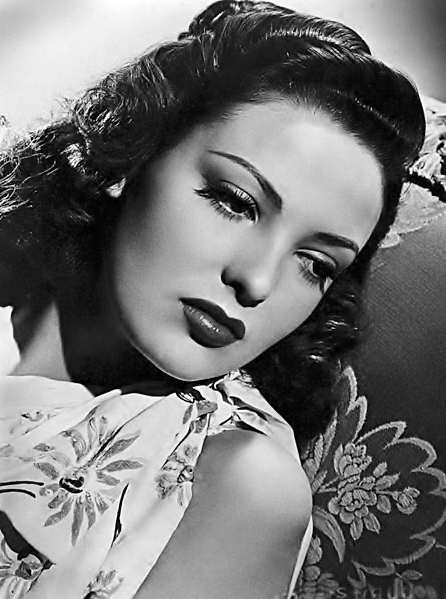
- Darnell, c. 1940s
- Born: Monetta Eloyse Darnell; October 16, 1923; Dallas, Texas, U.S.
- Died: April 10, 1965 (aged 41); Chicago, Illinois, U.S.
- Resting place: Union Hill Cemetery, Kennett Square, Pennsylvania, U.S.
- Occupation: Actress
- Years active: 1939–1965
- Known for: Forever Amber; Unfaithfully Yours; A Letter to Three Wives
- Spouses: Peverell Marley (m. 1943; div. 1951) Phillip Liebmann (m. 1954; div. 1955) Merle Roy Robertson (m. 1957; div. 1963)
- Children: 1
- Awards: Hollywood Walk of Fame; Six Photoplay Awards

Linda Darnell (born Monetta Eloyse Darnell; October 16, 1923 – April 10, 1965) was an American actress. Darnell progressed from modeling as a child to acting in theatre and film. At the encouragement of her mother, she made her first film in 1939, and appeared in both lead and supporting roles in big-budget films for 20th Century Fox throughout the 1940s. She co-starred with Tyrone Power in four films, including the classic The Mark of Zorro (1940). Her biggest commercial success was the controversial Forever Amber (1947), an adaptation of the best-selling novel of the 1940s and Fox's biggest hit of 1947. She won critical acclaim for her work in Summer Storm (1944), Hangover Square (1945), Fallen Angel (1945), Unfaithfully Yours (1948), A Letter to Three Wives (1949), and No Way Out (1950).

== Early life ==
Darnell was born in Dallas, Texas, as one of four children (excluding her mother's two children from an earlier marriage) to postal clerk Calvin Roy Darnell and the former Margaret "Pearl" Brown. One of her maternal great-grandparents was Cherokee. She was the younger sister of Undeen and the older sister of Monte Maloya and Calvin Roy, Jr. Her parents were not happily married, and she grew up as a shy and reserved girl in a house of domestic turmoil. Starting at an early age, her mother, Pearl, had big plans for Darnell in the entertainment industry. She believed that Linda was her only child with potential as an actress and ignored the rearing of her other children.

According to her siblings, Darnell enjoyed the limelight and shared her mother's dream. Darnell once said, "Mother really shoved me along, spotting me in one contest after another. I had no great talent, and I didn't want to be a movie star particularly, but Mother had always wanted it for herself, and I guess she attained it through me." One elocution teacher recalled: "[Darnell] didn't stand out particularly, except that she was so sweet and considerate. In her theater work, she wasn't outstanding, but her mother was right behind her everywhere she went."

Unlike her husband, Pearl had a notorious reputation in the neighborhood of being "aggressive" or "downright mean". Despite some financial problems, Darnell insisted that she had a joyful childhood and loving parents. Darnell was a model by the age of 11 and was acting on the stage by the age of 13. She initially started modeling to earn money for the household and performed mostly in beauty contests.

Before leaving school for Hollywood, Darnell was a student at Sunset High School, which she entered in September 1937, majoring in Spanish and art. She did not have a lot in common with her peers and usually spent her time at home as a teen, working under the guidance of her mother. In 1936, she entered the Dallas Little Theater and was cast in the southwestern premiere of Murder in the Cathedral. In 1937, she was hired as one of the Texanita hostesses at the Greater Texas & Pan-American Exposition.

In November 1937, a talent scout for 20th Century Fox arrived in Dallas looking for new faces. Encouraged by her mother, Darnell met him, and after a few months, he invited her for a screen test in Hollywood. Arriving in California alongside Mary Healy and Dorris Bowdon in February 1938, Darnell initially was rejected by film studios and was sent home because the 14-year-old was declared "too young."

== Career beginnings ==
Although originally wanting to become an actress on the stage, Darnell was featured in a Gateway to Hollywood talent search and initially landed a contract at RKO Pictures. The job had no certainty, though, and she soon returned to Dallas. When 20th Century-Fox offered her a part, Darnell wanted to accept, but RKO was unwilling to release her. Nevertheless, by age 15, she was signed to a contract at 20th Century-Fox and moved to a small apartment in Hollywood, all alone, on April 5, 1939. With production beginning in April 1939, she was featured in her first film, Hotel for Women (1939), which had newspapers immediately hailing her as the newest star of Hollywood. Loretta Young was originally assigned to play the role, but she demanded a salary that the studio would not give her. Darryl F. Zanuck instead cast Darnell "because he felt that the name would advertise her beauty and suggest a Latin quality that matched her coloring."

Although only 15 at the time, Darnell posed as a 17-year-old and was listed as 19 years old by the studio. According to columnist Louella O. Parsons, Darnell was "so young, so immature and so naive in her ideas" and was very loyal to her boss, Darryl F. Zanuck. Her true age came out later in 1939, and she became one of the few actresses under the age of 16 to serve as leading ladies in films. While working on Hotel for Women, Darnell was cast alongside Henry Fonda and Claudette Colbert in Drums Along the Mohawk (1939) in June 1939. She was later replaced because the studio felt her role was not important enough. In an interview during production of Hotel for Women, which lasted until June, Darnell admitted that movie making was not what she expected: "I'm learning what really hard work is. At home in Dallas, I used to sprawl on the lawn and dream about the nice, easy time the screen stars must be having in Hollywood, but the last two months have taught me quite another story."

Since the beginning of her career at 20th Century-Fox, Darnell had been very positive about her frequent co-star Tyrone Power. In a 1939 interview, she expressed her interest in starring opposite Power in Johnny Apollo (1940). Rationalizing why she was not cast, Darnell said: "It's a man's part and the girl's role is only incidental." Dorothy Lamour was cast, instead. Nevertheless, Darnell had her way. She was assigned to the female lead opposite Power in the light romantic comedy Day-Time Wife (1939). Although the film received only slightly favorable reviews, Darnell's performance was received positively, with one critic saying: "Despite her apparent youth, [Darnell] turns in an outstanding performance when playing with popular players." Another critic wrote: "little Linda is not only a breath-taking eyeful, but a splendid actress, as well." Life stated that Darnell appeared to be 22 and was "the most physically perfect girl in Hollywood". Following the film's release, she was cast in the drama comedy Star Dust in December 1939. The film was hailed as one of the "most original entertainment idea[s] in years" and boosted Darnell's popularity, who was nicknamed "Hollywood's loveliest and most exciting star". Variety said: "Miss Darnell displays a wealth of youthful charm and personality that confirms studio efforts to build her to a draw personality." Her studio contract had been revised to allow Darnell to earn US$200 a week (equivalent to $4,600 in 2025).

== Stardom ==
At first, everything was like a fairy tale coming true. I stepped into a fabulous land where, overnight, I was a movie star. In pictures you're built up by everyone. On the set, in the publicity office, wherever you go, everyone says you're wonderful. It gives you a false sense of security. You waltz through a role, and everywhere you hear that you are beautiful and lovely, a natural-born actress. You believe what people around you say.

After appearing in several small films, the 16-year-old Darnell was cast in her first big-budget film in May 1940, appearing again opposite Tyrone Power in Brigham Young (1940), which was shot on location in mid-1940 and was regarded as the most expensive film 20th Century Fox had yet produced. Darnell and Power were cast together for the second time owing to the box-office success of Day-Time Wife, and they became a highly publicized onscreen couple, which prompted Darryl F. Zanuck to add 18 more romantic scenes to Brigham Young. The film's director, Henry Hathaway, in later life had only slight memories of Darnell, but recalled that "a sweeter girl never lived." By June 1940, shortly after completing Brigham Young, Darnell earned "a weekly salary larger than most bank officials."

In the summer of 1940, Darnell began working on The Mark of Zorro (1940), in which she again co-starred as Power's sweetheart in a role for which Anne Baxter was previously considered. A big-budget adventure film that was raved over by the critics, The Mark of Zorro was a box-office sensation and did much to enhance Darnell's star status. Afterwards, she was paired with Henry Fonda for the first time in the Western Chad Hanna (1940), her first Technicolor film. The film received only moderate attention, unlike Darnell's next film, Blood and Sand (1941), which was shot on location in Mexico and in which the 17-year-old was reunited with Power. It was the first film for which she was widely critically acclaimed. Nevertheless, Darnell later claimed that her downfall began after Blood and Sand. In an interview, she said:

People got tired of seeing the sweet young things I was playing and I landed at the bottom of the roller coaster. The change and realization were very subtle. I'd had the fame and money every girl dreams about—and the romance. I'd crammed thirty years into ten, and while it was exciting and I would do it over again, I still know I missed out on my girlhood, the fun, little things that now seem important.

The studio was unable to find Darnell suitable roles. In late 1940, Fox chose her for the main role in Song of the Islands (1942), a Hawaiian musical film which eventually starred Betty Grable. After Blood and Sand, she was set to co-star with Claudette Colbert in Remember the Day (1941), but another actress was eventually cast. Meanwhile, she was considered for the female lead in Swamp Water (1941), but Anne Baxter was later assigned the role. Darnell was disappointed and felt rejected; ignoring the fact that she had taken the female lead in The Mark of Zorro the previous year, for which Baxter was being considered, Darnell later lamented: "Right under your very nose someone else is brought in for that prize part you wanted so terribly." Months passed by without any work, and in August 1941, the still 17-year-old was cast in a supporting role in the musical Rise and Shine (1941). The film was a setback in her career, and she was rejected for a later role because she refused to respond to Darryl F. Zanuck's advances. Instead, she contributed to the war effort, working for the Red Cross and selling war bonds. She was also a regular at the Hollywood Canteen.

== Professional setbacks ==
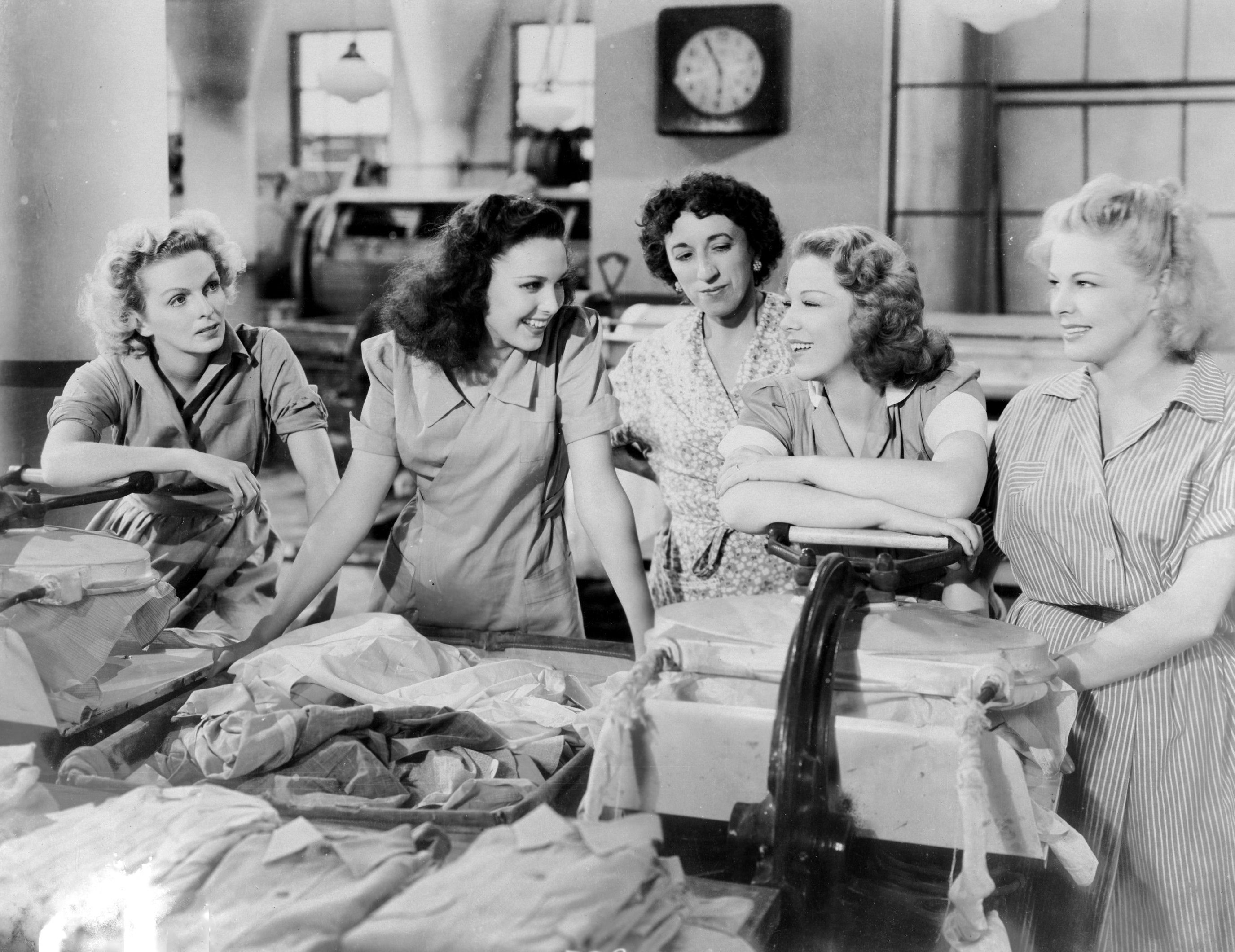
(L-R): Doris Dudley, Linda Darnell, Margaret Hamilton, Glenda Farrell, and Leslie Brooks in City Without Men (1943)

In early 1942, Darnell filmed The Loves of Edgar Allan Poe, another film that did little to advance her career. Meanwhile, she realized that Darryl F. Zanuck had lost interest in her, and she was overlooked for most film roles for which she felt suited. Instead, she was cast in roles that she loathed, including the musical Orchestra Wives (1942). Zanuck insisted that she take the role, but she was replaced by Ann Rutherford after 12 days of shooting, with the press reporting that "Linda Darnell and Twentieth Century-Fox aren't on the best of terms at the moment." As a punishment, she was lent out to another studio for a supporting role in a B movie called City Without Men (1943). According to co-star Rosemary DeCamp, Darnell nevertheless was "very polite", and she was satisfied to work at a studio that did not treat the 18-year-old as a child. In April 1943, she was put on suspension, which meant being replaced in the Technicolor musical film The Gang's All Here (1943). By this time, Darnell had eloped, which caused Zanuck to be even more furious.

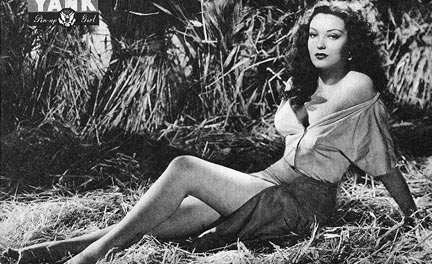
Linda Darnell, aged 20, in a May 1944 pin-up photo for Yank, the Army Weekly

In 1943, she was cast, uncredited, as the Virgin Mary in The Song of Bernadette. By late 1943, Darnell was fed up with critics only praising her beauty rather than her acting abilities. Judging her performance in Sweet and Low-Down (1944), in which she co-starred with Lynn Bari, one critic from the Los Angeles Examiner wrote, "Lynn comes off the best because she has more of a chance to shine. Linda just doesn't have enough to do—but looks beautiful doing it." Darnell was reduced to second leads and was overlooked for big-budget productions. Matters changed when she was named one of the four most beautiful women in Hollywood along with Hedy Lamarr, Ingrid Bergman, and Gene Tierney in a 1944 edition of Look. Afterwards, the studio allowed her to be lent out for the lead in Summer Storm. Portraying a "seductive peasant girl who takes three men to their ruin before she herself is murdered," it was a type of role she had never before played. In a later interview, Darnell commented:

I was told that such a violent change of type might ruin my career, but I insisted on taking the chance. [...] This is one picture on which I am setting much store for the future. For eighteen months I did nothing in pictures. I pleaded for something to do, but nothing happened. The character in the Chekhov film is a wild sort of she-devil, which any actress would go miles to play. She's devil mostly—at times angelic—and perfectly fascinating to interpret. I'm counting on my Russian girl to give me a new start.

Released in 1944, the film provided her a new screen image as a pin-up girl. Shortly after, Darnell was again lent out to portray a showgirl in The Great John L., the first film to feature her bare legs. Darnell complained that the studio lacked recognition of her, which prodded Zanuck to cast her in Hangover Square (1945), wherein she played a role she personally had chosen. The film became a great success, and with Darnell's triumph assured, she was allowed to abandon her upcoming film, Don Juan Quilligan (1945), which would have been another low point in her career. In January 1945, the now 21-year-old adult was added to the cast of the film noir Fallen Angel (1945), which also included Dana Andrews and Alice Faye. Despite suffering from the "terrifying" director Otto Preminger, Darnell completed the film and was praised by reviewers so widely that even talk of an Oscar nomination arose. Because of her success in Fallen Angel, she was cast opposite Tyrone Power in Captain from Castile in December 1945 on the insistence of Joseph L. Mankiewicz. Although she looked forward to the film project, believing it would be her most important to date, she was later replaced by newcomer Jean Peters owing to scheduling conflicts, a decision she resented.

In 1946, Darnell filmed two pictures simultaneously, the expensively budgeted Anna and the King of Siam and Preminger's Centennial Summer. During the release of the latter, she was on location in Monument Valley for the filming of the John Ford Western My Darling Clementine (1946), playing a role for which she lost 12 pounds. She was assigned to a negligible role by Zanuck, despite Ford feeling she was not suitable for the role.

== Renewed success ==
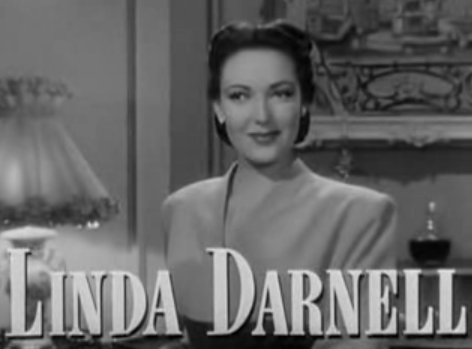
From A Letter to Three Wives (1949)

In 1946, Darnell won the starring role in the highly anticipated movie Forever Amber, based on a bestselling historical novel that was denounced as being immoral at that time. The character Amber was so named because of her hair color, and this is the only major film in which Darnell—normally known for her raven hair and somewhat Latin looks—appears as a redhead. It was the most expensive film so far produced by Fox, and publicity at the time compared the novel to 1939 film Gone with the Wind. Darnell replaced British actress Peggy Cummins in July 1946 at a cost of US$350,000 (equivalent to $5.8 million in 2025). Because $1 million (equivalent to $16.5 million in 2025) had already been spent on production costs when Darnell was brought in, the pressure was intense to make the film a financial success. Her casting was a result of a campaign for stronger roles. Regardless, she was surprised to find out that she had been cast, because she had been intensively rehearsing for Captain from Castile at the time. Although she had to give up that role and work with Otto Preminger, she was delighted to play the title role and thought she was "the luckiest girl in Hollywood."

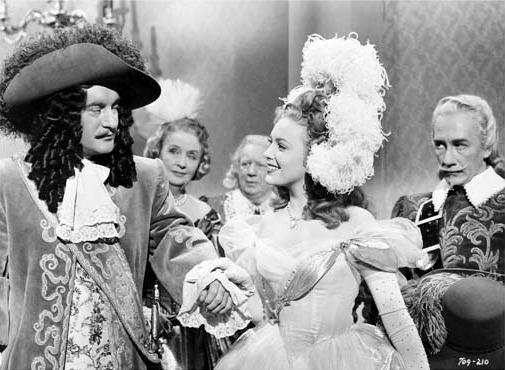
(L-R): George Sanders, Linda Darnell and Richard Haydn in Forever Amber (1947)

The search for the actress to portray Amber, a beauty who uses men to make her fortune in 17th-century England, was modeled on the extensive process that led to the casting of Vivien Leigh as Scarlett O'Hara for Gone with the Wind. Production demanded a lot from Darnell. She was again put on a diet and was assigned to a voice coach to learn how to speak with an English accent. In addition, she spent hours in fittings for costume changes. Darnell was certain that Forever Amber would be her ticket to stardom, and she told reporters:

My first seven years in Hollywood were a series of discouraging struggles for me. For a while it looked as though the Darnell-versus-Hollywood tussle was going to find Darnell coming out second best. The next seven years aren't going to be the same.

Darnell worked long hours at the studio during filming, and according to her older sister, she started loathing Preminger, which did not ease production. This and the heavy dieting resulted in exhaustion and a serious illness in November 1946. Her shooting schedule lasted until March 1947, and she collapsed on the set twice. Forever Amber did not live up to its hype, and although it became a success at the box office, most reviewers agreed that the film was a disappointment. Darnell was disappointed in the film's reception; it did not gain her the recognition she desired.

The following year, Darnell portrayed Daphne de Carter in Preston Sturges' comedy Unfaithfully Yours (1948), also starring Rex Harrison, and was then rushed into production as one of the three wives in the comedy/drama A Letter to Three Wives (1949). Darnell's hard-edged performance in the latter won her unanimous acclaim and the best reviews of her career. Darnell became one of the most in-demand actresses in Hollywood, and she now had the freedom to select her own roles. That same year, she also portrayed Algeria Wedge in The Walls of Jericho, directed by John M. Stahl and costarring Cornel Wilde, Kirk Douglas, and Anne Baxter. She longed for the leading role in the controversial film Pinky (1949), but Zanuck feared that her character would be compared to Amber by the audience, and A Letter to Three Wives co-star Jeanne Crain was cast, instead.

Darnell had been widely expected to win an Academy Award nomination for A Letter to Three Wives. When this did not happen, her career began to wane. She was cast opposite Richard Widmark and Veronica Lake in Slattery's Hurricane (1949), which she perceived as a step down from the level she had reached with A Letter to Three Wives, though it did well at the box office.

== Later career ==
Aside from her co-starring role opposite Richard Widmark, Stephen McNally, and Sidney Poitier in the noir No Way Out (1950), directed by Joseph L. Mankiewicz, which she later called "the only good picture I ever made," her later films were rarely noteworthy, and her appearances were increasingly sporadic. Further hampering Darnell's career was the actress's alcoholism and weight gain. Her next film was a Western, Two Flags West (1950). Due to her allergy to horses, she loathed making Westerns, and in addition to her complaints about her "colorless" role, she disliked her co-stars Joseph Cotten and Cornel Wilde. She was even less enthusiastic about her next film, The 13th Letter (1951), which reunited her with Preminger, and she only took the role because it was an unglamorous one. Shortly after its release, she was put on suspension for refusing a role in the film The Guy Who Came Back (1951) opposite Paul Douglas and Joan Bennett because it felt "too similar." She later consented to take on the glamour role, but she refused to bleach her hair for it.

On March 21, 1951, Darnell signed a new contract with 20th Century Fox that allowed her to become a freelance actress. Her first film outside 20th Century-Fox was The Lady Pays Off for Universal-International (1951) after Douglas Sirk requested her for the lead role. She was responsible for putting the film behind schedule because on the fifth day of shooting, she learned that Ivan Kahn, the man responsible for her breakthrough, had died. After The Lady Pays Off, Darnell headed the cast of Saturday Island (1952), which was filmed on location in Jamaica in late 1951. There, Darnell fell ill and had to be quarantined for several weeks. Because her contract required her to make one film a year for the studio, she reported to the 20th Century-Fox lot in March 1952 and was cast in the film noir Night Without Sleep (1952). It was the only time that she had to live up to this part of her contract, although she was released from it in September 1952.

This news initially excited Darnell because it permitted her to focus on her film career in Europe. She soon realized, though, that the ease and protection enjoyed under contract was gone, and she came to resent 20th Century-Fox and Zanuck:

Suppose you'd been earning $4,000 to $5,000 a week for years. Suddenly you were fired and no one would hire you at any figure remotely comparable to your previous salary. I thought in a little while I'd get offers from other studios, but not many came along. The only thing I knew how to do was be a movie star. No one expects to last forever in this business. You know that sooner or later the studio's going to let you go. But who wants to be retired at twenty-nine?

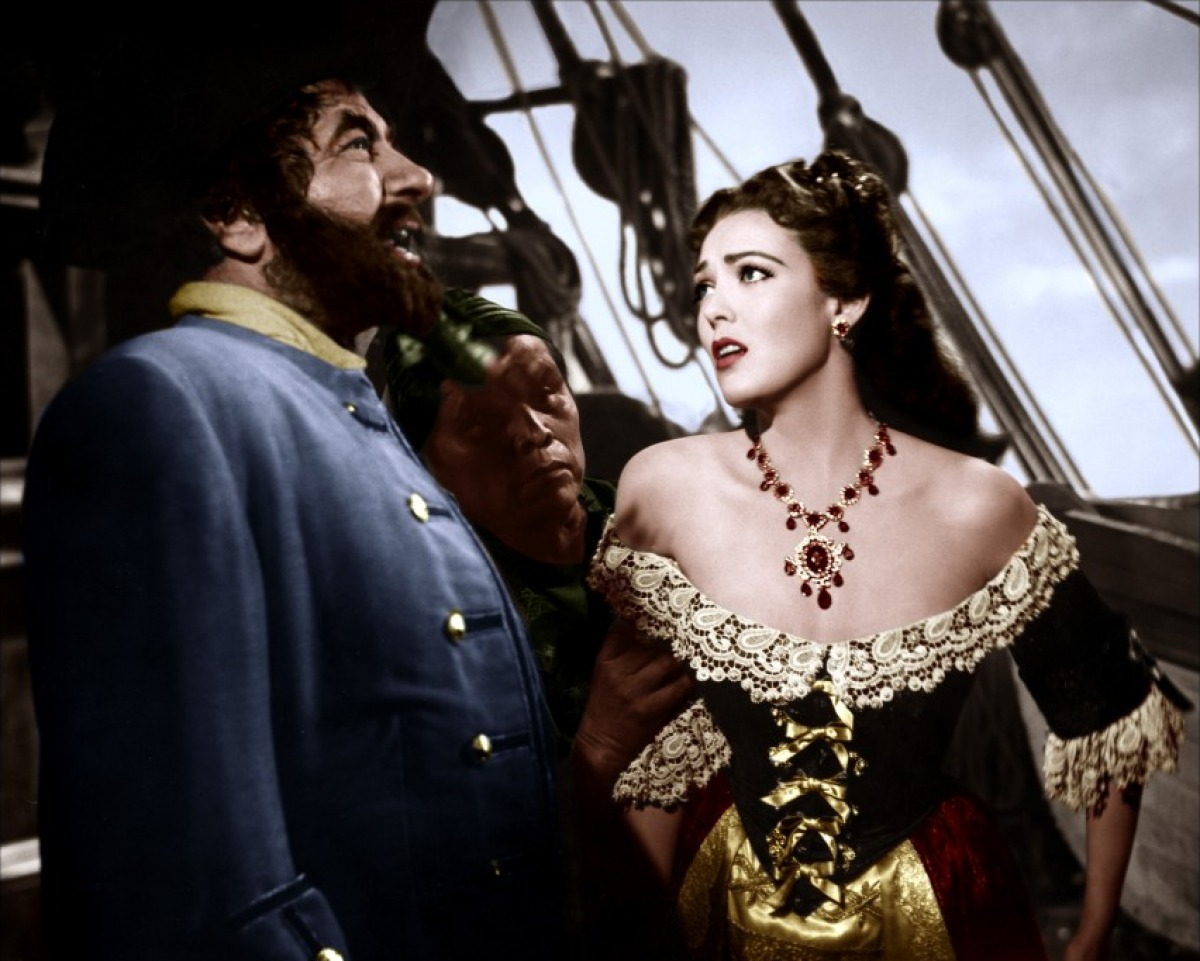
Darnell and Robert Newton in Blackbeard the Pirate

Before traveling to Italy for a two-picture deal with Giuseppe Amato, Darnell was rushed into the production of Blackbeard the Pirate (1952), which—much to Darnell's distress—got far behind schedule. She arrived in Italy in August 1952 and started filming Angels of Darkness (1954) in February of the next year. The second collaboration proved disastrous, and the next film was never released in the United States. Owing to a delay in the middle of production, she was sent back to Hollywood and there accepted an offer from Howard Hughes to star in RKO's 3-D film Second Chance (1953), filmed in Mexico. Afterwards, she flew back to Rome to complete Angels of Darkness, in which she spoke Italian. Upon returning to New York, she was under the misunderstanding that she would portray the title role in Mankiewicz's The Barefoot Contessa (1954), believing that the role could carry her to dramatic heights. Through trade papers, she learned that Ava Gardner assumed the part.

Because of her then-husband, Philip Liebmann (grandson of Charles Liebmann of Rheingold Breweries), Darnell put her career on hiatus. She returned to 20th Century-Fox in August 1955, by which time the studio had entered the television field. Darnell was eager to appear on Ronald Reagan's General Electric Theater. In 1958, Darnell appeared in the episode "Kid on a Calico Horse" of NBC's Cimarron City along with a cast of other guest stars, including Edgar Buchanan. That same year, she appeared in two episodes of NBC's Wagon Train, guest-starring as the title character in "The Dora Gray Story", reprising the role, now as the married Dora Gray Fogleberry, in "The Sacramento Story".

In addition to television, Darnell returned to the stage. Her last work as an actress was in a stage production in Atlanta in early 1965. (At the time of her death a few months later, she was preparing to perform in another play.)

== Personal life ==
Since Darnell was underaged when she arrived in Hollywood, she was tutored on set. She planned on attending graduation ceremonies at Sunset High School, but she was excluded from them and instead graduated from University High School in 1941. Her work schedules prohibited her from enrolling in a university. She is a member of the Sunset High School Hall of Fame.

In 1940, during the shooting of Star Dust, Darnell for a short time dated teen idol Mickey Rooney. Her first love was Jaime Jorba, a Hispanic youth whom she met while still in high school. They met again during production of Blood and Sand, but they drifted apart when Jorba announced he could not marry a girl who was in the public eye. Starting at age 17, Darnell dated her publicity agent, Alan Gordon, whom she allegedly married in a double wedding with Lana Turner and Joseph Stephen Crane on July 17, 1942. The report turned out to be false, and over the years, Darnell became known as "filmland's most eligible bachelorette." Up to 1942, she dated Kay Kyser, Eddie Albert, George Montgomery, and Jackie Cooper, among others. At one point, she was set to elope with talent agent Vic Orsatti, only to report later that she was "concentrating on [her] career."

Although a well-loved figure on the 20th Century-Fox lot among the cast, crew, and lot workers, Darnell reportedly made only one good friend in Hollywood, actress-singer Ann Miller, whom she met at a Catalina Island benefit. Darnell was very negative about the Hollywood social scene, finding it "nauseating". During her stay in Hollywood, her relationship with her mother, Pearl, worsened. Her mother was an unpopular figure on the lot because of her overbearing and possessive behavior. In 1940, Pearl accused her husband of having an incestuous relationship with Evelyn, one of her children - he was not Evelyn's biological father. Following an intense fight between her parents in 1942, Darnell left home with her younger sister Monte and never returned. Out of spite, Pearl turned to the press, which gained Darnell some bad publicity.

In 1942, Darnell was plagued with extortion letters from an unknown person threatening her with bodily harm unless a sum of US$2,000 (equivalent to $39,400 in 2025) was paid immediately. The studio asked the FBI to protect the actress, and eventually, a 17-year-old high school student was arrested for the crime.

On April 18, 1943 at age 19, Darnell eloped with 42-year-old cameraman Peverell Marley in Las Vegas. Darnell and Marley started seeing each other in 1940, and the press referred to him as her "devoted friend and escort." Most friends and relatives, including her parents, and 20th Century-Fox disapproved of the marriage, and Darnell was believed to look at Marley more as a father figure than as a romantic interest. Marley was a heavy drinker and introduced Darnell to alcohol in 1944, which eventually led to an addiction and weight problems. Neighbors and acquaintances recalled the drastic change she underwent during this period, becoming hardened and hot-tempered. In 1946, during production of Centennial Summer, she repeatedly met with Howard Hughes. Although she initially disavowed gossip regarding an affair, she fell in love with the womanizing millionaire and separated from Marley shortly after finishing My Darling Clementine. When Hughes announced that he had no desire to marry her, Darnell returned to her husband and cancelled divorce proceedings. Shortly after the reunion, her health worsened due to conditions in the production of Forever Amber (1947).

Because Darnell and Marley were unable to have children, they adopted a daughter in 1948, the actress's only child. She also planned to adopt a boy within a few years, but nothing ever came of it. In mid-1948, she became romantically involved with Joseph L. Mankiewicz, the director of A Letter to Three Wives, and in July 1948, she filed for divorce. Mankiewicz, however, was unwilling to leave his wife for Darnell, and while the affair continued for six years, she returned to her husband. Though she called him the "great love of her life", Mankiewicz never acknowledged the affair; he only mentioned her to his biographer as a "marvelous girl with very terrifying personal problems". In 1949, Darnell went into psychotherapy for hostile emotions that she had been building since childhood. Darnell's romance with Mankiewicz influenced her personal life. When he left in late 1949 for on-location shooting of All About Eve (1950), Darnell fell into a depression and almost committed suicide. She continued to meet with him occasionally until production of The Barefoot Contessa (1954) started.

On January 25, 1949, Darnell went to court to sue her former business manager, Cy Tanner, for fraud. She testified that he stole $7,250 (equivalent to $119,700 in 2025) from her between 1946 and 1947, and Tanner was eventually sent to prison. On July 19, 1950, Darnell reportedly separated from her husband. Marley offered a quiet settlement—without mention of Mankiewicz—for a payment of $125,000 (equivalent to $1.67 million in 2025). She agreed and lost almost all her money. When she filed for divorce from Marley in 1951, she accused her husband of cruelty, claiming he was "rude" and "critical" towards Darnell and her family. Following a five-minute hearing, Darnell was granted a divorce and custody of Charlotte, while Marley was to pay $75 (equivalent to $900 in 2025) a month for child support.

At thirty-two, I can see tell-tale marks in the mirror, but the ravages of time no longer terrify me. I am told that when surface beauty is gone, the real woman emerges. My only regret will be that I could not have begun it earlier—that so many years have been ruined because I was considered beautiful.

— Darnell shortly after her divorce from Liebmann.

In her later life, she dated actor Dick Paxton and had an affair with Italian director Giuseppe Amato. She married brewery heir Philip Liebmann in February 1954. Owing to her lack of interest in him physically, it was agreed that the marriage would be a business arrangement; she was to be his wife in name only and in return he would support her financially. After a while, she grew dissatisfied with this loveless marriage and detested her husband for allowing her to lash out at him and cheapening her by buying her lavish presents. In response, Darnell resorted to charity work, opening facilities accommodating 30 girls in the neighborhood of Rome in 1955. Liebmann attempted to save the marriage by adopting a baby named Alfreda, but the marriage ended nevertheless on grounds of incompatibility, and Liebmann kept the girl.

Darnell was married to pilot Merle Roy Robertson from 1957 to 1963. In 1957, she started drinking heavily again, and in November 1958, sank into a depression, but went into rehabilitation, recovering for a while. In 1963, Darnell was granted a divorce from Robertson following an outburst in the courtroom, where she accused her third husband of fathering the baby of a Polish actress. She was promised alimony of $350 monthly (equivalent to $3,600 in 2025) until July 15, 1964, and then $250 (equivalent to $2,500 in 2025) until September 15, 1967.

== Death ==
Darnell died on April 10, 1965, from burns that she had received in a house fire in Glenview, Illinois, the day before. She had been staying at the home of her former secretary and the secretary's daughter and had just received notice from her agent of three possible movie contracts. She was trapped on the second floor of the home by heat and smoke after the fire had started in the living room.

The women urged the secretary's daughter to jump from the second-floor window. After her daughter jumped, Darnell's secretary stood on the window ledge, calling for help. She had lost track of Darnell and insisted that the firefighters rescue Darnell before she was taken from the window ledge. Darnell was found next to the burning living-room sofa and was transferred to the burn unit at Chicago's Cook County Hospital with burns over 80% of her body.

After her death, a man who said that he was Darnell's fiancé identified her body. A coroner's inquest ruled that Darnell's death was accidental and that the fire had begun in or near the living-room sofa and was caused by careless smoking; both women were smokers.

Darnell's body was cremated; she had wanted her ashes scattered over a ranch in New Mexico, but because of a dispute with the landowners, that was not possible. After the remains had been in storage for 10 years, her adopted daughter asked that they be interred at the Union Hill Cemetery, Chester County, Pennsylvania, in the family plot of her son-in-law.

== Recognition ==
Darnell has a star at 1631 Vine Street in the Motion Pictures section of the Hollywood Walk of Fame.

== Filmography ==
Film
Year	Title	Role	Notes
1939	Hotel for Women	Marcia Bromley	
1939	Day-Time Wife	Jane Norton	
1940	Star Dust	Carolyn Sayres	
1940	Brigham Young	Zina Webb – The Outsider	Alternative title: Brigham Young: Frontiersman
1940	The Mark of Zorro	Lolita Quintero	
1940	Chad Hanna	Caroline Tridd Hanna	
1941	Blood and Sand	Carmen Espinosa	Photoplay Award for Best Performances of the Month - August
1941	Rise and Shine	Louise Murray	
1942	The Loves of Edgar Allan Poe	Virginia Clemm	
1943	City Without Men	Nancy Johnson	Alternative title: Prison Farm
1943	The Song of Bernadette	Virgin Mary	Uncredited
1944	It Happened Tomorrow	Sylvia Smith / Sylvia Stevens	
1944	Buffalo Bill	Dawn Starlight	
1944	Summer Storm	Olga Kuzminichna Urbenin	Photoplay Award for Best Performances of the Month - August
1944	Sweet and Low-Down	Trudy Wilson	
1945	Hangover Square	Netta Longdon	
1945	The Great John L.	Anne Livingstone	
1945	Fallen Angel	Stella	Photoplay Award for Best Performances of the Month - January
1946	Anna and the King of Siam	Tuptim	
1946	Centennial Summer	Edith Rogers	
1946	My Darling Clementine	Chihuahua	
1947	Forever Amber	Amber St. Clair	Photoplay Award for Best Performances of the Month - January
1948	The Walls of Jericho	Algeria Wedge	
1948	Unfaithfully Yours	Daphne De Carter	
1949	A Letter to Three Wives	Lora Mae Hollingsway	
1949	Slattery's Hurricane	Mrs. Aggie Hobson	
1949	Everybody Does It	Cecil Carter	Photoplay Award for Best Performances of the Month - November
1950	No Way Out	Edie Johnson	Photoplay Award for Best Performances of the Month - November
1950	Two Flags West	Elena Kenniston	
1951	The 13th Letter	Denise Turner	
1951	The Guy Who Came Back	Dee Shane	
1951	The Lady Pays Off	Evelyn Walsh Warren	
1952	Saturday Island	Lt. Elizabeth Smythe	
1952	Night Without Sleep	Julie Bannon	
1952	Blackbeard the Pirate	Edwina Mansfield	
1953	Second Chance	Clare Shepperd, alias Clare Sinclair	
1954	Angels of Darkness	Lola Baldi	Original title: Donne proibite
1954	This Is My Love	Vida Dove	
1955	It Happens in Roma	Renata Adorni	Alternative title: The Last Five Minutes
1956	Dakota Incident	Amy Clarke	
1957	Zero Hour!	Ellen Stryker	
1965	Black Spurs	Sadie	Posthumous release, (final film role)

Television
Year	Title	Role	Notes
1956	The 20th Century Fox Hour	Lily Martyn	Episode: "Deception"
1956	Screen Director's Playhouse	Ellen	Episode: "White Corridors"
1956	What's My Line	Herself (guest appearance)	March 25, 1956
1956– 1957	The Ford Television Theatre	Jennifer Hollander/Meredith Montague; Ann Dean	Episodes: "All for a Man" "Fate Travels East"
1957	Schlitz Playhouse of Stars		Episode: "Terror in the Streets"
1957	Playhouse 90	Meg Lyttleton	Episode: "Homeward Borne"
1957	Climax!	Helen Randall	Episode: "Trial by Fire"
1958	The Jane Wyman Show	Lora	Episode: "The Elevator"
1958	Studio 57		Episode: "My Little Girl"
1958	Wagon Train	Dora Gray Fogelberry	Episodes: "The Dora Gray Story" "The Sacramento Story"
1958	Pursuit		Episode: "Free Ride"
1958	Cimarron City	Mary Clinton	Episode: "Kid on a Calico Horse"
1959	77 Sunset Strip	Zina Felice	Episode: "Sing Something Simple"
1964	Burke's Law	Monica Crenshaw	Episode: "Who Killed His Royal Highness?"

== Radio appearances ==
Year	Program	Episode/source
1943	Lights Out	The Word
1945	Lux Radio Theater	The Devil & Miss Jones
1947	Bergen and McCarthy	
1952	Suspense	A Killing in Las Vegas
1953	The Bob Hope Show	Scenes from Blackbeard the Pirate
