= City Without Men =

1943 film by Sidney Salkow

- Movie poster
- Directed by: Sidney Salkow
- Written by: George Sklar (additional dialogue); Donald Davis (additional dialogue)
- Screenplay by: W. L. River
- Story by: Budd Schulberg (original story); Martin Berkeley (original story)
- Produced by: B. P. Schulberg
- Starring: Linda Darnell; Edgar Buchanan; Michael Duane
- Cinematography: Philip Tannura
- Edited by: Al Clark
- Music by: David Raksin
- Production company: B. P. Schulberg Productions
- Distributed by: Columbia Pictures
- Release date: January 14, 1943
- Running time: 75 minutes
- Country: United States
- Language: English

City Without Men (1943) by Sidney Salkow

City Without Men is a 1943 American film noir crime film directed by Sidney Salkow and starring Linda Darnell, Edgar Buchanan and Michael Duane. It was released by Columbia Pictures on January 14, 1943. A group of women lives in a boarding house near a prison where the residents are the wives of the prison inmates.

== Plot ==
The film opens with the prologue: July 1941—five months before Pearl Harbor, but already the coming events were casting their shadows before.

At sea, Tom Adams orders two Japanese men into his speedboat after seeing them climbing into a rowboat from an English ship. When Tom is approached by the Coast Guard they refuse to believe his story and charge him with aiding and abetting the Japanese. Tom is found guilty and sentenced to five years in prison. Nancy Johnson, Tom's girlfriend, is determined to exonerate him. Outside the prison, Nancy meets Michael Malloy and learns that his brother is the head of the parole board. She asks Michael to present Tom's case to his brother. Nancy gets a job at the local laundry, and rents a room in Maria Barton's boarding house, whose tenants are the wives of the prison inmates. She meets other tenants, Gwen Winnie and Billie LaRue.

On visiting day, Tom who has become embittered and disillusioned by his imprisonment refuses to see Nancy. When Tom learns about the bombing of Pearl Harbor, he asks for a chance to defend his country and petitions to be paroled into military service. Other prisoners also join Tom on the petition. However, the petition is denied by the parole board. Meanwhile, Winnie has secured a blueprint of the prison and plans to hide the convicts in bales, which would then be loaded onto a boat for delivery. The wives decide to conceal their plans from Nancy and schedule the prison break for Friday night. On Friday morning, Maria is told that her husband, who is also in prison, is at the hospital. She rushes to the hospital and learns that he was stabbed for threatening to inform the prison warden about a prison break. Her husband asks Maria to warn the warden.

Meanwhile, Nancy sees a newspaper headline which substantiates Tom's story. She goes to Michael and shows him the headline and asks him to fight for Tom's freedom. Michael barges into his brother's office and makes an impassioned speech about the injustice that was done to Tom. Michael's brother agrees to phone the warden on Tom's behalf. When the wives who are waiting at the shore for their husband hear the prison sirens, they realize that the prison escape has failed. Later, after Tom is freed from prison, he reconciles with Nancy.

== Cast ==
- Linda Darnell as Nancy Johnson
- Edgar Buchanan as Judge Michael T. Mallory
- Michael Duane as Tom Adams
- Sara Allgood as Mrs. Maria Barton
- Glenda Farrell as Billie LaRue
- Leslie Brooks as Gwen
- Doris Dudley as Winnie
- Margaret Hamilton as Dora
- Constance Worth as Elsie
- Rosemary DeCamp as Mrs. Slade
- Sheldon Leonard as Monk LaRue

== Production ==
Samuel Goldwyn Productions acquired the rights to the story by Albert Bein and Aben Kandel in 1939. Actor Jon Hall was originally set to star as the male lead and Jean Arthur was considered as his female co-star in the film. In 1942, Samuel Goldwyn Productions sold the rights to Columbia Pictures for $43,000. Columbia Pictures negotiated with actors Alan Marshal and Phillip Terry to play the male lead in the movie. Glenda Farrell replaced Claire Trevor who was initially cast to play Billie LaRue. Actresses Sara Allgood and Linda Darnell were borrowed from 20th Century Fox for the film. The waterfront scenes in the movie were filmed in San Pedro, California.

== Home media ==
Columbia Pictures released the film on DVD on August 31, 2004.
