= Two Señoritas from Chicago =

1943 film by Frank Woodruff

- Directed by: Frank Woodruff
- Written by: Stanley Rubin; Maurice Tombragel; Steven Vas; John P. Medbury
- Produced by: Wallace MacDonald
- Starring: Joan Davis; Jinx Falkenburg; Ann Savage
- Cinematography: L. William O'Connell
- Edited by: Jerome Thoms
- Music by: Morris Stoloff
- Production company: Columbia Pictures
- Distributed by: Columbia Pictures
- Release date: June 10, 1943
- Running time: 68 minutes
- Country: United States
- Language: English

Two Señoritas from Chicago is a 1943 American musical comedy film directed by Frank Woodruff and starring Joan Davis, Jinx Falkenburg and Ann Savage.

The film's sets were designed by the art director Lionel Banks.

== Cast ==
- Joan Davis as Daisy Baker
- Jinx Falkenburg as Gloria
- Ann Savage as Maria
- Leslie Brooks as Lena Worth
- Ramsay Ames as Louise Hotchkiss
- Bob Haymes as Jeff Kenyon
- Emory Parnell as Rupert Shannon
- Douglas Leavitt as Sam Grohman
- Muni Seroff as Gilberto Garcia
- Max Willenz as Armando Silva
- Stanley Brown as Mike
- Frank Sully as Bruiser
- Charles C. Wilson as Chester T. Allgood
- Romaine Callender as Miffins

== Bibliography ==
- Michael L. Stephens. Art Directors in Cinema: A Worldwide Biographical Dictionary. McFarland, 1998.
