= Second Chance (1953 film) =

1953 American film directed by Rudolph Maté

- Theatrical release poster
- Directed by: Rudolph Maté
- Screenplay by: Sydney Boehm; Oscar Millard
- Story by: D. M. Marshman, Jr.
- Produced by: Sam Wiesenthal
- Starring: Robert Mitchum; Jack Palance; Linda Darnell
- Cinematography: William E. Snyder
- Edited by: Robert Ford; Albrecht Joseph
- Music by: Roy Webb
- Production company: RKO Radio Pictures
- Distributed by: RKO Radio Pictures
- Release date: July 18, 1953 (US)
- Running time: 82 minutes
- Country: United States
- Language: English
- Box office: $2 million (US)

Second Chance is a 1953 Technicolor crime film directed by Rudolph Maté. The picture, shot on location in Mexico in 3D, features Robert Mitchum, Linda Darnell, and Jack Palance. It is notable as the first RKO film produced in 3D.

== Plot ==
A mob bookkeeper is killed by hitman Cappy Gordon, under orders from gangster Vic Spilato, who is currently under investigation by the U.S. Senate. Cappy then heads for the Latin American town of San Cristóbal, with plans to murder singer Clare Shepperd, Spilato's estranged girlfriend.

Meanwhile, American prizefighter Russ Lambert also heads to San Cristóbal to take his mind off his accidental killing of an opponent in the ring. Clare, under the alias "Clare Sinclair," seeks out Felipe, a bar-owner who was once criminally connected with Spilato, and sells him a valuable pair of earrings. Clare finds herself attracted to Lambert after watching him defeat local challenger Rivera, whom she has mistakenly bet on. Cappy eventually finds Clare and expresses his love for her, promising to spare her life if she runs off with him. Instead, Clare flees for Felipe's bar and threatens to expose the owner to Cappy, unless Felipe will persuade Lambert to meet her at the isolated Posado de Don Pascual. Felipe does so, and Clare and Lambert meet there, beginning a relationship with romantic possibilities, though Clare does not tell Lambert about her stormy past.

Clare and Lambert take an aerial tramway to La Cumbre ("The Summit"), a secluded mountaintop village, and enjoy a stroll through the town, unaware that Cappy is pursuing them. They watch a sexually provocative dance performed by a young man and woman, whose husband, Vasco, drags her off in a jealous rage, kills her, and is arrested. Upset by the event, Clare and Lambert decide to stay at a hotel, since the aerial lift has ended service for the night and there is no other way in or out of La Cumbre. The two kiss, and Lambert reveals he knows of her history with Spilato.

When Clare is alone at the hotel, Cappy barges into her room and makes her promise to meet him later on the cable car, where, he claims, they will reunite and flee together, otherwise he will kill Lambert. To save Lambert, Clare gives him the slip and goes to the cable car. However, Lambert, finding her room empty, follows and catches the car, which is also being used by local police to transport Vasco to San Cristóbal. En route, Clare claims she has simply changed her mind and wants to finish with Lambert, but he does not believe her.

At an intermediate stopping point, Cappy again threatens Clare, who seems to be about to throw herself down the mountain, but faints. She is carried back on board by Lambert, and they all continue the cable car journey.

High above an abyss, one of two main cables snaps, jolting the car to a halt and sending its engineer plummeting to his death. Clare, Lambert, Cappy, Vasco, and other passengers are left stranded in midair, and the remaining cable begins to fray, threatening to send them all to their doom. There is a possibility that one of the passengers could swing from the rope to a nearby cliff, and then run back into La Cumbre to send for two emergency lifts. These lifts, which are smaller than the cable car, can be guided alongside the car, but they can only carry so much weight; in fact, three passengers will have to be left behind and will die when the second cable breaks.

Vasco volunteers, and the officer escorting him allows him to do so because the former's young son is in the cable car. Vasco, however, swings into the cliff too hard, causing him to smash into the rocks and perish. Lambert volunteers for the task next and succeeds. He returns with the first of the lifts, but, before Clare and others can board it, Cappy grabs a police handgun and wounds the officer. He then attempts to board the lift, taking only himself and Clare, but Lambert attacks him. Cappy and Lambert then fight until one of Lambert's punches sends Cappy tumbling over the railing to his death. The remaining passengers board the lifts and get away seconds before the cable parts, dropping the car into the abyss.

== Cast ==
- Robert Mitchum as Russ Lambert
- Linda Darnell as Clare Shepperd, alias Clare Sinclair
- Jack Palance as Cappy Gordon, alias Mr. Walters
- Roy Roberts as Charley Malloy
- Dan Seymour as Felipe, manager of a bar
- Fortunio Bonanova as Mandy, hotel owner
- Sandro Giglio as Cable Car Conductor
- Reginald Sheffield as Mr. Woburn, English tourist
- Margaret Brewster as Mrs. Woburn, English tourist
- Rodolfo Hoyos Jr. as Vasco, murderous husband
- Richard Vera as Pablo, Vasco's son
- Maurice Jara as Fernando, groom
- Judy Walsh as Maria, bride
- Salvador Baguez as Officer Hernandez
- Milburn Stone as Edward Dawson, Vic Spilato's bookkeeper
- Abel Fernández as Rivera, a boxer from San Cristóbal

== Background ==
Second Chance was RKO Radio's first foray into the world of 3-D film, a prevalent cinema fad in the 1950s, and it featured their top stars. Bad guy Jack Palance was fresh from his critically well-regarded work on Shane (1953). The picture was also the first Hollywood 3-D feature shot in a foreign location.

Critic Jeff Stafford believes the 3-D format was often unjustly maligned and in the early 1950s, was on the verge of "moving beyond the exploitable 'in your face' aspects" into more creative uses of the technology when the fad died. He makes the case that the final scenes of Second Chance were "much more intense in 3-D when the depth of field and spatial relationships create[d] a genuine sense of vertigo."

According to critic Bosley Crowther, the screenplay was inspired by an aerial tramway accident that occurred in Rio de Janeiro circa 1951. Crowther wrote, "Except for one man being killed in an attempt to go for help via a rope and the slugging melee on the platform, this could almost be the Rio episode."

=== Filming locations ===
The film was shot entirely in Mexico, including: Cuernavaca, Morelos and Taxco, Guerrero.

== Reception ==
=== Critical response ===
Bosley Crowther, film critic for The New York Times, was not impressed with the film's story but was captured by the thrilling ending, writing, "The build-up to the aerial adventure is not only synthetic but slow...the development of a romance between Mr. Mitchum and Linda Darnell...is mechanical and routine. But once they get aboard that tramway—Mr. Mitchum and Miss Darnell, coming down off the mountain and trailed by Mr. Palance—the drama begins to crackle. And once that cable snaps, the picture becomes a welter of cliff-hanging terror and suspense. Every little movement of the tramway, hanging up there by a thread, causes the acrophobe to tremble. And there is plenty of movement, indeed."

A reviewer for Time magazine, while calling 3-D "a novel gimmick," lauded the performance of Jack Palance, writing, "This man Palance keeps the show as well as Linda on the move. A rivet-eyed, onetime prelim fighter from the Pennsylvania coal country, Palance (né Palahniuk) [sic] gave terrifying performances in Shane (1953) and Sudden Fear, (1952) has since become the hottest heavy in Hollywood. His face alone, as thin and cruel as a rust-pitted spade, is enough to-frighten a strong man; and to make matters worse, he seems to emit hostile energy, like something left overnight in a plutonium pile."

== See also ==
- List of 3D films
