= Two Latins from Manhattan =

1941 US film directed by Charles Barton

- Theatrical poster
- Directed by: Charles Barton
- Written by: Albert Duffy
- Produced by: Wallace MacDonald
- Starring: Joan Davis; Jinx Falkenburg; Joan Woodbury
- Cinematography: John Stumar
- Edited by: Arthur Seid
- Music by: Morris Stoloff
- Production company: Columbia Pictures
- Distributed by: Columbia Pictures
- Release date: October 2, 1941
- Running time: 77 minutes
- Country: United States
- Language: English

Two Latins from Manhattan is a 1941 American comedy film directed by Charles Barton and starring Joan Davis, Jinx Falkenburg and Joan Woodbury. It was produced and distributed by Columbia Pictures.

== Plot ==
A booking agent from New York City urgently needs to recruit a new act when the Cuban sisters she engages to play at a nightclub fail to show up. She recruits Jinx and Lois, two local girls, to pretend to be the Latin American performers. Trouble ensues when the real Cuban sisters then finally appear.

== Cast ==
- Joan Davis as Joan Daley
- Jinx Falkenburg as Jinx Terry
- Joan Woodbury as Lois Morgan
- Fortunio Bonanova as Armando Rivero
- Don Beddoe as Don Barlow
- Marquita Madero as Marianela
- Carmen Morales as Rosita
- Lloyd Bridges as Tommy Curtis
- Sig Arno as Felipe Rudolfo MacIntyre
- John Dilson a sJerome Kittleman
- Boyd Davis as Charles Miller
- Tim Ryan as Police Sergeant
- Don Brodie as Advertising Man
- Lester Dorr as Information Attendant
- Bruce Bennett as Federal Agent
- Ralph Dunn as Federal Agent
- Stanley Brown as Master of Ceremonies
- Antonio Moreno as Cuban
- Rafael Alcayde as Cuban
- Dick Elliott as Sylvester Kittelman
- Jack Cheatham as Police Officer
- Eddie Kane as Stage Manager
- Ernie Adams as Stage Doorman
- Tyler Brooke as Hotel Clerk

== Bibliography ==
- Fetrow, Alan G. Feature Films, 1940-1949: a United States Filmography. McFarland, 1994.
- Tucker, David C. Joan Davis: America's Queen of Film, Radio and Television Comedy. McFarland, 2014.
