= Chad Hanna =

1940 film by Henry King

- Film poster
- Directed by: Henry King
- Screenplay by: Nunnally Johnson
- Based on: Red Wheels Rolling (1940) by Walter D. Edmonds
- Produced by: Darryl F. Zanuck
- Starring: Henry Fonda; Dorothy Lamour; Linda Darnell
- Cinematography: Ernest Palmer; Ray Rennahan
- Edited by: Barbara McLean
- Music by: David Buttolph
- Color process: Technicolor
- Production company: 20th Century Fox
- Distributed by: 20th Century Fox
- Release date: December 25, 1940
- Running time: 89 minutes
- Country: United States
- Language: English

Chad Hanna is a 1940 American drama romance film directed by Henry King, and was adapted from a bestseller of sorts that was published that same year. The novel was written by Walter Dumaux Edmonds (after it had first been published in serial form in the Saturday Evening Post under the title "Red Wheels Rolling"). It stars Henry Fonda, Linda Darnell and Dorothy Lamour.

== Plot ==
In the 1840s, Chad Hanna, a New York country boy taking care of workhorses plying the Erie Canal in Canastota, New York, is compelled to join a smalltime travelling circus because of a black slave he's aiding in escaping. He falls in love with its star performer, beautiful bareback rider Albany Yates, but she spurns him. Chad then finds himself attracted to another runaway from his home village, country girl Caroline Tridd.

Although everybody assumes that the boy is slow on the uptake, Chad manages to save the circus from financial ruin. By the end, marred to Caroline and having become a new dad, he's also its new ringmaster.

== Cast ==
- Henry Fonda as Chad Hanna
- Dorothy Lamour as Albany Yates
- Linda Darnell as Caroline
- Guy Kibbee as Huguenine
- Jane Darwell as Mrs. Huguenine
- John Carradine as B.D. Bisbee
- Ted North as Fred Shepley
- Roscoe Ates as Ike Wayfish
- Ben Carter as Bell Boy
- Frank M. Thomas as Burke (as Frank Thomas)
- Olin Howland as Cisco Tridd
- Frank Conlan as Mr. Proudfoot
- Eddie Conrad as Fiero (as Edward Conrad)
- Edward McWade as Elias
- Edward Mundy as Joe Duddy
- George Davis as Pete Bostock
- Paul E. Burns as Budlong (as Paul Burns)
- Sarah Padden as Mrs. Tridd
- Leonard St. Leo as Mr. Pamplon (as Leonard St. Leo)
- Elizabeth Abbott as Mrs. Pamplon
- Tully Marshall as Mr. Mott
- Almira Sessions as Mrs. Mott
- Virginia Brissac as Landlady
- Si Jenks as Farmer
- Victor Kilian as Potato Man
- Louis Mason as Constable
- Charles Middleton as Sheriff
