= Jinx Falkenburg =

American radio host, actress and model (1919–2003)

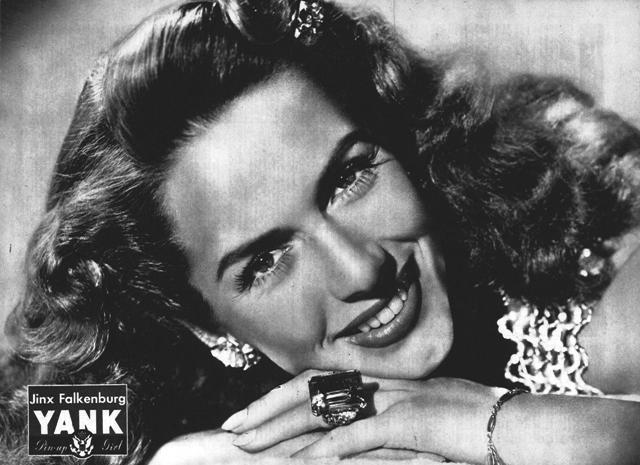
- Falkenburg in Yank, the Army Weekly (1945)
- Born: Eugenia Lincoln Falkenburg; January 21, 1919; Barcelona, Catalonia, Spain
- Died: August 27, 2003 (aged 84); Manhasset, New York, U.S.
- Resting place: Ashes scattered at her farm residence in Duchess County, New York
- Occupations: Actress; model
- Years active: 1937–1975
- Political party: Republican
- Spouse: Tex McCrary (m. 1945; sep. 1980)
- Children: 2

Eugenia Lincoln "Jinx" Falkenburg (January 21, 1919 – August 27, 2003) was an American actress and model. She married journalist and publicist Tex McCrary in 1945. Known as "Tex and Jinx", the couple pioneered and popularized the talk show format, first on radio and then in the early days of television. They hosted a series of interview shows in the late 1940s and early 1950s that combined celebrity chit-chat with discussions of important topics of the day.

== Early life ==
Falkenburg was born to American parents in Barcelona, Spain; her father Eugene "Genie" Lincoln Falkenburg was an engineer for Westinghouse. Thinking the name would bring good luck, she was nicknamed Jinx by her mother Marguerite "Mickey" Crooks Falkenburg, an athlete and tennis player (Brazil women's champion in 1927), and the name stuck. All the Falkenburg offspring became known for their tennis abilities; younger brother Bob won the men's singles championship at Wimbledon in 1948.

The family moved to Santiago, Chile, where she spent her early years. She first received media attention at age 2 when The New York Sun ran a full-page picture and story of her exploits as a "baby swimmer." A revolution in Chile caused the family to return to the United States and they moved to Los Angeles, California. She attended Hollywood High School but left in 1935 at the age of 16 to pursue a career in acting and modeling.

== Career ==
=== Acting and modeling ===
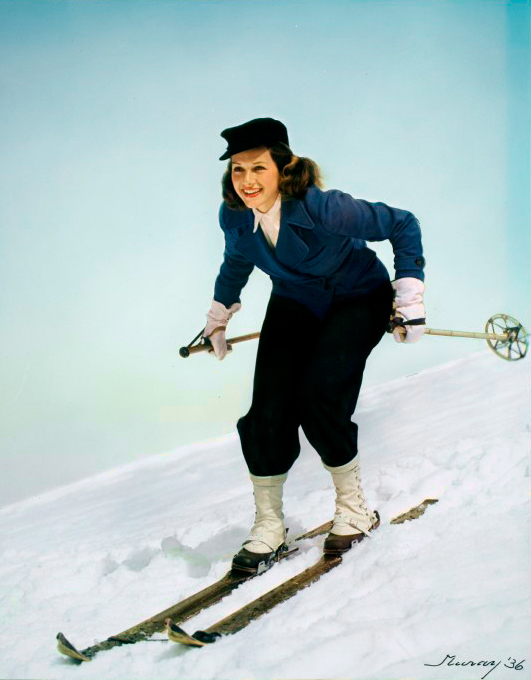
Falkenburg on McCall's cover in 1938

The Falkenburgs were at the center of a young social set at the West Side Tennis Club in Hollywood. While playing tennis there she was noticed by a talent scout for Warner Bros. and signed to a studio contract. After a few brief walk-ons, her fluency in Spanish won her minor roles in a series of Spanish-language films made for distribution in Latin America.

In 1937 her modeling career began when she met celebrity fashion photographer Paul Hesse, whose Sunset Strip studio was a gathering place for advertising moguls and motion picture industry celebrities. Calling her "the most charming, most vital personality I have ever had the pleasure to photograph", he took her picture for the August 1937 cover of The American Magazine, triggering similar offers from 60 other publications. Falkenburg appeared on over 200 magazine covers and in some 1,500 commercial advertisements in the 1930s and 1940s. She was considered to be one of the most beautiful women of that era, known for her All-American-Girl athletic good looks. The New Yorker magazine said she "possessed one of the most photogenic faces and frames in the Western world". The New York World-Telegram said her face was seen more often and in more places than any other woman in the country. And a headline story in the January 27, 1941, issue of Life magazine said Falkenburg "is the leading candidate for America's No. 1 Girl for 1941".

In 1939 she was in Hawaii posing for photographer Edward Steichen for a series of ads for the Hawaiian Steamship Company's Matson Line when she fell through a balcony at the Royal Hawaiian Hotel and landed 30 feet below on a dining room table. While in the hospital recovering from her injuries, she was introduced to singer Al Jolson, who was also convalescing there. Jolson offered her a role in his upcoming Broadway show Hold On to Your Hats, which opened in January 1940. Though her part as a cowgirl was small, she attracted much attention. Fans started gathering nightly at her dressing room door at the Shubert Theater, forming the core of what would become the Jinx Falkenburg Fan Club, the only national fan club not devoted to a movie star.

Her biggest breakthrough as a model came in 1940 when she was picked by New York-based Liebmann Brewery, maker of Rheingold Beer, to be the first Miss Rheingold. As the face for its marketing and advertising campaign, her image appeared on billboards throughout New York, Pennsylvania, and New England., and she was featured in promotional ads at every store that sold Rheingold. Her face and the campaign were a great success. Rheingold was suddenly the top brand in New York City.

In the early 1940s she did a dozen movies, mainly for Columbia Pictures, sometimes in the starring role. Mostly B movies, neither they nor her acting garnered much critical acclaim. Among them were Two Latins from Manhattan, Sweetheart of the Fleet, Laugh Your Blues Away, She Has What It Takes, Two Senoritas From Chicago, and Nine Girls. The biggest hit was Cover Girl, a musical about the modeling business that starred Rita Hayworth, with songs by Jerome Kern and Ira Gershwin. Falkenburg played herself in a cameo role.

=== Tex and Jinx: Radio and television ===
Falkenburg met John Reagan "Tex" McCrary when he came to photograph and interview her for a military publication after she opened in Hold On to Your Hats. He was a lieutenant colonel in the Army Air Forces. They were about to be engaged in 1942, but World War II intervened. They married after the war, on June 15, 1945, in a civil ceremony conducted by New York Supreme Court Judge Ferdinand Pecora, famous for investigating the 1929 stock market crash and its aftermath.

As World War II escalated in 1942, Falkenburg was invited to contribute to the inaugural broadcasts of CBS's innovative international radio network La Cadena de las Américas (Network of the Americas) under the supervision of the Office of the Coordinator of Inter-American Affairs chaired by Nelson Rockefeller. This opportunity enabled Falkenburg to make a notable contribution to the implementation of President Franklin Roosevelt's cultural diplomacy initiatives in South America even as hostilities raged throughout Europe.

During the war, Falkenburg traveled extensively on USO tours entertaining troops. The most arduous was a 42,000-mile (68,000 km) 80-stop series of shows in the rugged China-Burma-India theatre of operations. In 1945 she was awarded the Asiatic-Pacific Campaign Medal for her contributions.

Backed by some of his well-connected friends like millionaire financier Bernard Baruch, McCrary convinced David Sarnoff, the chairman of RCA, which owned NBC, to give the couple a morning show on the network's New York radio station, WEAF. The show was called Hi, Jinx and first aired on April 22, 1946. Reviews ranged from "sprightly" to "rather intense discussions of foreign affairs". In a cover story about the couple, Newsweek wrote: "A soft-spoken, calculating Texan, Tex McCrary, inched up to the microphone and drawled 'Hi, Jinx.' A voice with all the foam substance of a bubble bath answered, 'Hello Tex.'" Over time they came to be known as "Mr. Brains and Mrs. Beauty".

The McCrarys' radio show was broadcast five mornings a week on New York radio station WEAF and became a hit with critics and the public for tackling controversial issues like the atomic bomb, the United Nations and venereal disease, along with talk about theatre openings and New York nightlife. Their guests were a mix of popular entertainers such as Mary Martin, Ethel Waters and Esther Williams and public figures such as Eleanor Roosevelt, Margaret Truman, Bernard Baruch, industrialist Igor Sikorsky and Indian statesman Krishna Menon.

McCrary wrote the scripts and taught Falkenburg the art of interviewing and the basics of broadcast journalism. Over time she was considered the better interviewer, eliciting candid responses, often from the show's more intellectual guests. Her technique was to ask questions until she understood the answer and so, presumably, did all the housewives at home listening to her. "They developed an audience that was ready to start thinking at breakfast", wrote New York Times columnist William Safire, who as a teenager was hired by McCrary to do pre-show interviews of guests.

In January 1947, McCrary and Falkenburg had their first network TV show, Bristol-Myers Tele-Varieties, also known as Jinx and Tex at Home, broadcast Sunday nights on NBC. The program combined film and live interviews of celebrities in their residences. In May 1947, The Swift Home Service Club combined household tips with breezy interviews. Another radio show, Meet Tex and Jinx got such a big audience that in 1947 and 1948 it became a summer replacement for one of radio's most popular shows, Duffy's Tavern.

In the winter of 1948, Falkenburg traveled to Berlin, Germany, during the height of the Berlin Airlift, when the city was under blockade by the Russians and emergency supplies were being flown in by Allied planes. She flew in with comedian Bob Hope and songwriter Irving Berlin to do highly publicized Christmas shows for airmen and occupation soldiers.

McCrary and Falkenburg's popularity grew, and at one point in the early 1950s they hosted two radio programs and a daily television show and wrote a column for the New York Herald Tribune. Some of their shows were broadcast from the Peacock Alley restaurant in the Waldorf-Astoria Hotel.

Armed with tape recorder and microphone, Falkenburg often did interviews outside the studio. She covered many major stories of the day, including the coronation of Queen Elizabeth II in London and the wedding of Grace Kelly to Prince Rainier of Monaco. In 1958, she was the only female reporter on the press plane that accompanied then Vice President Richard Nixon on his trip to South America, where he encountered rock-throwing crowds in Venezuela. She also was on assignment and appeared on camera in the historic finger-poking televised "kitchen debate" in Moscow between Nixon and Soviet leader Nikita Khrushchev. Safire maneuvered the two leaders into the kitchen of the model home, whose manufacturer was a client of McCrary's, for the confrontation.

== Politics ==
In 1952, McCrary spearheaded a campaign to get General Dwight D. Eisenhower to run for president on the Republican ticket. A high point of that recruitment effort was a "Citizens for Eisenhower" rally at Madison Square Garden. Falkenburg and McCrary organized and hosted the three-hour event.

At the behest of John Hay Whitney, finance chairman for the Republican Party, Falkenburg became head of the women's division of the finance committee in 1954. (McCrary was a wartime friend and neighbor of Whitney—he and Falkenburg lived in a house on Whitney's Greentree Estate in Manhasset, Long Island). She continued to serve on the finance committee and remained a lifelong Republican, occasionally lending her name to the party's causes.

== Later years ==
Falkenburg informally retired from broadcasting in 1958 and continued to live in Manhasset. In 1962, she and McCrary anchored 16 weeks of coverage of the Billy Graham Crusade for Christianity. In the early 1960s, Falkenburg was a commercial spokesperson for the American Gas Association. She became vice-president of Marian Bialac Cosmetics, a company owned by Whitney.

== Personal life ==
Falkenburg and McCrary had two sons, John Reagan "Paddy" McCrary III and Kevin Jock McCrary. In 2011, Kevin appeared on the A&E reality TV show Hoarders (Season 4, Episode 12, "Kevin & Mary"), in which he was threatened with eviction for hoarding his New York City apartment floor-to-ceiling. After failing to clean out his apartment with help from the show's team, Kevin was granted an extension following the events of the episode, but was officially evicted by the U.S. Marshals in March 2014 after losing a two-year legal battle with his landlord over his hoard.

Falkenburg's athletic prowess remained on display as she moved from starlet to middle age. She took up golf at the age of 40 and within a short time had a 12 handicap. In 1975, at the age of 56, she was part of a celebrity team that played a pre-opening tennis match at Forest Hills before the start of the U.S. Open.

In 1980, McCrary and Falkenburg separated but never divorced and remained friends. McCrary died at 92 on July 29, 2003, less than one month before Falkenburg.

She also was involved in charitable work and was on the board of the North Shore Hospital in Manhasset, which her husband was instrumental in getting built.

Falkenburg died on August 27, 2003, at the age of 84 at North Shore Hospital in Manhasset. Her body was cremated.

== Legacy ==
For her contribution to the television industry, Falkenburg has a star on the Hollywood Walk of Fame at 1500 Vine Street.

== Fictional depiction ==
Falkenburg is featured as a supporting character in books #1-3, set in World War II Burma, of a French graphic-novel series, Angel Wings.

== Selected filmography ==
- She Has What It Takes (1943)
- Two Señoritas from Chicago (1943)
- Cover Girl (1944)
- Nine Girls (1944)
