= Leslie Brooks =

American actress (1922–2011)

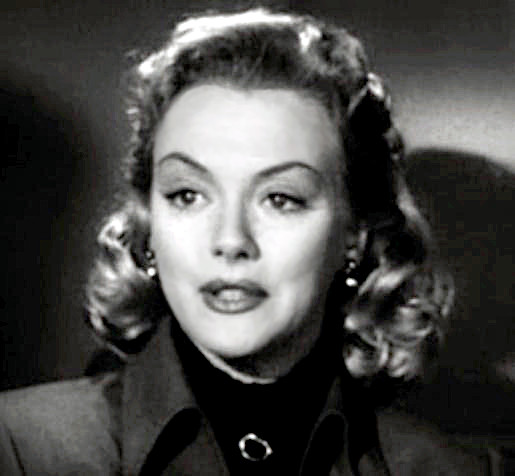
- Brooks in Blonde Ice (1948)
- Born: Virginia Leslie Gettman; July 13, 1922; Lincoln, Nebraska, U.S.
- Died: July 1, 2011 (aged 88); Sherman Oaks, California, U.S.
- Resting place: Forest Lawn Memorial Park, Hollywood Hills, California
- Other names: Lorraine Gettman
- Occupations: Actress; model; dancer
- Years active: 1941–1948; 1971
- Known for: Blonde Ice
- Spouses: Donald Anthony Shay (m. 1945; div. 1948) Russ Vincent (m. 1950)
- Children: 4
- Parent(s): Violet Fern Clark, Paul M. Gettman

Leslie Brooks (born Virginia Leslie Gettman; July 13, 1922 – July 1, 2011) was an American film actress, model and dancer.

== Early life ==
Born in Lincoln, Nebraska, her parents brought her to Southern California at an early age, where around 1940 she started work as a photographic model. At the beginning of her career in show business she appeared as Lorraine Gettman.

== Career ==
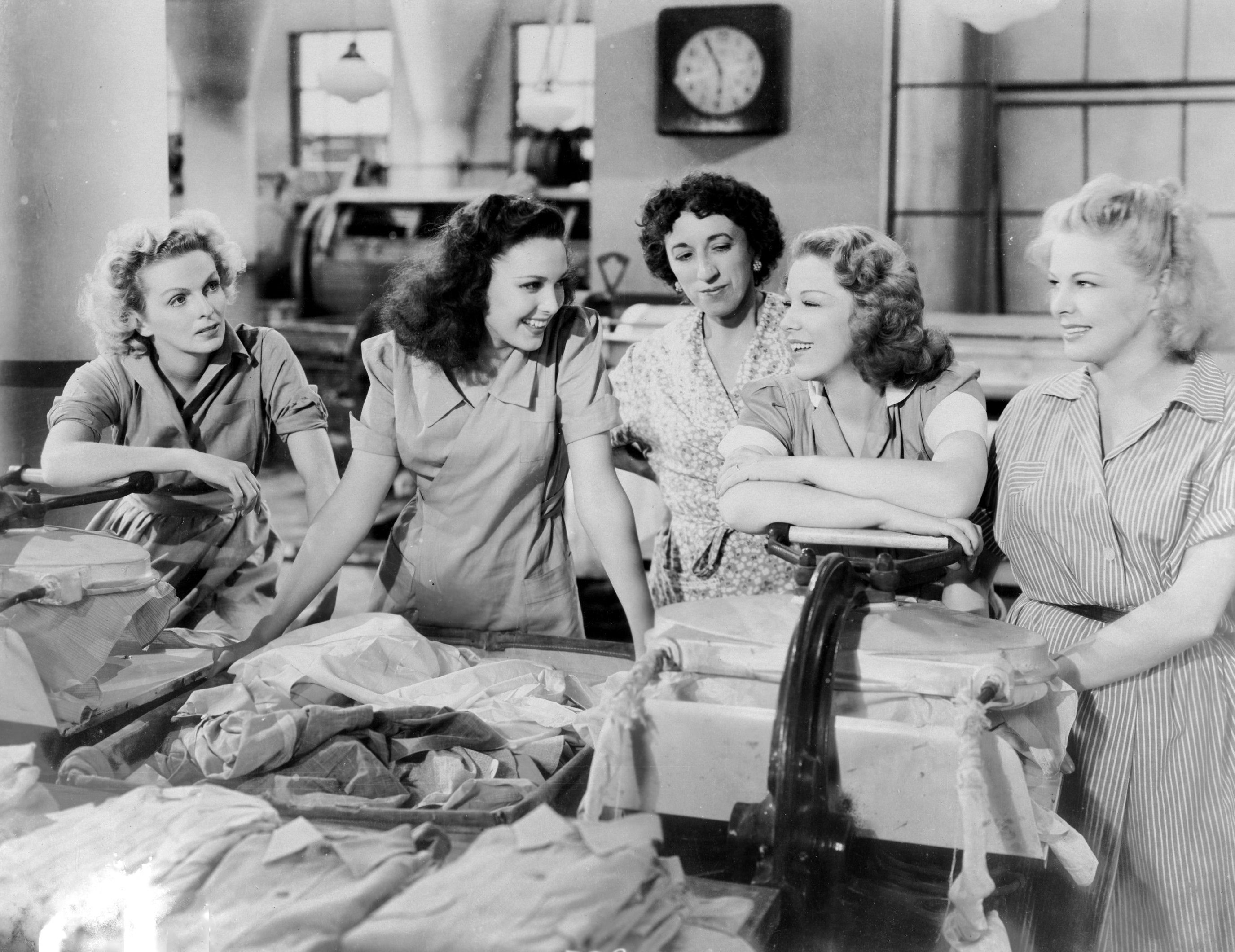
(L-R): Doris Dudley, Linda Darnell, Margaret Hamilton, Glenda Farrell and Leslie Brooks in City Without Men (1943)

As Leslie Brooks, she began appearing in movie bit roles for Columbia in 1941. Brooks started landing more sizable parts in such movies as Nine Girls (1944), Cover Girl (1944), and the lead in the film noir classic Blonde Ice (1948). She retired from films in 1949, but returned to make one last film in 1971.

== Personal life ==
Brooks was born in Lincoln, Nebraska on July 13, 1922, the daughter of Paul and Fern Clark Gettman. She spent much of her childhood with her paternal grandparents who ran a hotel in Crofton, and attended high school in Omaha. Brooks was married twice and had four daughters. She wed her first husband, actor Donald Anthony Shay, on January 6, 1945, in Beverly Hills, California. They had a daughter, Leslie Victoria (b. 1945), and divorced in 1948. In 1950, she married Russ Vincent, an actor and, later, a successful Hollywood land developer. She had appeared with him in the 1948 film Blonde Ice. They remained married until his death 51 years later. Brooks and Vincent had three daughters together; Dorena Marla (b. 1954), Gina L. (b. 1956) and Darla R. (b. 1960).

== Death ==
Brooks died on July 1, 2011, at the age of 88 in Sherman Oaks, California and was buried at the Forest Lawn, Hollywood Hills Cemetery in Los Angeles.

== Selected filmography ==
- Yankee Doodle Dandy (1942) as Chorus Girl in "Little Johnny Jones" (uncredited)
- You Were Never Lovelier (1942) as Cecy Acuña
- Lucky Legs (1942) as Jewel Perkins
- Overland to Deadwood (1942) as Linda Banning
- Underground Agent (1942) as Ann Carter
- Two Señoritas from Chicago (1943) as Lena Worth
- City Without Men (1943) as Gwen
- What's Buzzin', Cousin? (1943) as Josie (1943)
- Nine Girls (1944) as Roberta Holloway
- Cover Girl (1944) as Maurine Martin
- Tonight and Every Night (1945) as Angela
- I Love a Bandleader (1945) as Ann Stuart
- The Secret of the Whistler (1946) as Kay Morrell
- The Man Who Dared (1946) as Lorna Claibourne
- Cigarette Girl (1947) as Ellen Wilcox
- Romance on the High Seas (1948) as Miss Medwick
- Blonde Ice (1948) as Claire Cummings Hanneman
- Hollow Triumph (1948) as Virginia Taylor
- The Cobra Strikes (1948) as Olga Kaminoff
- How's Your Love Life? (1971) as Dr. Maureen John
