= Overland to Deadwood =

1942 film by William Berke

- Directed by: William Berke
- Screenplay by: Paul Franklin
- Produced by: Jack Fier
- Starring: Charles Starrett; Russell Hayden; Cliff Edwards; Leslie Brooks; Norman Willis; Matt Willis
- Cinematography: Benjamin H. Kline
- Edited by: Mel Thorsen
- Production company: Columbia Pictures
- Distributed by: Columbia Pictures
- Release date: September 25, 1942
- Running time: 59 minutes
- Country: United States
- Language: English

Overland to Deadwood is a 1942 American Western film directed by William Berke and written by Paul Franklin. The film stars Charles Starrett, Russell Hayden, Cliff Edwards, Leslie Brooks, Norman Willis and Matt Willis. The film was released on September 25, 1942, by Columbia Pictures.

== Cast ==
- Charles Starrett as Steve Prescott
- Russell Hayden as Lucky Chandler
- Cliff Edwards as Harmony Hobbs
- Leslie Brooks as Linda Banning
- Norman Willis as Cash Quinlan
- Matt Willis as Red Larson
- Francis Walker as Vance
- Lynton Brent as Clipper
- June Pickerell as Mrs. Banning
- Gordon De Main as George Bullock
