= Nine Girls =

1944 film by Leigh Jason

- Theatrical release poster
- Directed by: Leigh Jason
- Screenplay by: Karen DeWolf; Connie Lee; Al Martin (adaptation)
- Based on: Nine Girls by Wilfred H. Petitt
- Produced by: Burt Kelly
- Starring: Ann Harding; Evelyn Keyes; Jinx Falkenburg; Anita Louise; Leslie Brooks; Lynn Merrick; Jeff Donnell; Nina Foch; Shirley Mills; Marcia Mae Jones
- Cinematography: James Van Trees
- Edited by: Otto Meyer
- Music by: John Leipold
- Production company: Columbia Pictures
- Distributed by: Columbia Pictures
- Release date: February 17, 1944 (United States)
- Running time: 78 minutes
- Country: United States
- Language: English

Nine Girls is a 1944 American mystery film directed by Leigh Jason from a screenplay by Karen DeWolf and Connie Lee, based on the 1943 play of the same name by Wilfred H. Petitt. The film stars Ann Harding, Evelyn Keyes, Jinx Falkenburg, Anita Louise, Leslie Brooks, Lynn Merrick, Jeff Donnell, Nina Foch, Shirley Mills, and Marcia Mae Jones.

== Plot ==
Police arrive at a cabin in the woods to investigate the murder of a snooty sorority sister on initiation night. It is raining too hard for anyone to leave, and panic sets in as the sorority sisters and their house mother begin to point fingers at one another.

== Cast ==
- Ann Harding as Gracie Thornton
- Evelyn Keyes as Mary O'Ryan
- Jinx Falkenburg as Jane Peters
- Anita Louise as Paula Canfield
- Leslie Brooks as Roberta Halloway
- Lynn Merrick as Eve Sharon
- Jeff Donnell as "Butch" Hendricks
- Nina Foch as Alice Blake
- Shirley Mills as "Tennessee" Collingwood
- Marcia Mae Jones as Shirley Berke
- Willard Robertson as Capt. Brooks
- William Demarest as Walter Cummings
- Lester Matthews as Horace Canfield
- Grady Sutton as photographer
