= Doris Dudley =

American actress

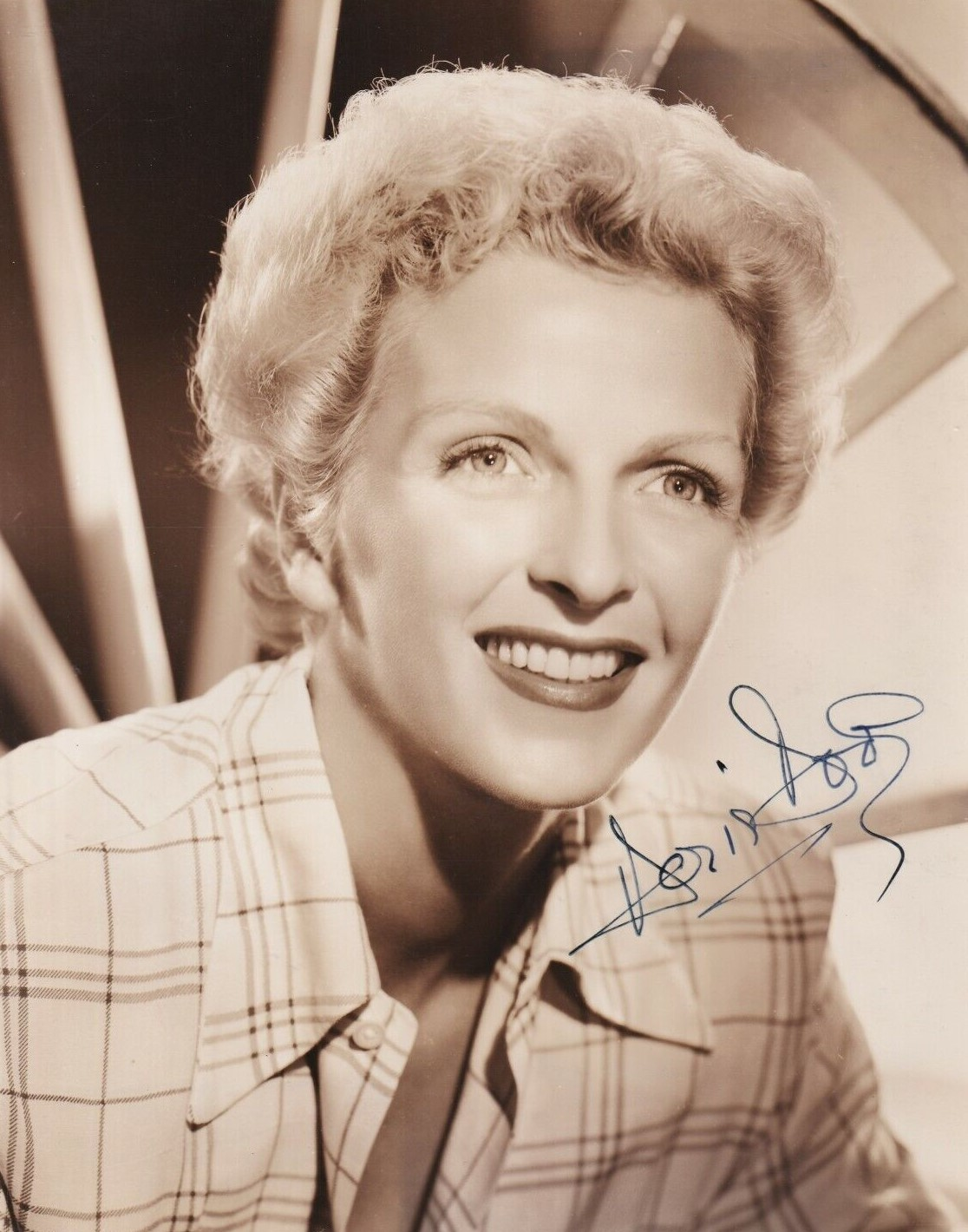
- Dudley in the 1940s
- Born: September 17, 1917; New York City, U.S.
- Died: August 14, 1985 (aged 68)
- Occupation(s): Actress, real-estate developer
- Spouse: Jack. E. Jenkins (m. 1936)
- Children: 2, including Butch Jenkins
- Father: Bide Dudley

Doris Dudley (July 17, 1917 - August 14, 1985) was an American actress who later became a real-estate developer.

== Early years ==
Dudley was born in New York. She was the daughter of playwright and drama critic Bide Dudley. Her brother, Bronson, was a dancer.

== Career ==
Dudley's professional acting debut resulted from her visiting producer Eddie Dowling in his office and reading some lines for him. She left his office as the leading lady in Agatha Calling, which made a pre-Broadway tour but never reached Broadway. Dudley's Broadway credits included The Season Changes (1936), End of Summer, Stick-in-the-Mud, Here Come the Clowns (1939), and My Dear Children (1940).

In 1939, Dudley portrayed Cordelia in the New York opening of My Dear Children, starring John Barrymore. She had stepped into that role of Barrymore's character's daughter in St. Louis when his wife, Elaine, left the show following a marital dispute. Two weeks after the New York opening, Elaine replaced Dudley as Cordelia. "Mrs. Barrymore wanted my role," Dudley said later about being fired for the first time. Later that month, Dudley had the female lead in Margin for Error at the Plymouth Theatre in Boston.

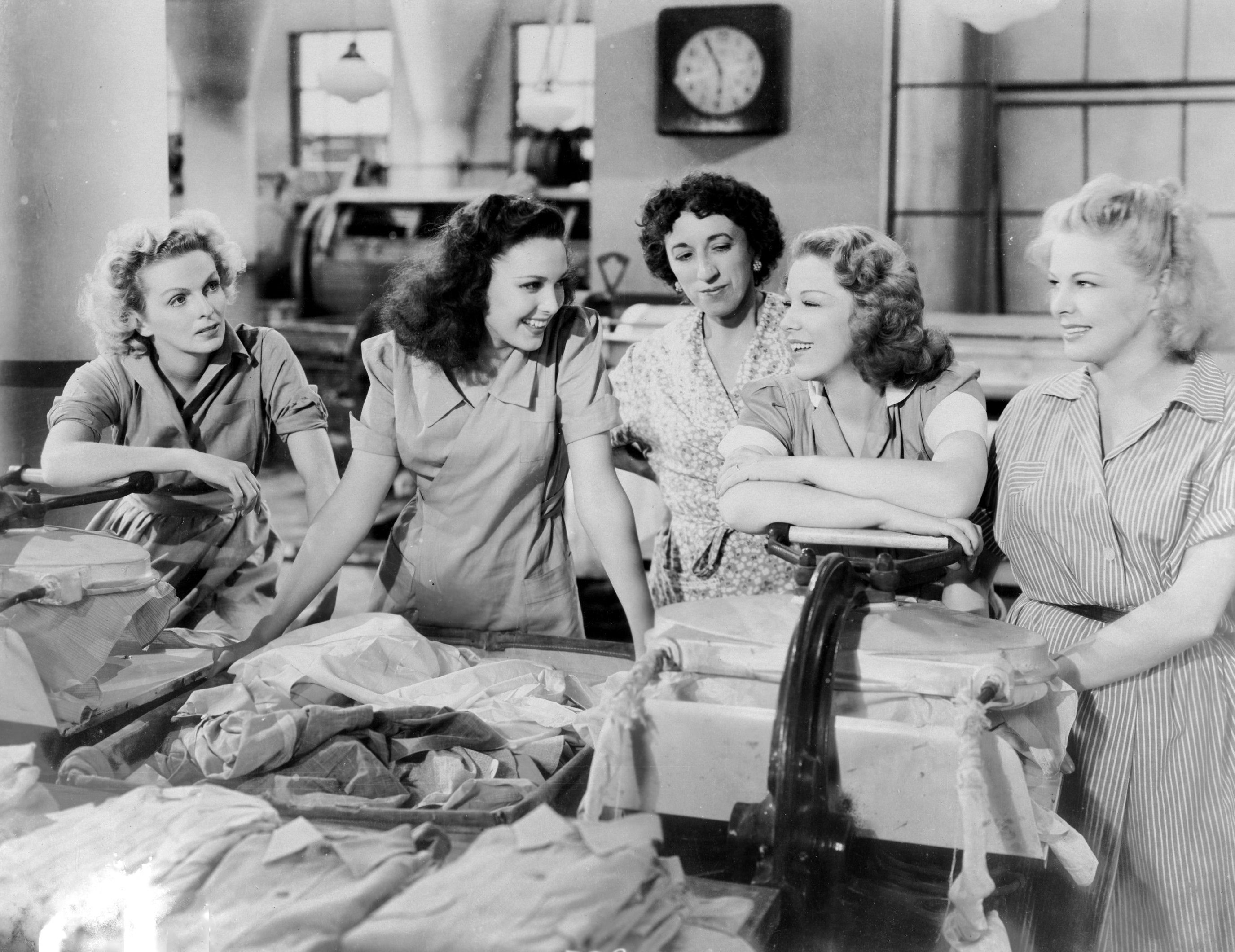
(L-R): Doris Dudley, Linda Darnell, Margaret Hamilton, Glenda Farrell and Leslie Brooks in City Without Men (1943)

In 1936, Dudley received a five-year contract with RKO. Her films included The Moon and Sixpence (1942), The Secret Fury (1950), City without Men (1943), and A Woman Rebels (1935). On radio, Dudley portrayed the title character's daughter, Peggy, in Meet Mr. Meek.

After she left acting, Dudley became a real-estate developer.

== Personal life ==
Dudley married engineer Theodore Kurrus in Brewster, New York, on June 6, 1932, when she was 14 years old. An annulment became final on May 4, 1936.

On April 29, 1936, Dudley shot herself in the chest with a .22 caliber rifle after an argument with her fiance, playwright Sidney Kingsley. New York City detectives ruled the incident an attempted suicide after they found a note indicating that she wanted to end her life because she "feared Mr. Kingsley's affection for her had waned." She was treated at York Hospital for "a superficial flesh wound".

Later in 1936, Dudley married Jack. E. Jenkins, a restaurant operator from Beverly Hills, in Yuma, Arizona. They had two sons, one of whom was child actor Butch Jenkins.

Dudley's personal interests included flying, and at one time she raised mink for fur.

== Death ==
On August 14, 1985, Dudley died of bone cancer in Greenville, Texas, aged 68. No service was held, and her ashes were buried at Mount Kisco, New York.
