= Night Without Sleep =

1952 American film by Roy Ward Baker

- Theatrical release poster
- Directed by: Roy Ward Baker
- Screenplay by: Elick Moll; Frank Partos
- Produced by: Robert Bassler
- Starring: Linda Darnell; Gary Merrill; Hildegarde Neff
- Cinematography: Lucien Ballard
- Edited by: Nick DeMaggio
- Music by: Cyril Mockridge
- Production company: Twentieth Century-Fox
- Distributed by: Twentieth Century-Fox
- Release date: September 26, 1952 (New York)
- Running time: 77 minutes
- Country: United States
- Language: English

Night Without Sleep is a 1952 American mystery film noir mystery film directed by Roy Ward Baker and starring Linda Darnell, Gary Merrill and Hildegarde Neff.

== Plot ==
Composer Richard Morton experiences blackouts and cannot account for his actions. He recalls a woman's screams and a conversation with his wife Emily, but it is all a blur. Morton visits his friend John Harkness and is introduced to film actress Julie Bannon, to whom he is attracted. He also has made a date with Lisa Muller, who is angry when Morton appears two hours late. He loses his temper and threatens her.

Julie attempts to seduce Morton, but he resists. He returns to Lisa and begins to menace her again, only to suffer another blackout. When he awakens, Morton is in his own home by himself and is unsure where he has been or what he has done. He phones Lisa and learns she is all right. Concerned, he contacts Julie as well, but she is also unharmed. Morton is glad that his violent temper did not cause him to lose control and that the woman's screams are all in his mind until finds his wife dead in the bedroom.

== Cast ==
- Linda Darnell as Julie Bannon
- Gary Merrill as Richard Morton
- Hildegarde Neff as Lisa Muller
- June Vincent as Emily Morton
- Hugh Beaumont as John Harkness
- Joyce MacKenzie as Laura Harkness
- Donald Randolph as Dr. Clarke
- Steven Geray as George
- Charles Tannen as Steve Brooks
- Louise Lorimer as Mrs. Carter
- William Forrest as Mr. Carter
- Benny Carter as Benny
- Bill Walker as Henry
- Beverly Tyler as Singer
- Mae Marsh as Maid

== Reception ==
In a contemporary review for The New York Times, critic Bosley Crowther wrote: "As hopeless a bout with insomnia as ever you want to endure is pictured in wearying progression in Twentieth Century-Fox's 'Night Without Sleep' ... Without spark, without inspiration, without intelligence and without suspense, this bleak exercise in morbid mooning moves slowly and barely, if at all."
