= The Lady Pays Off =

1951 film by Douglas Sirk

- Theatrical release poster
- Directed by: Douglas Sirk
- Written by: Albert J. Cohen; Frank Gill, Jr.
- Produced by: Albert J. Cohen
- Starring: Linda Darnell; Stephen McNally; Gigi Perreau
- Cinematography: William H. Daniels
- Edited by: Russell F. Schoengarth
- Music by: Frank Skinner
- Production company: Universal International Pictures
- Distributed by: Universal International Pictures
- Release date: December 7, 1951 (Los Angeles)
- Running time: 80 minutes
- Country: United States
- Language: English

The Lady Pays Off is a 1951 American romantic comedy film directed by Douglas Sirk and starring Linda Darnell, Stephen McNally and Gigi Perreau. The plot concerns a teacher with a large gambling debt that she must pay in an unusual manner.

== Plot ==
Evelyn Walsh Warren is named the teacher of the year and her photo appears on the cover of Time magazine, but she is dissatisfied with her uneventful life. She travels to Reno and inadvertently loses $7000 at the roulette table, mistaking $100 chips for $1 chips. Casino owner Matt Braddock offers her a deal. He will forgive her debt if she can identify the cause of his nine-year-old daughter Diane's behavior. Diane seems depressed, will not eat and has been experiencing nightmares. When Evelyn refuses, he suggests that they cut cards for the debt. She draws a king but he cheats, pulling an ace. Defeated, she accompanies him to his home in Carmel, California.

Frustrated with her predicament, Evelyn is initially cold to Diane, but after overhearing Diane's telephone conversation with her father, Evelyn becomes ashamed of herself and quickly becomes Diane's friend. Soon, Diane is happy, pleasing Matt, and she tries to play matchmaker for Evelyn and her father.

Diane becomes frustrated when Kay Stoddard, Matt's old flame, appears. Diane steers Kay into some poison oak to eliminate Evelyn's competition. Evelyn, who has been hostile to Matt, gradually warms to him. When they take a fishing excursion on a boat, she secretly disables the motor to spend more time with him. Matt hails a commercial fishing boat to take them aboard. Evelyn is intoxicated by a seasickness remedy and admits to Matt that she has fallen for him, and they become engaged.

Matt sells his casino so that Evelyn will not be ashamed of him, but he is shocked when Evelyn informs him that it was all an act and she returns home. She receives a telephone call from Matt's housekeeper Marie informing her that Diane has run away. Evelyn flies to Carmel, where she and Matt blame each other. However, encouraged by Marie, Diane had just been hiding. Diane causes Matt and Evelyn to realize that they really do love each other.

== Cast ==
- Linda Darnell as Evelyn Walsh Warren
- Stephen McNally as Matt Braddock
- Gigi Perreau as Diane Braddock
- Virginia Field as Kay Stoddard
- Ann Codee as Marie
- Lynne Hunter as Minnie
- Nestor Paiva as Manuel
- James Griffith as Ronald
- Billy Wayne as Croupier
- Katherine Warren as Dean Bessie Howell
- William Newell as Bartender (as Billy Newell)
- Paul McVey as Speaker
- Tristram Coffin as Carl
- Judd Holdren as Face
- Nolan Leary as Doctor
- John Doucette as Cab Driver
- Ric Roman as Ricky

== Reception ==
In a contemporary review, the Los Angeles Times wrote: "The proceedings are all kept in light comedy gear and not only is the action snappy, but the dialogue sparkles."
