= Bide Dudley =

American dramatist

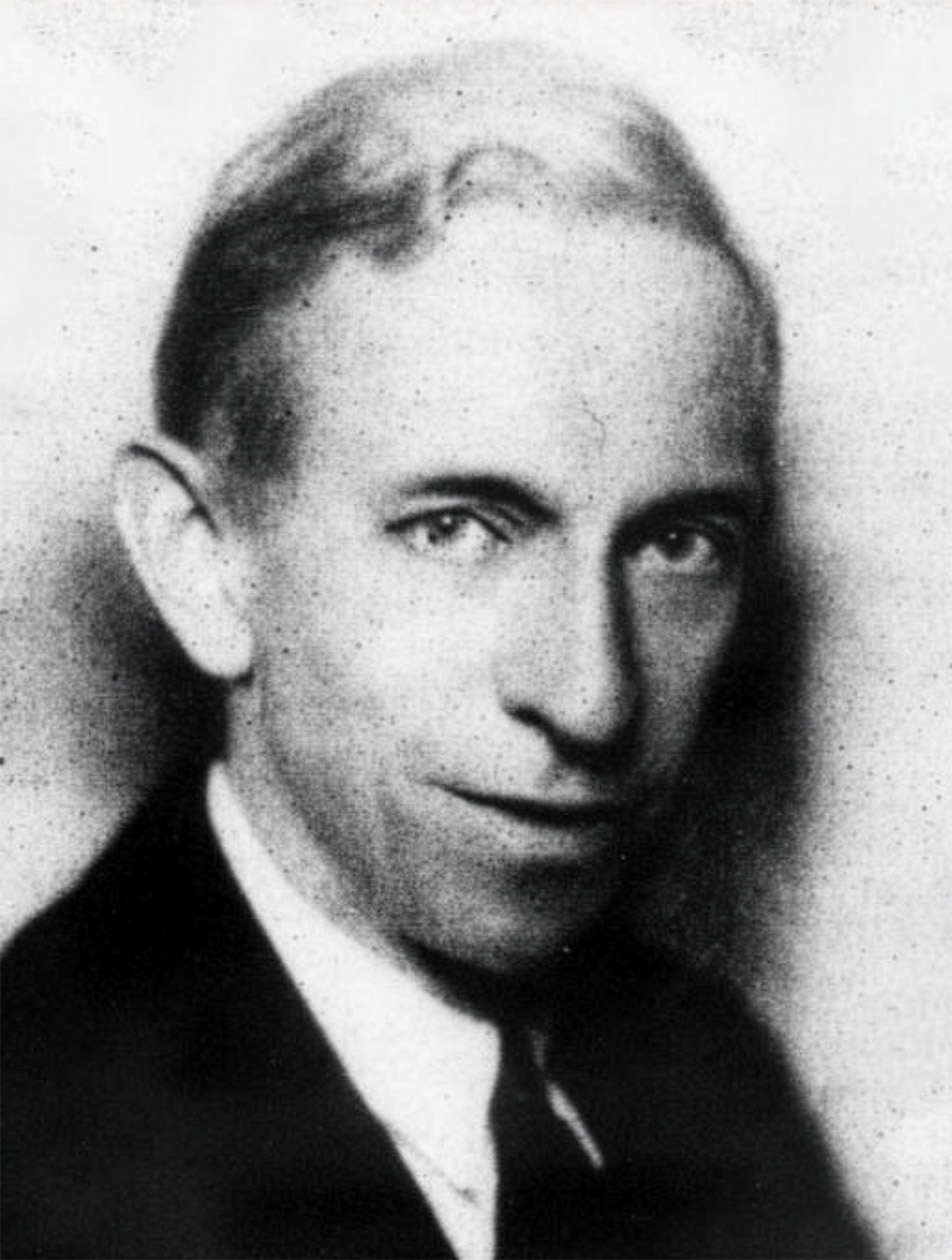
- Dudley around 1929
- Born: Walter Bronson Dudley; September 8, 1877; Minneapolis, Minnesota, U.S.
- Died: January 4, 1944 (aged 66)
- Occupation: Playwright

Walter Bronson Dudley, more commonly known as Bide Dudley (September 8, 1877 - January 4, 1944) was an American drama critic and playwright. His daughter was actress Doris Dudley.

== Early years ==
Dudley's parents were J. Todd Dudley and Ida Bronson Dudley. He was born in Minneapolis, but grew up primarily in Leavenworth, Kansas.

== Career ==
Dudley's early career included newspaper work in Denver, Kansas City, and St. Joseph, Missouri. For five years he wrote a humor column in The Denver Post. He moved to New York, where he wrote about drama for The New York Telegraph. In 1914 he became the drama critic for The Evening World.

Venturing into broadcasting, Dudley created the Theater Club radio program that featured anecdotes about activity on Broadway and news delivered in rhyme. He later became the drama critic for WOR radio.

Dudley's Broadway credits include Odds and Ends of 1917 (1917), Come Along (1919), The Little Whopper (1919), Oh, Henry (1920), Sue, Dear (1922), The Matinee Girl (1926), Bye, Bye, Bonnie (1927), and Borrowed Love (1929).

== Personal life and death ==
Dudley was married to the former Taney Keplinger; they were divorced in 1942. He died on January 4, 1944, aged 66, in Polyclinic Hospital in New York City.
