= Forever Amber (film) =

1947 film by Otto Preminger

- Theatrical release poster
- Directed by: Otto Preminger
- Screenplay by: Philip Dunne; Ring Lardner Jr.
- Story by: Jerome Cady
- Based on: Forever Amber by Kathleen Winsor
- Produced by: William Perlberg
- Starring: Linda Darnell; Cornel Wilde; Richard Greene; George Sanders; Glenn Langan; Richard Haydn; Jessica Tandy; Anne Revere
- Cinematography: Leon Shamroy
- Edited by: Louis R. Loeffler
- Music by: David Raksin
- Production company: 20th Century Fox
- Distributed by: 20th Century Fox
- Release date: October 22, 1947
- Running time: 138 minutes
- Country: United States
- Language: English
- Budget: $6.4 million
- Box office: $5 million (est. US/ Canada rentals)

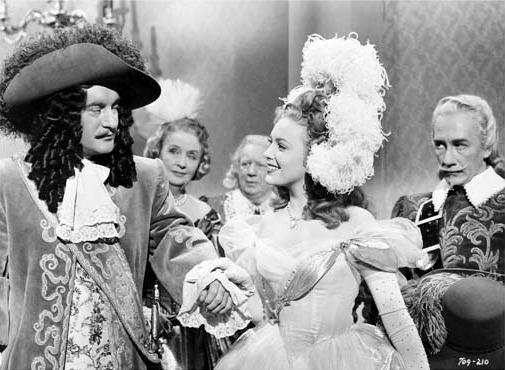
L-R: George Sanders, Linda Darnell, and Richard Haydn

Forever Amber is a 1947 American romantic historical drama film starring Linda Darnell and Cornel Wilde. It was based on the book of the same title by Kathleen Winsor. It also starred Richard Greene, George Sanders, Glenn Langan, Richard Haydn, and Jessica Tandy.

The film was adapted by Jerome Cady, Philip Dunne and Ring Lardner Jr., and directed by Otto Preminger, who replaced original director John M. Stahl after 39 days of filming and $300,000 of production. The movie was originally budgeted at $4.5 million.

The Hays Office had condemned the novel, but within a month of its publication the film rights had been purchased by 20th Century Fox. The film on its release was initially condemned by the National Legion of Decency.

In 1947, Darnell won the title role after the original star, newcomer Peggy Cummins, proved too inexperienced for the role. In the novel, the newborn Amber is named by her dying mother after the color of her father's eyes. The film's publicity compared the novel Forever Amber to Margaret Mitchell's novel Gone with the Wind. The search for an actress to portray Amber, a beauty who uses men to make her fortune in 17th-century England, was modeled on the extensive casting process for Scarlett O'Hara.

The film's score, by composer David Raksin, was nominated for the Oscar for Best Original Music Score.

== Plot ==
In 1644, during the English Civil War, a group of Roundheads pursue a Cavalier's carriage, which pauses to abandon a baby at a farmer's door. The Roundheads kill everyone aboard. The farmer and his wife adopt the infant, whose blanket is embroidered "Amber".

In 1660, the Restoration of the Monarchy begins. Sixteen-year-old Amber is a strong-willed beauty whose puritanical father has contracted her marriage to a farmer. Amber's dreams of an elegant life seem to come true when a group of Cavaliers arrives. She soon falls in love with the handsome Bruce Carlton. She begs Bruce to take her to London, but despite coaxing from his friend Almsbury, he refuses. Before the men leave for town, Bruce and Amber share a kiss.

Bruce and Almsbury are denied an audience with King Charles II. Back at their London tavern, Amber is waiting. Amber and Bruce begin an affair. He pampers her with new gowns and takes her to the theater. At one performance, Bruce approaches Barbara Villiers, a former girlfriend and the king's mistress, who asks her to persuade Charles to grant him ships for his privateer mission. Distraught at the thought of Bruce leaving, Amber stops Almsbury from warning Bruce that the king has arrived.

Charles later summons Bruce to court. Not wanting his friend to face the king's wrath alone, Almsbury goes with him. However, Charles grants Bruce's requests (to get rid of him as a potential rival) and sends him to Bristol that very night. At the tavern, Amber is sleeping. The next morning, she wakes to find Almsbury packing to return to Almsbury Hall, his ancestral home. The king has restored his rights. Bruce's room is empty. Almsbury tells Amber to go home, but she refuses. She will rise in station and marry Bruce, no matter what.

Almsbury gives her money from Bruce, but she is soon tricked and lands in Newgate, the debtors' prison, where she discovers that she is carrying Bruce's child. Black Jack Mallet, a highwayman, falls in love with her and helps her escape. They go to Mother Redcap's tavern, where Amber gives birth to a son, Bruce.

Amber lures fops into alleyways where Black Jack robs them. When Black Jack is killed by the king's guard, Amber flees and is discovered by Captain Rex Morgan. Captain Morgan takes her as his mistress and introduces her to theater friends. Soon, Amber works as an actress, and the Earl of Radcliffe takes an interest in her.

Almsbury, now married, comes to London and tells Amber that Bruce will return soon. Captain Morgan proposes, but she declines, believing she will reunite with Bruce. When Bruce returns, she turns down a chance to dine with the king. Amber introduces Bruce to their son, hoping he will want to settle down. When Morgan finds Bruce and Amber together, he challenges Bruce to a duel, saying that Amber is his fiancée. Bruce tries and fails to persuade Morgan to withdraw the challenge. Bruce kills Morgan and, blaming Amber, leaves England. Noting that he has killed a man and that their son is without a name, Bruce departs, saying, "May God forgive us both for our sins."

Amber marries the elderly Earl of Radcliffe, a widower, thereby becoming a countess. She departs her wedding reception early to find Bruce when she hears his ship has returned to London. But she soon discovers he has the Black Plague. Amber saves his life by killing a murderous, thieving nurse and lancing a boil on his chest. After Bruce discovers that Amber is married, he sails again for Virginia.

The Great Fire devastates London. Charles II plans to seduce Amber, but Radcliffe locks her in her room at home. While the fire rages in their house, Amber struggles with Radcliffe. A cruelly treated servant overpowers Radcliffe and throws him into the fire, killing him. Amber becomes Charles' mistress.

Bruce visits from Virginia with his wife, Corinna. He wants his son. Amber invites Corinna to dine with her and Charles, hoping that Charles will be attracted to a new face. Charles sees through the plot and allows Corinna to leave unmolested. Realizing that Amber still loves Bruce, Charles ends their relationship.

Bruce asks Amber for custody of their son. Thinking he will choose her, Amber asks the boy to decide. He states that he wants to go to Virginia with his father. Bruce invites Amber to come with them, but she stays and watches, heartbroken, as Bruce takes their son away.

== Cast ==
- Linda Darnell as Amber St. Clair
- Cornel Wilde as Bruce Carlton
- Richard Greene as Lord Harry Almsbury
- George Sanders as King Charles II
- Glenn Langan as Capt. Rex Morgan
- Richard Haydn as Earl of Radcliffe
- Jessica Tandy as Nan Britton
- Anne Revere as Mother Red Cap
- John Russell as Black Jack Mallard
- Jane Ball as Corinna Carlton
- Robert Coote as Sir Thomas Dudley
- Leo G. Carroll as Matt Goodgroome
- Natalie Draper as Countess of Castlemaine
- Margaret Wycherly as Mrs. Spong
- Alma Kruger as Lady Redmond
- Lillian Molieri aka Lupe Mayorga as Queen Catherine
- Norma Varden as Mrs. Abbott
- Alan Napier as Landale
- Ian Keith as Tybalt

== Production ==
=== Development ===
Forever Amber was adapted from Kathleen Winsor's debut novel published three years earlier. Macmillan, which had published Gone with the Wind, was excited about the book's commercial possibilities and launched it with an initial run of 175,000 copies. William du Bois of The New York Times called Winsor a "born storyteller". The same paper called the book "one of the most expertly packaged bundles of literature in years". The novel was number-one on The New York Times Best Seller List. However, the novel was banned in several countries, including Australia.

Before the novel was published, Winsor's agent suggested she should not submit her manuscript into a competition MGM was holding for first-time authors because the agent felt they could get more than the $125,000 prize money.

In November 1944, 20th Century Fox bought the screen rights for $200,000, one of the largest amounts paid for a novel. (By way of comparison, Edna Ferber received $175,000 for Saratoga Trunk; MGM paid $125,000 for Green Dolphin Street and $200,000 to A. J. Cronin for The Green Years; Ernest Hemingway was paid $150,000 for For Whom the Bell Tolls).

The following month, Winsor announced she had signed a contract with Fox to adapt her novel into a script with screenwriter Jerome Cady and producer William Perlberg, act as a technical advisor, and shoot a screen test. Cady finished the script by March. By August 1946, Philip Dunne had written another draft and John Stahl was hired to direct the film. At the time, Dunne was one of the studio's top screenwriters and Stahl had directed Leave Her to Heaven (1945) for Fox.

In a 1986 interview with Patrick McGilligan, Dunne later called the novel "worthless" and believed any adaptation "would be foolish to try to recover the intent of the author which is to please that part of the public that likes to lick its lips while reading." To placate the Production Code Administration (PCA), Amber's lovers was reduced from over 30 in the novel to five in the film. Winsor evidently had little involvement in the script and the film. "We had to be more straitlaced with Amber than we would with another picture", Perlberg explained, "Everyone is waiting for a chance to jump on us."

=== Casting ===
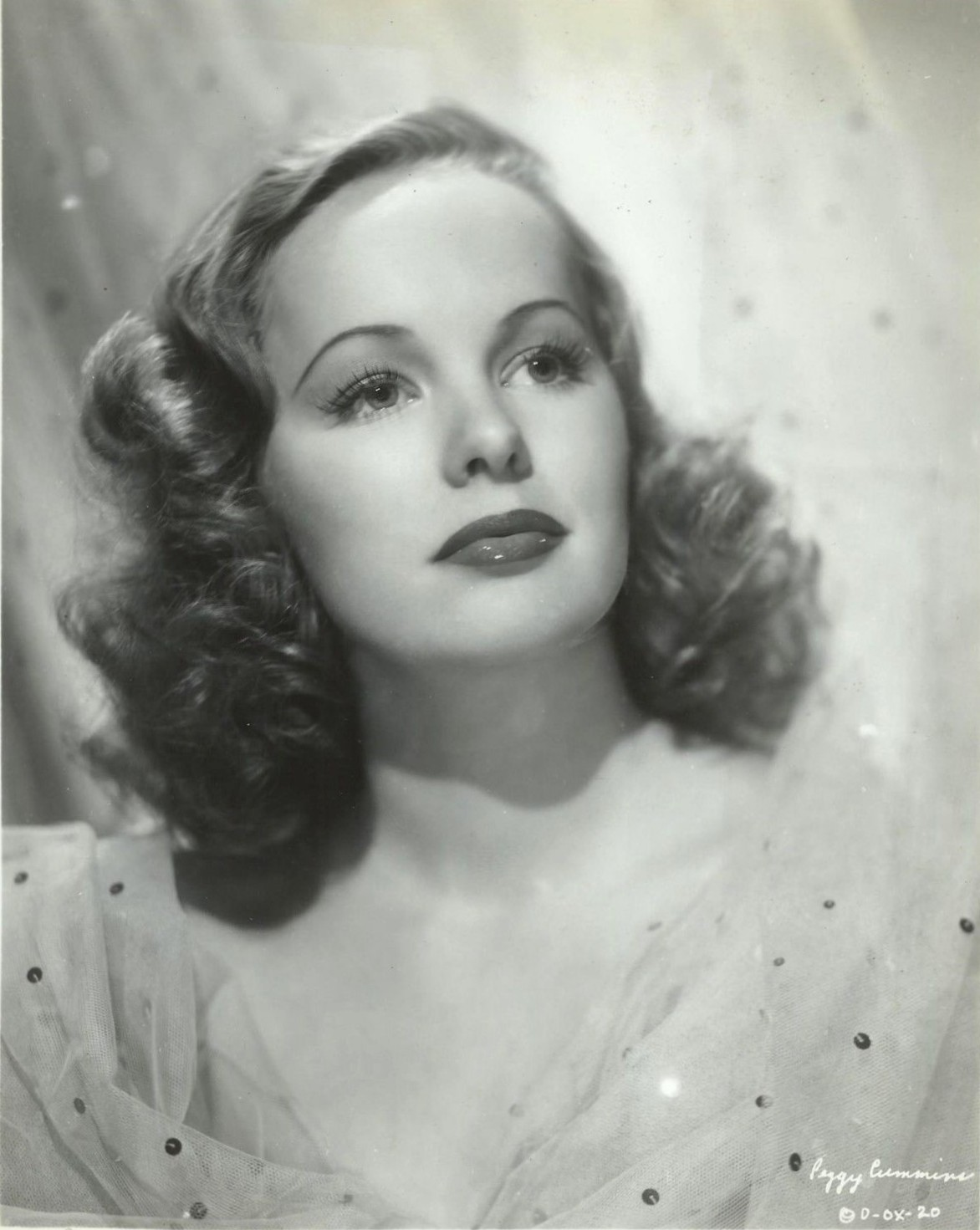
Peggy Cummins (pictured here in 1950) was initially cast in the title role of Amber St. Clair.

Similar to David O. Selznick's casting search for an actress to play Scarlett O'Hara, there was an extensive, well-publicised talent search for an actress to portray the title role of Amber St. Clair. In November 1944, Gene Tierney was reported to be the frontrunner. Maureen O'Hara, who was under contract to Fox, lobbied hard for the role, and even wore a period dress in the studio commissary. Paulette Goddard and Annette Simonds also lobbied for the part.

Perlberg told The New York Times he was searching for "a young Vivien Leigh" or "an English Lana Turner." Peggy Cummins, an Irish actress who had appeared on stage in Junior Miss, was reportedly the 37th actress who screen-tested for the role. By October 1945, she was the new frontrunner. In February 1946, studio president Darryl F. Zanuck announced that Cummins had been cast in the title role, along with Cornel Wilde as her main love interest, Bruce Carlton.

At the time, Wilde was, after Tyrone Power, the leading "swashbuckling" style star under contract to Fox. Richard Greene was the other leading contender for the part, and Wilde was suspended at Fox due to a dispute over roles. However, Zanuck decided on Wilde, and the suspension was lifted. James Mason, who had starred in The Seventh Veil (1945), was offered the role but declined because he thought it was "a silly book" and the "script didn't improve it".

By December 1945, Reginald Gardiner was cast as Charles II. Glenn Langan was cast by January 1946. By February 1946, Vincent Price was cast in a supporting role as Lord Almsbury, a friend of Bruce Carlton.

=== Production under John Stahl ===
Principal photography began in March 1946, with a planned shooting schedule intended to last 103 days. Cummins was to appear in every scene but one. During filming, on March 30, Cummins collapsed on set due to illness. Filming was halted twice, reportedly due to illness on Cummins' part. On April 30, after 39 days of filming and $1 million had been spent, Fox announced that production was suspended for three months. Cummins and Stahl were later assigned to other projects. Zanuck issued a statement, explaining the film had been "suspended until late summer due to the quality of the film, so far shot, not measuring up to the high standard originally planned."

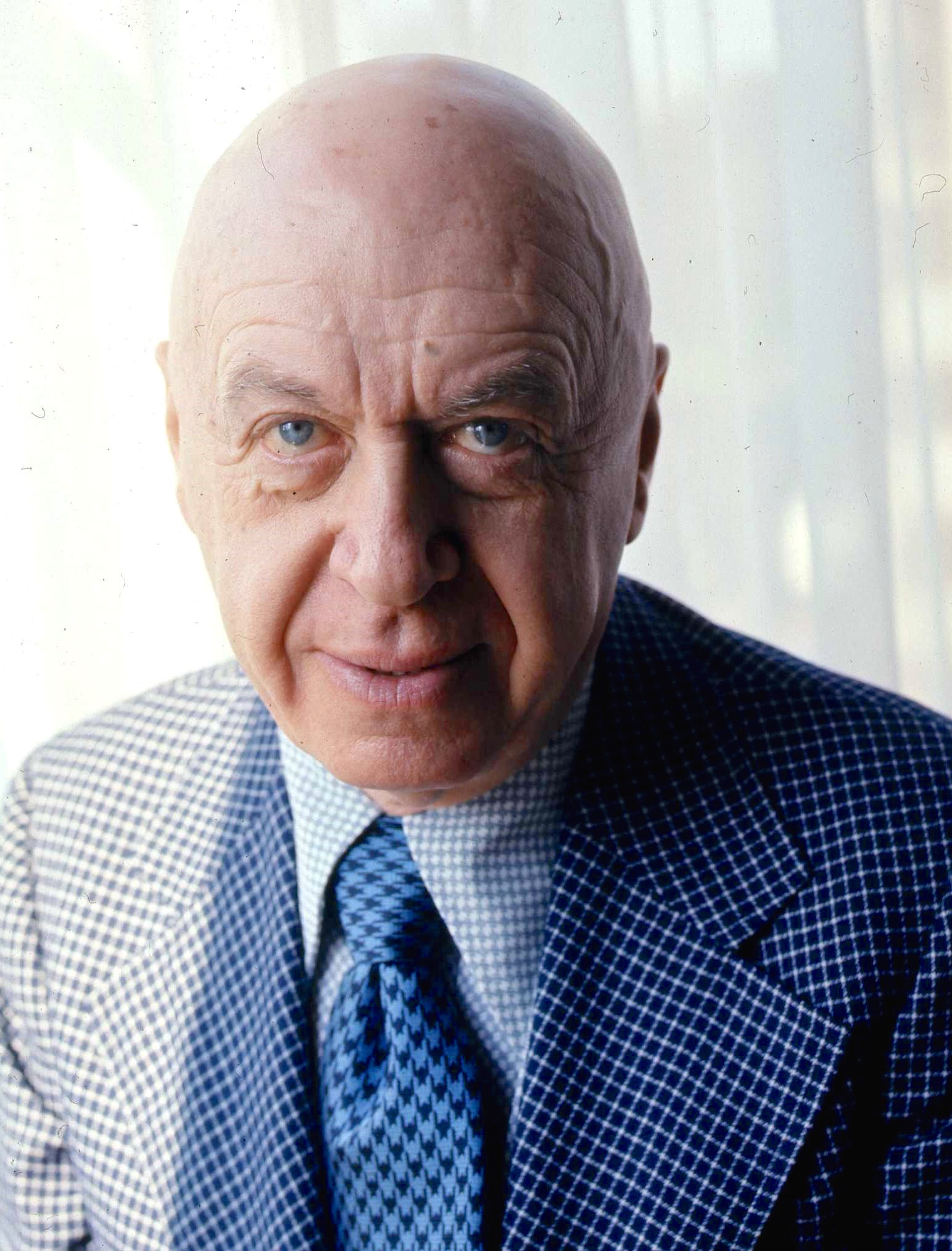
Otto Preminger (pictured in 1973) wrote that the initial production had been paused because "somehow all the elements didn't jell".

The New York Times explained that studio executives felt Cummins had appeared too young to play Amber as the character aged in the story. Nevertheless, Cummins remained under contract to Fox and was cast in The Late George Apley (1947), Moss Rose (1947), and Escape (1948). However, she left the studio in 1948.

=== Production under Otto Preminger ===
In June 1946, Fox announced that Otto Preminger had taken over as director, and the film would resume production in September. Preminger said he would use Stahl's draft, which the Production Office had approved. It was also announced that none of the earlier footage featuring Peggy Cummins would be used, which would cost the studio $300,000. He later wrote in his memoir that he did not want to make the film because he disliked the novel, but Zanuck forced him under his contract. Nevertheless, Preminger hired Ring Lardner Jr. to rewrite Dunne's script. Dunne later recalled he and Lardner "both had great distaste for the material... We divided it up because the steam was on... They wanted to get it restarted as soon as possible."

In July, Linda Darnell was announced as Cummins' replacement. Preminger wrote that despite Zanuck's insistence, he did not want Darnell and would have preferred an actress like Lana Turner, whom he felt could have been borrowed from MGM. Aside from Darnell, Richard Greene (making his first Hollywood film in seven years) replaced Vincent Price. George Sanders replaced Reginald Gardiner as Charles II. John Russell, a newcomer actor, was cast as Black Jack Russell.

Wilde was reluctant to return to the film. Fox considered replacing him with Stewart Granger, though this would have been difficult due to Granger's other commitments. In October 1946, before filming was to resume, Wilde announced he would not return to the role unless he was given a salary increase. At the time, he was paid $3,000 a week but wanted an arrangement comparable to Betty Grable, who made two films a year at $150,000 a film.

Wilde said, "My agent said that since I am leading the whole Fox lot in fan mail I should be getting money comparable to that received by the top people at the studio. I am worth much more to the company than I was a year ago [when his contract was renegotiated] and an actor must insure himself against the time when he is no longer wanted." The dispute was settled when 20th Century Fox raised his salary to $5,000 a week.

Filming resumed in October 1946 and ended in March 1947.

== Release ==
Forever Amber was completed and released in New York in October 1947.

== Reception ==
=== Box office ===
Forever Amber played 451 dates during its first week. Fox claimed that it had achieved the biggest box-office opening figures in the entire industry. Variety reported the opening receipts were by far the largest raised by one picture first week since they had been tabulating grosses across the country in 1946. In the 17 theatres they received reports from, they claimed it had grossed slightly better than $700,000.

The film played with increased admission prices compared to most films ($1.20). It set a house record at the Roxy in New York ($180,589). In the following week, Variety's reporting had 27 theatres playing the movie which in total grossed close to $800,000 taking its gross to $1.5 million in two weeks.

=== Critical reception ===
Bosley Crowther of The New York Times wrote a mixed review, stating, "For not only was it the climax of a three-year-long Hollywood ordeal that of subduing Kathleen Winsor's famous harlot to the decorum of the screen which in itself was an epic achievement that the press agents viewed with wondering gasps; but, despite all the purity precautions, the picture took a slap in the teeth on the very day that it opened which might have rung down the halls of time."

Abel Green of Variety praised Darnell's performance and further wrote "the sum total compels an intra-trade salute to the Zanuck factory for successfully shadow-boxing with existing tabus and regulations, and coming up so satisfactorily with the finished product." Harrison's Reports called the film: "A great spectacle, magnificently produced and photographed superbly in subdued Technicolor ...Linda Darnell turns in a surprisingly good performance, and her beauty, enhanced by the rich and revealing costumes of the period, is easy on the eyes. All the others in the cast turn in creditable performances, but none match the superb playing of George Sanders, as Charles II, who walks off with every scene he appears in."

James Agee of Time magazine wrote: Forever Amber "is every bit as good a movie as it was a novel. But it may not be as sensationally popular as Kathleen Winsor's account of a Slut's Progress. Many who admired the book may be disappointed to learn that in the picture Amber is allowed only four of her numerous lovers. What's more, she gets an even crueler comeuppance, without (as far as the camera can see) having much fun earning it."

Pauline Kael wrote: "The bowdlerization follows Kathleen Winsor's novel as if her narrative line had been carved in sacred stone; maybe the literalness is what does it in, despite the efforts of the director, Otto Preminger, to be colorful and gamy. In this view of the Restoration, all males are so sex-starved that a sudden glance from a female reduces them to gibbering lust. Linda Darnell is rounded and enticing but she doesn't have the flash or variety to carry off the starring role." Leonard Maltin gave the film three of four stars: " 'Musical Beds' costumer, taken from Kathleen Winsor's once-scandalous novel ... Lengthy but colorful and entertaining ... "

=== Catholic condemnation ===
The film was condemned by Cardinal Francis Spellman and the Legion of Decency who threatened a boycott of Catholic theatregoers. Fox originally decided to fight the ban claiming the ruling was "harsh" and "unfair" considering all the effort they put in to get the movie past the censors.

The studio changed its mind. A number of changes were made to the film, including adding a prologue which criticised Amber, saying, "the wages of sin is death" and adding an epilogue where Cornel Wilde says "may God have mercy on both of us for our sins." The film was re-released in December 1947.

== Accolades ==
The film is recognized by the American Film Institute in these lists:

- 2005: AFI's 100 Years of Film Scores – Nominated

== Proposed remake ==
In 1986, there was speculation Raquel Welch was due to appear in a television miniseries version of the novel. It was never made.

== Bibliography ==
- Hirsch, Foster (2007). Otto Preminger: The Man Who Would Be King. New York: Alfred A. Knopf. ISBN 978-0-375-41373-5.
- McGilligan, Patrick (1986). Backstory: Interviews with Screenwriters of Hollywood's Golden Age. University of California Press.
- Preminger, Otto (1977). Preminger: An Autobiography. Garden City, NY: Doubleday. ISBN 978-0-385-03480-7.
