= Forever Amber (novel) =

1944 novel by Kathleen Winsor

- First-edition cover
- Author: Kathleen Winsor
- Cover artist: Jean Des Vignes
- Genre: Romance novel
- Set in: 17th-century England
- Publisher: Macmillan
- Publication date: 16 October 1944

Forever Amber (1944) is a historical romance novel by Kathleen Winsor set in 17th-century England. It was made into a film in 1947 by 20th Century Fox.

Forever Amber tells the story of an orphaned Amber St. Clare, who makes her way up through the ranks of 17th-century English society by sleeping with or marrying successively richer and more important men while keeping her love for the one man she can never have. The subplot of the novel follows Charles II of England as he returns from exile and adjusts to ruling England. The novel includes portrayals of Restoration fashion, including the introduction and popularization of tea in English coffeehouses and the homes of the fashionably rich; politics; and public disasters, including the plague and the Great Fire of London. Many notable historical figures appear in the book, including Charles II of England, members of his court, and several of his mistresses including Nell Gwyn.

Winsor's inspiration for the book came from her first husband, who had written his undergraduate thesis on Charles II, completed while he was serving in the army. She read books on the period and wrote numerous drafts of what would become Forever Amber.

== Plot ==
Judith Marsh has been engaged since birth to her neighbor, John Mainwaring, heir to the Earl of Rosswood. In 1644, her family break off the engagement when they and the Mainwarings find themselves on opposing sides of the English Civil War. During a break in the fighting, John secretly visits Judith and the two, deeply in love, consummate their relationship. Pregnant, Judith abandons her family and goes to Parliamentarian territory on John's instructions, introducing herself as Judith St. Clare. There, she stays with farmer Matthew Goodegroome and his wife Sarah, who are ignorant of her true identity, seen only as a “woman of quality”. Judith tragically dies in childbirth after naming her daughter Amber (after the color of John's eyes). John is never told of her death or the whereabouts of his child.

In 1660, Amber, now a very beautiful and flirtatious teenager, is being raised by the Goodegroomes, as her “Aunt and Uncle”; they have kept her ignorant of her noble origins. She meets a band of Royalists who inform her that Charles II of England is returning and they are riding to London. Amber is instantly attracted to Lord Bruce Carlton, who is equally smitten with her beauty. During a fair, they wander off into the woods and she loses her virginity to him. After she persuades him, Carlton reluctantly takes her to London, but bluntly tells Amber he will not marry her and she will come to regret her choice.

In London, Carlton and Amber live together, with Amber as his mistress. She quickly grows to love London and becomes accustomed to their luxurious lifestyle. She however still secretly longs to marry Carlton and naively believes if she becomes pregnant he will marry her. However, when she does become pregnant, Carlton, reproaching himself, is only sorry for her, knowing this will further ruin her future; however it does not change his mind on marriage. Carlton, though fond of her, is selfishly aware his marriage should be of similar noble background. He announces plans to become a privateer in order to grow his fortune and is soon leaving. He leaves Amber a significant amount of money along with hasty instructions, telling her if she is clever she can legitimize herself and her child by marrying well. Left alone, Amber, very naive and out of her depth, is easily duped into befriending a sly conwoman named Sally Goodman. Amber, passing herself off as a rich country heiress, is seen as an easy target. Sally introduces Amber to her nephew Luke Channell, a vile con artist, hoping to get to Amber's supposed wealth. Amber, ignorant and desperate, quickly marries Luke, fearing that her pregnancy will soon be visible. She soon discovers Sally and Luke are not who they appear. When they realize she is not as wealthy as she claimed, they furiously steal her money and abandon her, leaving her penniless. Amber is pursued by creditors and taken to a debtors' prison. Salvation comes when she catches the eye of famous Black Jack Mallard, a highwayman who she begins an affair with inside the prison for protection. Black Jack bribes the guards with an enormous amount of money to take her with him when he escapes. Black Jack takes Amber to Whitefriars, where she is introduced to the ways of criminals and soon gives birth to a son, Bruce, who she allows to go live with a countrywoman to be raised in a healthier environment. Intent on using Amber’s beauty to enrich themselves, Black Jack’s gang hire a student of noble birth, Michael Godfrey, to educate Amber to sound like an aristocrat, and begin to use her as bait in schemes where she lures rich men of quality to quiet secluded locations for Black Jack to rob them.

Upon her arrival at Whitefriers, Amber instantly attracted the jealous attention of Bess, Black Jack's former lover, whose constant jealous behavior towards Amber finally results in Bess being kicked out. Bess, enraged with jealousy and hate, avenges herself by setting up a trap for Black Jack, Amber, and his conspirators during their next robbery. Black Jack is caught and sentenced to death, Bess is also arrested due to her criminal background and sent to prison. Amber manages to escape and she happens upon Michael in the street, who offers her a place to stay and protection in return for a sexual relationship. Amber, having no where else to go, and frightened of being arrested, moves in and becomes his mistress.

Terrified that her debts will one day catch up with her, Amber learns that actors are protected from arrest (through being servants of the King) and uses her connections to find a position with the King's Company. Though she is not a great actress, Amber uses her beauty to earn larger parts, hoping to attract the attention of a man who can afford to keep her as his mistress. She catches the eye of Captain Rex Morgan, the paramour of fellow actress Beck Marshall, and succeeds in persuading him to pay to keep her. Morgan falls in love with Amber and offers to marry her, but she resists, wanting a wealthier husband. Amber eventually attracts the attention of the King and sleeps with him twice before his mistress, Barbara Palmer, intervenes. Depressed, Amber decides to marry Rex, but Bruce returns from his travels, and Amber realizes she is still in love with him. This leads to a duel between Bruce and Rex, resulting in Rex dying and Bruce leaving once more.

Now bereft, Amber falls deeper into prostitution. Shunned and unwell following an abortion, she flees to Tunbridge Wells where she meets a rich elderly widower, Samuel Dangerfield, and seduces him into marriage by pretending to be a modest young widow. Dangerfield's puritanical family is horrified, though she becomes friends with his daughter Jemima, who is only a few years younger than herself. Amber discovers her new husband is financing Bruce, and re-starts her affair with him, hoping to conceive a child she can pass off as her husband's. Amber becomes pregnant then discovers her stepdaughter is also pregnant by Bruce, who abandons both of them. Amber finds a suitable husband for Jemima and is left extremely wealthy after Samuel dies. Shortly after their child is born Bruce returns, and both he and Amber contract plague. They both survive but Bruce abandons her again, and Amber decides to marry for a third time, to the avaricious but influential Earl of Radclyffe.

Now a countess, Amber intends to go to court and become the King's favored mistress, replacing Barbara Palmer. Her husband interferes in these plans and forces her to move to the country. As revenge, Amber seduces her new husband's son and is discovered. Her husband attempts to poison the pair, succeeding in killing his son. The Earl then flees to London, where Amber has him killed (using the Great Fire of London to cover up the crime).

Finally free, she becomes the King's mistress and becomes pregnant by him. The King arranges a marriage – Amber's fourth – to Gerald Stanhope. Bruce returns, and Amber continues cheating on her husband with both the King and Bruce. Bruce reveals that he is married and intends to make their son his lawful heir, to which Amber reluctantly consents, knowing it will secure his future. Amber becomes the King's primary and official mistress, and he makes her Duchess of Ravenspur. As Amber is at the height of her power and influence, Bruce returns once again with his wife, and resumes his affair with Amber. Bruce's wife, Corinna discovers the affair and Bruce finally leaves Amber for good. Amber confronts Corinna, revealing that she is the mother of Bruce's son. While the two are quarreling, Bruce returns and he and Amber get into a violent physical fight, broken up by a heavily pregnant Corinna. The fight induces Corinna’s labor. Bruce cuts off all contact with Amber following the fight, and the couple plan to sail to America as soon as Corinna can travel. Amber is despondent at the thought of losing him forever.

Unbeknownst to Amber, the Duke of Buckingham (one of the influential men to which Amber prostituted herself) decides Amber is a threat and makes a plan with a former enemy, Lord Arlington, to get rid of her. After Bruce sets sail, Bennet writes Amber a note claiming Corinna has died on the voyage. A hopeful Amber leaves England for America in pursuit of Bruce, hoping he will finally marry her, unaware that Corinna is alive and well. We are left wondering about her arrival across the sea.

== Characters ==
=== Original characters ===
- Amber St. Clare – The illegitimate daughter of two nobles who is raised by well-off farmers ignorant of her origins. She is extremely beautiful and ambitious but also selfish and naive. She rises through the court; first becoming a Countess, then as the King’s favorite mistress, a Duchess.
- Lord Bruce Carlton – A free-spirited but self-serving Royalist, thirteen years older than Amber, who spent his formative years in exile following Charles II of England's wandering court. A selfish womanizer, he has many affairs with multiple key women throughout the story, having children with several.
- Lord Almsbury – a close friend of Bruce Carlton's who is also in love with Amber. He tried to make Amber his mistress, however they eventually maintain a casual affair, only sleeping together while Bruce is away, which the three of them see as natural arrangement. He settles down and marries, being more willing to stay at home and play politics to secure his fortune, unlike Carlton.
- Nan Britton – Amber's fiercely loyal maid and only female friend.
- Black Jack Mallard – an extremely tall, clever, and lustful highwayman who uses his savvy and wealth to escape with Amber from debtors' prison. He uses her in his criminal organization.
- Michael Godfrey – a young bon vivant law student who falls in love with Amber and introduces her to a life of hedonism.
- Captain Rex Morgan – a swashbuckling lothario who keeps many mistresses but is deeply in love with Amber, wanting to marry her despite knowing that she is married and has a child by another man.
- Samuel Dangerfield – a kindly respectable 60-year-old widower and one of the richest men in England, this self-made man is very attracted to Amber and quickly finds himself Amber's second husband. He has an enormous family, who almost all despise Amber, seeing her for what she is. Amber is generally fond of him and he leaves her an enormous fortune.
- Earl of Radclyffe – Amber's evil ugly and indebted third husband is both impotent and abusive. Unbeknownst to Amber he was once engaged to marry her mother, Judith, before she ran away, leading him to pine after her for the rest of his life. Reluctantly agreeing to marry him, she trades her wealth for his title, becoming a Countess.
- Gerald Stanhope – Amber's fourth husband who is the timid foppish first son of a family that went bankrupt during the civil war. The King suggests the marriage to cover up her pregnancy by him. Gerald allows Amber to dominate him, and eventually allows her to pay him off so that she may live freely while he lives with his mistress. He and his family profit enormously from the marriage to Amber, with the Kind making him first an Earl, than a Duke, to raise Amber’s status at court.
- Bruce – Amber and Bruce Carlton's son, born of the first period of their long affair. Carlton makes Bruce his heir and takes him to America with him.
- Susanna Dangerfield – Amber and Bruce's daughter, born during their affair during Amber's marriage to Samuel Dangerfield and passed off as a Dangerfield child. She is very much like her mother in both looks and temperament.
- Charles Stanhope – Amber's third child born of her affair with Charles II, King of England. He looks very much like his biological father and is named Charles after him. Amber is able to use Gerald Stanhope’s surname to legitimize him, being her husband at the time of his birth. Amber uses his birth to improve her social standing at the court, with the king eventually making her a Duchess.

=== Historical figures ===
- Charles II of England – The newly returned King of England who is well known for his voracious sexual appetite, good-temper, and political savvy.
- Barbara Palmer, 1st Duchess of Cleveland – The king's one-time favorite mistress who is an ill-tempered but extremely beautiful woman who is ambitious and enjoys scheming.
- George Villiers, 2nd Duke of Buckingham – A perverse man who enjoys scheming and making enemies of his friends. He is Barbara Palmer's cousin.
- Frances Stewart, Duchess of Richmond – a beautiful young noblewoman who attracts the King's attention but famously refuses to become his mistress.
- Catherine of Braganza – Charles' Portuguese wife. Small of stature and very modest due to her Catholic upbringing, she is devoted to her husband and puts up with his affairs. He remains loyal to her as well, despite her inability to produce an heir.

== Publication ==
After five drafts, Forever Amber was accepted for publication. After editing, the two and a half million-word manuscript was reduced to a fifth of its original size. The published novel was 972 pages long. A condensed version was published as an Armed Services Edition during WWII.

== Critical reception ==
While many reviewers "praised the story for its relevance, comparing Amber's fortitude during the plague and fire to that of the women who held hearth and home together through the blitzes of World War II", others condemned it for its blatant sexual references. Fourteen US states banned the book as pornography. The first was Massachusetts, whose attorney general cited 70 references to sexual intercourse, 39 illegitimate pregnancies, 7 abortions, and "10 descriptions of women undressing in front of men" as reasons for banning the novel. Winsor denied that her book was particularly daring and said that she had no interest in explicit scenes. "I wrote only two sexy passages," she remarked, "and my publishers took both of them out. They put in ellipses instead. In those days, you know, you could solve everything with an ellipsis."

Despite its banning, Forever Amber was the best-selling US novel of the 1940s. It sold over 100,000 copies in its first week of release, and went on to sell over three million copies. Forever Amber was also responsible for popularizing "Amber" as a given name for girls in the 20th century.

Arthur D. Howden Smith, reviewing Forever Amber for the Saturday Review, praised the novel. Smith wrote that the novel "seethes with life. Its action never flags."

The novel was quite popular with the personnel of the USS Astoria in the Second World War, with a copy circulating through the crew.

The book was condemned by the Catholic Church for indecency, which helped its popularity. One critic went so far as to number each of the passages to which he objected. A film adaptation by 20th Century Fox was finally completed after substantial changes to the script were made, toning down some of the book's most objectionable passages in order to appease Catholic media critics.

The book was banned in August 1945 in Australia. The Minister for Customs, Senator Richard Keane, said "The Almighty did not give people eyes to read that rubbish."

== Cultural references ==
- Amber St. Clair appears as a historical character in The League of Extraordinary Gentlemen as a member of the first incarnation of the League in the 17th century, Prospero's Men.
- Captain Beefheart references Forever Amber in the lyrics of the song "Pachuco Cadaver" on the album Trout Mask Replica.
- Ernest Ambler, Director of the United States' National Bureau of Standards (1975–89), was commemorated by a sandwich, "Forever Ambler, or the Importance of Being Ernest," that was served at Roy's Place, a popular sandwich shop in Gaithersburg, Maryland.
