= 1946 in television =

The year 1946 in television involved some significant events. Below is a list of television-related events during 1946.

== Events ==
- February 4 – RCA demonstrates an all-electronic color television system.
- February 18 – The first Washington, D.C. – New York City telecast through AT&T corporation's coaxial cable, in which General Dwight Eisenhower places a wreath at the base of the statue in the Lincoln Memorial and others make brief speeches, is termed a success by engineers, although Time magazine calls it "as blurred as an early Chaplin movie."
- February 25 – The prewar U.S. 18-channel VHF allocation is officially ended in favor of a new 13-channel VHF allocation due to the appropriation of some frequencies by the military and the relocation of FM radio. Only five of the old channels are the same as new channels in terms of frequency and none have the same number as before.
- April 22 – CBS transmits a Technicolor movie short and color slides by coaxial cable from Manhattan to Washington (332 kilometers) and return.
- June 7 – The BBC Television Service begins broadcasting again for the first time since 1939. The first words heard are "Good afternoon everybody. How are you? Do you remember me, Jasmine Bligh?". Twenty minutes later, the Mickey Mouse cartoon Mickey's Gala Premiere, last programme transmitted seven years earlier at the start of World War II, is reshown.
- June 19 – The first televised heavyweight boxing title fight between Joe Louis and Billy Conn is broadcast from Yankee Stadium. The fight is seen by 141,000 people, the largest television audience to see a boxing match to this date.
- July 7 – Broadcasting of the BBC's children's programme For The Children is resumed, one of the few pre-war programmes to resume after reintroduction of the service.
- August 4 – Children's puppet "Muffin the Mule" debuts in an episode of the series For the Children. He is so popular he is given his own show later that same year.
- September 6 – Chicago's WBKB-TV (now WBBM-TV) commences broadcasting as the first U.S. television station outside the Eastern Time Zone.
- September 15 – DuMont Television Network begins broadcasting regularly in the United States.
- October 2 – The first television network soap opera, Faraway Hill, is broadcast by DuMont.
- October 22 – Telecrime, the first television crime series from the 1930s, is resumed by the BBC, retitled Telecrimes.
- December 24 – The first Christmas church service is telecast, Grace Episcopal Church in New York, on WABD.
- Tokyo Tsushin Kogyo founds a company, which would later become Sony.
- Zoomar introduces the first professional zoom lens for television cameras.
- The first postwar television sets are released by the companies RCA, DuMont, Crosley, and Belmont.

== Debuts ==
- January 4 - You Be the Judge premieres on CBS
- May 9 – The first regularly scheduled American variety show, Hour Glass, premieres on NBC (1946–1947).
- May 23 - Let's Play Reporter premieres on WABD-TV, but produced by ABC
- June 9 - Face to Face premieres on NBC (1946–1947).
- June 9 - Geographically Speaking premieres on NBC (1946–1947)
- June 20 - Cash and Carry premieres on the DuMont network (1946–1947).
- August 30 - I Love to Eat premieres on NBC (1946–1947).
- September 24 – Play the Game (1946), a US game show.
- October 2 - Faraway Hill, the first network-televised soap opera, debuts on DuMont.
- November 2 – Kaleidoscope (UK) (1946–1953).
- November 15 - Let's Rhumba premieres on NBC (1946–1947).
- November 17 - Television Screen Magazine premieres on NBC (1946–1949).
- November 29 – Pinwright's Progress (UK), British television's first situation comedy, debuts on the BBC Television Service (1946–1947).
- December 27 - Campus Hoopla premieres (1946–1947).
- Boxing From St. Nicholas Arena (1946–1948)
- See What You Know (1946–1949)
- You Are an Artist premieres on NBC (1946–1950).
- Gillette Cavalcade of Sports (1946–1960).
- Paging You premieres (1946–1948).
- Muffin the Mule (UK) premieres (1946–1955).
- Saturday Revue (1946-1947)

== Television shows ==
=== UK ===
Series	Debut	Ended
Picture Page (UK)	October 8, 1936	1939
Picture Page (UK)	1946	1952
Starlight (UK)	November 3, 1936	1939
Starlight (UK)	1946	1949
For The Children (UK)	April 24, 1937	1939
For The Children (UK)	July 7, 1946	1950
Telecrime (UK)	August 10, 1938	July 25, 1939
Telecrime (UK)	October 22, 1946	November 25, 1946
Kaleidoscope (UK)	November 2, 1946	1953
Pinwright's Progress (UK)	November 29, 1946	May 16, 1947
Muffin the Mule (UK)	1946	1955
Paging You (UK)	1946	1948

=== USA ===
Series	Debut	Ended	Network
Boxing From St. Nicholas Arena	1946	1948	NBC
You Be the Judge	1946	194?	CBS
See What You Know	1946	1949	CBS
Hour Glass	May 9, 1946	March 1947	NBC
Face to Face	June 9, 1946	January 26, 1947	NBC
Geographically Speaking	June 9, 1946	October 1947	NBC
Cash and Carry	June 20, 1946	July 1, 1947	Dumont
I Love to Eat	August 30, 1946	1947	NBC
Play the Game	September 24, 1946	December 17, 1946	Dumont
Faraway Hill	October 2, 1946	December 18, 1946	Dumont
You Are an Artist	November 1, 1946	1950	NBC
Gillette Cavalcade of Sports	November 8, 1946	June 24, 1960	NBC
Let's Rhumba	1946	1947	NBC
Television Screen Magazine	1946	1949	NBC
Campus Hoopla	1946	1947	NBC
Western Movie	1946	1947	Dumont

== Programs ending ==
Date	Show	Debut
June 4	Thrills and Chills Everywhere	August 27, 1941
November 25	Missus Goes a Shopping	1944
November 25	Telecrime (UK)	1938
December 17	Play the Game	1946
Unknown	Paging You	1946

== Births ==
- January 5 – Diane Keaton, actress (died 2025)
- January 19 – Dolly Parton, country singer-songwriter and actress (died 2026)
- January 20 – David Lynch, director and actor, Twin Peaks (died 2025)
- January 24 – Michael Ontkean, Canadian actor, The Rookies, Twin Peaks
- January 28 – Don Reo, producer
- February 1
  - Elisabeth Sladen, English actress, Doctor Who (died 2011)
  - Bart Braverman, actor, Vega$
- February 2 – Blake Clark, actor, Home Improvement, Boy Meets World
- February 7 – Pete Postlethwaite, English actor (died 2011)
- February 8 – Alex Diakun, actor
- February 13 – Joe Estevez, actor
- February 17 – Lynne Moody, actress, Roots
- February 20
  - Brenda Blethyn, English actress, Vera
  - Sandy Duncan, actress, The Hogan Family
- February 21
  - Tyne Daly, actress, Cagney & Lacey
  - Alan Rickman, English actor (died 2016)
- March 5 – Michael Warren, actor, Hill Street Blues
- March 6 – Martin Kove, actor, Cagney & Lacey
- March 7
  - John Heard, actor (died 2017)
  - Dan Grimaldi, actor
- March 12
  - Frank Welker, voice actor
  - Liza Minnelli, singer and actress
- March 15 – Howard E. Scott, singer
- March 17 – Harold Ray Brown, singer
- March 21 – Timothy Dalton, Welsh actor, Penny Dreadful
- March 26 – Johnny Crawford, actor, The Rifleman (died 2020)
- April 5 – Jane Asher, English actress
- April 8 – Tim Thomerson, actor and comedian
- April 10 – David Angell, screenwriter and television producer (died 2001)
- April 12 – Ed O'Neill, actor, Married... with Children, Modern Family
- April 19 – Tim Curry, English actor and singer, It, The Wild Thornberrys
- April 23 – Blair Brown, actress, The Days and Nights of Molly Dodd, Fringe
- April 24 – Phil Robertson, American professional hunter (died 2025)
- May 1 – Joanna Lumley, English actress, Absolutely Fabulous
- May 3 – Greg Gumbel, TV sportscaster
- May 7 – Michael Rosen, English children's writer and TV presenter
- May 9 – Candice Bergen, actress, Murphy Brown, Boston Legal
- May 19 – André the Giant, French professional wrestler (died 1993)
- May 20 – Cher, singer and actress, The Sonny & Cher Comedy Hour
- May 28 – Gladys Knight, singer
- May 31 – Maeve Kinkead, soap opera actress
- June 1 – Brian Cox, Scottish actor
- June 14 – Donald Trump, TV host and twice president of the United States
- June 19 – Jennifer Darling, actress, The Six Million Dollar Man, The Bionic Woman
- June 20 – Bob Vila, TV host
- June 23 – Ted Shackelford, actor, Knots Landing
- June 28
  - Gilda Radner, actress and comedian, Saturday Night Live (died 1989)
  - Bruce Davison, actor
- July 6
  - George W. Bush, politician
  - Fred Dryer, actor, Hunter
  - Sylvester Stallone, actor
- July 7 – Joe Spano, actor, Hill Street Blues, NCIS
- July 9
  - Arthur Albert, actor
  - Mary-Ellis Bunim, producer (died 2004)
- July 13 – Cheech Marin, actor and comedian, Nash Bridges
- July 14 – Vincent Pastore, actor, The Sopranos (died 2026)
- July 21 – Mel Damski, director
- July 22 – Danny Glover, actor and director
- July 28 – Linda Kelsey, actress, Lou Grant
- August 5 – Erika Slezak, actress, One Life to Live
- August 10 – James Reynolds, actor, Days of Our Lives
- August 14
  - Antonio Fargas, actor, Starsky & Hutch
  - Susan Saint James, actress, McMillan and Wife, Kate & Allie
  - David Schramm, actor, Wings (died 2020)
- August 16 – Lesley Ann Warren, actress and singer, Mission: Impossible
- August 19 – Bill Clinton, politician
- August 20 – Connie Chung, journalist
- August 26 – Mark Snow, composer
- August 30 – Peggy Lipton, actress, The Mod Squad, Twin Peaks (died 2019)
- September 6 – Loudon Wainwright III, actor
- September 25 – Felicity Kendal, English actress, Rosemary and Thyme
- September 24 – David Anspaugh, director
- September 28 – Jeffrey Jones, actor, Deadwood
- September 29 – Patricia Hodge, English actress, Miranda
- October 3 - Biff Henderson, American comedian
- October 4 – Susan Sarandon, actress
- October 8 – Lynne Adams, actress
- October 10
  - Chris Tarrant, English broadcaster
  - Ben Vereen, actor
- October 11 – Bob Warman, presenter
- October 13 – Demond Wilson, actor, Sanford and Son (died 2026)
- October 14 – Katy Manning, English actress
- October 15 – John Getz, actor
- October 16
  - Suzanne Somers, actress, Three's Company, Step by Step
  - David Greenwalt, screenwriter
- October 18 – Howard Shore, Canadian composer
- October 26 – Pat Sajak, game show host, Wheel of Fortune
- October 27 – Ivan Reitman, screenwriter (died 2022)
- October 31 – Stephen Rea, Irish actor
- November 2 – Richard Newman, Voice actor
- November 4
  - Laura Bush, First Lady of the United States
  - Les Lannom, actor and musician, Harry O
- November 6
  - Sally Field, actress, Gidget, The Flying Nun, Brothers & Sisters
  - Fred Penner, actor and musician, Fred Penner's Place
- November 20 – Judy Woodruff, broadcast journalist
- November 25 – Marc Brown, author and creator of Arthur
- November 28 – Joe Dante, actor
- December 1 – Jonathan Katz, actor
- December 14
  - Patty Duke, actress, The Patty Duke Show (died 2016)
  - Lynne Marie Stewart, actress (died 2025)
- December 16 – Terence Knox, actor, St. Elsewhere, Tour of Duty
- December 17 – Eugene Levy, actor
- December 18 – Steven Spielberg, American director
- December 19 – Robert Urich, actor, Vega$, Spenser for Hire (died 2002)
- December 20 – Dick Wolf, television producer
- December 23 – Susan Lucci, actress, All My Children

== Deaths ==
- June 14 – John Logie Baird, engineer, one of the inventors of the mechanical television, 57
- December 25 – W. C. Fields, US actor and comedian, 66
