= 1946 in American television =

This is a list of American television-related events in 1946.

== Events ==
Date	Event	Ref.
February 4	RCA demonstrates an all-electronic color television system.	
February 18	The First Washington, D.C.-to-New York City telecast through AT&T Corporation's coaxial cable is termed as a success by engineers. This broadcast was images of General Dwight Eisenhower placing a wreath at the base of the statue in the Lincoln Memorial, with others making brief speeches. Time magazine, however, called it 'as blurred as an early Chaplin movie.'	
February 25	The 18-channel VHF allocation, introduced before World War II, is officially ended in favor of a new 13-channel VHF allocation due to the appropriation of some frequencies by the United States Armed Forces, and the relocation of FM radio on the broadcast spectrum. Only five of the old channels are the same as the new channels in terms of frequency and none have the same number as before.	
April 12	The Columbia Broadcasting System transmits a Technicolor short film and color slides for 332 kilometres (206 mi) in distance via coaxial cable, from Manhattan to Washington, and back.	
June 19	The first televised heavyweight boxing title fight between Joe Louis and Billy Conn is broadcast from Yankee Stadium. The fight was seen by 141,000 people, the largest television audience to see a boxing match to that date.	
August 15	The DuMont Television Network officially begins operations as a second television network to compete with NBC. New York City's WABD serves as the network's flagship. DuMont's broadcast schedule consisted of a Western film on Sunday night for an hour, other programming for an hour on Tuesday, and half hours on Wednesday and Thursday nights.	
October 2	The DuMont network telecasts the first-ever television network soap opera, Faraway Hill.	
December 24	WABD broadcasts the first-ever televised church service from Grace Episcopal Church in New York City.	

=== Other notable events ===
- RCA, DuMont, Crosley, and Belmont, have all released the first post-war television sets.
- Zoomar introduces the first professional zoom lens for television cameras.
- The FCC begins to reserve channel 1 for low-powered Community television stations. Channel 1 would be decommissioned from broadcasting use two years later.

== Television stations ==
=== Station launches ===
Date	City of License/Market	Station	Channel	Affiliation	Notes/Ref.
September 6	Chicago, Illinois	WBKB	4 (later 2)	Independent	First television station to be established in the Central Time Zone, and the first station outside the Eastern Time Zone; Now CBS O&O WBBM-TV since 1953

=== Network affiliation changes this year ===
Date	City of license/Market	Station	Channel	Old affiliation	New affiliation	Notes/Ref.
August 15	New York City	WABD	5	Independent	DuMont Television Network	

== Television programs ==
=== Debuts ===
Date	Debut	Network
January	See What You Know	CBS
May 9	Hour Glass	NBC
May 13	You Are an Artist	NBC
May 23	Let's Play Reporter	DuMont Television Network
June 9	Face to Face	NBC
June 9	Geographically Speaking	NBC
June 20	Cash and Carry	DuMont Television Network
August 30	I Love to Eat	NBC
September 24	Play the Game	DuMont Television Network
October 2	Faraway Hill	DuMont Television Network
Unknown	Boxing From Jamaica Arena	DuMont Television Network
