= 1946–47 United States network television schedule =

The 1946–47 United States network television schedule was nominally from September 1946 to March 1947, but scheduling ideas were still being developed and did not conform to modern standards.

This was the first "network television season" in the United States, and only NBC and DuMont operated networks. CBS had one television station, WCBS, which served New York City. Additionally, several other companies—including Mutual, Paramount, and ABC—had plans to enter the medium over the next few years. Although experimental broadcasting had begun in the 1930s and television stations had been commercially licensed beginning in 1941, it was not until 1946 that coaxial cable connections allowed stations to share the same program schedules. Even then, only a few cities on the East Coast were connected.

Notable series on the schedule included the first network TV soap opera, Faraway Hill; the poorly-received but ambitious variety series, Hour Glass; the first network-televised game show, Cash and Carry (prior game shows had been single-station only); and the anthology series Kraft Television Theatre, which ran until 1958.

Few broadcasts made during this season exist in any archive, but segments of Campus Hoopla dating from 1947 exist in the Hubert Chain Collection of the earliest kinescopes still in existence, as preserved in the Library of Congress (Moving Image Collection). Audio recordings of live TV broadcasts of this show are also on file at the Library of Congress from the 1946–47 period, as recorded from WNBT-TV in New York (NBC's original flagship station in New York City, today's WNBC-TV).

New series and those that made their network debuts during the season are highlighted in bold. Series ending are highlighted in italics.

== Legend ==
- Light blue indicates local programming.
- Light green indicates sporting events.
- Light purple indicates movies.

== Sunday ==
Network		7:00 p.m.	7:30 p.m.	8:00 p.m.	8:30 p.m.	9:00 p.m.	9:30 p.m.	10:00 p.m.	10:30 p.m.
NBC	Fall	Local programming		Face to Face (8:00) / **Geographically Speaking** (8:15)	**Broadway Previews** / **NBC Television Theatre**		Local programming		
NBC	Winter	Local programming		Face to Face (8:00) / **Bristol-Myers Tele-Varieties** (8:15)	**Broadway Previews** / **NBC Television Theatre**		Local programming		
NBC	Summer	Local programming		Face to Face (8:00) / **Bristol-Myers Tele-Varieties** (8:15)	Television Screen Magazine	**The Borden Show**	Local programming		

* Beginning in December 1946 on WNBT-TV, and then on January 5, 1947, on the NBC Network, Bristol-Myers Tele-Varieties, hosted by Jinx Falkenburg and Tex McCrary, aired Sundays from 8:15 to 8:30pm ET.

== Monday ==
Network	7:00 p.m.	7:50 p.m.	8:00 p.m.	8:30 p.m.	9:00 p.m.	9:30 p.m.	10:00 p.m.	10:30 p.m.
DMN	Local programming				Boxing from Jamaica Arena			
NBC	Local programming	The Esso Newsreel	Voice of Firestone Televues (8:00) / Short Film Subjects (8:10)	**Boxing from St. Nicholas Arena** (open-ended)				

== Tuesday ==
Network		7:00 p.m.	7:30 p.m.	8:00 p.m.	8:30 p.m.	9:00 p.m.	9:30 p.m.	10:00 p.m.	10:30 p.m.
DMN	Fall	Local programming		**Play the Game**	Selected Film Shorts	**Serving Through Science**	Local programming		
DMN	Spring	Local programming		**Play the Game**	Selected Film Shorts	**Serving Through Science**	Cash and Carry	Local programming	
DMN	Summer	Small Fry Club	**Highway to the Stars**	Western movie		Local programming			

== Wednesday ==
Network		7:00 p.m.	7:30 p.m.	8:00 p.m.	8:30 p.m.	9:00 p.m.	9:30 p.m.	10:00 p.m.	10:30 p.m.
DMN		Local programming		Magic Carpet (travelogue)	Local programming	**Faraway Hill**	Boxing from Jamaica Arena		
NBC	Fall	Local programming							
NBC	Spring	Local programming	**Kraft Television Theatre** (From May 7)		**In the Kelvinator Kitchen** (8:30) (From May 21) / Local programming (8:45)	Local programming			

== Thursday ==
Network		7:00 p.m.	7:30 p.m.	8:00 p.m.	8:30 p.m.	9:00 p.m.	9:30 p.m.	10:00 p.m.	10:30 p.m.
DMN	Fall	Local programming		Vera Massey Show	Film Shorts	Cash and Carry	Local programming		
DMN	Winter	Local programming		Melody Bar Ranch	Film Shorts	Cash and Carry	Local programming		
DMN	Spring	Local programming		Melody Bar Ranch	Film Shorts	Local programming			
DMN	Summer	Local programming	**King Cole's Birthday Party**	Melody Bar Ranch	Film Shorts	Local programming			
NBC		Local programming	In Town Today (7:30) / The Esso Newsreel (7:50)	Hour Glass		Famous Fights (Boxing film highlights)	Local programming		

Note: On DuMont, King Cole's Birthday Party was also known simply as Birthday Party. It debuted on Dumont's New York City station, WABD on May 15, 1947. By early 1948 it was carried on the entire network, but the date it switched from a New York-only to a complete network broadcast is unclear.

== Friday ==
Network		7:00 p.m.	7:30 p.m.	8:00 p.m.	8:30 p.m.	9:00 p.m.	9:30 p.m.	10:00 p.m.	10:30 p.m.
DMN		Local programming		Western movie		Wrestling from Jamaica Arena			
NBC	Fall	Local programming	Television Quarterback (To December 20)	**You Are an Artist** (8:00) / **Let's Rhumba** (8:15)	I Love to Eat (8:30) / The World in Your Home (8:45)	**Boxing from Madison Square Garden** (open-ended)			
NBC	Winter	Local programming	**Campus Hoopla** (From December 27)	You Are an Artist (8:00) / Local programming (8:15)	I Love to Eat (8:30) / The World in Your Home (8:45)	**Boxing from Madison Square Garden** (open-ended)			
NBC	Spring	Local programming	**Campus Hoopla** (From December 27)	You Are an Artist (8:00) / The World in Your Home (8:15)	I Love to Eat	**Boxing from Madison Square Garden** (open-ended)			
NBC	Late spring	Local programming		Campus Hoopla	You Are an Artist (8:30) / The World in Your Home (8:45)	**Boxing from Madison Square Garden** (open-ended)			

== By network ==
Some of the series below are not shown on the schedule as the day and time these aired are not currently known.

=== DuMont ===
**Returning series**

- Boxing from Jamaica Arena
- Cash and Carry
- Magic Carpet
- Melody Bar Ranch
- Vera Massey Show
- Western movie

**New series/network debuts**

- **Doorway to Fame** *
- **Faraway Hill**
- **King Cole's Birthday Party** *
- **Movies for Small Fry** *
- **Play the Game**
- **Serving Through Science**

=== NBC ===
**Returning Series**

- Duffy's Tavern
- The Esso Newsreel
- Face to Face
- Hour Glass
- I Love to Eat
- In Town Today
- NFL Football Magazine
- Television Quarterback
- Voice of Firestone Televues
- The World in Your Home

**New series/Network debuts**

- **The Borden Show** *
- **Boxing from Madison Square Garden**
- **Boxing from St. Nicholas Arena**
- **Bristol-Myers Tele-Varieties** *
- **Broadway Previews**
- **Campus Hoopla** *
- **Geographically Speaking**
- **Hour Glass** *
- **In the Kelvinator Kitchen** *
- **Juvenile Jury** *
- **Kraft Television Theatre** *
- **Let's Rhumba**
- **Musical Merry-Go-Round** *
- **NBC Television Theatre**
- **Television Screen Magazine**
- **You Are an Artist**

Note: The * indicates that the program was introduced in midseason.
