= Alma Kitchell =

American singer (1893–1996)

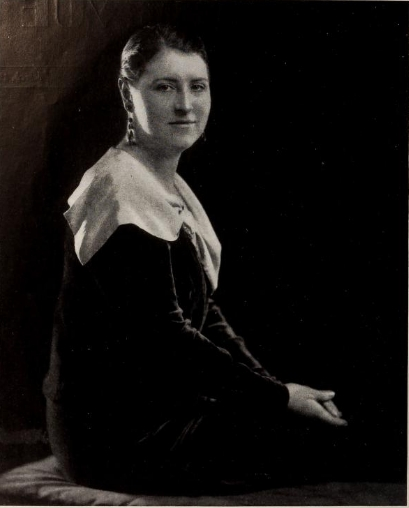
- Alma Kitchell as she was pictured in the March 1930 issue of Radio Revue magazine
- Born: Alma Irene Hopkins; June 29, 1893; Superior, Wisconsin
- Died: November 13, 1996 (aged 103); Sarasota, Florida
- Education: Cincinnati Conservatory of Music
- Spouse(s): Charles Kitchell (1915 - 1956, his death); Joseph Yoder (1965 - 1982, his death)
- Children: 2 sons

Alma Kitchell (June 29, 1893 - November 13, 1996) was an American concert singer who became a pioneer performer in both radio and television.

== Early years ==
Born Alma Irene Hopkins in Superior, Wisconsin, Kitchell planned on a career as a pianist, but instructors at the Cincinnati Conservatory of Music persuaded her to pursue singing instead.

== Concerts ==
Kitchell debuted at New York City's Town Hall in 1924, singing a mixture of classical airs and folk songs.

An article about her in the June 1948 issue of Radio and Television Mirror reported that Kitchell "became a leading concert singer, and appeared as a soloist with important orchestras and choral organizations from coast to coast. She gave recitals at both Carnegie And Town Halls and was highly praised by the New York Critics." Her obituary in The New York Times reported, "In 1937, she turned down an opportunity to join the Metropolitan Opera in order to stay in broadcasting."

== Radio ==
Kitchell's obituary in Variety noted that her "voice was transmitted by the Amateur Radio Corps of America from an experimental station off the New York Harbor in 1917 — before most Americans knew what radio was." She began performing regularly as a singer on radio in 1927, starting a span of two decades that brought her the appellation "Golden Voice of Radio". An item in the March 1930 issue of Radio Revue said, "This charming NBC contralto delights those who tune in on the Sunday Symphonette with her rich renditions of only the best music."

Kitchell joined the staff of WJZ in New York City as a singer and over time became the hostess of programs aimed at women, a transition made possible by "her curiosity, warm enthusiasm for new things, and friendly personality". Her success in that genre led to speaking engagements for clubs at colleges, women's groups, and other organizations.

In 1938, she created her own program, Brief Case, answering questions about radio that listeners had submitted and explaining behind-the-scenes activity. In 1938, she interviewed prominent women on Let's Talk It Over, "one of the original radio talkshows". At that time, she had already made more than 3,000 broadcasts on NBC.

Kitchell began Pin Money Party on NBC-Red on September 30, 1940. The program advised women about "how to earn money on talents developed in the home".

On June 21, 1943, WJZ launched Woman's Exchange, "a clearing house for the interchange of ideas among the housewives of the vast WJZ coverage area ... to help them in their wartime food and household problems." Kitchell was the hostess. Also in the early 1940s, she was host of Meet Your Neighbor on NBC-Blue.

Beginning in 1944, Kitchell had a syndicated program, Come and Get It, which was described as the "first recorded audience participation show". Seventy-eight 15-minute episodes were distributed by NBC Radio-Recording Division. The program was also broadcast in Canada, with distribution by All-Canada Radio Facilities, Limited.

== Television ==
On June 20, 1939, Kitchell performed in the role of Ruth in an NBC production of The Pirates of Penzance, the first operetta presented on television.

Kitchell left radio to become hostess of In the Kelvinator Kitchen, an NBC program that was described as "typical of a 'homemaker' genre on TV in which a housekeeping skill was demonstrated, often using the sponsor's products." Mary Ellen Snodgrass, in her book, Encyclopedia of Kitchen History, cited the program as "the first commercial network series and first televised cooking show on the air." Another cooking program, however, I Love to Eat, was actually the first of its kind, having debuted on NBC on August 30, 1946.

In 1948, Kitchell told an interviewer from Radio and Television Mirror magazine that she valued "The highly personalized relationship between the performer and the viewer," adding, "You are not just heard in people's homes — you are there."

== Non-performing professional activities ==
Beginning in 1945, Kitchell served as president of the Association of Women Directors of the National Association of Broadcasters.

== Personal life ==
In 1915, Alma married her voice teacher, tenor Charles Wallace Kitchell, with whom she had two sons. He died in 1956. Her second husband, from 1965 until his death in 1982, was Joseph D. Yoder Sr., a retired chemical engineer.

== Death ==
On November 13, 1996, Kitchell died at her home in Sarasota, Florida. She was survived by two sons, four grandchildren, and four great-grandchildren.
