= Miller McClintock =

American traffic control expert (1894–1960)

Miller McClintock (June 13, 1894 - January 10, 1960) was an American expert in traffic control who developed the "friction theory" of traffic. He became interested in educational broadcasting and was a member of the board of Encyclopædia Britannica Films. He subsequently presented the early American factual television series Serving Through Science (1945–47) which showed films from Encyclopædia Britannica.

== Early life ==
Miller McClintock was born in Cedar Rapids, Nebraska, on June 13, 1894. He obtained his doctorate in traffic control from Harvard University in 1924.

== Career ==
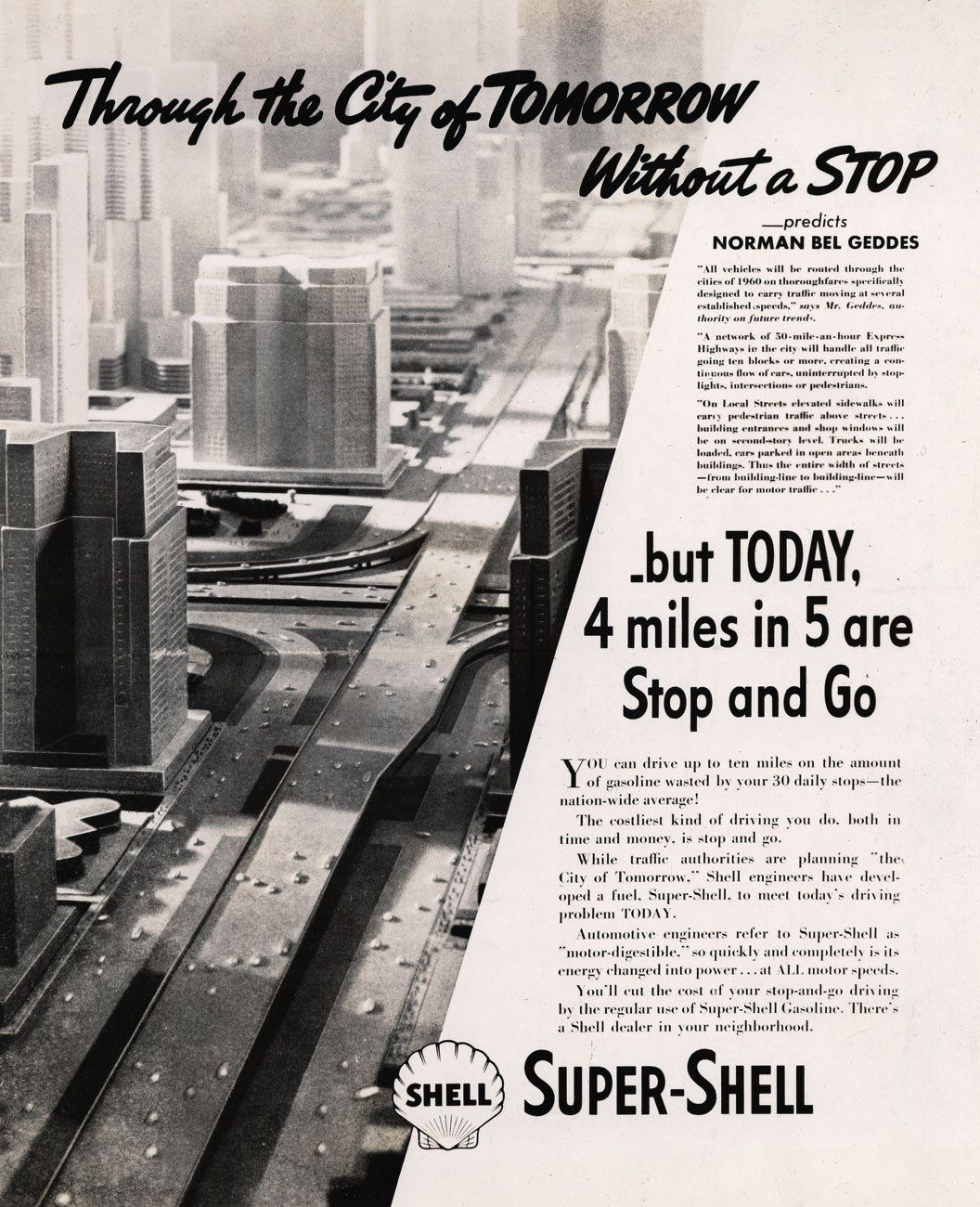
"Through the City of Tomorrow Without a Stop", Shell Oil advertisement, 1937.

McClintock was an expert in traffic control. He was described in Fortune magazine in 1936 as the top man in his field. He was the director of Harvard University's Albert Russel Erskine Bureau for Street Traffic Research which was funded by the Studebaker company and developed a "friction theory" of traffic that combined with the vogue for streamlining in design to propose the segregation of different types of traffic and of traffic from pedestrians to reduce accidents.

McClintock worked with Norman Bel Geddes on traffic planning ideas that found their way into Geddes's advertising campaign for Shell Oil in 1937 known as the Shell Oil City of Tomorrow. In 1937 he addressed the National Planning Conference in Detroit on the subject of motorways.

McClintock became interested in the role that advertising could play in public education and from 1933 to 1942 he worked for the Advertising Research Foundation and the Advertising Council Inc. He was president of the Mutual Broadcasting Company from 1943 to 1944. In accordance with his interest in education through film he became a consultant to and member of the board of Encyclopædia Britannica Films. He presented Serving Through Science on the DuMont Television Network from 1945 to 1947 which featured Britannica films combined with an educational discussion by McClintock.

== Death ==
McClintock died on January 10, 1960.

== Selected publications ==
- Street Traffic Control. McGraw-Hill, New York, 1925.
- A Report on the Street Traffic Control Problem of San Francisco. San Francisco: San Francisco Traffic Survey Committee, 1927.
- A Report on the Street Traffic Control Problem of the City of Boston. City of Boston, Boston, 1928.
- Street Traffic Bibliography: A Selected and Annotated Bibliography of the Literature of Street Traffic Control and Related Subjects, 1920-1933. Harvard University, Cambridge, Mass., 1933.
- Short Count Traffic Surveys and their Application to Highway Design. Portland Cement Association, Chicago, c. 1935.
