= Serving Through Science =

- Created by: Encyclopædia Britannica
- Presented by: Dr. Miller McClintock
- Country of origin: United States

Original release
- Network: DuMont
- Release: May 1945 – May 27, 1947

Serving Through Science is "the first regular science-related network series" and the first educational television series broadcast in the United States.

The series premiered on the DuMont Television Network in May 1945, and was shown Tuesdays at 9 pm ET. The weekly program starred Dr. Miller McClintock showing short films produced by Encyclopædia Britannica, and was sponsored by U. S. Rubber.

The last show aired May 27, 1947.

The series' name was also a slogan used by the sponsor in its advertising.

== See also ==
- List of programs broadcast by the DuMont Television Network
- List of surviving DuMont Television Network broadcasts
- 1946-47 United States network television schedule

== References and sources ==
Sources

- David Weinstein, The Forgotten Network: DuMont and the Birth of American Television (Philadelphia: Temple University Press, 2004) ISBN 1-59213-245-6
- Alex McNeil, Total Television, Fourth edition (New York: Penguin Books, 1980) ISBN 0-14-024916-8
- Tim Brooks and Earle Marsh, The Complete Directory to Prime Time Network TV Shows, Third edition (New York: Ballantine Books, 1964) ISBN 0-345-31864-1
