= In the Kelvinator Kitchen =

- Genre: Cooking
- Presented by: Alma Kitchell
- Announcer: Ray Forrest
- Country of origin: United States
- Original language: English

Production
- Camera setup: Multi-camera
- Running time: 15 minutes

Original release
- Network: NBC
- Release: 21 May 1947 – 30 June 1948

In the Kelvinator Kitchen is an NBC Television Network series which aired from 21 May 1947 to 30 June 1948. The series was a cooking show sponsored by Kelvinator, and the appliances used on the show were from that company.

In her book Encyclopedia of Kitchen History, Mary Ellen Snodgrass cited the program as "the first commercial network series and first televised cooking show on the air." Another cooking program, I Love to Eat, was actually the first of its kind, having debuted on NBC on August 30, 1946.

Alma Kitchell hosted, and Ray Forrest was the announcer on this series. Each episode was 15 minutes long and aired Wednesdays at 8:30pm ET.

The program originated in the studios of WNBT.

A review in the May 17, 1947, issue of the trade publication Billboard called the show "an unpretentious program with sustained commercial impact."

== Episode status ==
No footage of the show is known to survive.

A description of the show appears in the August 30, 1947, issue of The New Yorker magazine. In the article, Robert Rice chronicles one week of TV set owner Harry Dubin's viewing when TV was still a relative novelty, with fewer than 200,000 TV sets in use throughout the country.

== See also ==
- 1947-48 United States network television schedule
