= Bristol-Myers Tele-Varieties =

- Starring: Jinx Falkenburg; Tex McCrary
- Country of origin: United States

Production
- Running time: 15 minutes

Original release
- Network: NBC Television
- Release: January 5 – April 13, 1947

Bristol-Myers Tele-Varieties is a TV series which was initially broadcast locally on New York's WNBT (now WNBC) beginning in December 1946. It then began running on the NBC Television Network on January 5, 1947, on Sunday evenings from 8:15 to 8:30 p.m. Eastern Time. It replaced Geographically Speaking, which had also been sponsored by Bristol-Myers. The show tried different formats during its run, the most successful arguably being when the show was hosted by the wife-and-husband team of Jinx Falkenburg and Tex McCrary beginning in March 1947. This version was an adaptation of their popular Hi Jinx radio program, and included interviews with celebrities. In March 1947 it was moved to 8 to 8:15 p.m. E. T. on Sundays, and it ended on April 13, 1947.

Wes McKee was the producer, and Roger Muir was the director.

== Critical response ==
The review in the trade publication Variety for the show's premiere as a local variety show was highly negative, stating that "Gags are corny to the extreme, continuity is lacking and the commercial is the kind to make viewers squirm in distaste".

The review in Variety upon the introduction of Jinx Falkenburg and Tex McCrary as hosts was much more positive. It complimented the couple's chatter, photogenic qualities, and stage presence. It also praised the integration of the Ipana commercial into the episode and noted the good work of the producer and director.

== See also ==
- 1946-47 United States network television schedule
