= Melanie Kahane =

American interior designer

Melanie Kahane (1910–1988) was an American interior designer and 1985 inductee of the Interior Design Hall of Fame. She was first recognized in the design world as the pioneer of one of the first colored kitchen appliances: a shiny red stove. This move kick-started her reputation as a designer of boldly colored rooms, although she spotted early the possibilities of television for promoting design. Throughout her career she became one of the most notable high-end designers in New York City. She was most influential as a designer from the 1940s to the 1960s, although her career lasted half a century.

== Personal life ==
Melanie Kahane was born in Manhattan in 1910. Shortly after, her family moved to Sioux Falls, South Dakota. This is where the majority of her upbringing took place. She attended high school in Hackettstown, New Jersey. She then attended Parsons School of Design in 1928, where she studied fashion design and illustration. She graduated in 1931. After graduation, she spent a year as an illustrator at an advertising agency, followed by a brief period in Paris and with Lord & Taylor. She married her first husband, Theodore Ebenstein, in 1934. By 1945 she and Ebenstein had one daughter, and divorced shortly thereafter. At this time, she was on her way to transitioning from a fashion illustrator to an interior designer. Her former husband leased her office space to use for her interior design firm. By the early 1950s, another marriage had come and gone, and she met her third husband, Ben Grauer, a prominent radio commentator on NBC. Kahane and Grauer hosted a radio show called Decorating Wavelengths. This show combined design and media commitments in order to inform the public on current news and advice. In this time period, she was called “New York’s most photogenic decorator,” it was also said that “she had a sophisticated design flair and was exceptionally good with the details of a room,” by Wynn Hershey of Mike Bell Antiques.

== Career ==
Melanie Kahane came into the spotlight in 1946 when she designed one of the first colored kitchen appliances: a shiny red stove. In the course of her long career, she designed everything from light bulbs to hotels, theaters, and studio apartments. Her clients admired her for her glamorous designs, as well as for her charming and energetic personality. She produced many of her famous works in the home she shared with Grauer. Besides her work in the United States, she also was on the design team for the 1958 World's Fair in Brussels and did work for NBC in the Soviet Union.

In 1985, she was inducted into the Interior Design Hall of Fame. In her half a century working as an interior designer, she designed for such celebrities as Alan King, Eli Wallach, and John Chancellor. Houses she designed include Billy Rose’s William G. Loew mansion on East Ninety-Third Street, and one for producer Joseph E. Levine, Amon Carter, W. T. Grant and Anne Tandy. Other notable projects include the design of Shubert theaters in Boston, Chicago, and New York, beauty salons throughout the United States for Charles of the Ritz and the headquarters for the First National Bank of Fort Worth. Kahane died of lung cancer in her home in December of 1988. In the same year, Parsons School of Design hosted a dinner in her honor, and established a student scholarship in her name. The school applauded her business acumen and her design abilities. Jeremiah Goodman expressed that, “Melanie was a true professional and was very good about finances, but it wasn’t just business with her. Decorating was a passion.”

== Additional references ==
- "Sunday spent relaxing way: staying in bed," The Globe and Mail, October 25, 1979.
- "Entertainment will fill home, designer says," The Globe and Mail, May 1, 1981.
- Enid Nemy, "New Yorkers, etc." The New York Times, July 20, 1983.
- Bernadine Morris, "Shoppers: Harried but Chic," The New York Times, December 20, 1983.
