= Flora Campbell =

American actress (1911–1978)

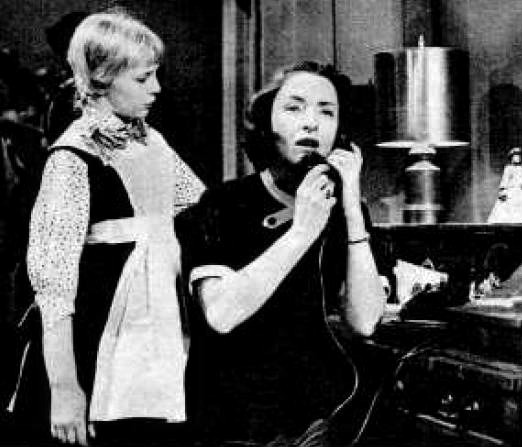
- Bonnie Sawyer (Kim Emerson) and Flora Campbell (Helen Emerson) appear in the TV version of Valiant Lady in 1956.
- Born: August 1, 1911; Nowata, Oklahoma
- Died: November 6, 1978 (aged 67); Stamford, Connecticut
- Education: University of Chicago
- Occupation: Actress
- Spouse: Ben Cutler (m. 1939)
- Father: T. Bernard Campbell

Flora Campbell (August 1, 1911 – November 6, 1978) was an American actress on radio, television, and stage.

== Career ==
Campbell was born in Oklahoma, the daughter of Mr. and Mrs. T. Bernard Campbell. She had a twin sister, Dorothy. She did her collegiate studies at the University of Chicago, studied violin at Chicago's Musical College, and won a scholarship to study acting under Eva Le Gallienne.

In the 1930s, Campbell gained early acting experience in stock theater with the Club Playhouse Group in Maryland. She appeared on Broadway in various roles in the 1930s, 1940s, 1950s and 1960s.

On radio, Campbell played Jean Lambert on Brave Tomorrow and Janice King on The Strange Romance of Evelyn Winters.

On television, Campbell played Karen St. John in Faraway Hill, Helen Emerson on Woman with a Past, Dr. Robin McKay in The Seeking Heart, Dora Foster in A Date with Judy and Helen Emerson on Valiant Lady.

On August 24, 1939, Campbell married Ben Cutler, a band leader from New York. They had two children.

She died on November 6, 1978, in Stamford, Connecticut at age 67.
