= 1941 in television =

The year 1941 in television involved some significant events. Below is a list of television-related events during 1941.

== Events ==
- April 30 – In the United States, the Federal Communications Commission (FCC) approves the National Television System Committee (NTSC) standards of 525 lines and 30 frames per second, and authorizes commercial television broadcasting to begin on July 1.
- May 2 – In the United States, 10 television stations are granted commercial TV licenses (effective July 1). These stations are required to broadcast 15 hours per week. Bulova Watch Co., Sun Oil Co., Lever Bros. Co. and Procter & Gamble sponsor the first commercial telecasts from WNBT (now WNBC-TV) in New York.
- July 1
  - Commercial television is authorized by the FCC.
  - NBC television begins commercial operation by its affiliate WNBT New York using channel 1. The world's first legal television commercial advertisement, for Bulova watches, airs at 2:29 PM on WNBT before a baseball game between the Brooklyn Dodgers and Philadelphia Phillies. An announcement for Bulova watches, for which the company pays anywhere from $4.00 to $9.00 (reports vary), displays a WNBT test pattern modified to look like a clock with the hands showing the time, and the Bulova logo, with the phrase "Bulova Watch Time" shown in the lower right-hand quadrant of the test pattern while the second hand sweeps around the dial for one minute On July 1, Ray Forrest reads the first formal on-camera TV announcement, followed on July 4 by the first live commercial, for Adam Hats.
  - As a one-off special, the first quiz show called "Uncle Bee" is telecast on WNBT's inaugural broadcast day, followed later the same day by Ralph Edwards hosting the second game show broadcast on United States television, Truth or Consequences, as simulcast by radio and TV and sponsored by Ivory soap. Weekly broadcasts of the show commence during 1956, with Bob Barker.
  - CBS television begins commercial operation on New York station WCBW (now WCBS-TV) using channel 2.
- September 1 — WPTZ (now KYW-TV) signs on in Philadelphia, the third television station in America.
- October 21 - Professional wrestling premieres during prime-time on NBC.
- December 7 – Ray Forrest of WNBT broadcasts special news bulletin regarding the Pearl Harbor attack, interrupting regular programming, the film Millionaire Playboy. WNBT later broadcasts special news reports through the evening, pre-empting a scheduled New York Rangers hockey telecast. WCBW also broadcasts a special that evening, from their Grand Central Terminal studios to the few thousand television set owners in the New York area.

== Debuts ==
- July 1 - CBS Television News, debuts on CBS (1941-1943, 1944–Present).
- July 1 - Girl About Town with Joan Edwards debuts on CBS (1941-1942).
- July 1 - Sports with Bob Edge debuts on CBS (1941-1942).
- July 2 - CBS Television Quiz premieres as television's first regular game show (1941–1943). .
- July 2 - Table Talk with Helen Sioussat, the first televised talk show, debuts on CBS (1941-1942).
- July 7 - Men At Work, an early variety show, debuts on CBS (1941-1942).
- July 8 - The Boys in the Back Room, a half-hour series that took a behind-the-scenes look at the WCBW television studios, equipment, and staff, debuts on CBS (1941).
- July 16 - Stars of Tomorrow debuts on NBC (1941-1942).
- July 18 - The Face of the War, an early news show hosted by Sam Cuff, debuts on NBC (1941-1945).
- July 18 - Songs by Harvey Harding debuts on NBC (1941-1942).
- August 27 - Thrills and Chills Everywhere debuts on NBC (1941-1946).
- September 4 - Radio City Matinee debuts on NBC (1941-1942).
- September 18 - Fashion Discoveries in Television debuts on NBC (1941).
- October 18 - Saturday Night Jamboree debuts on NBC (1941).
- October 21 - The Adam Hats Sports Parade: Wrestling at Ridgewood Grove, debuts on NBC (1941–42).
- December 19 - America's Town Meeting of the Air, a simulcast of the NBC Blue Network public affairs discussion program, debuts on NBC (1941–42).
- December 22 - War Backgrounds debuts on CBS (1941–42).

== Television shows ==
Series	Debut	Ended	Network
CBS Television News	July 1, 1941	December 25, 1942	CBS
Girl About Town with Joan Edwards	July 1, 1941	May 1942	CBS
Sports with Bob Edge	July 1, 1941	May 1942	CBS
CBS Television Quiz	July 2, 1941	January 7, 1943	CBS
Table Talk with Helen Sioussat	July 2, 1941	July 31, 1942	CBS
Men At Work	July 7, 1941	May 1942	CBS
The Boys in the Back Room	July 8, 1941	December 1, 1941	CBS
Stars of Tomorrow	July 16, 1941	May 1942	NBC
The Face of the War	July 18, 1941	1945	NBC
Songs by Harvey Harding	July 18, 1941	May 1942	NBC
Thrills and Chills from Everywere	August 27, 1941	June 4, 1946	NBC
Radio City Matinee	September 4, 1941	May 1942	NBC
Fashion Discoveries in Television	September 18, 1941	October 9, 1941	NBC
Saturday Night Jamboree	October 18, 1941	November 22, 1941	NBC
The Adam Hats Sports Parade: Wrestling at Ridgewood Grove	October 21, 1941	May 12, 1942	NBC
America's Town Meeting of the Air	December 19, 1941	February 19, 1942	NBC
War Backgrounds	December 22, 1941	January 19, 1942	CBS

== Programs ending during 1941 ==
Date	Show	Debut
October 9	Fashion Discoveries in Television	September 18, 1941
November 22	Saturday Night Jamboree	October 18, 1941
December 1	The Boys in the Back Room	July 8, 1941

== Births ==
- January 4 – John Bennett Perry, actor
- January 14 – Faye Dunaway, actress
- January 24 – Neil Diamond, actor
- January 30 – Dick Cheney, politician
- January 31 – Jessica Walter, actress (died 2021)
- February 1
  - Joy Philbin, television personality
  - Arnold Shapiro, television writer
- February 3 – Bridget Hanley, actress (died 2021)
- February 5
  - David Selby, actor
  - Stephen J. Cannell, producer (died 2010)
- February 8 – Nick Nolte, actor
- February 10
  - Michael Apted, actor (died 2021)
  - Dick Carlson, journalist
- February 12 – Chas. Floyd Johnson, actor
- February 13 – David Jeremiah, pastor
- February 27 – Charlotte Stewart, actress
- March 4 – Richard Benjamin Harrison, television personality (died 2018)
- March 5 – Sam Nover, television sportscaster (died 2018)
- March 7 – Joanna Frank, television actress
- March 8 – Adrienne Ellis, actress (died 2019)
- March 9 – Trish Van Devere, actress
- March 16 – Chuck Woolery, game show host (died 2024)
- March 20 – Paul Junger Witt, producer (died 2018)
- March 28 – Alf Clausen, composer (died 2025)
- April 3 – Eric Braeden, German-born actor
- April 5 – Michael Moriarty, American-Canadian actor
- April 7 – Cornelia Frances, actress (died 2018)
- April 20 – Ryan O'Neal, actor (died 2023)
- April 28 – Ann-Margret, Swedish-born actress, dancer and singer
- May 4 – George Will, American libertarian-conservative political commentator
- May 13 – Senta Berger, Austrian actress and producer
- May 17 – Grace Zabriskie, actress
- May 18 – Miriam Margolyes, actress
- May 29 – Bob Simon, American television correspondent (died 2015)
- June 2 – Stacy Keach, actor
- June 12 – Marv Albert, American sportscaster
- June 13 – Paul Moyer, American journalist
- June 17 – William Lucking, American actor (died 2021)
- June 21
  - Joe Flaherty, Canadian-American actor and comedian
  - Lyman Ward, Canadian actor
- June 22
  - Michael Lerner, actor (died 2023)
  - Barry Serafin, television journalist
- July 3 – Gloria Allred, attorney
- July 8 – Michael K. Frith, producer
- July 10 – Robert Pine, actor
- July 13 – Robert Forster, actor (died 2019)
- July 22 – George Clinton, funk musician
- July 28 – Peter Cullen, Canadian voice actor (Transformers, Winnie the Pooh, Chip 'n Dale: Rescue Rangers) (died 2026)
- July 29 – David Warner, English actor (Batman: The Animated Series, Freakazoid!, Toonsylvania) (died 2022)
- July 30 – Rod Perry, actor (died 2020)
- August 3 – Martha Stewart, writer
- August 4 – Paul Mooney, comedian, writer and actor (died 2021)
- August 27 – Harrison Page, actor
- September 6 – Edgar Snyder, Pittsburgh-area personal injury lawyer who appeared in commercials
- September 8 – Bernie Sanders, politician
- September 17 – Gary DeVore, screenwriter (died 1997)
- September 18 – Gerry Bamman, actor
- October 4 – Lori Saunders, actress
- October 5 – Stephanie Cole, actress
- October 7 – John Ford Noonan, actor (died 2018)
- October 10 – Peter Coyote, actor
- October 16 – Tim McCarver, baseball player and sportscaster (died 2023)
- October 26 – Charlie Hauck, comedy writer (died 2020)
- October 31 – Sally Kirkland, actress
- November 1 – Robert Foxworth, actor
- November 5 – Tony Guida, radio personality
- November 18 – Ron Powers, American journalist
- November 21
  - Juliet Mills, actress
  - David Porter, musician
  - Dr. John, singer (died 2019)
- November 23 – Franco Nero, actor
- December 4 – David Johnston, Australian newsreader
- December 6
  - Leon Russom, actor
  - Rolland Smith, news anchor
- December 9
  - Beau Bridges, actor
  - César Mascetti, Argentine television host (died 2022)
- December 10 – Fionnula Flanagan, actress
- December 13 – John Davidson, actor, singer and game show host
- December 16 – Lesley Stahl, television journalist
- December 22 – Peter Helm, actor (died 2026)
