= The World in Your Home =

- Genre: Educational
- Country of origin: United States

Production
- Running time: 15 minutes

Original release
- Network: NBC
- Release: December 22, 1944 – 1948

The World in Your Home is an NBC Television series which aired from December 22, 1944, to 1948, originally broadcast on WNBT, NBC's New York flagship, then broadcast on NBC-affiliate stations WRGB, WNBW, and WPTZ in Philadelphia starting shortly after its premiere. It was one of the earliest series on American TV.

== Overview ==
Each episode was 15 minutes long, and is believed to be one of the first television programs in the history of the NBC Television network. The series aired after I Love to Eat with James Beard in 1946, and after Campus Hoopla in 1947.

Knowledge about the program's content is limited. RCA Victor sponsored the series, which combined live shows featuring Victor's recording artists with "Walt Disney films made for the Office of the Coordinator of Inter-American Affairs". The show also used travelogues made by Colonial Film Productions and Small Town, U. S. A. films from Julian Bryan Movies.

The World Is Your Home was broadcast from 8:30 to 8:45 p.m. Eastern Time.

The program was originally scheduled to debut on November 17, 1944. Pre-debut reports said that it would present "a well-rounded program of science, education, entertainment, sports news and special events".

== Episode status ==
It is unclear if any episodes survive, although it seems unlikely as NBC did not have an archival policy at the time.

== Critical response ==
A review of the December 22, 1944, episode in the trade publication Billboard said, "RCA didn't try to do too much in its first sponsored video show, but that which was tried was done almost to perfection."

== See also ==
- 1946-47 United States network television schedule
- 1947-48 United States network television schedule
