= Ben Grauer =

American radio and TV personality (1908–1977)

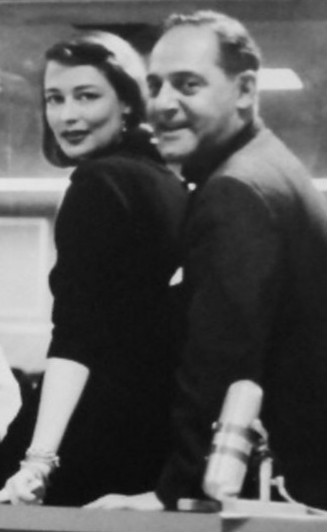
- Tedi Thurman and Ben Grauer at Monitor, 1957.
- Born: Benjamin Franklin Grauer; June 2, 1908; Staten Island, New York, U.S.
- Died: May 31, 1977 (aged 68); New York City, U.S.
- Occupation: broadcaster

Benjamin Franklin Grauer (June 2, 1908 – May 31, 1977) was an American radio and television personality, following a career during the 1920s as a child actor in films and on Broadway. He began his career as a child in David Warfield's production of The Return of Peter Grimm. Among his early credits were roles in films directed by D.W. Griffith.

Grauer started in radio as an actor but soon became part of the broadcasting staff at the National Broadcasting Company. He was one of the four narrators, along with Burgess Meredith, of NBC's public affairs series The Big Story, which focused on courageous journalists.

== Early years ==
Grauer was born Benjamin Franklin Grauer on June 2, 1908, in Staten Island, New York. His parents were Adolph and Ida Grauer. After graduating from Townsend Harris High School, he received his B.A. from the City College of New York in 1930. His name is sometimes seen as Bennett F. Grauer because he gave that name when he was hired by NBC.

== Stage ==
Broadway productions in which Grauer appeared included Penrod (1918), Betty at Bay (1918), The Blue Bird (1923), Processional (1925), and Carnival (1928).

== Radio ==
Grauer's greatest fame lies in his legendary 40-year career in radio. In 1930, the 22-year-old Benjamin Franklin Grauer joined the staff at NBC. He quickly rose through the ranks to become a senior commentator and reporter. He was the designated announcer for the popular 1940s Walter Winchell's Jergens Journal. Perhaps, most importantly, he was selected by Arturo Toscanini to become the voice of the NBC Symphony Orchestra. Grauer took over as announcer in late 1942, and remained until the orchestra was disbanded in June 1954. Toscanini said he was his favorite announcer.

Grauer did both the Toscanini radio and TV broadcasts. Several years after the death of Toscanini, Grauer and composer Don Gillis (who produced the NBC programs from 1947 to 1954), created the Peabody Award-winning radio series Toscanini, the Man Behind the Legend. It began in 1963 and continued through the centennial of Toscanini's birth in 1967. This series ran for nearly two decades on NBC Radio and then other radio stations until the early 1980s.

Starting in 1932, Grauer covered the Olympic Games, presidential inaugurations and international events. During his radio career, Grauer covered nearly every major historic event, including the Morro Castle fire, the Second World War, the Paris Peace Conference and the US occupation of Japan. Millions remember his NBC coverage of the New Year's celebrations on both radio and TV. Starting in 1939, Grauer covered these events for nearly forty years live from New York's Times Square. From the mid-1950s until the early-1970s, Grauer's reports were part of the NBC television network's The Tonight Show, where he worked with Johnny Carson and prior to that, Jack Paar, and Steve Allen. He continued covering New Year's Eve for Guy Lombardo's New Year's Eve specials on CBS in the mid-1970s, with his last appearance on December 31, 1976, the year before both he and Lombardo died. Grauer was also one of NBC Radio's Monitor "Communicators" from 1955 to 1960.

Grauer also was one of five hosts/narrators of "The First Fabulous Fifty", a five-part NBC Radio Network documentary series on the history of the network, featuring soundbites from past NBC programs. The series was broadcast on the occasion of the network's 50th anniversary in the autumn of 1976. Grauer narrated the first installment, which covered the network's first decade on the air, 1926 through 1936.

After retiring from NBC in 1973, Grauer hosted the weekly international radio broadcast "New York, New York with Ben Grauer" on the Voice of America.

== Television ==
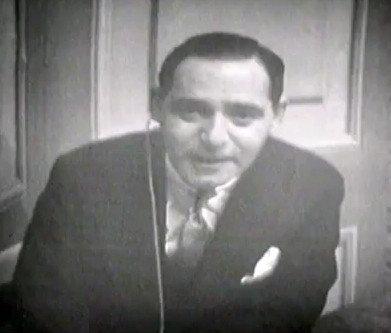
Grauer as the host of WNBT-TV's (later WNBC-TV) tenth anniversary special.

Grauer provided the commentary for NBC's first television special, the opening in 1939 of the New York World's Fair. In 1948, Grauer, working with anchor John Cameron Swayze, provided the first extensive live network TV coverage of the national political conventions.

For five months in 1950, Grauer was host of The Ben Grauer Show, an NBC talk show that focused on books and their authors.

In 1954, NBC began broadcasting some of their shows in color, and in 1957, the animated Peacock logo made its debut. It was Grauer who first spoke the now famous words, "The following program is brought to you in living color on NBC", behind the Peacock graphic. During his 40-year broadcast career, he hosted numerous TV programs on NBC, including game shows, quiz shows, concerts and news programs.

== Reissues ==
It is for announcing the Toscanini radio concerts that Grauer is best known to modern classical music buffs. Several CD reissues have included those announcements to give the listener the feeling of hearing the NBC Symphony broadcasts exactly as they sounded when first aired. However, on the videocassettes and DVD's of Toscanini's television concerts, Grauer's voice has been replaced by that of Martin Bookspan. This was done because the music tracks now heard are not taken from the actual 1948-52 television audio, which was very inferior, but from live, hi-fi magnetic tape sound recordings made of these same concerts at the studio. They are exactly synchronized to the visual images so that it now appears that these programs were made with high-fidelity sound. In order to maintain a complete illusion of superior sound, the announcements had to be redone; the difference in audio quality between Grauer's announcements and the music tracks as they are now heard would have been blatantly obvious.

An archival recording of Grauer's voice calling, "Here it is," begins Harry Shearer's Le Show.

== Final years ==
In the decade before his death, Grauer collected material for a projected history of prices and pricing, with special attention to book prices. He was active in several professional journalistic organizations as well as the Grolier Club. Grauer had a strong interest in the graphic arts; he even printed his own Christmas cards.

== Personal life and death ==
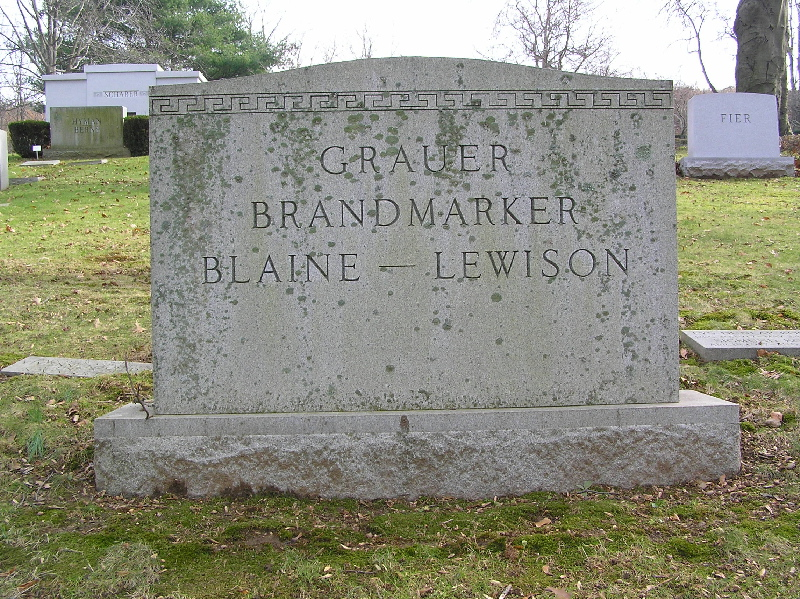
The headstone of Ben Grauer in Westchester Hills Cemetery

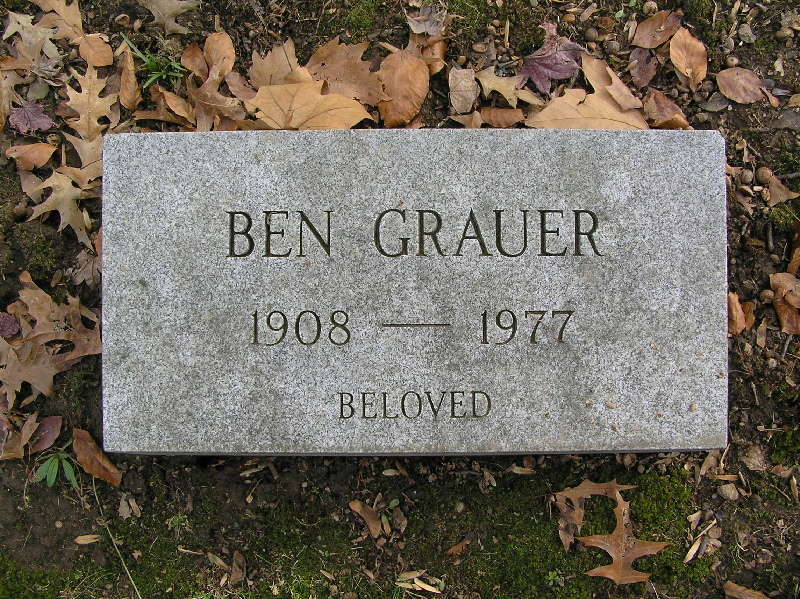
The grave marker of Ben Grauer

On September 25, 1954, Grauer married interior designer Melanie Kahane. He died of a heart attack at New York University Medical Center in New York City on May 31, 1977, two days before his 69th birthday. He is interred in Westchester Hills Cemetery in Hastings-on-Hudson, New York.

== Honors ==
In 1956 Grauer was made a Chevalier of the French Legion of Honour in recognition of his reporting about France and French people. Grauer narrated Two Hundred Years Ago Tonight: The Battle of Lexington, a Voice of America series that won a Peabody Award in 1975.

== Filmography ==
Including early career as child actor:

- His Woman (1919)
- Mad Woman (1919)
- The Idol Dancer (1920) .... as Native Boy (film directed by D.W. Griffith)
- Annabel Lee (1921) .... David Martin, as a child
- The Town That Forgot God (1922) .... as a boy
- My Friend the Devil (1922) .... George Dryden, as a boy
- Does It Pay? (1923)
- Gaslight Follies (1945) .... Narrator, 'Stars of Yesterday'
- Fight of the Wild Stallions (1947) .... Narrator
- Type Speaks! (1947) .... Narrator & Himself (industrial film made for American Type Founders Company
- Kon-Tiki (1950) (voice) .... Narrator

== Radio credits ==
- The Coca-Cola Top-Notchers (1930)
- Thrills Of Tomorrow For Boys (1933)
- The Baker's Broadcast (1934)
- The Fleischmann's Yeast Hour (1934)
- Radio City Matinee (1935)
- The Nellie Revell Show (1935)
- Ripley's Believe It Or Not (1935)
- Circus Night In Silvertown (1935)
- Lux Radio Theatre (1935)
- The Magic Key of RCA (1935)
- Paul Whiteman's Musical Varieties (1936)
- The Shell Show (1937)
- Shell Chateau (1937)
- The Fact Finder (1937)
- The Royal Desserts Program (1938)
- Walter Winchell (1938)
- Pulitzer Prize Plays (1938)
- Battle of the Sexes (1938) NBC quiz.
- Pot o' Gold (1939–41) Considered the first "interactive" broadcast program.
  A popular game show hosted by Grauer.
  Horace Heidt and his Musical Knights played while Grauer asked listeners questions on the phone.
  It was this program that introduced the catchphrase "Stop the music".
- Richard Himber and His Orchestra (1939)
- The Vitalis Program (1939)
- H.V. Kaltenborn (1940)
- News Roundup (1940)
- Behind the Mike (1940)
- The News From Europe (1941)
- Sunday Evening News Roundup (1941)
- NBC Sunday News Roundup (1941)
- Jergens Journal (1941)
- The Hemisphere Review (1941)
- Two Years Of War (1941)
- Kay Kyser's Kollege of Musical Knowledge (1941)
- The March Of Time (1941)
- Radio City Music Hall On the Air (1942)
- Music Of the New World (1943)
- Mr. and Mrs. North (1943)
- Information, Please! (1943) NBC quiz show
- The Fitch Bandwagon (1943)
- Your Home Front Reporter (1943)
- General Motors Symphony Of the Air (1943)
- Treasury Salute (1944)
- Opening Of the Fourth War Loan (1944)
- NBC D-Day Coverage (1944)
- Republican National Convention (1944)
- Democratic National Convention (1944)
- We Came This Way (1944)
- Liberation (1944)
- The Harold Lloyd Comedy Theatre (1945)
- V-E Day Coverage (1945)
- Atlantic Spotlight (1945) Grauer would chat across the Atlantic Ocean with BBC announcer in London.
- The Charlie McCarthy Show (1945)
- It's Alec Templeton Time (1946)
- A Story For V-J Day (1946)
- Echoes Of A Century (1947)
- Home Is What You Make It (1947)
- Here's To Veterans (1947)
- Housing 1947 (1947)
- The Chesterfield Supper Club (1948)
- Living 1948 (1948)
- Author Meets the Critics (1948)
- March Of Dimes (1949)
- The Henry Morgan Show (1949)
- Could Be (1949)
- The People Act (1950)
- We Can Do It (1950)
- The Phil Harris-Alice Faye Show (1950)
- Memo For Americans (1951)
- The Big Show (1951)
- Theatre Guild On the Air (1951)
- Living 1951 (1951)
- American Portraits (1951)
- The Endless Frontier (1952)
- The Forty Million (1952)
- Medicine U.S.A. (1953)
- Biography In Sound (1955)
- Best Of All (1955)
- Monitor (1955–1960) NBC Radio weekend radio show
- X Minus One (1956)
- Recollections At Thirty (1956)
- Sleep No More (1956–57) NBC Radio drama
- The Boston Pops (1957)
- Johnny Presents (1959)
- Meet the Press (1959)
- Democracy In America (1962)
- New Year's Eve All-Star Parade Of Bands (1968)
- The First Fabulous 50 (1976)
- What Would You Have Done? NBC Radio drama

These are found at Digital Deli Too.

== TV credits ==
- Americana (1947–1949) American History quiz show. NBC-TV
- The Ben Grauer Show, You Are an Artist, Learn to Draw (1950)
- The Big Story (1949–57) dramatic TV anthology. NBC-TV
- Eyewitness (1947–48) Series that traced the history and development of TV itself. NBC-TV
- In Town Today (1951) RCA variety specials included Bob Hope and other stars showing off their new TV sets. NBC-TV
- It's a Problem (1951–52) A trio of experts discuss everyday living difficulties. NBC-TV
- Kay Kyser's Kollege of Musical Knowledge (1949–50) Popular musical quiz show hosted by Grauer. NBC-TV
- Lewisohn Stadium Concerts (1950) Featuring the New York Philharmonic. NBC-TV
- March of Medicine (1958) Medical documentary series. NBC-TV
- The Sacco-Vanzetti Story (1960) TV miniseries narrated by Grauer.
- Say It with Acting (1949–1952) Teams from Broadway shows play charades.
- Tactic (1959) NBC-TV series. Guests included Alfred Hitchcock and William Shatner.
- What Happened (1952) Panelists had to find out why each guest was important on this NBC-TV series.

== Listen to ==
- Ben Grauer announces for Arturo Toscanini and the NBC Symphony. Listen to this complete and historic WWII broadcast and view a photo of Ben Grauer

== Bibliography ==
- Holmstrom, John. The Moving Picture Boy: An International Encyclopedia from 1895 to 1995, Norwich, Michael Russell, 1996, p. 35.
