= DuMont Building =

Office skyscraper in Manhattan, New York

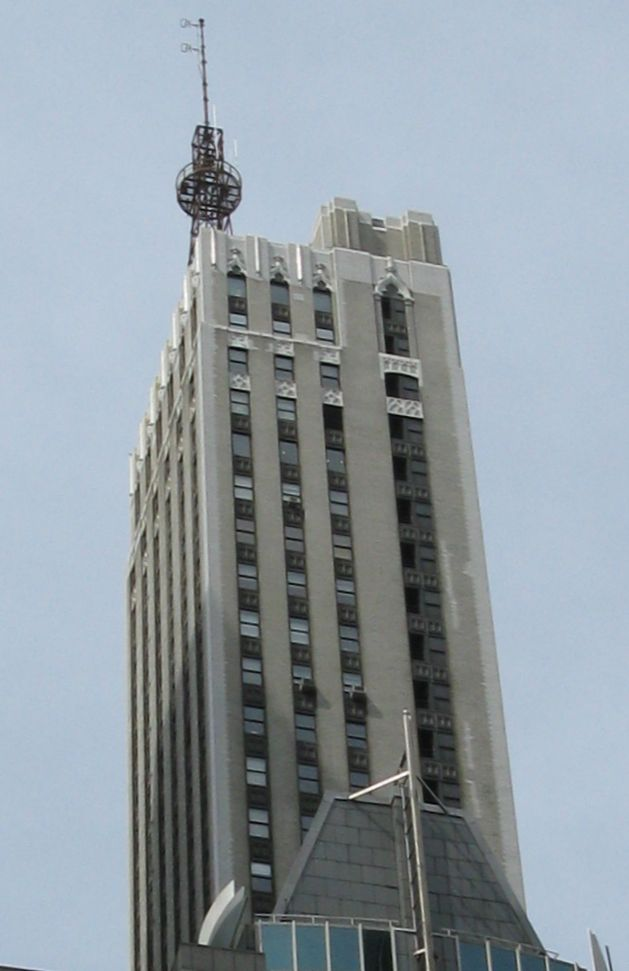
- Interactive map of the DuMont Building area

General information
- Type: Office
- Architectural style: Art Deco, Gothic Revival
- Location: 515 Madison Avenue, Manhattan, New York
- Coordinates: 40°45′36″N 73°58′26″W
- Completed: 1931
- Owner: Newmark & Co.
- Operator: Newmark & Co.

Height
- Top floor: 162 m (531 ft)

Technical details
- Floor count: 42
- Floor area: 250,000 sq ft (23,000 m^{2})

Design and construction
- Architect: J.E.R. Carpenter
- Developer: John H. Carpenter

The DuMont Building (also known as 515 Madison Avenue) is a 532-foot (162 m) high, 42-story building located at 53rd Street and Madison Avenue in Midtown Manhattan, New York City, United States.

The building was built in art deco and neo-Gothic style by John H. Carpenter and designed by his brother, architect J.E.R. Carpenter who also designed Lincoln Tower as well as nearly 125 buildings along Fifth Avenue and Park Avenue.

== Broadcasting antenna ==
One of the building's most distinctive features is a broadcasting antenna that traces back to the building's role in the first television broadcasts of Allen B. DuMont's experimental television station W2XWV in 1938. The station became commercially licensed as WABD—named for DuMont's initials—in 1944, WNEW-TV in 1958, which is now WNYW. The station was one of the few television channels that continued to broadcast through World War II.

After the war, the network and WABD moved to bigger studios - first at the Wanamaker's store at Ninth Street and Broadway in Greenwich Village, then the Adelphi Theatre, the Ambassador Theatre, and in 1954 to the Central Turn-Verein Opera House at 205 East 67th, which was renamed The DuMont Tele-Centre and today is the Fox Television Center, home of WABD's descendant, WNYW.

In June 1951, the WABD antenna was moved to the top of the Empire State Building, consolidating all New York television stations at one location.

In 1958, WKCR-FM, the radio station of Columbia University, began transmitting from the former WABD tower on the roof of the building, remaining there until 1977, when it became the first radio (or television) station to transmit from the antenna atop the World Trade Center, the move necessitated by the construction of other surrounding skyscrapers which started interfering with the station's signal. When the twin towers were destroyed in 2001, WKCR moved its transmission facilities first to the Columbia University campus, and later to 4 Times Square.

== Other events ==
In 1947, the building, which housed the Spanish consulate, was the site of a protest by 700 picketers protesting against the government of Francisco Franco and demanding that the United States end diplomatic relations with Spain.

In 1962, the 250,000-square-foot (23,000 m^{2}) building was sold to Newmark & Co., which still owns and manages it.
