= Ray Forrest =

American sports announcer

Raymond Forrest (born Raymond Feuerstein; January 7, 1916 – March 11, 1999) was a radio staff announcer for NBC. He was a pioneering American TV announcer, host and news broadcaster from the very earliest days of TV pre-World War II through to the 1960s. His obituary in The New York Times called him "the nation's first television personality".

== Early life and career ==
Forrest was the son of Arthur Feuerstein and Hedwig Schneider Feuerstein. He was born in Germany, the son of a watch maker, who emigrated to the United States with his family in 1923. He attended Staunton Military Academy, where he was made cadet major in his senior year. Following his schooling he went abroad for a year to study foreign languages, then returned to the U.S., where he planned to take up his father's trade until a friend of the family who was associated with radio broadcasting invited him to visit Radio City. His career in broadcasting began at 20 with a job as a page boy for NBC in 1936. The job led to his changing his name, as people were confused about the pronunciation of his birth name.

World War II interrupted both the development of television and his own career, though the televised weekly show, “The War As It Happens," debuted in New York City on February 21, 1944. Produced by NBC, the show followed a newsreel format with several minutes of government film about the war effort, interspersed with Forrest in the studio explaining the latest developments with the use of maps on an easel. By April 1944 the broadcast was being fed to Philadelphia and Schenectady, NY, becoming the first newscast to be seen in multiple cities.

Forrest joined the Army in 1942, serving in the ETO. He returned to work at NBC after he returned to civilian life in 1946.

=== 1947-1949 ===
He was almost as busy as ever, among other things as the announcer for In the Kelvinator Kitchen, an early cooking show, in 1947, and as the announcer and eventually the host of Television Screen Magazine, one of the first television magazine shows, in 1948 and 1949.

Then he was asked to produce and to be the host of Children's Theater, and Forrest made what he regarded as his most important contribution to television.

=== 1949-1950 ===
After his father died in 1949, Forrest returned to Paterson, New Jersey, to work with his mother and two sisters in Feuerstein Import Company, which his father had started in 1923. Forrest worked in the business Monday through Friday, reserving Saturdays for his television program.

== Children's Theater ==
Forrest produced and hosted New York City's earliest and one of the most distinctive children's TV variety series called Children's Theater, which was seen on Saturday mornings on New York's WNBT/WRCA TV Channel 4 (even before it became WNBC) from 1949 to June 1961. A veteran radio broadcaster, Forrest created a TV series that encouraged children to explore many places of interest, to read books, and showed them how to care for animals and become involved in local activities. The program debuted on WNBT on September 21, 1949, as "a weekly series of silent movie comedies and cartoons".

"Children's Theater" shared the 1957 NYC Emmy award for "Best Children's And Teenage Program" with WCBS TV's "On The Carousel!". (Info about "Children's Theater" sharing the 1957 NYC Emmy with "On The Carousel" can be found in "The NYC Kids Shows Round Up" section of "The TV Party" website at www.tvparty.com).

During its long run, Children's Theater also showed the 1958 color versions of Crusader Rabbit TV cartoons. Children's Theater remained on WNBC-TV Channel 4's Saturday morning line-up until Saturday, June 17, 1961.

If Forrest is better remembered among older New York television viewers for the acclaimed educational program Children's Theater, which he produced and hosted for WNBC-TV from 1949 to 1960, there is a reason his earlier work has been virtually forgotten.

== Style ==
In the earliest days, wearing a tuxedo to intone the formal sign-on when WNBT went on the air each evening, Forrest announced every station break and every program. He covered wrestling, boxing, ice hockey, horse racing and movie premieres. He interviewed men and women on the street, introduced dramatic productions, was a quiz show announcer and variety show host and even became the network's first full-time news presenter after Lowell Thomas, whose radio news had been simulcast on television, decided to do his broadcasts from his upstate home.

In those pre-World War II days, he became the most visible presence on television, when there were fewer than 5,000 television sets in America, mostly concentrated in the New York City vicinity.

== Nature films ==
Forrest wrote, produced and narrated his own nature films as well. Often he shot his shows on location (using primitive videotape technology), as early as September 24, 1960.

Other notable location broadcasts with Forrest included a series of pre-taped shows from the now defunct Freedomland U.S.A. amusement park in the Bronx. It gave his young viewers a chance to not only see the park but to experience vividly events that were a part of America's history.

== Personal life and death ==
Forrest was married and had a son. A resident of Kinnelon, New Jersey, Forrest died on March 11, 1999, aged 83.
