= Paging You =

- Genre: Comedy
- Written by: Bob Probst; Peter Dion Titheradge
- Country of origin: United Kingdom

Production
- Executive producer: Walton Anderson

Original release
- Network: BBC Television Service
- Release: 3 November 1946 – 1948

Paging You is a BBC comedy series which debuted on 3 November 1946 and was subsequently cancelled in 1948.

== Cast ==
- Bill Fraser (1948)
- Richard Hearne (1947–1948)
- Bobby Howes (1948)
- Claude Hulbert (1948)
- Humphrey Lestocq (1947)
- Brian Reece (1946–1947)
- Phyllis Robins (1946)
- Enid Trevor (1948)
