= You Be the Judge =

You Be the Judge is a United States television game show, which aired on New York City television WCBW beginning January 4, 1946. It is notable as an early example of television programming, though it was not a network series. In each episode, a real-life court case would be re-enacted, and three "amateur judges" (contestants) would make their decisions on the case. The "judge" who came closest the actual verdict would win a prize.

== Personnel ==
Ed Stasheff wrote for the program and was its master of ceremonies, and John Southwell and Phil Booth were the directors.

== Reception ==
A review of the show's first episode in the trade publication Billboard provided a positive outlook: " if its first showing is any criterion, [it] is a program headed for a long, successful and honorable life on television". The reviewer felt, however, that the program would be improved if viewers were allowed to register their decisions in cases via telephone. A subsequent review in Billboard, after the program had been on almost seven months, described it as "still a sock show, with real mental action and plenty of suspense". It noted that viewers at home had been "brought in only casually" and praised the camera work that "brought the performers right into the home".

== Episode status ==
Methods to record live television did not exist during the run of the series. As such, the series is likely lost today except possibly for still photographs.
