= Television Screen Magazine =

- Genre: Talk show
- Starring: Bob Haymes; John McCaffery; Millicent Fenwick; Ray Forrest; Alan Scott; George F. Putnam
- Country of origin: United States
- Original language: English

Production
- Camera setup: Multi-camera
- Running time: 30 minutes

Original release
- Network: NBC
- Release: 17 November 1946 – 13 July 1949

Television Screen Magazine, also known as TV Screen Magazine, is an NBC Television Network series which debuted 17 November 1946, airing Sundays at 8:30 p.m. ET, and ended on July 23, 1949.

== Participants ==
Hosts and panelists included Bob Haymes, John McCaffery, Millicent Fenwick, Ray Forrest, Alan Scott, and George F. Putnam.

== Format ==
Described as "an early version of 60 Minutes", the program featured a magazine-type format with various subjects and guests. The Police Athletic League Chorus was featured on the first episode, and "Walter Law and his stamp collection was an early favorite." Some episodes of the show served as "a showcase for new talent".

== Episode status ==
While it is unclear if any episodes survive of this series, it is certain that none of the 1946 episodes survive, as NBC did not start kinescoping its programs until 1947, and even then only a few series were recorded.

An audio recording of the live TV broadcast of September 14, 1948 from WNBT-TV in New York City is listed as archived in the SONIC Catalogue of Library of Congress. The audio recording features a news recap, followed by interviews with an Irish beauty queen and a horseback rider, among others.

== See also ==
- 1946-47 United States network television schedule
