= Saturday Revue =

American television program

Saturday Revue is an early United States television series which aired on WCBW from 1946 to 1947. It was a variety series, broadcast at 8:00 p.m. on Saturdays. Each episode was 30 minutes in length. As methods to record live television were not available until late 1947, none of the episodes still exist.

== Reception ==
Reviewing the first episode, Billboard magazine panned the broadcast, saying that "Belanger is a good director, and has done some fine work, as evidenced by his winning one of the TBA awards recently, but he missed the boat completely in this production. Show needs a lot of working over before viewers will stay home on Saturday nights to see what is supposed to be a good revue."
