= Geographically Speaking =

- Genre: Travel
- Presented by: Zetta Wells
- Country of origin: United States
- Original language: English
- No. of seasons: 1

Production
- Running time: 15 minutes

Original release
- Network: NBC
- Release: June 9, 1946 – December 1946

Geographically Speaking is an American travel series that debuted on June 9, 1946, on NBC, and aired Sundays at 8:15 pm EST immediately following the game show Face to Face.

Originating at WNBT in New York City, the weekly 15-minute program was one of the first TV shows to have a regular sponsor, Bristol-Myers. The show consisted of hostess Zetta Wells narrating her home movies of her trips with her husband Carveth Wells to unusual and exotic places. When she ran out of home movies, the series ended in December 1946. The sponsor retained the time slot, replacing the show with Bristol-Myers Tele-Varieties.

== Episode status ==
No episode of the series is known to survive in any archive, as it was broadcast live and there was no way to record live TV until the development of kinescopes in 1947. Even then, only a few TV shows were recorded.

== See also ==
- 1946-47 United States network television schedule
