= Cash and Carry (game show) =

1946–1947 American television game show

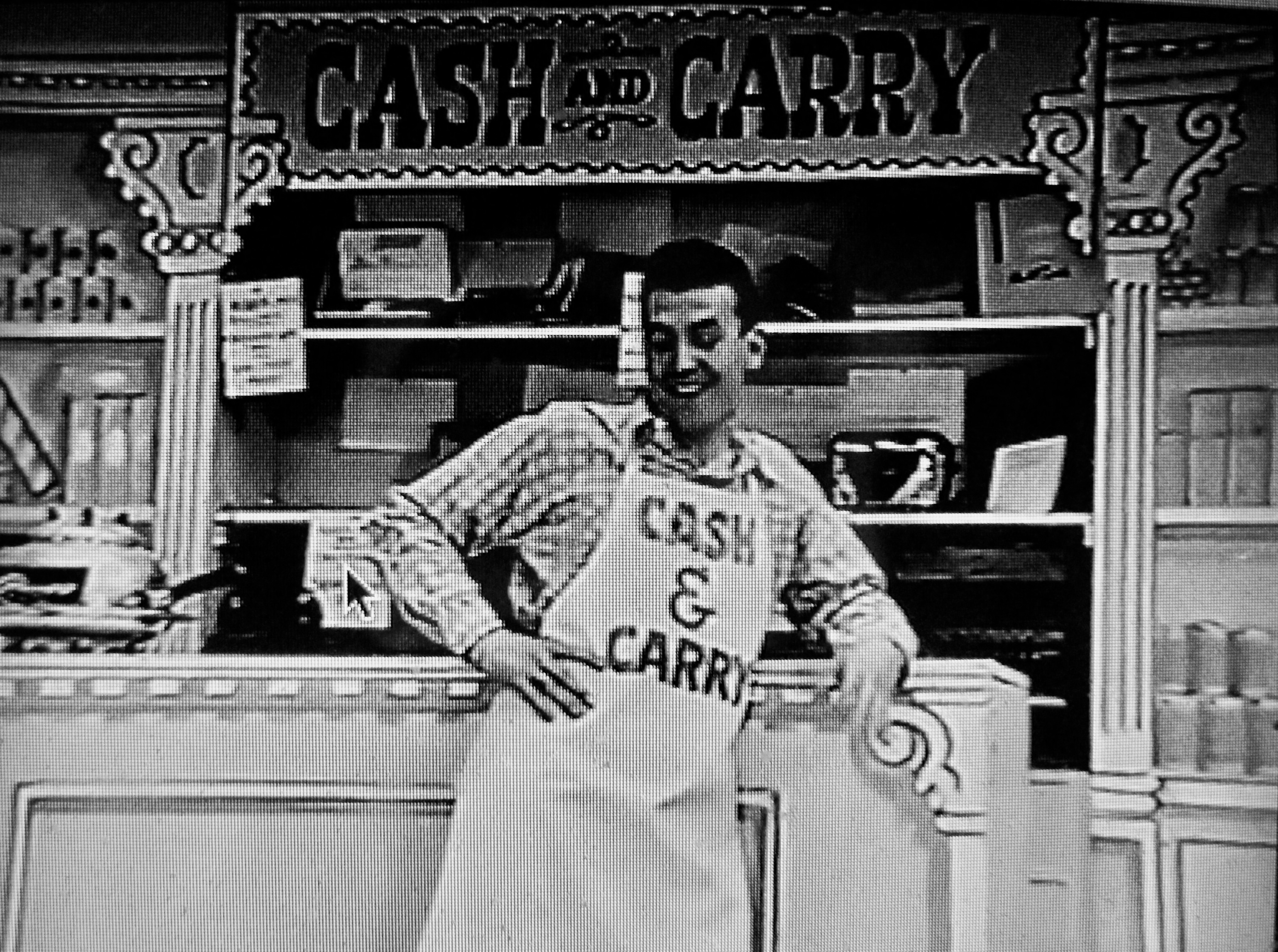
- Publicity shot
- Genre: Game show
- Created by: Art Stark
- Presented by: Dennis James
- Country of origin: United States

Production
- Running time: 24-26 minutes
- Production company: Carr-Stark Productions

Original release
- Network: DuMont
- Release: June 20, 1946 – July 1, 1947

Cash and Carry is an American television game show hosted by Dennis James that ran on the then-both affiliates of the DuMont Television Network from June 20, 1946, to July 1, 1947. This made it not only the sole program aired on Thursday nights by the network (although it moved to Tuesday nights in April), but also the first "network" television game show (all previous television games and quizzes were aired on only one station).

A July 6, 1947 newspaper TV listing showed the show was broadcast on WABD on Tuesdays at 7:30 p.m., immediately following DuMont's popular Small Fry Club.

This series was sponsored by Libby's Foods, and produced by Art Stark, later producer of The Tonight Show Starring Johnny Carson from 1962 to 1969. The show was set in a grocery store, with contestants taking cans, which had questions for them to answer, off the shelves.

== Format ==
In his book, The Forgotten Network: DuMont and the Birth of American Television, David Weinstein described Cash and Carry as an "early television adaptation of Truth or Consequences". James asked contestants questions attached to cans of the sponsor's products, with correct answers worth $5, $10, or $15. Other tasks were stunts, such as a husband and wife having to work together for a common goal (such as the wife, blindfolded, having to feed her husband).

Home viewers could call in during the show to guess what was hidden under a barrel.

== Episode status ==
No episodes are known to exist, as almost all television broadcasts from the first year of United States network television are lost due to a lack of means to preserve such content. The known exceptions are a few episodes of Kraft Television Theatre from early 1947 which were made to test the kinescope process which allowed television series to be preserved.

Even after the kinescope process was created, many shows were still not regularly preserved until the late 1960s.

== See also ==
- List of programs broadcast by the DuMont Television Network
- List of surviving DuMont Television Network broadcasts
- 1946-47 United States network television schedule

== Bibliography ==
- David Weinstein, The Forgotten Network: DuMont and the Birth of American Television (Philadelphia: Temple University Press, 2004) ISBN 1-59213-245-6
- Alex McNeil, Total Television, Fourth edition (New York: Penguin Books, 1980) ISBN 0-14-024916-8
- Tim Brooks and Earle Marsh, The Complete Directory to Prime Time Network TV Shows, Third edition (New York: Ballantine Books, 1964) ISBN 0-345-31864-1
