= You Are an Artist =

- Also known as: The Warren Hull Show; The Ben Grauer Show
- Genre: Talk
- Presented by: Jon Gnagy; Ben Grauer (Feb-June 1950); Warren Hull (Jan-Feb 1950)
- Country of origin: United States
- Original language: English
- No. of seasons: 1

Production
- Running time: 15 mins./20 mins.

Original release
- Network: NBC
- Release: November 1, 1946 – 1950

You Are an Artist is a television series, which first aired on NBC flagship station WNBT-TV in New York City and "a small network of stations on the East Coast" on November 1, 1946, and then continued on the NBC Television network until 1950

Gulf Oil began sponsoring You Are an Artist in December 1946. In February 1950 the show moved to CBS, originating from WCBS-TV. It was sponsored by Doubleday.

== Versions ==
=== You Are an Artist ===
The program was designed to teach people how to draw. Artist Jon Gnagy would create drawings, describing his methods in lay terms. In later episodes, he added analysis of a famous painting on each episode.

The program briefly reverted to a New York City local show before a final three-week run on NBC in 1950.

=== The Warren Hull Show ===
Warren Hull became host of the program in January 1950, and the title changed to reflect his role as star. The format changed to a talk show, focused on the output of show sponsors, book publishers Doubleday and Company. In each episode, Hull talked about a new book from Doubleday and interviewed the author. Hull was host for a month, before Ben Grauer replaced him.

=== The Ben Grauer Show ===
Once more, the title was changed to indicate a new host. Grauer continued Hull's format of talking about books and interviewing authors. His program also plugged Doubleday book clubs that offered discounted versions of books. Grauer's version of the show ran from February 1950 through June 1950.

== See also ==
- 1946-47 United States network television schedule (Fridays at 8:15pm ET, 15 minutes)
- 1947-48 United States network television schedule (Thursdays at 9pm ET, 15 minutes)
- 1948-49 United States network television schedule (Wednesdays at 7:30pm ET, 20 minutes)
