= Face to Face (game show) =

- Genre: Game show
- Presented by: Eddie Dunn
- Starring: Bob Dunn
- Country of origin: United States
- Original language: English

Production
- Running time: 15 minutes

Original release
- Network: NBC
- Release: June 9, 1946 – January 26, 1947

Face to Face is an American television game show. It began broadcasting on the NBC Television network on June 9, 1946, and ran until January 26, 1947, on Sundays at 8:00 pm EST, immediately before Geographically Speaking.

== Overview ==
The concept of the show was for a cartoonist to make a drawing of a person whom he had never seen, based on a description given by other people. Originally, the unseen person was in another room. Later in the show, the person was moved onto the stage, separated from the artist by a curtain. This allowed the audience to see the person's face as the drawing took shape.

There were also quiz questions, in which participants had to identify people based on clues.

The show featured Eddie Dunn as the interviewer and Bob Dunn as the cartoonist. During the show's run, a woman only identified as "Sugar" joined the cast as "a kind of emcee".

Originating at WNBT-TV in New York City, Face to Face was sponsored by Standard Brands.

== See also ==
- 1946-47 United States network television schedule
