= Hour Glass (TV series) =

- Genre: Variety
- Directed by: Ed Sobol
- Presented by: Eddie Mayehoff; Helen Parrish
- Country of origin: United States
- Original language: English

Production
- Running time: 60 minutes

Original release
- Network: NBC
- Release: May 9, 1946 – March 1947

Hour Glass is the first regularly scheduled variety show shown on American network television. The Encyclopedia of Television noted that the program "is historically important because it exemplified the issues faced by networks, sponsors, and advertising agencies in television's formative years."

== Distribution ==
Hour Glass was broadcast only on WNBT (now WNBC) in New York City from May 9, 1946, through November of that year, when distribution to NBC affiliates in Philadelphia and Schenectady began. From that time, the three-city network continued until March 1947.

== Overview ==
Described as "the first [television] hour-long musical variety show", Hour Glass was sponsored by Standard Brands, promoting Chase and Sanborn coffee and Tenderleaf Tea. The program included comedians, musicians, entertaining films (such as a film of dance in South America), and a long, live commercial for the sponsor's products.

Such famous names as Doodles Weaver, Bert Lahr, Dennis Day, Anton Reiter, Jerry Colonna, Peggy Lee and Joe Besser appeared on the program. The first show was hosted by Evelyn Eaton (daughter of one of The Seven Little Eatons); Life surmised that NBC was adapting to a paradigm shift and making better use of the visual medium by hiring an attractive woman as master of ceremonies, as opposed to the more authoritative voices of men who typically commanded radio variety shows of the era.

On November 14, 1946, Edgar Bergen brought his ventriloquism act to the show. It was one of the first times that a major radio performer had appeared on television. Coincidentally, Standard Brands (via Chase and Sanborn) was the sponsor of Bergen's radio program.

== Duration ==
The Columbia History of American Television attributed the program's short life to its cost and the lack of market penetration for television at the time, saying, "Standard Brands invested $200,000 in this series over its ten-month tenure at a time when that level of investment just couldn't be supported and sustained, leading to the Hour Glass's abbreviated run." Another factor was that James Petrillo, president of the American Federation of Musicians forbade musicians from performing on television without an agreement between the AFM and the networks, thus limiting directors and performers to use of recorded music and lip sync. A report in Life at the show's start noted that the show's audience at the time was estimated at 3,500 television sets watched by up to 20,000 viewers, a thousandth of the estimated 20,000,000 radio listeners nationwide that were hearing The Chase and Sanborn Hour in a given week.

== Personnel ==
The show was co-hosted by Eddie Mayehoff and Helen Parrish. Edgar Bergen later became the host of the program. Edward Sobol was the producer. During the series' time on the air, a system of alternating writers was developed, giving "an individual writer two weeks in which to write a show instead of the weekly deadline."

== Critical reception ==
A contemporary review in Life praised the individual performances but panned the production values, noting that camera operators cut off the feet of dancers and that the show lacked the kind of "camera virtuosity monopolized by Hollywood." On the whole, the Life review noted that television would need "good scripts and better directors" if it were to succeed.

== Existing recordings ==
Audio-only recordings of Hour Glass from 1946–1947, including the inaugural show, are known to exist at the Library of Congress, making the show one of the few shows to have any surviving material from before 1948 still in existence. Photos of the first live Hour Glass broadcast taken from a TV monitor during the live telecast, along with a program review, appear in the May 27, 1946 issue of Life.

== See also ==
- 1946-47 United States network television schedule
