= See What You Know =

American television game show

- Genre: Game show
- Presented by: Bennett Cerf
- Country of origin: United States
- No. of seasons: 4

Original release
- Network: CBS
- Release: January 1946 – 1949

See What You Know is an early American television game show that was broadcast on CBS television for four seasons starting in January 1946 and ending for three years in syndication until 1949. It was hosted by Bennett Cerf.

Activities in one episode had guests at a table that contained sound-effects equipment. As Cerf read excerpts from a play, the participants had to create appropriate sounds. Guests on the program included Andre Baruch, Bess Myerson, and Lew Parker.

== Critical response ==
While commending the use of visual activities on the program, a "Second Reviewing" in the trade publication Billboard said that Cerf was "neither telegenic nor amusing" and described the episode reviewed as proceeding "on its usual flubdubbery way, with an impact rating of zero."
