= DuMont Television Network =

American television network (1946–1956)

- Logo used from 1952 to 1956
- Type: Broadcast television network
- Country: United States
- Founded: April 13, 1940; 86 years ago by Allen B. DuMont
- Owner: Allen B. DuMont Laboratories
- Key people: Thomas T. Goldsmith, Jr. (vice president; director of research); Mortimer Loewi (financial consultant); Ted Bergmann (director of sales, 1951–1953; general manager, 1953–1955); Lawrence Phillips (director of broadcasting); Chris Witting (director of broadcasting); Tom Gallery (director of sales); Don McGannon (general manager of O&Os); James Caddigan (director of programming and production); Paul Raibourn (executive vice president, Paramount; Paramount liaison)
- Launch date: August 15, 1946; 80 years ago
- Dissolved: August 6, 1956; 70 years ago (9 years, 357 days)
- Language: English

The DuMont Television Network (also the DuMont Network, DuMont Television, DuMont/Du Mont, or (incorrectly) Dumont (Note: The name of the network has been spelled both "DuMont" and "Du Mont". "Dumont" and "DUMONT" are generally considered incorrect. Weinstein (2004) uses "DuMont" for the name of the network. Bergmann (2002) prefers "Du Mont". For the purposes of this article, the Weinstein spelling is used. (The name was pronounced on-air to sound like DOO-mont, with an accent on the "Du".)) /ˈduːmɒnt/) was one of America's pioneer commercial television networks, rivaling NBC and CBS for the distinction of being first overall in the United States. It was owned by Allen B. DuMont Laboratories, a television equipment and television set manufacturer and broadcasting company. DuMont was founded in 1940 and began operation in 1946.

The network was hindered by the cost of broadcasting, a freeze on new television stations in 1948 by the Federal Communications Commission (FCC), and even by the company's partner, Paramount Pictures. Despite its innovations in broadcasting and launching one of television's biggest stars of the 1950s — Jackie Gleason — the network never reached solid finances. Forced to expand on UHF channels when UHF tuning was not yet standard on television sets, DuMont fought an uphill battle for program clearance outside its three owned-and-operated stations: WABD in New York City (which used its founder's initials as its call letters), WTTG in Washington, D.C. (which used the initials of its chief engineer as its call letters), and WDTV in Pittsburgh (which used a reference to the network itself as its call letters). Its last national broadcast was in 1956, leaving three main national networks other than public broadcasting until the founding of Fox in 1986.

DuMont's obscurity, caused mainly by the destruction of its extensive program archive by the 1970s, has prompted TV historian David Weinstein to refer to it as the "forgotten network." A few popular DuMont programs, such as Cavalcade of Stars, Captain Video, and Emmy Award winner Life Is Worth Living, appear in television retrospectives or are mentioned briefly in books about American television history. In addition, a collection of programs and promos is available on the Roku streaming television channel under the DuMont name.

== History ==
=== Origins ===
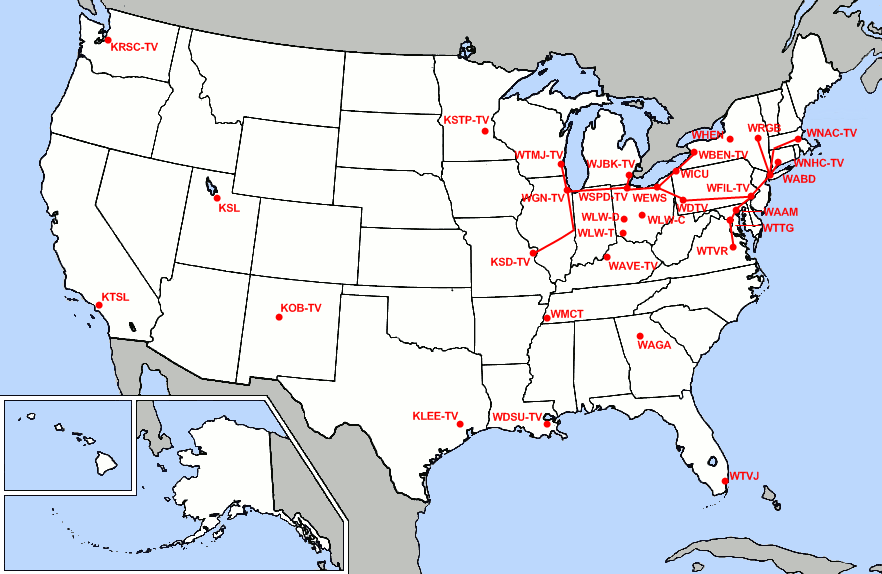
DuMont programs aired in 32 cities by 1949. The live coaxial cable feed stretched from Boston to St. Louis. Other stations received programs via kinescope recordings.

Allen B. DuMont Laboratories was founded with $1,000 in 1931 by Allen B. DuMont in a laboratory in his basement. He and his staff were responsible for such early technical innovations as the first consumer electronic television receiver in 1938. Their most revolutionary contribution came when the team extended the life of a cathode ray tube from 24 to 1,000 hours, making television sets practical for consumers. The company's television receivers soon became the standard of the industry.

During World War II, DuMont worked with the U.S. Army in developing radar, which brought in $5 million for the company in 1942.

Early sales of television receivers were hampered by the lack of regularly scheduled programming. A few months after selling his first set in 1938, DuMont opened his own New York-area television station (W2XVT) in Passaic, New Jersey. In 1940, the station moved to Manhattan as W2XWV on channel 4 and commenced broadcasting on April 13, 1940. Unlike CBS and NBC, which reduced their television broadcasting during World War II, DuMont continued experimental and commercial broadcasts throughout the war. In 1944, W2XWV received its commercial license, the third in New York, under the call letters WABD. In 1945, it moved to channel 5. On May 19, 1945, DuMont opened experimental W3XWT in Washington, DC., which became commercial station WTTG.

Paramount Pictures became a minority shareholder in DuMont Laboratories when it advanced $400,000 in 1939 for a 40% share in the company. Paramount had television interests of its own, having launched stations in Los Angeles in 1939 and Chicago in 1940. DuMont's association with Paramount would later come back to haunt DuMont.

First DuMont logo used until 1952

Soon after his experimental Washington station signed on, DuMont began experimental coaxial cable hookups between his laboratories in Passaic and his two stations. It is said that one of those broadcasts on the hookup announced that the U.S. had dropped an atomic bomb on Nagasaki, Japan, on August 9, 1945. This was later considered the official beginning of the DuMont Network by both Thomas T. Goldsmith, the network's chief engineer and DuMont's best friend, and DuMont himself. Regular network service began on August 15, 1946, on WABD and W3XWT. In November 1946, W3XWT was granted a commercial license, the capital's first, as WTTG, named after Goldsmith. These two DuMont owned-and-operated stations were joined by WDTV (channel 3) in Pittsburgh on January 11, 1949.

Although NBC in New York had station-to-station television links as early as 1940 with WPTZ (KYW) in Philadelphia and WRGB in Schenectady, New York, DuMont received its station licenses before NBC resumed its previously sporadic network broadcasts after the war. ABC had just come into existence as a radio network in 1943 and did not enter network television until 1948 when its flagship station in New York City, WJZ-TV (WABC-TV), began broadcasting. CBS also waited until 1948 to begin network operations, because it was waiting for the Federal Communications Commission to approve its color television system (which eventually occurred in 1950, however the system's mechanical nature and incompatibility with black-and-white receivers proved so unpopular that the FCC rescinded its approval in 1953). Other companies, including Mutual, the Yankee Network, and Paramount, were interested in starting television networks, but were prevented from doing so by restrictive FCC regulations, although the Paramount Television Network had limited success in network operations in the late 1940s and early 1950s.

=== Programming ===
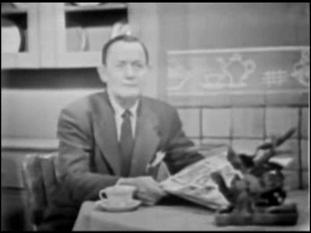
Still from Rocky King, Inside Detective, one of DuMont's most popular programs.

Despite its lack of history in radio programming, an established roster of radio stars, and financial resources comparable to those of competitors such as NBC, CBS, and ABC, DuMont was an innovative network that drew on its connections with Broadway.

The network largely ignored the standard business model of 1950s TV, in which one advertiser sponsored an entire show, enabling it to have complete control over its content. Instead, DuMont sold commercials to several different advertisers, freeing producers of its shows from the veto power held by sole sponsors. This eventually became the standard model for U.S. television. Some commercial time was sold regionally on a co-op basis, while other spots were sold network-wide.

DuMont also holds another important place in American TV history. WDTV's sign-on made it possible for stations in the Midwest to receive live network programming from stations on the East Coast, and vice versa. Before then, the networks relied on separate regional networks in the two time zones for live programming, and the West Coast received network programming from kinescopes (films shot directly from live television screens) originating from the East Coast. On January 11, 1949, the coaxial cable linking East and Midwest (known in television circles as "the Golden Spike," in reference to the golden spike that united the First transcontinental railroad) was activated. The ceremony, hosted by DuMont and WDTV, was carried on all four networks. WGN-TV (channel 9) in Chicago and WABD in New York were able to share programs through a live coaxial cable feed when WDTV signed on in Pittsburgh, because the station completed the East Coast-to-Midwest chain, allowing stations in both regions to air the same program simultaneously, which is still the standard for American TV. It was another two years before the West Coast got live programming from the East (and the East able to get live programming from the West), but this was the beginning of the modern era of network television.

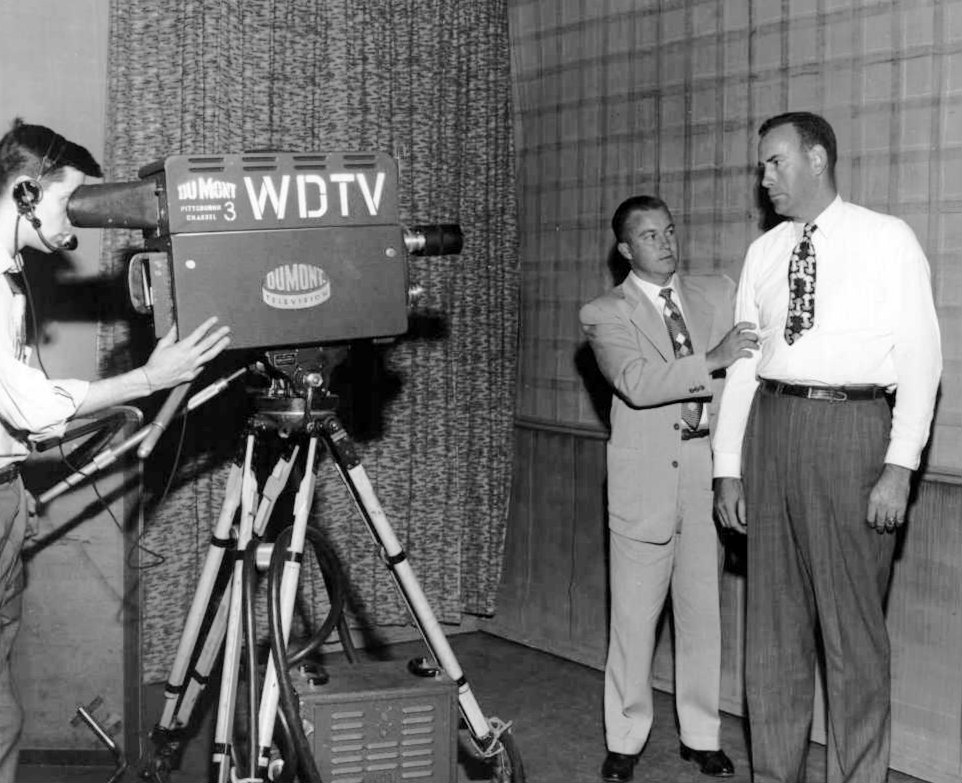
WDTV broadcast of We, the People on April 18, 1952. The tall guest is New York Yankees player Bill Bevens.

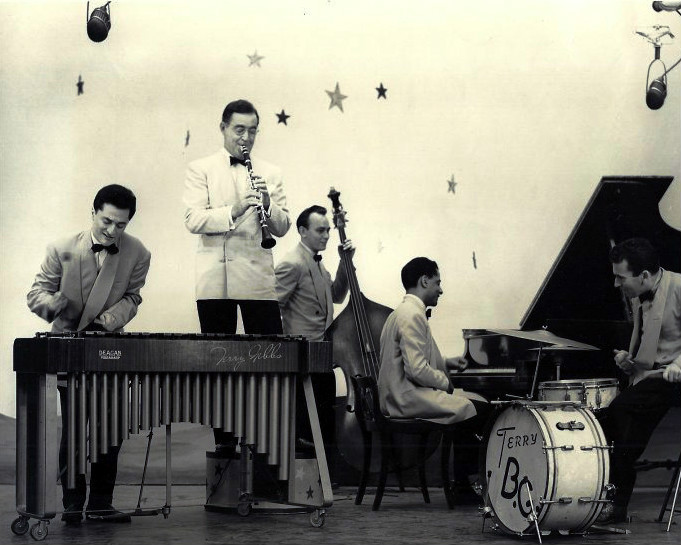
Benny Goodman and his band on the DuMont show Star Time, circa 1950.

The first broadcasts came from DuMont's 515 Madison Avenue headquarters. The company soon found additional space, including a fully functioning theater, in the New York branch of Wanamaker's department store at Ninth Street and Broadway. Later, a lease on the Adelphi Theatre on 54th Street and the Ambassador Theatre on West 49th Street gave the network a site for variety shows. In 1954, the lavish DuMont Tele-Centre opened in the former Jacob Ruppert's Central Opera House at 205 East 67th Street, today the site of the Fox Television Center and home of WABD successor station WNYW.

DuMont was the first network to broadcast a film production for TV: Talk Fast, Mister, produced by RKO in 1944. DuMont also aired the first TV situation comedy, Mary Kay and Johnny, as well as the first network-televised soap opera, Faraway Hill.

Cavalcade of Stars, a variety show hosted by Jackie Gleason, was the birthplace of The Honeymooners skits (Gleason took his variety show to CBS in 1952, but filmed the "Classic 39" Honeymooners episodes at DuMont's Adelphi Theater studio in 1955–56). Roman Catholic Bishop Fulton J. Sheen's devotional program Life Is Worth Living went up against Milton Berle's variety show in many cities, becoming the first show to compete successfully in the ratings against the comedian known as "Mr. Television." In 1952, Sheen won an Emmy Award for "Most Outstanding Personality". The network's other notable programs include:

- Ted Mack's The Original Amateur Hour, which began on radio in the 1930s under original host Major Edward Bowes
- The Morey Amsterdam Show, a comedy/variety show hosted by Morey Amsterdam, which started on CBS before moving to DuMont in 1949
- Captain Video and His Video Rangers, a hugely popular children's science fiction series
- The Arthur Murray Party, a dance program
- Down You Go, a popular panel show
- Rocky King, Inside Detective, a private eye series starring Roscoe Karns
- The Plainclothesman, a camera's-eye-view detective series
- Live coverage of boxing and professional wrestling, the latter featuring matches staged by National Wrestling Alliance member Fred Kohler Enterprises in Chicago under the name Wrestling from Marigold Arena
- The Johns Hopkins Science Review, a Peabody Award-winning education program
- Cash and Carry, the first network-televised game show
- The Ernie Kovacs Show, a comedy variety show hosted by Ernie Kovacs
- The Magic Cottage, a children's show starring artist Patricia Meikle
- The Goldbergs, a warm look at an immigrant Jewish family in New York City, starring its creator and writer Gertrude Berg.

The network also was a pioneer in TV programming aimed at minority audiences and featuring minority performers at a time when the other American networks aired few television series aimed at non-whites. Among DuMont's minority programs were The Gallery of Madame Liu-Tsong, starring film actress Anna May Wong, the first American TV show to star an Asian American person; and The Hazel Scott Show, starring the eponymous singer-pianist in the first American network TV series to be hosted by a black woman.

Although DuMont's programming pre-dated videotape, many DuMont offerings were recorded on the kinescope device developed by Eastman Kodak. These kinescopes were said to be stored in a warehouse until the 1970s. Actress Edie Adams, the wife of comedian Ernie Kovacs (both regular performers on early television) testified in 1996 before a panel of the Library of Congress on the preservation of television and video. Adams claimed that so little value was given to these films that the stored kinescopes were loaded into three trucks and dumped into Upper New York Bay. Nevertheless, a number of DuMont programs survive at The Paley Center for Media in New York, the UCLA Film and Television Archive in Los Angeles, in the Peabody Awards Collection at the University of Georgia, and in the Museum of Broadcast Communications in Chicago, and several surviving DuMont shows have been released on DVD.

Much of what survived was either never properly copyrighted (live telecasts, because they were not set on a fixed medium, were not eligible for copyright at the time, although films of those telecasts could if they contained a proper copyright notice) or lapsed into the public domain in the late 1970s when DuMont's successor-company Metromedia declined to renew the copyrights.

A large number of episodes of Life Is Worth Living have been saved, and they are aired weekly on Catholic-oriented cable network, the Eternal Word Television Network, which also makes a collection of them available on DVD. Several companies that distribute DVDs over the internet have released a small number of episodes of Cavalcade of Stars and The Morey Amsterdam Show. Two more DuMont programs, Captain Video and His Video Rangers and Rocky King, Inside Detective, have had a small number of surviving episodes released commercially by at least one major distributor of public domain programming. Because so few episodes remain of most DuMont series, they are seldom rerun, even though there is no licensing cost to do so.

==== Awards ====
DuMont programs were by necessity low-budget affairs, and the network received relatively few awards from the TV industry. Most awards during the 1950s went to NBC and CBS, who were able to out-spend other companies and draw on their extensive history of radio broadcasting in the relatively new television medium.

During the 1952–53 TV season, the aforementioned Bishop Sheen won an Emmy Award for Most Outstanding Personality. Sheen beat out three CBS nominees -- Arthur Godfrey, Edward R. Murrow, and Lucille Ball -- for the honors. Sheen also was nominated for Public Service Emmys in 1952, 1953, and 1954.

DuMont received an Emmy nomination for Down You Go, a popular game show during the 1952–53 television season (in the category Best Audience Participation, Quiz, or Panel Program). The network was nominated twice for its coverage of professional football during the 1953–54 and 1954–55 television seasons.

The Johns Hopkins Science Review, a DuMont public affairs program, was awarded a Peabody Award in 1952 in the Education category. Sheen's Emmy and the Science Review Peabody were the only national awards the DuMont Network received. Though DuMont series and performers continued to win local TV awards, by the mid-1950s the DuMont network no longer had a national presence.

==== Ratings ====
Videodex 62 City Ratings
First week of August 1950
| Rank | Series | Network | # of cities | % TV homes |
| 1 | Toast of the Town | CBS | 34 | 37.2 |
| 2 | Stop the Music | ABC | 50 | 28.4 |
| 3 | Kraft Television Theater | NBC | 34 | 27.5 |
| 4 | Ford Star Revue | NBC | 45 | 26.9 |
| 5 | The Garry Moore Show | CBS | 19 | 26.4 |
| 6 | The Big Story | NBC | 32 | 25.6 |
| 7 | The Original Amateur Hour | NBC | 54 | 25.3 |
| 8 | Break the Bank | NBC | 42 | 24.2 |
| 9 | The Lone Ranger | ABC | 39 | 23.9 |
| 10 | Your Hit Parade | NBC | 18 | 23.7 |
| 11 | Cavalcade of Stars | DuMont | 20 | 22.2 |
| 12 | Mama | CBS | 16 | 22.0 |
| 13 | Wrestling | DuMont | 15 | 21.4 |
| 14 | Beat the Clock | CBS | 33 | 20.7 |
| 15 | Masterpiece Playhouse | NBC | 32 | 19.2 |

The earliest measurements of TV audiences were performed by the C. E. Hooper company of New York. DuMont performed well in the Hooper ratings; in fact, DuMont's talent program, The Original Amateur Hour, was the most popular series of the 1947–48 season. Two seasons later, Variety ranked DuMont's popular variety series Cavalcade of Stars as the 10th most popular series.

In February 1950, Hooper's competitor A. C. Nielsen bought out the Hooper ratings system. DuMont did not fare well with the change: none of its shows appeared on Nielsen's annual top 20 lists of the most popular series. The aforementioned Life is Worth Living did receive Nielsen ratings of up to 11.1, meaning that it attracted more than 10 million viewers. Bishop Sheen's one-man program – in which he discussed philosophy, psychology, and other fields of thought from a Christian perspective – was the most widely viewed religious series in the history of television. 169 local television stations aired Life, and for three years the program competed successfully against NBC's popular The Milton Berle Show. The ABC and CBS programs that aired in the same timeslot were canceled.

Life is Worth Living was not the only DuMont program to achieve double-digit ratings. In 1952, Time magazine reported that popular DuMont game show Down You Go had attracted an audience estimated at 16 million viewers. Similarly, DuMont's summer 1954 replacement series, The Goldbergs, achieved audiences estimated at 10 million. Still, these series were only moderately popular compared to NBC's and CBS's highest-rated programs.

Nielsen was not the only company to report TV ratings. Companies such as Trendex, Videodex, and Arbitron had also measured TV viewership. The chart in this section comes from Videodex's August 1950 ratings breakdown, as reported in Billboard magazine.

=== Disputes with AT&T and Paramount ===
DuMont struggled to get its programs aired in many parts of the country, in part due to technical limitations of network lines maintained by telephone company AT&T Corporation. During the 1940s and 1950s, television signals were sent between stations via coaxial cable and microwave links owned by AT&T. The service provider did not have enough circuits to provide signal relay service from the four networks to all of their affiliates at the same time, so AT&T allocated times when each network could offer live programs to its affiliates. In 1950, AT&T allotted NBC and CBS each over 100 hours of live prime time network service, but gave ABC 53 hours, and DuMont 37. AT&T also required each television network to lease both radio and television lines. DuMont was the only television network without a radio network, so it was the only network forced to pay for a service it did not use. DuMont protested AT&T's actions with the Federal Communications Commission, and eventually reached a compromise.

DuMont's biggest corporate hurdle may have been with the company's own partner, Paramount. Relations between the two companies were strained as early as 1939 when Paramount opened experimental television stations in Los Angeles and Chicago without DuMont's involvement. Dr. DuMont claimed that the original 1937 acquisition proposal required Paramount to expand its television interests "through DuMont". Paramount representative Paul Raibourn, who also was a member of DuMont's board of directors, denied that any such restriction had ever been discussed, but Dr. DuMont was vindicated by a 1953 examination of the original draft document.

DuMont aspired to grow beyond its three stations, applying for new television station licenses in Cincinnati and Cleveland in 1947. This would have given the network five owned-and-operated stations (O&Os), the maximum allowed by the FCC at the time. However, DuMont was hampered by Paramount's two stations -- KTLA (channel 5) in Los Angeles and WBKB (channel 4, now WBBM-TV on channel 2) in Chicago – the descendants of the two experimental stations that rankled DuMont in 1940. Although these stations generally did not carry DuMont programming (KTLA did for just one year, 1947 to 1948), and, in fact, competed against DuMont's affiliates in those cities the FCC ruled that Paramount essentially controlled DuMont, which effectively placed the network at the five-station cap. Paramount's exertion of influence over the network's management and the power of its voting stock led the FCC to its conclusion. Thus, DuMont was unable to open additional stations as long as Paramount owned stations or owned a portion of DuMont. Paramount refused to sell.

In 1949, Paramount Pictures launched the Paramount Television Network, a service that provided local television stations with filmed television programs. Paramount's network "undercut the company that it had invested in." Paramount did not share its stars, big budgets, or filmed programs with DuMont; the company had stopped financially supporting DuMont in 1941. Although Paramount executives indicated they would produce programs for DuMont, the studio never supplied the network with programs or technical assistance. The acrimonious relationship between Paramount and DuMont climaxed during the 1953 FCC hearings regarding the ABC–United Paramount Theaters merger when Paul Raibourn, an executive at Paramount, publicly derided the quality of DuMont television sets in court testimony.

=== Early troubles ===
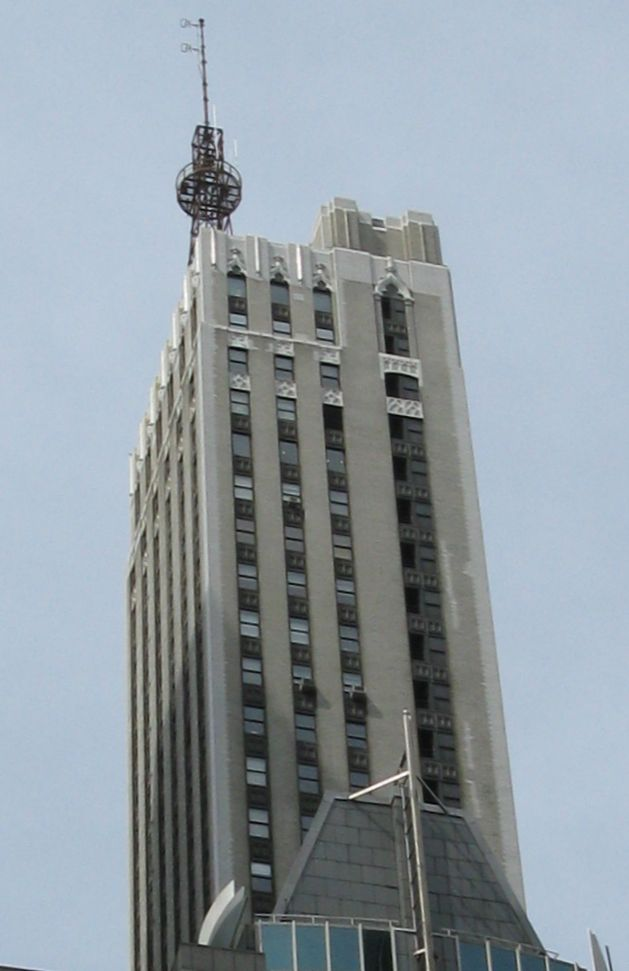
The DuMont Building at 515 Madison Avenue in New York, with the original WABD broadcast tower still standing, April 2008.

DuMont began with one basic disadvantage: unlike NBC, CBS and ABC, it did not have a radio network from which to draw big-name talent, affiliate loyalty, or radio profits to underwrite television operations until the television medium itself became profitable. Most early television licenses were granted to established radio broadcasters, and many longtime relationships with radio networks carried over to the new medium. As CBS and NBC (and to a lesser extent, ABC) gained their footing, they began to offer programming that drew on their radio backgrounds, bringing over the most popular radio stars. Early television station owners, when deciding which network would receive their main affiliation, were more likely to choose CBS's roster of Lucille Ball, Jack Benny, and Ed Sullivan, or NBC's lineup of Milton Berle and Sid Caesar, over DuMont, which offered a then-unknown Jackie Gleason and Bishop Fulton J. Sheen. In smaller markets, with a limited number of stations, DuMont and ABC were often relegated to secondary status, so their programs got clearance only if the primary network was off the air or delayed via kinescope recording ("tele-transcriptions," in DuMont parlance).

Adding to DuMont's troubles was the FCC's 1948 "freeze" on television license applications. This was done to sort out the thousands of applications that had come streaming in, but also to rethink the allocation and technical standards laid down prior to World War II. It became clear soon after the war that 12 channels ("channel 1" had been removed from television broadcasting in 1948 for allocation to land-mobile radio) were not nearly enough for national television service. What was to be a six-month freeze lasted until 1952, when the FCC opened the UHF spectrum. The FCC, however, did not require television manufacturers to include UHF capability. To see UHF stations, most consumers had to buy expensive converters. Even then, the picture quality was marginal at best, depending on geographic location.. Tied to this was a decision to restrict VHF allocations in medium- and smaller-sized markets. Meanwhile, television sets would not be required to have all-channel tuning until 1964, with the passage of the All-Channel Receiver Act.

Forced to rely on UHF to expand, DuMont saw one station after another go dark due to dismal ratings. It bought small, distressed UHF station KCTY (channel 25) in Kansas City, Missouri, in 1954, but ran it for just three months before shutting it down at a considerable loss after attempting to compete with three established VHF stations.

The FCC's Hyman H. Goldin said in 1960, "If there had been four VHF outlets in the top markets, there's no question DuMont would have lived and would have eventually turned the corner in terms of profitability."

=== Decline and the end of the network ===
During the early years of television, there was some measure of cooperation among the four major U.S. networks. However, as television grew into a profitable business, an intense rivalry developed among the networks, just as it had in radio. NBC and CBS competed fiercely for viewers and advertising dollars, a contest neither underfunded DuMont nor ABC could hope to win. According to author Dennis Mazzocco, "NBC tried to make an arrangement with ABC and CBS to destroy the DuMont network." The plan was for NBC and CBS to exclusively offer ABC their most popular series after they had aired on the bigger networks. ABC would become a network of re-runs, but DuMont would be shut out. ABC president Leonard Goldenson rejected NBC executive David Sarnoff's proposal, but did not report it to the Justice Department.

DuMont survived the early 1950s only because of WDTV in Pittsburgh, the lone commercial VHF station in what then was the sixth-largest market in the country after New York City, Chicago, Los Angeles, Philadelphia, and Washington. WDTV's only competition came from UHF stations WENS-TV (on the frequency now occupied by WINP-TV) and WKJF-TV (now WPGH-TV) and distant stations from Johnstown, Pennsylvania, Youngstown, Ohio, and Wheeling, West Virginia. There also were external factors such as the FCC's freeze on licenses and intense competition for the remaining VHF licenses in Pittsburgh, including WENS-TV appealing the FCC's granting of the channel 11 license that was eventually affirmed for WIIC-TV (now WPXI), the battle between the Hearst Corporation (then-owners of WCAE) and KQV over the channel 4 license that eventually would become WTAE-TV, and -- perhaps the most impactful one to DuMont's future -- locally based Westinghouse Electric Corporation (owners of radio pioneer KDKA) battling with local interest groups for the channel 13 license that was intended to be a non-commercial license. The FCC also denied CBS's request to be granted the channel 9 allocation in nearby Steubenville, Ohio, and move it to Pittsburgh so Steubenville had a chance to have its own television station. As a result, no other commercial VHF station signed on in Pittsburgh until WIIC-TV in 1957, giving WDTV a de facto monopoly on television in the area. Since WDTV carried secondary affiliations with the other three networks, DuMont used this as a bargaining chip to get its programs cleared in other large markets.

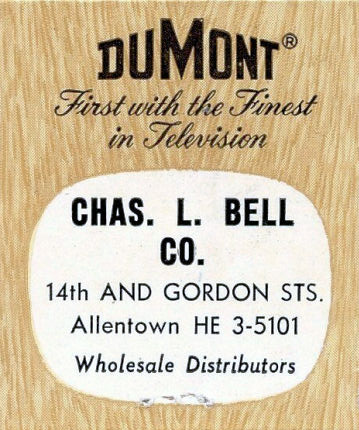
"DUMONT First with the Finest in Television" 1951 Matchbook

Despite its severe financial straits, by 1953 DuMont appeared to be on its way to establishing itself as the third national network. despite a smaller footprint than ABC. While DuMont programs aired live on 16 stations, the network could count on only seven primary stations – its three owned-and-operated stations ("O&Os) plus WGN-TV in Chicago, KTTV (channel 11) in Los Angeles, KFEL-TV (channel 2, now KWGN-TV) in Denver, and WTVN-TV (channel 6, now WSYX) in Columbus, Ohio.

In contrast, by 1953 ABC had a full complement of five O&Os, augmented by nine primary affiliates. ABC also had a radio network descended from NBC's Blue Network from which to draw talent, affiliate loyalty, and generate income to subsidize television operations. However, ABC had only 14 primary stations, while CBS and NBC had over 40 each. By 1951, ABC was badly overextended and on the verge of bankruptcy. That year, the company announced a merger with United Paramount Theaters (UPT) (the former theater division of Paramount Pictures, which was spun off as a result of the United States v. Paramount Pictures, Inc. antitrust decision), but it was not until 1953 that the FCC approved the merger.

By this time, DuMont had begun to differentiate itself from NBC and CBS. It allowed its advertisers to choose the locations where their advertising ran, potentially saving them millions of dollars. By contrast, ABC followed NBC's and CBS's practice of forcing advertisers to purchase a large "must-buy" list of stations, even though it was only a fourth the size of NBC and CBS.

ABC's fortunes were dramatically altered in February 1953, when the FCC cleared the way for UPT to buy the network. The merger provided ABC with a badly needed cash infusion, giving it the resources to mount "top shelf" programming and to provide a national television service on a scale approaching that of CBS and NBC. Through UPT president Goldenson, ABC also gained ties with the Hollywood studios that more than matched those DuMont's producers had with Broadway.

Realizing that ABC had more resources than they could even begin to match, DuMont officials were receptive to a merger offer from ABC. Goldenson quickly brokered a deal with Ted Bergmann, DuMont's managing director, under which the merged network would have been called "ABC-DuMont" until at least 1958 and would have honored all of DuMont's network commitments. In return, DuMont would get $5 million in cash, guaranteed advertising time for DuMont sets, and a secure future for its staff.

A merged ABC-DuMont would have been an entity rivaling CBS and NBC, as it would have owned stations in five of the six largest U.S. television markets (excluding only Philadelphia) as well as ABC's radio network. It also would have inherited DuMont's de facto monopoly in Pittsburgh and would have been one of two networks, along with NBC, to have full ownership of a station in the nation's capital. However, it would have had to sell a New York station – either DuMont flagship WABD or ABC flagship WJZ-TV (channel 7, now WABC-TV), probably the former. It also would have had to sell two other stations – most likely ABC's two smallest O&Os, WXYZ-TV in Detroit and KGO-TV in San Francisco (both broadcasting on channel 7) – to get under the FCC's limit of five stations per owner.

However, Paramount vetoed the plan almost out of hand due to antitrust concerns. A few months earlier, the FCC had ruled that Paramount controlled DuMont, and there still were some questions about whether UPT had really separated from Paramount.

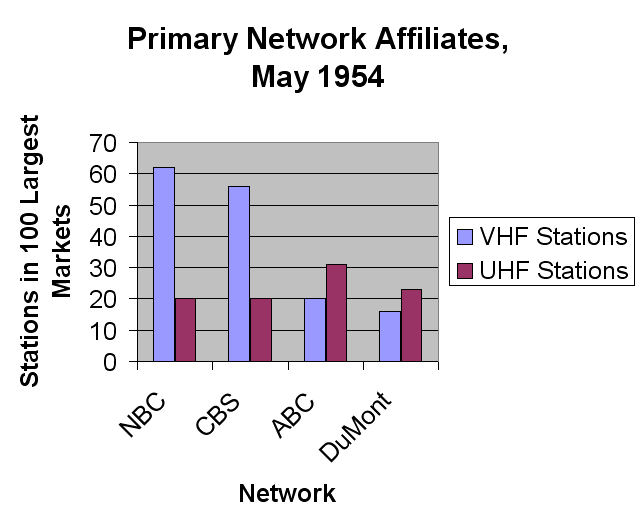
Table showing primary station affiliation for each of the four U.S. commercial television networks in 1954. DuMont had primary affiliation agreements with 39 stations in the largest markets, but most of these stations were poorly watched UHF stations.

With no other way to readily obtain cash, DuMont sold WDTV to Westinghouse for $9.75 million in late 1954, after Westinghouse decided to give public backing to the public interest groups for the channel 13 allocation in Pittsburgh, allowing the station to launch that spring as educational WQED. While this gave DuMont a short-term cash infusion, it eliminated the leverage the network had to get program clearances in other markets. Without its de facto monopoly in Pittsburgh, the company's advertising revenue shrank to less than half that of 1953. By February 1955, DuMont realized it could not continue in network television. The decision was made to shut down network operations and operate WABD and WTTG as independent stations.

On April 1, 1955, most of DuMont's entertainment programs were dropped. Bishop Sheen aired his last program on DuMont on April 26 but later moved it to ABC. By May, just eight programs were left on the network, with only inexpensive shows and sporting events keeping the remains of the network going through the summer. The network also largely abandoned the use of the intercity network coaxial cable, on which it had spent $3 million in 1954 to transmit shows that mostly lacked station clearance. The company only retained network links for live sports programming and utilizing the company's Electronicam process to produce studio-based programming. Electronicam is best remembered for being used by Jackie Gleason's producers for the 39-half-hour episodes of The Honeymooners that aired on CBS during the 1955–56 television season.

In August 1955, Paramount, with the help of other stockholders, seized full control of DuMont Laboratories. Shareholders approved spinning off the broadcasting operations in August 1955, and all remaining sponsored shows on the network were dropped. The last non-sports program on DuMont, the game show What's the Story, aired on September 23, 1955. After that, DuMont's network feed was used only for occasional sporting events.

Historians Tim Brooks and Earle Marsh write that DuMont's last official broadcast was a boxing match on the program Boxing from St. Nicholas Arena, also known as Monday Night Fights at St. Nicholas Arena, on August 6, 1956. St. Nicholas Arena was then syndicated from WABD, under the "DuMont" banner, to a network of 37 stations initially. Most were affiliates of ABC. WABD continued to syndicate St. Nicholas Arena to a dwindling affiliate base until the program's last broadcast on August 4, 1958, which aired on only five stations. Journalist Steve Tober writes that DuMont syndicated a Thanksgiving game of high school football in 1957. It was broadcast in black and white and in color, the latter being rare for TV at the time. One of the teams playing was from Montclair, New Jersey, the hometown of Allen DuMont himself.

In September 1955, DuMont Laboratories spun off WABD and WTTG as the DuMont Broadcasting Corporation; in requesting the FCC's approval of the reorganization, it told the commission that the network "could not be operated profitably under the existing system of allocation and control of television broadcast stations and affiliations". The name was later changed to "Metropolitan Broadcasting Company" to distance the company from what was seen as a complete failure. In 1958, John Kluge bought Paramount's shares for $4 million, and in 1961 renamed the company Metromedia. WABD became WNEW-TV and later WNYW. WTTG still broadcasts under its original call letters as a Fox owned-and-operated station.

For 50 years, DuMont was the only major broadcast television network to cease operations, until CBS Corporation and Time Warner merged two other struggling networks, UPN and The WB, in September 2006, to create The CW Television Network.

== Fate of the DuMont stations ==
All three DuMont-owned stations still are operating and are owned-and-operated stations (O&O's) of their respective networks, just as when they were part of DuMont. Of the three, only Washington's WTTG still has its original call letters.

WTTG and New York's WABD (later WNEW-TV, and now WNYW) survived as Metromedia-owned independents until 1986, when they were purchased by the News Corporation to form the nucleus of the new Fox television network. Clarke Ingram, who maintained a DuMont memorial site, has suggested that Fox can be considered a revival, or at least a linear descendant, of DuMont.

Westinghouse changed WDTV's call letters to KDKA-TV after the pioneering radio station of the same name, and switched its primary affiliation to CBS immediately after the sale. Westinghouse's acquisition of CBS in 1995 made KDKA-TV a CBS owned-and-operated station.

Two of the four primary DuMont affiliates would also eventually join Fox. KTTV would be purchased by DuMont descendant Metromedia in 1963 and ended up being one of the charter Fox O&O's alongside WNYW and WTTG. WSYX (the former WTVN-TV), which became a primary ABC affiliate upon DuMont's collapse after serving as a dual affiliate of both networks, added Fox programming to its third digital subchannel in 2021 when present day owners Sinclair Broadcast Group consolidated the intellectual property of LMA sister station WTTE (including its "Fox 28" branding) onto WSYX as part of fellow LMA sister station WWHO's conversation to ATSC 3.0. WGN-TV and KWGN-TV (the former KFEL-TV) are both currently owned by Nexstar Media Group as O&O's of The CW.

== DuMont programming library ==
DuMont produced more than 20,000 television episodes from 1946 to 1956. Because they were created prior to the Ampex electronic videotape recorder in late 1956, they were broadcast live in black and white and recorded on film kinescope for West Coast rebroadcast and reruns. By the early 1970s, their vast library of 35mm and 16mm kinescopes wound up in the hands of "a successor network" (most likely Metromedia) that reportedly disposed of them in New York City's East River to make warehouse space for videotapes.

Although other films submerged for decades have been successfully recovered (as an example, a reel of The Carpet from Bagdad was recovered from the wreck of the Lusitania), there have been no salvage-diving efforts to locate or recover the DuMont archive. If any of the films have even survived in that environment, they will likely be damaged. Other kinescopes were put through a reclaiming process to recover the silver from the photo emulsion on black-and-white film.

It is estimated that about 350 complete DuMont television shows survive, including seven early Jackie Gleason's Honeymooners comedy sketches from 1951–1952. Most of the existing episodes are believed to have come from the personal archives of DuMont's hosts, such as Gleason and Dennis James.

== Affiliates ==
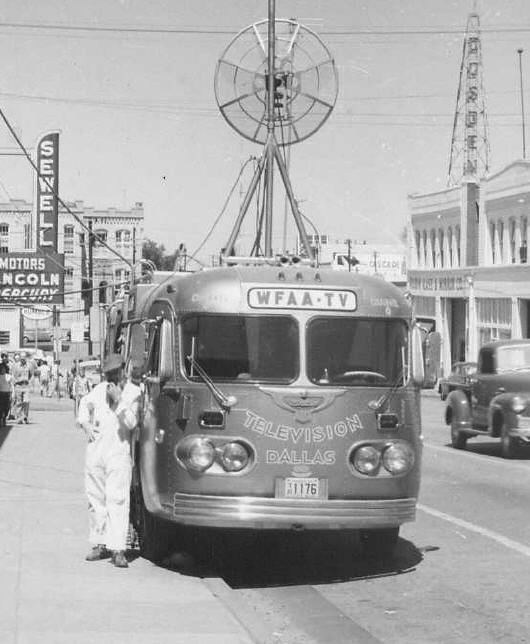
A DuMont Telecruiser, circa 1953. This mobile TV unit, Model B, Serial Number 101, was built by DuMont Labs for KBTV in Dallas. It was in use until the early 1970s.

At its peak in 1954, DuMont was affiliated with around 200 television stations. In those days, television stations were free to "cherry-pick" which programs they would air, and many stations affiliated with multiple networks, depending mainly on the number of commercial television stations available in a market at a given time (markets where only one commercial station was available carried programming from all four major networks). Many of DuMont's "affiliates" carried very little DuMont programming, choosing to air one or two more popular programs (such as Life Is Worth Living) and/or sports programming on the weekends. Few stations carried the full DuMont program lineup. For example, the promising WKLO-TV (UHF Ch. 21) in the growing Louisville, Kentucky/Indiana market had to split its time between DuMont and ABC-TV. The station lasted only seven months (September 1953 – April 1954) on the air.

In its later years, DuMont was carried mostly on poorly watched UHF channels or had only secondary affiliations on VHF stations. DuMont ended most operations on April 1, 1955, but honored network commitments until August 1956.

=== Kinescopes ===
- Kinescopes of DuMont Network programs, from the Internet Archive: The Adventures of Ellery Queen, Captain Video and His Video Rangers, Cavalcade of Stars, Life Is Worth Living, Miss U.S. Television 1950 Contest, The Morey Amsterdam Show, The Old American Barn Dance, Okay Mother, On Your Way, Public Prosecutor, Rocky King — Detective, School House, They Stand Accused and A DuMont Network identification

== See also ==
- Fourth television network
- Golden Age of Television
- List of DuMont programs
- List of surviving DuMont Television Network broadcasts
- List of DuMont Television Network affiliates
- Major League Baseball on DuMont
- NBA on DuMont
- NFL on DuMont
- Television broadcasts of the 1952 Democratic and Republican National Conventions
- Passaic: Birthplace of Television and the DuMont Story (1951 TV special on history of DuMont)
