= I Love to Eat =

- Genre: Cooking
- Presented by: James Beard
- Country of origin: United States

Production
- Running time: 15 minutes 30 minutes (April–May 1947)

Original release
- Network: NBC
- Release: August 30, 1946 – May 18, 1947

I Love to Eat is a live television series on NBC that aired from August 30, 1946, to May 18, 1947, and is a cooking show hosted by chef and cookbook author James Beard. The show is notable for having been the first network television cooking show to air in the United States.

The show came after several successful one-off TV cooking segments featuring Beard alongside other chefs, including on shows like Radio City Matinée (May 1946) and For You And Yours (June 1946).

== Schedule ==
When the show started, each episode was 15 minutes long and presented at 8:15 p.m. EST on Fridays. In November it moved to 8:30 p.m. EST on Fridays, immediately before The World in Your Home at 8:45 p.m. However, this was later changed to 30 minutes on Thursdays at 8:45 p.m. (April–May 1947) as more complicated recipes were demonstrated and prepared.

== Format ==
The Borden-sponsored program opened with a sketch of Elsie, the famed Borden cow. Then Beard, appearing behind a kitchen counter, took over to demonstrate the preparation of some of his unique dishes for the live television audience.

== Personnel ==
The program also featured Elsie de Wolfe, who was described as a "Manhattan socialite". The producer was Patricia Kennedy.

== Episode status ==
No footage from the show remains, since methods to record live television such as kinescopes were not invented until 1947. However, an audio recording of one episode survives. As documented in the Library of Congress archives, the audio recordings of episodes from I Love to Eat (as recorded from live TV broadcasts over WNBT in New York City in 1946–47) include a 1947 episode featuring a ski report and ski luncheon discussions by Beard. This is followed by prolonged live commercials from Borden, including Elsie the Cow as show sponsor, while Beard recounts his dream about Elsie as part of the show.

== See also ==
- 1946-47 United States network television schedule
