= 1945 in American television =

This is a list of American television-related events in 1945.

== Events ==
- February 25 - The script for a February 25, 1945, broadcast of Ladies Be Seated, which was a relatively popular audience-participation/stunt game show on Blue Network radio, still exists, and is reprinted in full in Ritchie. It is, in fact, the script for the first broadcast of the show in television. It was hosted by Johnny Olson, who would later become the long-running announcer on most of CBS's Goodson-Todman-produced game shows, most notably Match Game and The Price Is Right.
- On May 8, 1945, WNBT broadcast hours of news coverage on the end of World War II in Europe, and remotes from around New York City. This event was pre-promoted by NBC with a direct-mail card sent to television set owners in the New York City area. At one point, a WNBT camera placed atop the marquee of the Astor Hotel in New York City panned the crowd below celebrating the end of the war in Europe.

== Television programs ==
=== Debuts ===
Date	Debut	Network
February 27	Ladies Be Seated	Blue Network
February	Dr. Death	WNBT
October	Teletruth	WNBT
Date uncertain	On Stage, Everybody	WABD
Date uncertain	Television Quarterback	WNBT
