= 1945 in television =

The year 1945 in television involved some significant events. Below is a list of television-related events during 1945.

== Events ==
- until July - The final months of World War II continue to disrupt television operations in Europe.
- October 1 – The U.S. War Production Board ends its wartime ban on the manufacture of radio and television equipment for consumer use.
- October 10 – Reopening of French TV station RDF in 441-line standard.
- December 1 – US Army-Navy football game is transmitted 145 kilometers (90 mi) by coaxial cable from Philadelphia to New York City.
- December 15 – Moscow TV center reinstates regular TV broadcasting after World War II.
- December 17 – First weather programme on French television.

== Television shows ==
| Series | Debut | Ended | Network |
|---|---|---|---|
| Dr. Death | 1945 | 1945 | NBC |
| On Stage, Everybody | 1945 | 1945 | Dumont |
| Serving Through Science | May 1945 | May 27, 1947 | Dumont |
| Teletruth | 1945 | 194? | NBC |
| Television Quarterback | 1945 | 1947 | NBC |

== Programs ending ==
| Date | Show | Debut |
|---|---|---|
| Unknown | The War As It Happens | February 21, 1944 |
| Unknown | The Face of the War | July 18, 1941 |

== Births ==
- January 9
  - John Doman, actor, The Wire, Gotham
  - Michael Jaffe, American TV and film producer
- January 22 – Steve Vinovich, actor
- January 25
  - Jill Townsend, actress, Cimarron Strip, Poldark
  - Leigh Taylor-Young, actress, Peyton Place
- January 26 – Jacqueline Ray, actress
- January 29 – Tom Selleck, actor, Magnum, P.I., Blue Bloods
- February 6 – Michael Tucker, actor, L.A. Law
- February 9 – Mia Farrow, actress, model, Peyton Place
- February 20 – George Smoot, American astrophysicist
- February 22 – Leslie Charleson, American soap actress, General Hospital
- February 24 – Barry Bostwick, actor, Spin City, Phineas and Ferb
- February 26 – Marta Kristen, Norwegian actress, Lost in Space
- March 1 – Dirk Benedict, actor, Battlestar Galactica, The A-Team
- March 3 - Hattie Winston, actress, The Electric Company, Becker
- March 5 - George Crile III, American journalist (died 2006)
- March 8 – Micky Dolenz, singer, actor, The Monkees
- March 20 - Pat Riley, NBA basketball player and coach
- March 31 - Gabe Kaplan, actor, comedian, Welcome Back, Kotter
- April 1 - Heather Young, actress, Land of the Giants
- April 2 - Linda Hunt, actress, NCIS: Los Angeles
- April 13 – Tony Dow, actor, Leave It to Beaver (died 2022)
- April 23 – François Clemmons, actor
- May 7 - Robin Strasser, actress, One Life to Live
- May 10 - Bill Geist, television journalist
- May 12 - Linda Carlson, actress (died 2021)
- May 21 – Richard Hatch, actor, Battlestar Galactica (died 2017)
- May 22 - Victoria Wyndham, actress, Another World
- May 23 - Lauren Chapin, actress, Father Knows Best
- May 24 – Priscilla Presley, actress
- June 1 – Kerry Vincent, Australian chef and author (died 2021)
- June 2
  - Joan Pringle, actress, General Hospital, The White Shadow
  - Jon Peters, film producer
  - Lord David Dundas, actor
- June 6 – David Dukes, actor (died 2000)
- June 11 – Adrienne Barbeau, actress, Maude
- June 27 – Clive Clark, golfer
- July 3 – Mickey Rooney Jr., actor (died 2022)
- July 6 – Burt Ward, actor, Batman
- July 10 – Ron Glass, actor, Barney Miller (died 2016)
- July 13 – Penelope Windust, actress (died 2022)
- July 23 – Edie McClurg, actress
- July 24 – Lowell Bergman, producer
- July 26 – Helen Mirren, actress
- July 31 – Robin Green, producer
- August 1 - Laila Morse, actress
- August 2 - Joanna Cassidy, actress
- August 5 - Loni Anderson, actress, WKRP in Cincinnati (died 2025)
- August 14
  - Steve Martin, actor, comedian
  - Brenda Benet, actress (died 1982)
- August 16 - Bob Balaban, actor
- August 22
  - Steve Kroft, American retired journalist
  - David Chase, American producer
- August 24 – Vince McMahon, businessman
- September 1
  - Valdy, musician
  - Edd Kalehoff, musician
  - Ed. Weinberger, producer
- September 10 – Dennis Burkley, actor (died 2013)
- September 12 – Maria Aitken, actress
- September 17 – Phil Jackson, NBA basketball player and coach
- September 19 – Randolph Mantooth, actor, Emergency!
- September 23 – Paul Petersen, actor
- September 24 – Lou Dobbs, TV host (Lou Dobbs Tonight) (died 2024)
- September 25 – Catherine Burns, actress (died 2019)
- October 4 – Clifton Davis, actor, That's My Mama, Amen
- October 5 – Riaan Cruywagen, South African newsreader
- October 11 – Dusty Rhodes, pro wrestler in NWA and WWE (died 2015)
- October 13 – Susan Stafford, hostess
- October 18 – Huell Howser, host of California's Gold (died 2013)
- October 19 – John Lithgow, actor, Third Rock from the Sun
- October 20 – George Wyner, actor
- October 21 – Everett McGill, actor, Twin Peaks
- October 26 – Jaclyn Smith, actress, Charlie's Angels
- October 27 – Carrie Snodgress, actress (died 2004)
- October 30 – Henry Winkler, actor, Arthur Fonzarelli on Happy Days
- October 31 – Brian Doyle-Murray, actor, comedian, Saturday Night Live, SpongeBob SquarePants, Teamo Supremo, The Buzz on Maggie, My Gym Partner's a Monkey, The Marvelous Misadventures of Flapjack, Kick Buttowski: Suburban Daredevil
- November 9 - Charlie Robinson, actor, Night Court (died 2021)
- November 15 - Bob Gunton, actor, Daredevil
- November 21 – Goldie Hawn, actress, Rowan and Martin's Laugh-In
- November 26 – Daniel Davis, actor, The Nanny
- November 27
  - Barbara Anderson, actress, Ironside
  - James Avery, actor, The Fresh Prince of Bel-Air (died 2013)
  - Alain de Cadenet, motor racing commentator, previously driver (died 2022)
- December 1 – Bette Midler, actress, singer
- December 9 – Michael Nouri, actor
- December 13 - Kathy Garver, actress, Family Affair
- December 15 - Thaao Penghlis, actor, General Hospital, Days of Our Lives, Santa Barbara
- December 17 - Chris Matthews, talk show host
- December 22 – Diane Sawyer, television broadcast journalist
- December 25
  - Gary Sandy, actor, WKRP in Cincinnati
  - Paul Willson, actor
- December 26 - John Walsh, television personality, America's Most Wanted, The Hunt with John Walsh
- December 27 - Mark Johnson, television producer
- December 30
  - Davy Jones, singer, actor, The Monkees (died 2012)
  - Concetta Tomei, actress, China Beach, Providence
