= Anders Iwers =

Swedish guitarist and bassist

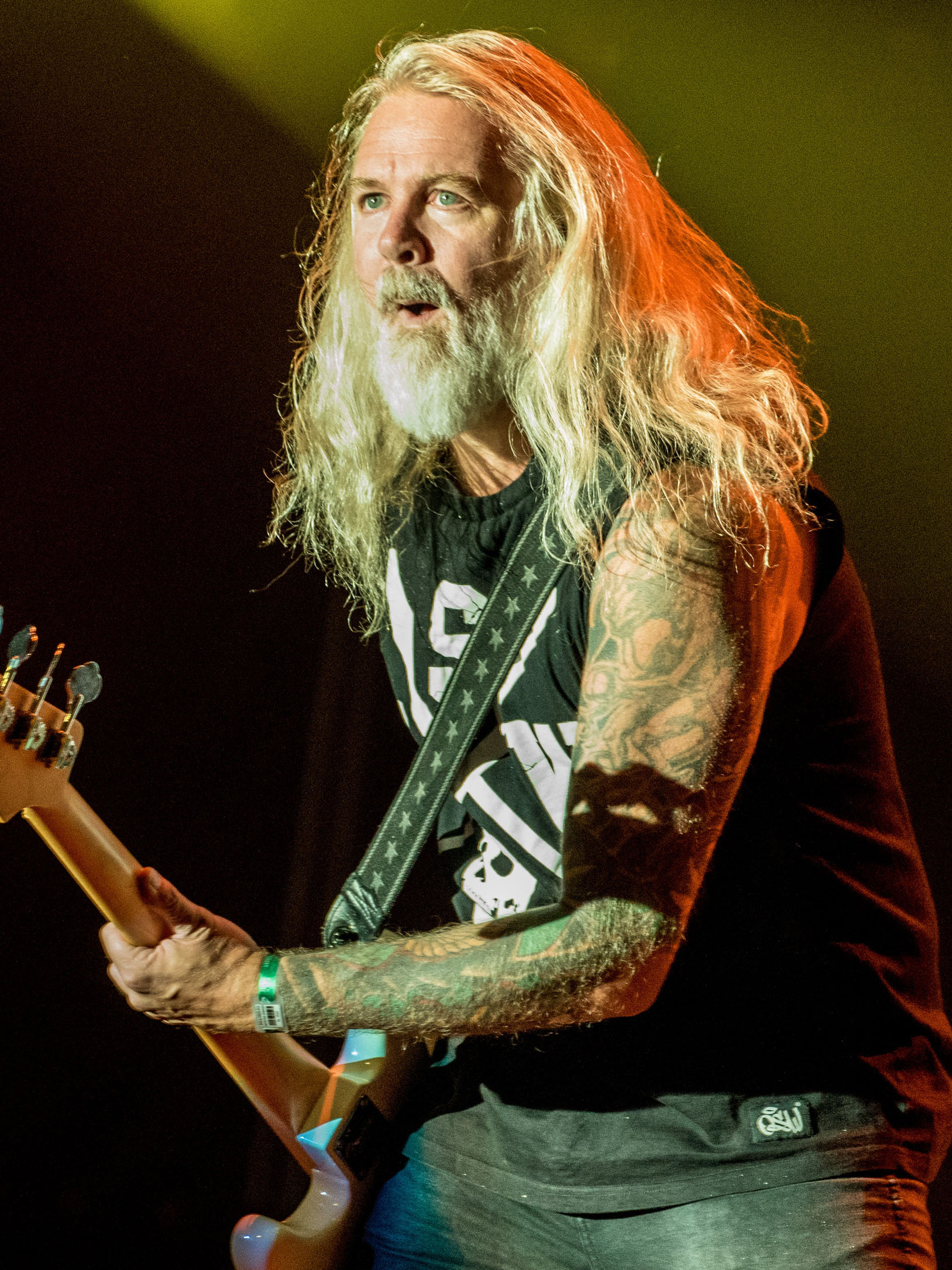
- Iwers in 2018

Background information
- Born: 6 October 1972 (age 52); Gothenburg, Sweden
- Genres: Melodic death metal, gothic metal
- Occupation: Musician
- Instrument(s): Bass, guitar

Anders Iwers (born 6 October 1972) is a Swedish heavy metal musician and bassist of the bands Tiamat and Avatarium. He is the older brother of former In Flames bassist Peter Iwers, a band which he was lead guitarist of in their early years.

Iwers is a former member of the melodic death metal band Dark Tranquillity. He is also the former guitarist of bands Ceremonial Oath (also being the founder), Cemetary, Lacuna Coil, as well as a co-founder and former session musician for In Flames. He did photography on the albums A Moonclad Reflection and Yesterworlds by Dark Tranquillity.

== Discography ==
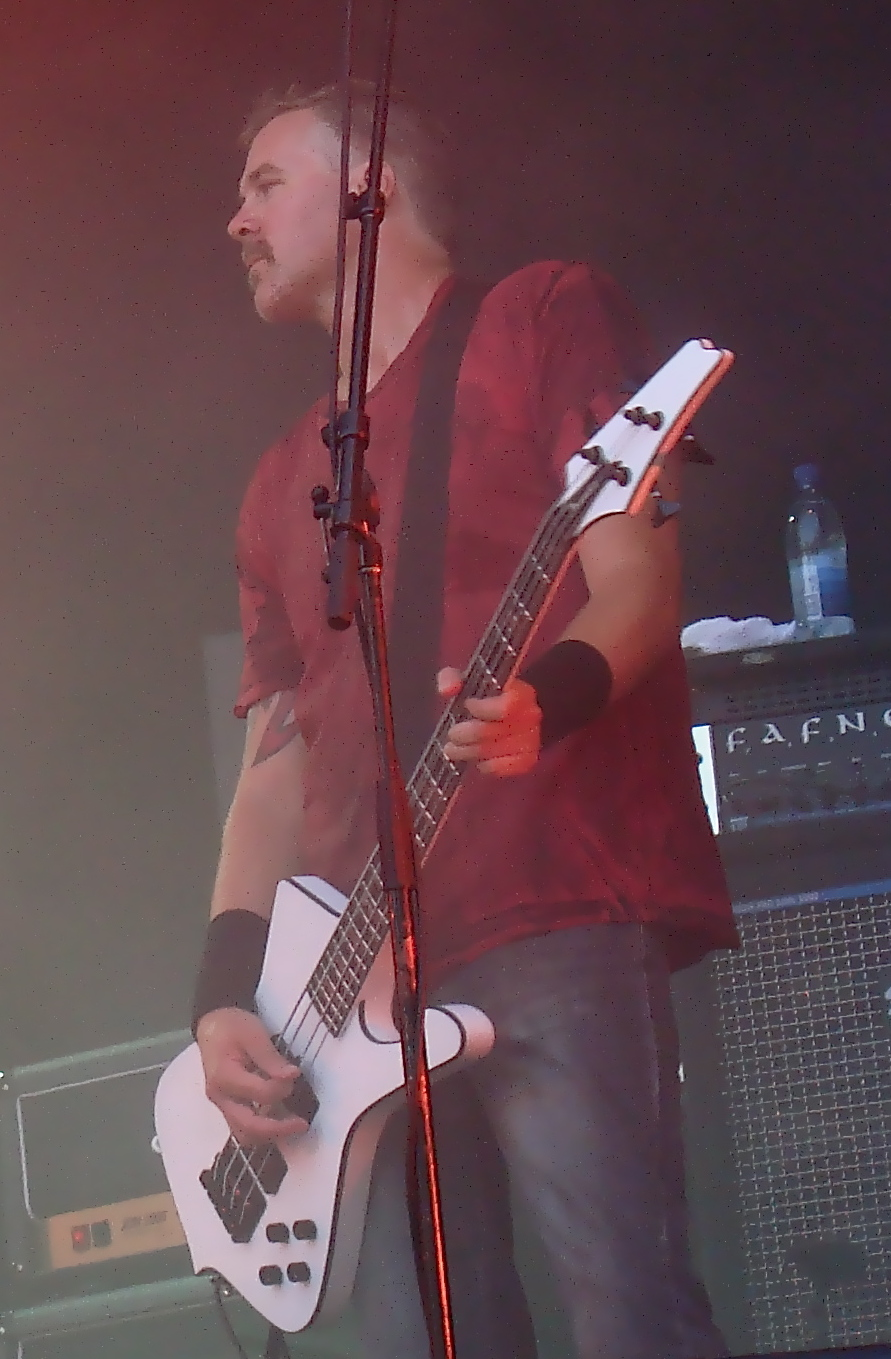
Iwers in 2009

=== Ceremonial Oath ===
- Wake the Dead (1990) – demo under Desecrator moniker
- Black Sermons (1990) – demo under Desecrator moniker
- Promo 1991 (1991) Demo
- Lost Name of God (1992)
- The Book of Truth (1993)
- Carpet (1995)

=== Cemetary ===
- Black Vanity (1994)
- Sundown (1996)

=== Tiamat ===
- A Deeper Kind of Slumber (1997)
- For Her Pleasure (1999)
- Skeleton Skeletron (1999)
- Judas Christ (2002)
- Prey (2003)
- Amanethes (2008)
- The Scarred People (2012)

=== Dark Tranquility ===
- Atoma (2016)
- Moment (2020)

=== In Flames ===
- Lunar Strain (1994) – guest soloist on tracks "In Flames" and "Upon an Oaken Throne"; guitars on 1993 demo tracks

=== The Awesome Machine ===
- Under the Influence (2002) – guest soloist on "Kick"

=== Rickshaw ===
- Double Deluxe (2001) – guest soloist on "Life in Hypercolor"

=== Avatarium ===
- All I Want (2014) – bassist on live songs
- The Girl With The Raven Mask (2015) – bassist on songs "Hypnotized", "Ghostlight" and "The Master Thief"
