= Lucyfire =

Musical project of Johan Edlund

- Origin: Germany
- Genre: Gothic rock
- Years active: 2000–2010
- Label: SPV GmbH
- Members: Johan Edlund; Dirk Draeger; Mark Engelmann; Jan Kazda; Bertram Engel
- Website: Lucyfire at SPV

Lucyfire is a musical project of Johan Edlund, the main member and vocalist of the band Tiamat. The original Tiamat band, as Edlund points out, will go on, and Lucyfire is the place for all the tracks that don't suit Tiamat.

Lucyfire's only album so far, This Dollar Saved My Life At Whitehorse, is contrary to Tiamat's style, being mostly straightforward rock music with lyrics about the frequently quoted subject matter of wine, women and song.

After releasing two new demo songs in early 2010 and looking to release their second album later in the year, Johan Edlund decided to disband Lucyfire for the foreseeable future. One of the demo songs, titled "Thunder and Lightning", was included on the latest Tiamat album, The Scarred People.

== Line-up ==
- Johan Edlund - vocals
- Dirk Draeger - guitars
- Mark Engelmann - keyboards
- Jan Kazda - bass guitar
- Bertram Engel - drums

== Discography ==
- This Dollar Saved My Life At Whitehorse (2001)
