= Mr. Death (band) =

Swedish death metal band

- Origin: Stockholm, Sweden
- Genre: Death metal
- Years active: 2007–present
- Label: Agonia Records
- Members: Jocke Lindström; Juck Thullberg; Jonas Ohlsson; Staffan Skoglund; Stefan Lagergren
- Past members: Alex Stjernfeldt
- Website: mrdeathmetal.com

Mr. Death is a death metal band that was formed in Stockholm, Sweden in 2007. The band features members from Treblinka, Tiamat and Expulsion who all felt that it was time to return to their roots after being away from the genre for up to twenty years.

Up until 2011, they have released two full-length albums, one EP and one single.

== Biography ==
Mr. Death began in early 2007 with Juck Thullberg, Alex Stjernfeldt and Jonas Ohlsson. They rehearsed and shaped their sound. In the summer of 2007, Jocke Lindström joined the band as vocalist. But it was not until February 2008 the line-up was completed with Stefan Lagergren. Treblinka made a reunion show for the book Swedish Death Metal and Juck and Stefan met again for the first time in many years. After the show Stefan was asked to join Mr. Death and he accepted.

With a complete line-up and newly written songs, Mr. Death went to Sunlight Studio to record their first demo, named Unearthing. They launched it on MySpace and within days after the release, different labels approached the band. After signing with the Polish label Agonia Records they started to write for their first full-length album. In December 2008 they once again entered Sunlight Studio with producer Tomas Skogsberg and recorded Detached From Life.

In 2009 Mr. Death did a studio test which ended up as their first EP. Death Suits You was recorded over a couple of weeks at Sunlight Studio, Studio Eastman and The House by the Cemetery. It was mixed by Fred Estby from Dismember.

2010 was a year of releases for Mr. Death as both Death Suits and a remastered version of Unearthing was released. Meanwhile, the band wrote new material for their follow up to Detached From Life. In December 2010 they entered the studio with producer Karl Daniel Lidén. Mr. Death wanted a raw and live-like feel to their new album, therefore they chose Daniel, famous for his work with Dozer and Switchblade. Descending Through Ashes was recorded between December 2010 and January 2011 at Gröndal Studio and Studio Riddarborgen. It was released on September 25, 2011.

== Members ==
- Jocke Lindström – vocals (ex-Digression Assassins)
- Stefan Lagergren – Guitar (ex-Treblinka, Tiamat, Expulsion)
- Staffan Skoglund – Guitar
- Juck Thullberg – Bass (ex-Treblinka, Tiamat)
- Jonas Ohlsson – Drums

== Past members ==
- Alex Stjernfeldt – Guitar 2007–2012

== Discography ==
- Unearthing (demo, March 26, 2008)
- Detached From Life (album, October 31, 2009)
- Death Suits You (EP, September 24, 2010)
- Descending Through Ashes (album, September 25, 2011)
- Deus Inferno (EP, February 8, 2014)
