= A Deeper Kind of Slumber =

Studio album by Tiamat
- Released: 22 April 1997
- Recorded: January–March 1997
- Genre: Psychedelic rock, gothic rock, post-punk
- Length: 59:57
- Label: Century Media
- Producer: Dirk Draeger, Johan Edlund

Tiamat chronology
Wildhoney (1994)	A Deeper Kind of Slumber (1997)	Skeleton Skeletron (1999)

Singles from A Deeper Kind of Slumber
- 1. "Cold Seed" Released: 1997

A Deeper Kind of Slumber is the fifth studio album from Swedish band Tiamat. Featuring female background vocals by Birgit Zacher (Moonspell, Angel Dust) and experimentation with a variety of influences, the album marked the group's first complete withdrawal from both death metal and conventional heavy metal, following their 1994 release, Wildhoney. It was also the first production after their relocation to Germany, and was written almost entirely by founder/lead songwriter Johan Edlund. Much of the music had reflected on Edlund's personal relationship with drugs, creative differences within the band as well as an interpersonal relationship.

== Track listing ==
No.	Title	Length
1.	"Cold Seed"	3:52
2.	"Teonanacatl"	4:17
3.	"Trillion Zillion Centipedes"	1:29
4.	"The Desolate One"	3:44
5.	"Atlantis as a Lover"	5:28
6.	"Alteration X 10"	5:09
7.	"Four Leary Biscuits"	4:03
8.	"Only in My Tears it Lasts"	4:48
9.	"The Whores of Babylon"	3:52
10.	"Kite"	2:04
11.	"Phantasma De Luxe"	4:58
12.	"Mount Marilyn"	10:33
13.	"A Deeper Kind of Slumber"	5:47
Total length:		59:57

Japanese edition bonus tracks
No.	Title	Length
14.	"Only In My Tears It Lasts (The Cat Mix)"	5:25
15.	"Three Leary Biscuits"	4:15
Total length:		69:39

== Credits ==
=== Tiamat ===
- Johan Edlund – vocals, rhythm guitar, keyboards, theremin, co-production
- Thomas Petersson – electric and acoustic guitars
- Anders Iwers – bass
- Lars Sköld – drums

=== Additional personnel ===
- The Inchtabokatables – violin, cello
- Sami Yli-Sirniö – sitar
- Ertugrul Coruk – flute
- Anke Eilhardt – Oboe
- Birgit Zacher – additional vocals
- Dirk Draeger – keyboards, engineering, production
- Siggi Bemm – engineering, mixing, mastering

== Charts ==
Chart (1997)	Peak position
Swedish Albums Chart	39
