= Clouds (Tiamat album) =

Studio album by Tiamat
- Released: 2 December 1992
- Genre: Death-doom; gothic metal
- Length: 39:29
- Label: Century Media
- Producer: Waldemar Sorychta

Tiamat chronology
The Astral Sleep (1991)	Clouds (1992)	Wildhoney (1994)

Clouds is the third full-length album by Swedish metal band Tiamat, released in 1992 through Century Media Records. It continues the extreme sound of previous albums with more melodic, gothic rock-inspired elements, including occasional clean singing, while retaining extremely heavy instrumentation and Johan Edlund's death growl.

== Track listing ==
Professional ratings
Review scores
Source	Rating
AllMusic	4/5 stars

All lyrics are written by Johan Edlund, except where noted.

No.	Title	Lyrics	Music	Length
1.	"In a Dream"		Edlund, Ekstrand, Petersson	5:12
2.	"Clouds"		Petersson, Ekstrand, Edlund	3:40
3.	"Smell of Incense"		Edlund, Petersson	4:29
4.	"A Caress of Stars"	Edlund, Hannah Stjarnvind	Petersson, Edlund	5:26
5.	"The Sleeping Beauty"		Hagel, Edlund	4:10
6.	"Forever Burning Flames"		Ekstrand, Peterson	4:22
7.	"The Scapegoat"		Ekstrand, Petersson, Edlund, Wilru	4:56
8.	"Undressed"		Edlund, Petersson	7:10
Total length:				39:29

== Personnel ==
- Johan Edlund – vocal, rhythm guitar, acoustic guitar
- Thomas Petersson – guitars, acoustic guitar
- Johnny Hagel – bass
- Kenneth Roos – keyboards
- Niklas Ekstrand – drums
- Jonas Malmsten – additional keyboards
- Rex Wilru – sitar ("The Scapegoat")

== Covers ==
German gothic metal band The Vision Bleak covered "The Sleeping Beauty" on their 2016 EP The Kindred of the Sunset.
