= Sumerian Cry =

Studio album by Tiamat
- Released: 7 June 1990
- Recorded: 14–29 October 1989
- Studio: Sunlight Studio, Stockholm
- Genre: Death metal, death-doom, black metal
- Length: 43:59
- Label: CMFT Productions
- Producer: Tiamat with Tomas Skogsberg

Tiamat chronology
Severe Abomination (1989)	Sumerian Cry (1990)	The Astral Sleep (1991)

Alternate cover
- 1997 digipak reissue edition

Professional ratings
Review scores
Source	Rating
AllMusic	2.5/5 stars

Sumerian Cry is the debut studio album from the Swedish metal band Tiamat.

It was recorded at Sunlight Studio in Stockholm in 1989, when the band was known under the original name Treblinka. The track "Sumerian Cry, Pt. 1" is a re-interpretation of the intro melody from "Crawling in Vomit", the first track off Treblinka's first demo. The track "The Sign of the Pentagram" is exclusive to the CD version of the album, and was not recorded at the same time as the rest of the album. This particular track was intended to be included on a compilation-CD released by Jon "Metalion" Kristiansen (editor of Norwegian metal fanzine Slayer). The CD was never released, and the track was included as a bonus track on this album.

"Where the Serpents Ever Dwell" was later covered by black metal band The Ruins of Beverast on the vinyl edition of their album Foulest Semen of a Sheltered Elite.

== Track listing ==
Sumerian Cry
No.	Title	Length
1.	"Intro – Sumerian Cry (Part 1)"	0:57
2.	"In the Shrines of the Kingly Dead"	4:09
3.	"The Malicious Paradise"	4:28
4.	"Necrophagious Shadows"	4:35
5.	"Apothesis of Morbidity"	6:05
6.	"Nocturnal Funeral"	4:05
7.	"Altar Flame"	4:30
8.	"Evilized"	5:00
9.	"Where the Serpents Ever Dwell/Outro – Sumerian Cry (Part 2)"	6:08
Total length:		39:38

CD and vinyl reissues bonus track
No.	Title	Length
10.	"The Sign of the Pentagram"	3:54
Total length:		43:57

== Personnel ==
- Johan Edlund (as Hellslaughter) – rhythm and lead guitars, keyboards, lead vocals
- Jörgen Thullberg (as Juck) – bass
- Stefan Lagergren (as Emetic) – lead and rhythm guitars
- Anders Holmberg (as Najse) – drums

Only photos of Hellslaughter and Juck are shown on the backcover, because Emetic and Najse were ex-members when the record came out.
