= Dr. Death =

Dr. Death may refer to:

== People ==
=== Doctors ===
- Wouter Basson (born 1950), South African cardiologist and former head of the country's secret chemical and biological warfare project during the apartheid era
- Christopher Duntsch (born 1971), American neurosurgeon convicted of aggravated assault for harmful surgeries he performed
- Aribert Heim (1914–1992), Austrian doctor and one of the world's most wanted Nazi war criminals
- Jack Kevorkian (1928–2011), American physician who assisted terminally ill people to commit suicide during the 1990s
- Josef Mengele (1911–1979), German doctor and infamous Nazi war criminal
- Philip Nitschke (born 1947), Australian physician who campaigned for legal assisted suicide and subsequently assisted four people in doing so
- Jayant Patel (born 1950), Indian-born American surgeon and convicted criminal who was accused of gross negligence whilst working at Bundaberg Hospital in Queensland, Australia
- Maxim Petrov (born 1965), Russian doctor and serial killer
- Porntip Rojanasunan (born 1955), Thai forensic pathologist
- Harold Shipman (1946–2004), British general practitioner and most prolific serial killer in British history
- Michael Swango (born 1954), American physician and serial killer
- Ulana Suprun (born 1963), Ukrainian-American physician, dubbed so for her unpopular medical reforms in Ukraine
- Gunther von Hagens (1945-2026), German anatomist who has a collection of dead bodies
- Santosh Pol (born 1974), Indian quack doctor and serial killer from Dhom, Satara, Maharashtra, fl. 2003–2016

=== Sports ===
- Oscar Edwards (born c. 1953/1954), American football player and businessman
- Dave Fennell (born 1952), Canadian football player
- Paul Lincoln (1932–2011), Australian professional wrestler
- Skip Thomas (1950–2011), American football player
- Steve Williams (wrestler) (1960–2009), American professional wrestler

=== Other people ===
- James Grigson (1932–2004), American psychiatrist who testified in more than 100 trials that resulted in death sentences
- Evan Harris (born 1965), British politician referred to as Dr Death for his views on abortion and euthanasia
- Fred A. Leuchter (born 1943), American Holocaust denier and manufacturer of execution equipment
- Gerard Steenson (1957–1987), a North Irish leader of the paramilitary Irish People's Liberation Organisation
- Charles Cullen (born 1960), American nurse who murdered at least 29, possibly hundreds, of patients across the state of New Jersey
- Josh Silver (born 1962), American keyboard player for band Type O negative

== Arts and entertainment ==
- Doctor Death (character), a DC Comics supervillain
- Doctor Death (magazine), a pulp magazine in 1934–35 featuring a villainous character of that name
- "Dr. Death," a character played by Vincent Price in the 1974 horror film Madhouse
- Leslie "Dr. Death" Krunchner, a character in the HBO sitcom 1st & Ten
- "Doctor Death," a fictional movie character played by Wesley Snipes in The Expendables 3
- Dr. Death, a living marionette in the horror film Retro Puppet Master
- Doctor Death: Seeker of Souls, a 1973 horror film
- Dr. Death (1945 TV series), a 1945 television mini-series
- Dr. Death (podcast), a podcast series produced by Wondery that tells the stories of various doctors
- Dr. Death (2021 TV series), an American crime drama television limited series, based on the podcast
- "Dr Death" (Murder in Successville), a 2015 television episode
- Dr. Death, a 2000 novel by Jonathan Kellerman

== See also ==
- Mr Death (disambiguation)
- Mr. Death: The Rise and Fall of Fred A. Leuchter, Jr., a 1999 documentary film by Errol Morris on the subject of Holocaust denial
