= The Astral Sleep =

Studio album by Tiamat
- Released: 1 September 1991
- Genre: Death-doom; blackened death metal; gothic metal
- Length: 48:38
- Label: Century Media
- Producer: Waldemar Sorychta

Tiamat chronology
Sumerian Cry (1990)	The Astral Sleep (1991)	Clouds (1992)

Professional ratings
Review scores
Source	Rating
AllMusic	4/5 stars

The Astral Sleep is the second studio album by Swedish metal band Tiamat. Released in 1991, it marks their debut on longtime label Century Media Records. It was reissued in 2006 with two tracks from the A Winter Shadow single, released in 1990.

Musically, this album blends the death metal style of Tiamat's debut album with gothic metal elements. Lyrically, it features a mixture of Satanism with introspective and esoteric themes.

== Track listing ==
The Astral Sleep
No.	Title	Length
1.	"Neo Aeon (Intro)"	2:09
2.	"Lady Temptress"	3:44
3.	"Mountain of Doom"	4:36
4.	"Dead Boys' Quire"	1:53
5.	"Sumerian Cry (Part III)"	5:15
6.	"On Golden Wings"	5:00
7.	"Ancient Entity"	6:15
8.	"The Southernmost Voyage"	3:12
9.	"Angels Far Beyond"	4:41
10.	"I Am the King (of Dreams)"	4:33
11.	"A Winter Shadow"	5:25
12.	"The Seal (Outro)"	1:52
Total length:		48:38

2006 re-issue bonus tracks
No.	Title	Length
13.	"A Winter Shadow" (Demo)	5:26
14.	"Ancient Entity" (Demo)	5:56
Total length:		60:00

Notes

- Bonus tracks are taken from the A Winter Shadow EP (1990 CBR Records).
- In the lyric sheet, track 4 is titled "Dead Boys' Choir" and track 10 "I Am the King (...of Dreams)".

== Personnel ==
- Johan Edlund – vocals, keyboards, rhythm guitar
- Thomas Petersson – lead guitar, acoustic guitar
- Jörgen Thullberg – bass
- Niklas Ekstrand – drums

All keyboards on this album by Jonas Malmsten. Additional guitar solo on "Ancient Entity" by Waldemar Sorychta.
