= Wildhoney (album) =

Studio album by Tiamat
- Released: September 1, 1994
- Recorded: July 1994
- Studio: Woodhouse
- Genre: Gothic metal, gothic rock, death-doom
- Length: 42:08
- Label: Century Media
- Producer: Waldemar Sorychta

Tiamat chronology
Clouds (1992)	Wildhoney (1994)	A Deeper Kind of Slumber (1997)

Wildhoney is the fourth studio album from Swedish music group Tiamat. The album was produced by Waldemar Sorychta and released by Century Media records in 1994. Vocalist Johan Edlund and John Hagel were the only two remaining members of Tiamat who were still with the group after their previous album Clouds in 1992. The album was marked a strong change in the style of Tiamat's music with more progressive and psychedelic-influenced music and a less death metal-oriented style. The music on the album deals with the occult, nature, and LSD. Music videos were made for the tracks "Whatever That Hurts" and "Gaia".

The album was released on September 1, 1994, and was one of the highest-selling records for Century Media on its release. AllMusic praised the album, referring to it as "one of the classics of the genre".

== Production ==
Tiamat vocalist Johan Edlund was unhappy with the recording of the album Clouds, stating that it "definitely didn't turn out the way I wanted it to". After the release of their 1994 tour EP, The Sleeping Beauty (Live in Israel), Edlund fired all members of Tiamat except for John Hagel. In 1994, Tiamat began working on an album that would become Wildhoney with session musicians Magnus Sahlgren, Lars Sköld, and Waldemar Sorychta who acted as keyboardist and producer. Edlund later stated that on Wildhoney that he "really did what I wanted to do on Clouds". The bird songs on the album were from a sound effects album Edlund had. The album was recorded at Woodhouse Studio.

== Style ==
Wildhoney was a move away from the death metal sound that was previously heard on their last album Clouds. Wildhoney has been described as their first album where the "psychedelic/progressive influences were more widespread". Edlund looked back on the album later, stating that he was "just a very young guy [who] wanted to sound like his favorite band, Pink Floyd". In 2007, Edlund stated that the themes of the album revolved around the pentagram ("The Ar"), nature ("Gaia"), LSD ("A Pocket Size Sun") and satanism ("Visionaire").

Regarding the somewhat controversial lyrics on "The Ar", including the mention of "the sign of the Aryan race" therein, Edlund have stated that: "The symbol was called like this by the people who lived some 5000 years ago in the place now called Iraq. I didn't want to censor myself, because I knew that this could be understood wrongly, now, in this century, but I thought that's not what I'm writing about, so even if people get it wrong, I'd better explain it and stand for it".

== Release ==
Wildhoney was released on September 1, 1994, by Century Media Records. Wildhoney was a very successful album for Century Media. The album sold better than the previous best sellers on the label; Grave and Unleashed. The album was re-released to include the Gaia EP with it in 2001 by Century Media.

== Reception ==
Professional ratings
Review scores
Source	Rating
AllMusic	4.5/5 stars

Critic Eduardo Rivadavia of Online music database AllMusic gave the album a rating of four and a half stars out of five, stating that the album "elevated the group's combination of lingering death metal roots and ambient soundscapes to unparalleled heights of invention". AllMusic gave five stars to the reissue that included the Gaia EP, referring to the album as "one of the classics of the genre".

== Track listing ==
All lyrics are written by Johan Edlund.

Wildhoney
No.	Title	Music	Length
1.	"Wildhoney" (Instrumental)	Edlund; Johnny Hagel	0:52
2.	"Whatever That Hurts"	Edlund	5:47
3.	"The Ar"	Hagel; Waldemar Sorychta	5:03
4.	"25th Floor" (Instrumental)	Edlund; Sorychta	1:49
5.	"Gaia"	Hagel	6:26
6.	"Visionaire"	Thomas Petersson; Edlund	4:19
7.	"Kaleidoscope" (Instrumental)	Edlund	1:19
8.	"Do You Dream of Me?"	Sorychta; Edlund	5:06
9.	"Planets" (Instrumental)	Edlund; Magnus Sahlgren	3:13
10.	"A Pocket Size Sun"	Edlund	8:04
Total length:			42:08

== Personnel ==
Per the liner notes.

- Johan Edlund – vocals, rhythm guitar
- John Hagel – bass
- Magnus Sahlgren – session lead guitar
- Lars Sköld – session drums
- Waldemar Sorychta – keyboards, production, engineering
- Birgit Zacher – additional vocals
- Siggi Bemm – audio engineer
- Carsten Drescher – layout
- Johan Edlund – photography
- Kristian Whalin – cover art and inlay paintings
- DMS - mastering

== See also ==
- 1994 in music
- Swedish popular music

== Notes ==
References

- Ekeroth, Daniel (2008). Swedish Death Metal. Bazillion Points Books. ISBN 978-0979616310.
- Wagner, Jeff (2010). Mean Deviation: Four Decades of Progressive Heavy Metal. Bazillion Points Books. ISBN 978-0979616334.
