= Amanethes =

Studio album by Tiamat
- Released: May 2, 2008
- Recorded: The Mansion, Studio Mega and Cue
- Genre: Gothic metal
- Length: 62:00; 67:00 (digipack edition)
- Label: Nuclear Blast
- Producer: Johan Edlund

Tiamat chronology
Prey (2003)	Amanethes (2008)	The Scarred People (2012)

Amanethes is the ninth studio album by Swedish gothic metal band Tiamat. It was released on May 2, 2008. The album was more positively received than Tiamat's previous releases, in part because of its return to their earlier more metallic sound.

== Track listing ==
Professional ratings
Review scores
Source	Rating
Allmusic	3.5/5 stars
Exclaim!	unfavorable
Release Magazine	6/10
Lollipop Magazine	(positive)

All tracks by Johan Edlund except "Amanes" (lyrics by J. Edlund, music by J. Edlund & A. Iwers)

1. "The Temple of the Crescent Moon" – 5:33
2. "Equinox of the Gods" – 4:35
3. "Until the Hellhounds Sleep Again" – 4:07
4. "Will They Come?" – 5:13
5. "Lucienne" – 4:41
6. "Summertime Is Gone" – 3:53
7. "Katarraktis apo Aima" – 2:43
8. "Raining Dead Angels" – 4:18
9. "Misantropolis" – 4:13
10. "Amanitis" – 3:21
11. "Meliae" – 6:11
12. "Via Dolorosa" – 4:05
13. "Circles" – 3:45
14. "Amanes" – 5:30
15. "Thirst Snake" (digipack bonus track) - 5:00

== Personnel ==
- Johan Edlund – vocals, electric & acoustic guitars, keys, bouzouki, percussion
- Thomas Wyreson - electric & acoustic guitars
- Anders Iwers – bass
- Lars Sköld – drums

Additional vocals by Ireth & Katerina Papageorgiou.

Backing vocals by Johan Edlund, Thomas Wyreson & Ireth.

Outro vocals on "Equinox of the Gods" by Leopold Ozzy Wyreson.

== Charts ==
Chart (2008)	Peak position
Swedish Albums Chart	13
