= Mr. Death =

Mr. Death or Mr Death may refer to:

- Personifications of death
- Mr. Death (Band)
- Fred A. Leuchter (born 1943), an author of forensic Holocaust denial material
- Dennis Allen (criminal) (1951–1987), Australian drug dealer
- Mr. Death: The Rise and Fall of Fred A. Leuchter, Jr.
- "Mr. Death", a Hugo Award-nominated short story by Alix E. Harrow

== See also ==
- Dr. Death (disambiguation)
