= Play the Game (American game show) =

US television program

- Presented by: Dr. Harvey Zorbaugh
- Country of origin: United States

Production
- Running time: 30 minutes
- Production company: American Broadcasting Company

Original release
- Network: DuMont (1946); ABC (1948)
- Release: September 24 – December 17, 1946

Play the Game, also known as Let's Play the Game, was one of the earliest game shows to be broadcast over an American television network, and the first known example of a television panel show. In 1941-42, CBS aired an early game show, CBS Television Quiz.

== Broadcast history ==
Play the Game was essentially a televised version of the parlor game charades. The show was hosted by Dr. Harvey Zorbaugh, professor of educational sociology at New York University. The show aired over the DuMont Television Network on Tuesdays from 8 to 8:30 pm ET from September 24, 1946, to December 17, 1946. The show also aired on ABC from August 20, 1948, to November 6, 1948, in primetime. A previous version of the program had been broadcast locally in New York City on WNBT Channel 1 (the predecessor to WNBC-TV) in 1941.

Although broadcast on DuMont, the program was actually produced by ABC in order to allow that network to develop experienced crews in anticipation of its own entry into television broadcasting; in this sense, it was the first ABC television series. WABC-TV Channel 7 subsequently broadcast later episodes of the program to the New York City market during 1948.

Celebrity panelists during the DuMont Network run included Willard Mullin, Alan Chidsey, Ireene Wicker, and Ray Knight. There were also audience participation segments during which viewers were invited to call in their guesses to the charades being presented.

== British Version ==
A British version (albeit as a pure panel game) aired on BBC-tv from 4 August 1947 to sometime in 1950, and was later adapted for children from 1951 to 1952. Hosts of this version included Cleland Finn, Sally Rogers, and Robert MacDermot.

== Episode status ==
As with most DuMont programs, no episodes of this show are known to exist in the UCLA Film and Television Archive or other collections. The status of the ABC version is unknown, but is likely also lost.

== See also ==
- List of programs broadcast by the DuMont Television Network
- List of surviving DuMont Television Network broadcasts
- 1946-47 United States network television schedule
- 1948-49 United States network television schedule
- On Stage, Everybody - ABC-produced TV series which aired on DuMont station WABD in 1945
- Let's Play Reporter - ABC-produced TV series which aired on DuMont station WABD in 1946

== Bibliography ==
- David Weinstein, The Forgotten Network: DuMont and the Birth of American Television (Philadelphia: Temple University Press, 2004) ISBN 1-59213-245-6
- Alex McNeil, Total Television, Fourth edition (New York: Penguin Books, 1980) ISBN 0-14-024916-8
- Tim Brooks and Earle Marsh, The Complete Directory to Prime Time Network and Cable TV Shows 1946–Present, Ninth edition (New York: Ballantine Books, 2007) ISBN 978-0-345-49773-4
