= Expulsion (band) =

Swedish death metal band

- Origin: Vallentuna, Sweden
- Genres: Death metal, death-doom
- Years active: 1988–1999
- Labels: Godhead, Dödsmetallfirma Expulsion
- Past members: Anders Holmberg; Stefan Lagergren; Calle Fransson; Fredrik Thörnqvist; Chelsea Krook; Chris Vowden

Expulsion was a death metal band from Vallentuna, Sweden, active from 1988 to 1999. The band was notable as one of the earliest Swedish death metal bands. Two of its members played in black metal band Treblinka, later known as Tiamat.

== History ==
In 1988, thrash metal band River's Edge split up when lead vocalist Johan Edlund left to form Treblinka. Stefan Lagergren (guitar), Anders Holmberg (bass) and Calle Fransson (drums) continued to play together as Expulsion and recorded two demo cassettes, Cerebral Cessation (1988) and Veiled in the Mists of Mystery (1989).

The band went on hold when Holmberg joined Tranquility, and reformed in 1991 by Lagergren and Fransson after leaving Tiamat, together with singer Fredrik Thörnqvist and bassist Chelsea Krook. Holmberg returned and replaced Krook on the debut EP, A Bitter Twist of Fate, recorded and released independently under the record label alias Dödsmetallfirma Expulsion in 1993.

The debut album, Overflow, was released in 1994. This album featured guest vocals by Edlund on the track At The Madness End. The second album, Man Against, followed in 1996. Although never on any tour, the band played concerts with bands such as At The Gates, Grave, Tiamat, Dismember and Nihilist.

After ten years without any success, the band split up in 1998. For a brief period, the members switched vocalist from Thörnqvist to Andreas Jansson under the name Judge And Jury, but split up in 1999.

== Musical style ==
On the first two demos, Expulsion "sounded like a thrashier Treblinka", both bands containing Stefan Lagergren and Anders Holmberg and "sound[ing] pretty similar".

Expulsion have often cited the bands Xecutioner, Athetist and Sadus as prime inspirations to start a death metal band. The combination of these influences, and the slower, doomier, bands such as Candlemass and Paradise Lost formed the basis of Expulsion's sound.

== Members ==
- Stefan Lagergren - guitar (Treblinka, Tiamat, Mr. Death, Voldet)
- Anders Holmberg - bass (also vocals 1988–1991) (Treblinka, Tiamat, Tranquillity)
- Calle Fransson - drums (Stressfest)
- Fredrik Thörnqvst - vocals 1991–1998
- Chris Vowden - guitar 1992–1999 (Stressfest, Mouthpeace)

== Discography ==
=== Albums ===
- Overflow (1994, Godhead)
- Man Against (1996, Godhead)

=== EPs ===
- A Bitter Twist of Fate (1993, Dödsmetallfirma Expulsion)

=== Demo cassettes ===
- Cerebral Cessation (1988)
- Veiled in the Mists of Mystery (1989)

=== Compilation albums ===
- Certain Corpses Never Decay (2014, Vic Records)
