= Skeleton Skeletron =

Studio album by Tiamat
- Released: August 11, 1999
- Recorded: 1999
- Genre: Gothic rock; gothic metal
- Length: 45:15
- Label: Century Media Records
- Producer: Dirk Draeger and Johan Edlund

Tiamat chronology
A Deeper Kind of Slumber (1997)	Skeleton Skeletron (1999)	Judas Christ (2002)

Skeleton Skeletron is the sixth studio album from Swedish band Tiamat.

Following A Deeper Kind of Slumber, the band took a less ambiguous direction to their style, utilizing a gothic rock sound but with various atmospheric soundscapes/effects and female background vocals added in.

"Church of Tiamat" is also the name of the band's official website.

The end of the song "As Long as You Are Mine" includes a quote of the opening of French poet Jean de La Fontaine's fable Le Loup et l’Agneau (The Wolf and the Lamb). The end of the song "Lucy" contains a popular sample from the 1957 science-fiction film The Brain from Planet Arous.

Professional ratings
Review scores
Source	Rating
Release Magazine	8/10
Chronicles of Chaos	9/10
AllMusic	2.5/5 stars
Metal.de	5/10
Lollipop Magazine	(positive)

== Track listing ==
Skeleton Skeletron
No.	Title	Length
1.	"Church of Tiamat"	4:52
2.	"Brighter Than the Sun"	4:08
3.	"Dust Is Our Fare"	5:02
4.	"To Have and Have Not"	5:09
5.	"For Her Pleasure"	5:03
6.	"Diyala"	1:25
7.	"Sympathy for the Devil" (Rolling Stones cover)	5:20
8.	"Best Friend Money Can Buy"	4:35
9.	"As Long as You Are Mine"	4:40
10.	"Lucy"	5:17
Total length:		45:15

Japanese edition bonus track
No.	Title	Length
11.	"Children Of The Underworld"	4:51
Total length:		50:06

== Personnel ==
- Johan Edlund – vocals, guitar, keys, arrangements, author
- Anders Iwers – bass
- Lars Sköld – drums
- Stefan Gerbe – piano
- Nicole Bolley, Andrea Schwarz & Jessica Andree – additional vocals

== Charts ==
Chart (1999)	Peak position
Swedish Albums Chart	56
