= This Dollar Saved My Life at Whitehorse =

Studio album by Lucyfire
- Released: April 24, 2001
- Genre: Gothic rock
- Length: 45:05
- Label: Steamhammer/SPV
- Producer: Dirk Draeger

Professional ratings
Review scores
Source	Rating
Allmusic	3/5 stars

This Dollar Saved My Life at Whitehorse is the first studio album (and only album so far) by Swedish/German band Lucyfire. It was released in 2001 on Steamhammer/SPV.

== Track listing ==
1. "Baby Come On (She's A Devil Of A Woman)" - 4:08
2. "Thousand Million Dollars in the Fire" - 3:58
3. "Mistress of the Night" - 3:53
4. "Over & Out" - 3:57
5. "As Pure As S.I.N (Zi Nanna)" - 4:29
6. "Automatic" - 4:14
7. "Perfect Crime" - 3:55
8. "U Can Have All My Love 2nite" - 3:42
9. "Sharp Dressed Man" (ZZ Top cover) - 4:17
10. "Annabel Lee" - 4:19
11. "The Pain Song" - 4:36

All songs written by Johan Edlund, except Sharp Dressed Man, written by Gibbons, Hill, Beard.

== Personnel ==
- Johan Edlund - lead vocals (as printed in the booklet - "by Johan Edlund & Jack Daniels")
- Sille Lemke - backing vocals
- Dirk Draeger - guitars
- Jan Kazda - bass
- Bertram Engel - drums

Keys & Rocket Science by Dirk Draeger & Mark Engemann.

== Title ==
The album shares its title with a 1973 oil painting by Carl Barks which depicts Scrooge McDuck in his money bin telling a story to Huey, Dewey, Louie, and Donald Duck. The reference is to the Yukon town of Whitehorse and Scrooge's many adventures searching for gold in the region, as told in the story Back to the Klondike.
