= Judas Christ =

Studio album by Tiamat
- Released: April 30, 2002
- Genre: Gothic rock
- Length: 52:44
- Label: Century Media
- Producer: Lars Nissen

Tiamat chronology
Skeleton Skeletron (1999)	Judas Christ (2002)	Prey (2003)

Professional ratings
Review scores
Source	Rating
Metal.de	4/10
Blabbermouth	8/10

Judas Christ is the seventh studio album from gothic band Tiamat. The album embraced love themes and was less commercially successful.

== Track listing ==
All tracks are written by Johan Edlund, except where noted.

Spinae
No.	Title	Length
1.	"The Return of the Son of Nothing"	4:59
2.	"So Much for Suicide"	4:23
3.	"Vote for Love"	4:49
4.	"The Truth's for Sale"	4:40

Tropic of Venus
No.	Title	Music	Length
5.	"Fireflower"	Edlund; Lars Sköld	3:47
6.	"Sumer by Night"	Anders Iwers; Thomas Petersson; Edlund; Sköld	2:37
7.	"Love Is as Good as Soma"		6:42

Tropic of Capricorn
No.	Title	Lyrics	Music	Length
8.	"Angel Holograms"			3:38
9.	"Spine"	Iwers; Edlund; Lars Nissen	Edlund; Nissen	4:05
10.	"I Am in Love with Myself"			4:22

Casadores
No.	Title	Lyrics	Length
11.	"Heaven of High"		3:52
12.	"Too Far Gone"	Iwers; Edlund	4:49
Total length:			52:44

The Hamburg Tapes (Limited edition bonus tracks)
No.	Title	Length
13.	"Sixshooter"	4:10
14.	"However You Look at It You Lose"	4:08
Total length:		61:02

U.S. edition bonus track
No.	Title	Length
13.	"Cold Last Supper"	3:29
Total length:		56:13

== Personnel ==
Tiamat

- Johan Edlund – guitars, vocals, keyboards
- Thomas Petersson – guitars
- Anders Iwers – bass, additional guitars, backing vocals
- Lars Sköld – drums, percussion, backing vocals

Additional personnel

- Out of Phase – keys, programming, digeridoo
- Maska – violin, sitar, oud
- Trille Palsgaard – backing vocals
- Lars Nissen – keyboards, backing vocals, engineering, mixing, production

== Charts ==
=== Weekly ===
Chart (2002)	Peak position
Swedish Albums Chart	52

=== Monthly ===
Chart (2002)	Peak position
Poland (ZPAV Top 100)	39
