= Let's Play Reporter =

American television series

Let's Play Reporter is an early American television series. It was an experimental test program broadcast on May 23, May 30 and June 6, 1946.

Presumably intended to try out a new concept on television, it was produced by the American Broadcasting Company but aired on DuMont Television Network station WABD-TV.

Though only aired on a single station, it nevertheless represents an early example of television programming.

== Premise and reception ==
The June 1, 1946 edition of Billboard magazine describes the series as an "audience participation" program, hosted by Frances Scott. They said of the program "The American Broadcasting Company again tried to tele-convert a mike show for the camera - and did it not too badly. Why it did it at all is the question", referring to how a similar program had been presented the previous week on WCBW.

== Personnel ==
Frances Scott was the program's host, and Harvey Marlowe was the producer.

== Episode status ==
Methods to record live television series did not exist in 1946, and as such the series is most likely lost.

== See also ==
- Play the Game - Another ABC-produced show which aired on DuMont
- On Stage, Everybody - Another ABC-produced show which aired on DuMont
