= The Scarred People =

- Album cover by Johan Edlund

Studio album by Tiamat
- Released: November 2, 2012
- Recorded: Woodhouse Studios; Hagen, Germany
- Genre: Gothic metal, gothic rock
- Length: 67:56
- Label: Napalm Records
- Producer: Siggi Bemm

Tiamat chronology
Amanethes (2008)	The Scarred People (2012)

Professional ratings
Review scores
Source	Rating
Blistering	(7.5/10)
Metal Storm	(favorable)
Revolver	(3.5/5)

The Scarred People is the tenth studio album by Swedish gothic metal band Tiamat. The album was released on November 2, 2012 through Napalm Records in digital download, CD and limited edition vinyl formats.

== Track listing ==
All tracks written and composed by Tiamat except "Born to Die" by Elizabeth Woolridge Grant and Justin Parker, and "Paradise" by Bruce Springsteen.

1. The Scarred People - 6:38
2. Winter Dawn - 4:13
3. 384 - 4:25
4. Radiant Star - 3:45
5. The Sun Also Rises - 5:06
6. Before Another Wilbury Dies - 1:39
7. Love Terrorists - 5:42
8. Messinian Letter - 4:19
9. Thunder & Lightning - 4:32
10. Tiznit - 3:03
11. Born to Die - 4:42 (limited edition bonus track)
12. The Red of the Morning Sun - 4:21 (limited edition bonus track)
13. Paradise - 5:28 (limited edition bonus track)
14. Divided - 4:46 (limited edition live bonus track)
15. Cain - 5:18 (limited edition live bonus track)

"Divided" and "Cain" recorded live at Z7, Pratteln, Switzerland, 6th of Dec. 2010.

== Music videos ==
- The Scarred People produced by angst-im-wald.

== Personnel ==
Tiamat

- Johan Edlund - lead & backing vocals, rhythm guitar, keyboards
- Roger Öjersson - lead guitar, backing vocals, keyboards, mandolin
- Anders Iwers - bass, lead vocals on "Paradise"
- Lars Sköld - drums

Additional personnel

- Siggi Bemm - additional keyboards, additional backing vocals, arrangements
- Gus G. - guitar solo on "Thunder & Lightning"
- Ioanna Lampropoulou - additional vocals
- Katerina Kladisiou - additional screams
- David Mortimer-Hawkins - additional spoken word
- Matt Korr - additional spoken word

Production

- Siggi Bemm - production
