= Panel show =

Radio and TV genre

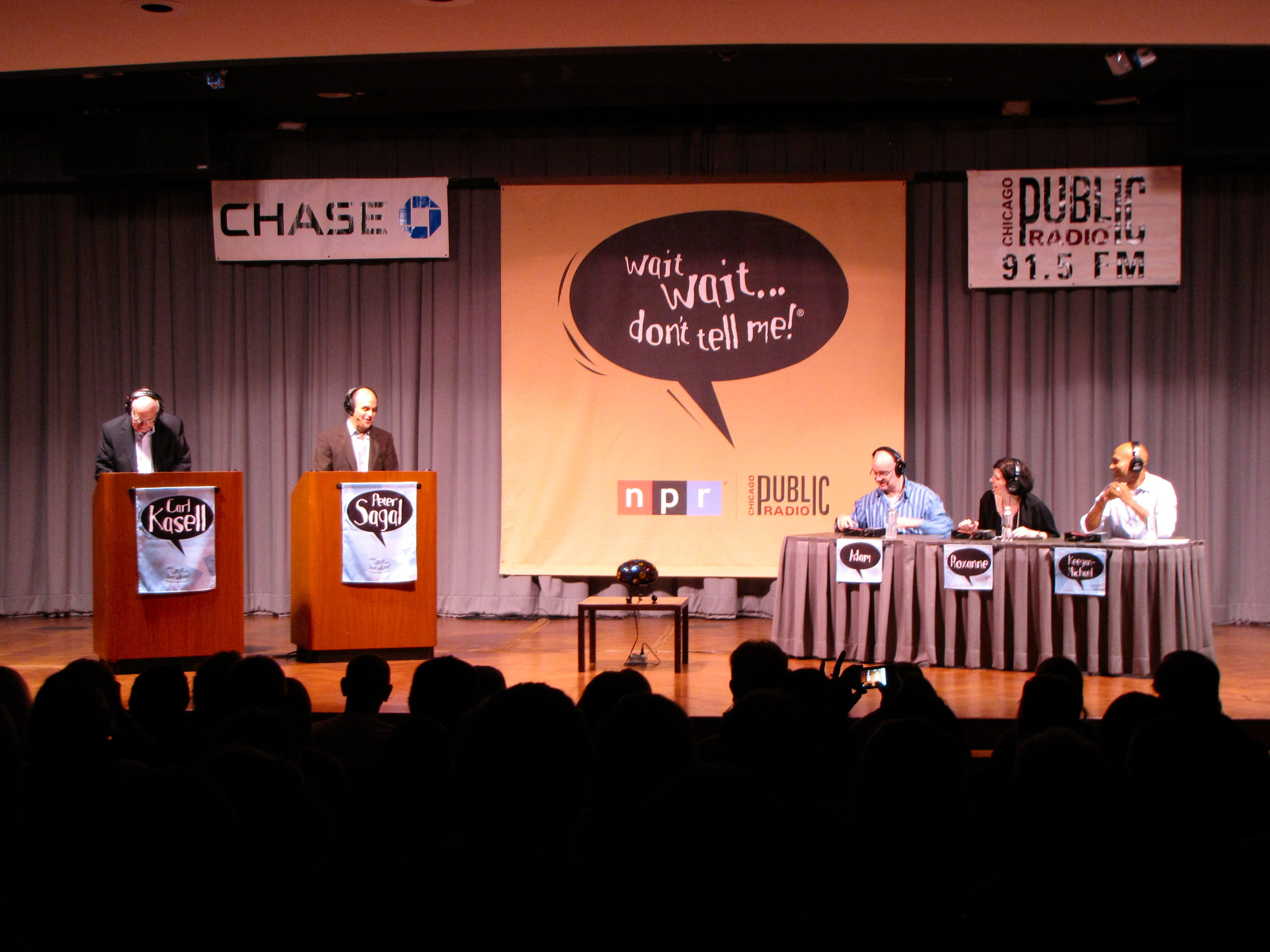
A recording of radio panel show Wait Wait... Don't Tell Me!, featuring, from left, announcer and scorekeeper Carl Kasell; host Peter Sagal; and panelists Adam Felber, Roxanne Roberts and Keegan-Michael Key before a live audience.

A panel show or panel game is a radio or television game show in which a panel of celebrities participate. Celebrity panelists may compete with each other, such as on The News Quiz; facilitate play by non-celebrity contestants, such as on Match Game and Blankety Blank; or do both, such as on Wait Wait Don't Tell Me. The genre can be traced to 1938, when Information Please debuted on American radio. The earliest known television panel show is Play the Game, a charades show in 1946. The modern trend of comedy panel shows can find early roots with Stop Me If You've Heard This One in 1939 and Can You Top This? in 1940. While panel shows were more popular in the past in the U.S., they are still very common in the United Kingdom.

== Format ==
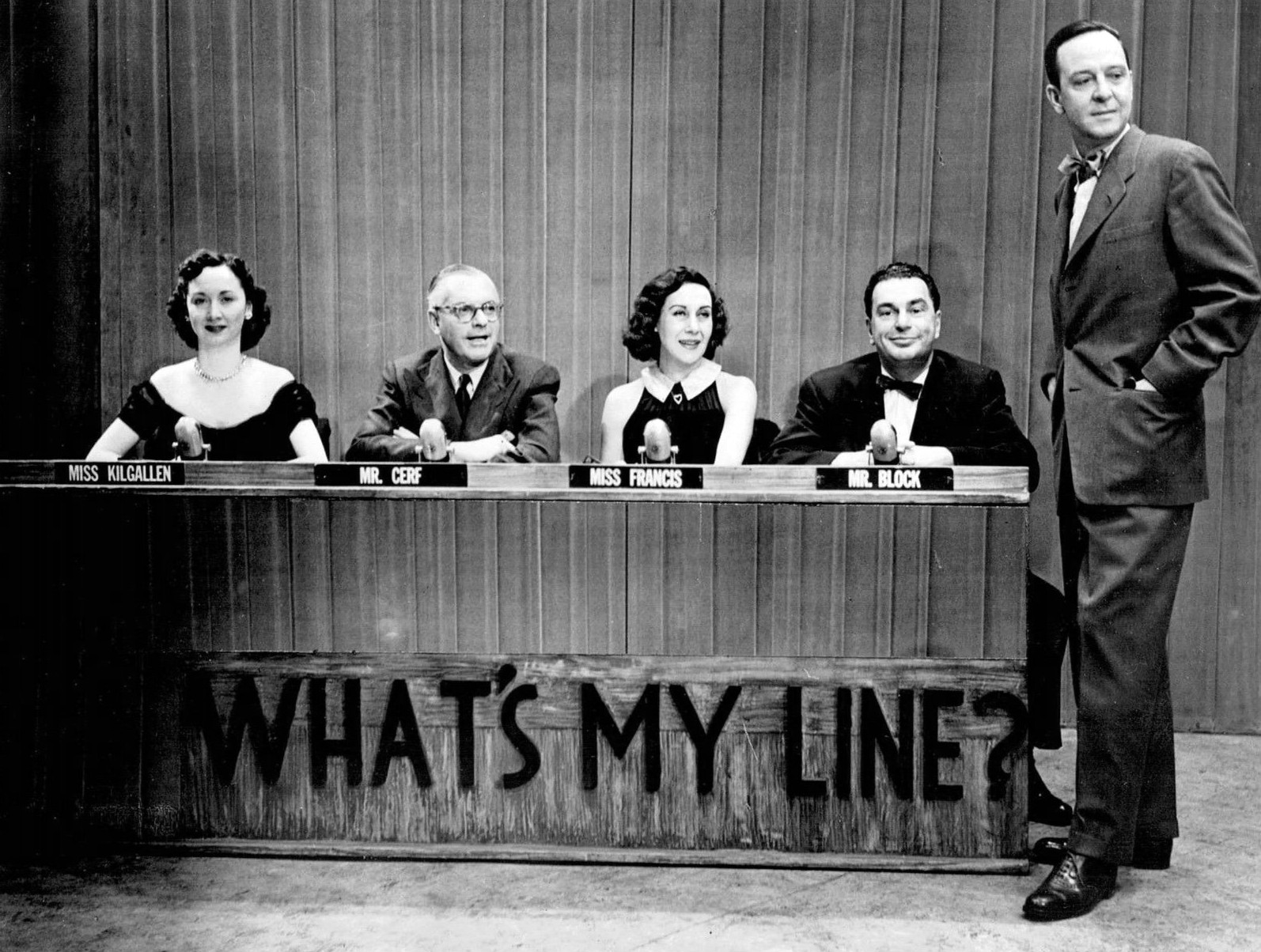
Panellists and host John Charles Daly on What's My Line?, in 1952

While many early panel shows stuck to the traditional quiz show format in which celebrities tried to get the right answers and win, the primary goal of modern panel shows is to entertain the audience with comedy, with the game or quiz structure providing subjects for the comedians to joke about. Panel shows also feature comedic banter, friendly ribbing and camaraderie among the panelists. Scoring is often deemphasised in panel shows. The American version of Whose Line Is It Anyway? acknowledged this with the introduction, "Welcome to Whose Line Is It Anyway, the show where everything's made up and the points don't matter." QI's opaque scoring system is purportedly a mystery even to its creator, I'm Sorry I Haven't A Clue dispenses with points altogether, and many other shows mention points only occasionally or at the end, instead of continuously displaying scores in front of players.

Panel shows can have any number of themes. Many are topical and satirical, such as Wait Wait... Don't Tell Me!, Have I Got News for You, The News Quiz and Mock the Week. 8 Out of 10 Cats is based on opinion polling; What's My Line? is about occupations; Never Mind the Buzzcocks and Face the Music center on music; A League of Their Own, A Question of Sport and They Think It's All Over are sports-themed; Was It Something I Said?, Quote... Unquote and Who Said That? feature quotations; My Word! involves wordplay; I've Got a Secret is about secrets; To Tell the Truth, Would I Lie to You? and The Unbelievable Truth deal with lies; and It Pays to Be Ignorant and I'm Sorry I Haven't a Clue are parodies.

Some panel shows are variations of classic parlor games. Twenty Questions is based on the parlor game of the same name, Give Us a Clue is modelled after charades, and Call My Bluff and Balderdash are based on fictionary.

Frequently, a panel show features recurring panelists or permanent team captains, and some panelists appear on multiple panel shows. Most shows are recorded before a studio audience.

== International production ==
=== United States ===
The first known example of a panel show in the world is the radio program Information Please, which debuted on 17 May 1938 on the NBC Blue Network. An evolution of the quiz show format, Information Please added the key element of a panel of celebrities, largely writers and intellectuals, but also actors and politicians. Listeners would mail in questions, winning prizes for stumping the panel.

American panel shows transferred to television early in the medium's history, with the first known example being Play the Game, a charades show that aired on DuMont and ABC beginning in 1946. The celebrity charades concept has been replicated numerous times since then. The most popular adaptation was Pantomime Quiz, airing from 1947 to 1959, and having runs on each of the four television networks operating at the time. Other charades shows have included Stump the Stars; Movietown, RSVP; Celebrity Charades; Showoffs and Body Language.

TV panel shows saw their peak of popularity in the 1950s and '60s, when CBS ran the three longest-running panel shows in prime time: What's My Line?, I've Got a Secret and To Tell the Truth. At times, they were among the top ten shows on American television, and they continue to experience occasional revivals. All three Goodson-Todman primetime shows were cancelled by CBS in 1967 amid ratings declines and trouble attracting younger viewers, although the programs were consistently profitable by being among the cheapest television shows to produce. Their cancellations came as attention to demographics and a focus on younger viewers gained currency among advertisers. The departures of these three New York–based shows were also part of a mass migration of television production to Los Angeles, leaving only one primetime show produced on the East Coast.

Later years saw several successes in the format, primarily running in the daytime and airing in their greatest numbers during the '70s and '80s. These panel shows marked a shift in the format: whereas CBS' primetime shows had panelists guessing secrets about the guests, these new shows featured civilian contestants either playing games in teams with celebrity partners (Password, Pyramid, Win, Lose or Draw), competing to predict how the panelists would respond to a comedic prompt (Match Game), or determining whether or not a panelist provided the correct answer to a question (The Hollywood Squares). Later, Nickelodeon premiered the youth-oriented panel game Figure it Out in 1997, the American version of Whose Line Is It Anyway? had a primetime run from 1998 to 2004 on ABC and a revival in 2013 by The CW, while Wait Wait... Don't Tell Me! has become a popular weekend show on NPR since 1998.

From 2002 to 2025, the sports channel ESPN broadcast Around the Horn as part of its daytime block of sports news and discussion shows. While presented as ostensibly being a roundtable debate show, the series did contain some game show-like elements; the panel of sports journalists earned points from the host based on the strength of their responses to specific topics (and could also mute panelists, if needed), with the lowest scorers eliminated at points throughout the show. The winner received 30 seconds at the end of the show to discuss any topic they wanted.

In 2015, ABC announced primetime revivals for Match Game, which ran from 2016 until 2021, and To Tell the Truth, which ran from 2016 to 2022. From 2013 to 2017, Comedy Central aired @midnight, an internet culture and social media-themed panel game which used a more quiz show-styled presentation—with the celebrity guests buzzing in to earn points from the host for punchlines and responses in various segments. In 2024, a reboot of the show, now titled After Midnight and hosted by Taylor Tomlinson, premiered on CBS.

The streaming service Dropout has received attention for many of its shows' similarities to panel shows, notably Game Changer—a comedy game show with differing objectives in each episode, and the panelists not being given any advance knowledge of what the exact objective will be.

=== United Kingdom ===
Panel shows are particularly popular in the United Kingdom, where they have found continued success since the BBC adapted its first radio panel shows from classic parlor games. Perhaps the earliest British panel show is the BBC radio adaptation of Twenty Questions, which debuted on 28 February 1947. Panel shows can have decades-long runs in the UK: Twenty Questions lasted until 1976, while Just a Minute has remained on the air, and had Nicholas Parsons as host from 1967 until 2019. Other long-running games on radio include I'm Sorry I Haven't a Clue since 1972, The News Quiz since 1977, My Word! from 1956 to 1988, and My Music from 1967 to 1994.

The British version of What's My Line? may have been the first television panel show in the UK, with an original run from 1951 to 1963 and several remakes in later years. The word game Call My Bluff aired from 1965 to 2005, the charades show Give Us a Clue ran from 1979 to 1992, and the improv game Whose Line Is It Anyway? aired from 1988 to 1998. Current British panel shows have become showcases for the nation's top stand-up and improv comedians, as well as career-making opportunities for new comedians. Regular comics on panel shows often go on to star in sitcoms and other TV shows.

The modern British panel show format of TV comedy quizzes started with Have I Got News for You, a loose adaptation of BBC Radio 4's The News Quiz. HIGNFY, as the show is sometimes known, began airing in 1990, and has been the most-viewed show of the night, regularly attracting as much as a 20% audience share. The show's success grew after its transfer from BBC Two to the flagship BBC One in 2000.

After HIGNFY's success, panel shows proliferated on British TV. Notable examples include QI on various BBC channels since 2003, Mock the Week on BBC Two from 2005 to 2022 and TLC from 2026, 8 Out of 10 Cats on Channel 4 from 2005 to 2021 and its spin off 8 Out of 10 Cats Does Countdown since 2012, Would I Lie to You? on BBC One since 2007, Taskmaster on Channel 4 since 2020, and the annual special, The Big Fat Quiz of the Year on Channel 4 since 2004.

On the radio, The News Quiz, Just a Minute, I'm Sorry I Haven't a Clue and The Unbelievable Truth are among the most popular and long-running panel shows, all of which air on BBC Radio 4.

British comedy panel shows feature mainly male guests. A 2016 study that analysed 4,700 episodes from 1967 to 2016 found that 1,488 of them had an all-male lineup, and only one an all-female cast. The proportion of women rose from 3% in 1989 to 31% in 2016.

=== Australia ===
Australian panel shows include advertising-focused The Gruen Transfer and its various spinoffs on ABC1 since 2008, the music quiz Spicks and Specks on ABC1 from 2005 to 2011 and again since 2014, news quiz Have You Been Paying Attention? on Network Ten since 2013, and tabloid quiz Dirty Laundry Live on ABC1 and ABC2 since 2013. News quiz Good News Week aired on ABC1 from 1996 to 1998 and on Network Ten from 1999-2000 and again from 2008 to 2012, sports quiz A League of Their Own aired on Network Ten in 2013, and pop culture quiz Tractor Monkeys aired on ABC1 in 2013.

=== New Zealand ===
Currently running New Zealand panel shows include the news quiz 7 Days since 2009, Have You Been Paying Attention? New Zealand since 2019, Taskmaster New Zealand since 2020, and Guy Montgomery's Guy Mont-Spelling Bee since 2023.

=== Canada ===
CBC Radio One currently broadcasts two long-running radio panel shows: The Debaters, which debuted in 2006, and Because News, which debuted in 2015.

In 2022, Noovo began broadcasting Le maître du jeu, a local French language adaptation of Taskmaster.

==== Former shows ====
In 2014, Super Channel ordered 36 episodes of a panel show called Too Much Information. A revival of Match Game aired on The Comedy Network from 2012 to 2014, the news quiz Front Page Challenge aired on CBC Television from 1957 to 1995, and the charades show Party Game aired in syndication from 1970 to 1981.

=== France ===
French panel shows include Vendredi tout est permis ("Friday, Everything Goes"), an improv game on TF1 since 2011. Earlier panel shows include Le Francophonissime, a linguistic game on ORTF and TF1 from 1969 to 1981; L'Académie des neuf ("The Academy of Nine"), based on Hollywood Squares on Antenne 2 from 1982 to 1987; Cluedo, based on the board game Cluedo/Clue on France 3 from 1994 to 1995; Burger Quiz on Canal + from 2001 to 2002; Incroyables Expériences ("Incredible Experiences"), about scientific experiments on France 2 and France 3 from 2008 to 2012; and Canapé quiz ("Sofa Quiz"), an adaptation of Hollywood Game Night on TMC in 2014.

=== Germany ===
German panel shows include 7 Tage, 7 Köpfe ("7 Days, 7 Heads"), Genial daneben ("Idiot Savant"), Kopfball ("Headball"), Die Montagsmaler ("Pictionary"), Noch Besserwissen ("Even Better Knowledge"), Pssst … (similar to I've Got A Secret), Die Pyramide (the German version of Pyramid), Quizfire, Sag die Wahrheit ("Tell the Truth", the German version of To Tell the Truth), Typisch Frau – Typisch Mann ("Typical Woman – Typical Man"), Was bin ich? ("What am I?", the German version of What's My Line?) and Was denkt Deutschland? ("What Does Germany Think?").

=== Japan ===
Early Japanese panel shows include 話の泉 ("Source of the Story"), based on Information Please on NHK Radio 1 from 1946 to 1964; 二十の扉 ("Twenty Doors"), based on Twenty Questions on NHK Radio 1 from 1947 to 1960; ジェスチャー ("Gestures"), a charades show on NHK General TV from 1953 to 1968; and 私の秘密 ("My Secret"), based on I've Got a Secret on NHK General TV from 1956 to 1967.

Currently, a wide variety of Japanese variety shows are popular, and many of them feature owarai comedians, Japanese idols, and other celebrities playing games.

Some games involve bizarre physical stunts. Brain Wall, adapted in English-speaking countries as Hole in the Wall, has comedians attempt to jump through oddly shaped holes in moving walls without falling into water, DERO and its successor TORE have celebrities solve mental and physical challenges to escape traps and hazards or presumably die trying, VS Arashi has a team of celebrities compete against J-pop group Arashi and their Plus One guest(s) in physical games, Nep League has various celebrity teams competing in various quizzes that test their combined brainpower in the fields of Japanese, English, General Knowledge, Etc., and AKBingo! similarly features members of pop group AKB48 and others competing in physical challenges and quizzes.

Other shows include 日本語探Qバラエティ クイズ!それマジ!?ニッポン ("Is it really!?"), a celebrity word game; くりぃむクイズ ミラクル9 ("Miracle 9"), a show somewhat similar to Hollywood Squares; Numer0n, a celebrity numbers game; and オールスター感謝祭 ("All Star Thanksgiving"), a semi-annual celebrity quiz. There are many other games featuring celebrities within Japan's variety genre.

Prime Minister Ōta is a show featuring many comedians and politicians debating fictional proposals in a sort of game show version of a legislative chamber.

== Examples ==
- Front Page Challenge
- Good News Week
- Hollywood Game Night
- Hollywood Squares
- It's News to Me
- I've Got a Secret
- Match Game
- Password
- Says You!
- Spicks and Specks
- The Debaters
- The Marriage Ref
- To Tell the Truth
- Wait Wait… Don't Tell Me!
- What's My Line?

== See also ==
- Panel discussion
