= Prey (Tiamat album) =

Studio album by Tiamat
- Released: October 27, 2003
- Genre: Gothic rock
- Length: 59:05
- Label: Century Media
- Producer: Johan Edlund

Tiamat chronology
Judas Christ (2002)	Prey (2003)	Amanethes (2008)

Prey is the eighth studio album by Swedish gothic rock band Tiamat. It was released on October 27, 2003, through Century Media Records.

The song "Cain" appeared in Troika Games' 2004 PC game Vampire: The Masquerade – Bloodlines.

== Track listing ==
Professional ratings
Review scores
Source	Rating
AllMusic	2/5 stars
Chronicles of Chaos	8/10
Release Magazine	8/10
Metal.de	7/10

All tracks are written by Johan Edlund, except where noted.

No.	Title	Lyrics	Length
1.	"Cain"		5:25
2.	"Ten Thousand Tentacles"		1:34
3.	"Wings of Heaven"		4:32
4.	"Love in Chains"		4:24
5.	"Divided"		5:18
6.	"Carry Your Cross and I'll Carry Mine"		4:37
7.	"Triple Cross"		1:21
8.	"Light in Extension"		4:47
9.	"Prey"		3:31
10.	"The Garden of Heathen"		1:25
11.	"Clovenhoof"		4:54
12.	"Nihil"		6:09
13.	"The Pentagram"	Aleister Crowley	7:20
Total length:			55:17

US edition bonus track
No.	Title	Writer(s)	Length
14.	"Sleeping (In the Fire)"	Blackie Lawless	3:47
Total length:			59:04

== Personnel ==
=== Tiamat ===
- Johan Edlund – vocals, guitars, keyboards
- Thomas Petersson – guitars
- Anders Iwers – bass guitar
- Lars Sköld – drums

=== Additional personnel ===
- Johan Edlund – engineering, production, design, layout
- Sonja Brandt – additional vocals ("Divided", "Carry Your Cross and I'll Carry Mine")
- Sam Carpenter – engineering
- T. T. Oksala – mixing
- Minerva Pappi – mastering
- Katja Kuhl – photography
