= On Stage, Everybody =

On Stage, Everybody is a United States television variety show that was produced by ABC, and aired on DuMont Television Network station WABD. Broadcast in 1945, it appears to have been one of several early television series produced for WABD so that ABC production crews could get experience in television program production, as ABC did not yet have a TV station of its own. The emcee on the series was Danton Walker. Notably, the Hall Johnson Choir made a guest appearance in one of the episodes. As methods to record live television did not exist until late 1947, none of the episodes still exist.

== Reception ==
Reviewing the second episode, Billboard magazine said "the show ran with a smoothness that is big-time".

Reviewing the third episode, Billboard said "The third televersion of On Stage, Everybody had faults, but for the most part they did not interfere with the quality of the presentation".

== See also ==
- Play the Game - Another ABC-produced series for DuMont
- Let's Play Reporter - ABC series produced for WABD
