= Television Quarterback =

American television program

Television Quarterback is an early American television program, which aired from 1945 to 1947 on New York City station WNBT. By October 1947, the program was also broadcast in Philadelphia, Schenectady, and Washington at 8 p.m. Eastern Time on Fridays.

The program featured Lou Little, however it is notable as an early example of a sports-themed television series. Methods to record live television did not exist at the time, and as such the series is now lost.

Little analyzed plays from films of games, and Bob Hall talked about significant games scheduled for the next day. Ernest Colling produced and directed the program. U. S. Rubber was the sponsor, paying $1,000 per episode.
