= Teletruth =

American children's TV series

Teletruth is an early United States television series. It is notable as an early example of a television game show for kids, though it was not a network series. It aired on New York City station WNBT from 1945 to either 1946 or 1947. It was originally hosted by Pat Barnes. Jay Marshall later took over the hosting job.

== Critical response ==
A September 2, 1945 review in the Louisville Courier Journal described the premise of the show, and concluded, "If this is the television programming the big brains are giving forth, cancel my order for a set, will you please?"

The October 20, 1945 edition of Billboard magazine gave the series a mixed review, saying of the series "Tele-truth, despite its corny name, is the first video quiz this department has seen so far which was 100 per cent visual and perhaps 85 per cent entertaining", but also said that "Teletruth could be improved considerably if a few things were done to it."

A later review in Billboard reported that a magician's hands were not fast enough, so that sometimes "it was obvious just what he was doing." The review also found fault with the camera work and noted that "questions must still be within the kid scope and plenty of them weren't this evening."

== Episode status ==
Practical/viable methods to record live television did not exist during the run of the series. As such, it is most likely lost today, except possibly for still photographs.
