= Tiamat (band) =

Swedish gothic metal band

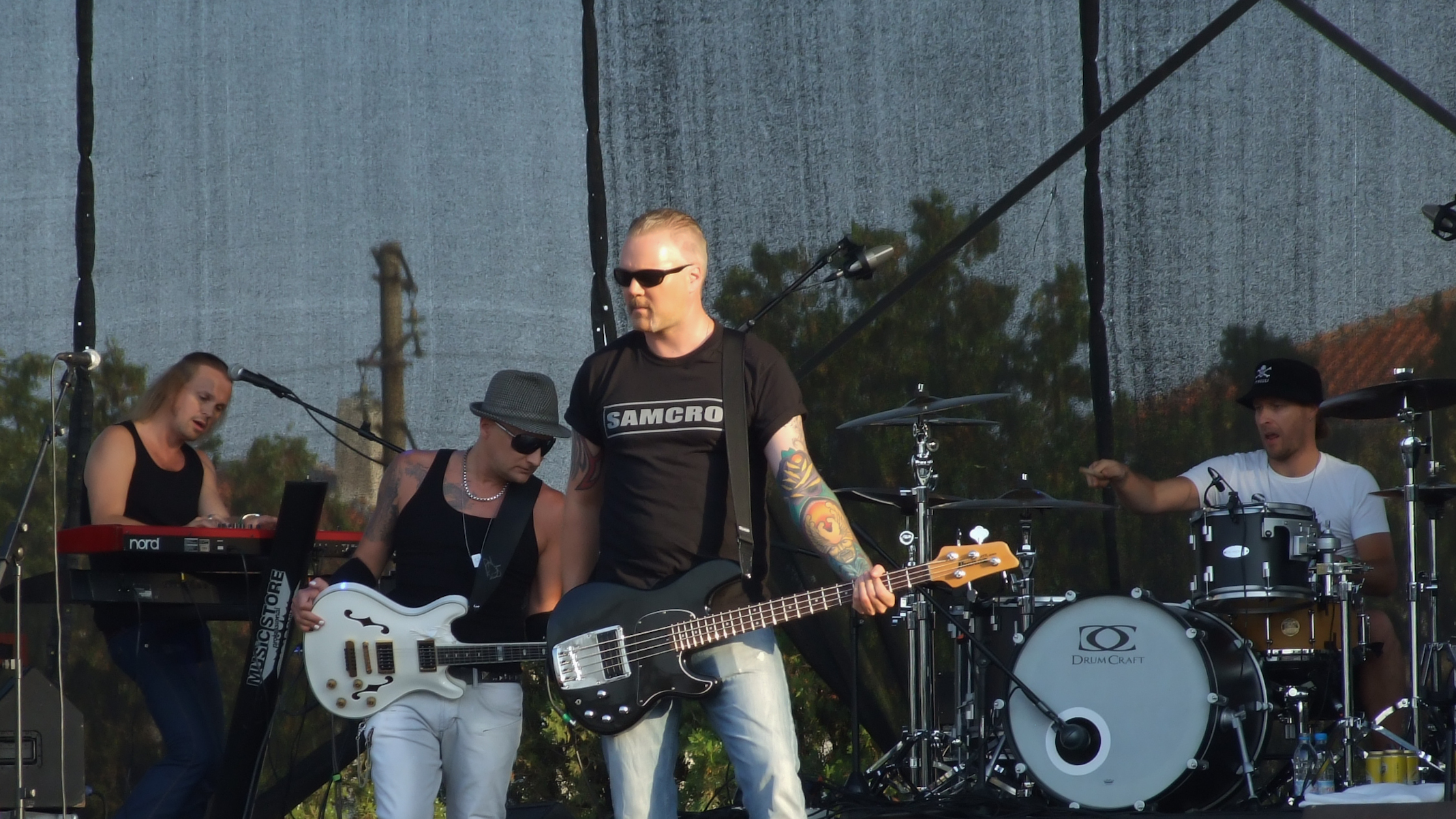
- Tiamat performing at Kavarna Rock Fest 2011

Background information
- Also known as: Treblinka (1987–1989)
- Origin: Täby, Stockholm, Sweden
- Genres: Gothic metal; gothic rock; death-doom (early); black metal (early)
- Years active: 1987–present
- Labels: Century Media, Nuclear Blast, Napalm
- Members: Johan Edlund; Lars Sköld; Gustaf Hielm; Simon Johansson; Per Wiberg
- Past members: Jörgen "Juck" Thullberg; Anders Holmberg; Stefan Lagergren; Niklas Ekstrand; Thomas Petersson; Johnny Hagel; Kenneth Roos; P. A. Danielsson; Anders Iwers; Roger Öjersson

Tiamat is a Swedish metal band founded near Stockholm in 1990 and led by Johan Edlund. To date they have released ten studio albums. The band went through a number of stylistic changes in their earlier releases before settling on gothic metal. Under Edlund's leadership, the band would modify their style with influences ranging from Black Sabbath, Mercyful Fate, Candlemass, Pink Floyd and King Crimson combined with Sumerian lyrical themes. H. P. Lovecraft's writings also appear to have influenced Tiamat's thematology, a development consistent with a broader trend in death metal culture.

== History ==
The band was formed as a four-piece under the name Treblinka in 1987. Using pseudonyms they released the single "Severe Abomination" in 1989. After having recorded the album Sumerian Cry in 1989, guitarist/vocalist Johan Edlund and bassist Jörgen Thullberg parted ways with the other two founding members who formed the band Expulsion. They subsequently changed the name to Tiamat, after the Babylonian goddess representing the primordial sea and forebear to other gods. The Sumerian Cry album included re-recorded Treblinka songs and was released in June 1990.

Edlund recruited Thomas Petersson on guitars and Niklas Ekstrand on drums and signed the band to Century Records. They started the recording process in the middle of 1991, beginning a lengthy collaboration with the polish guitarist Waldemar Sorychta would produce and contribute instrumentation to many of the band's albums.

1994's critically acclaimed Wildhoney mixed raw vocals, slow guitar riffs and synthesizer sounds which sounded different from other extreme metal bands active at that time. An almost continuous 40-minute piece of music, Wildhoney led to the band's appearances at the Dynamo and Wacken Open Air metal festivals in 1995. The group would play a second gig at Dynamo two years later.

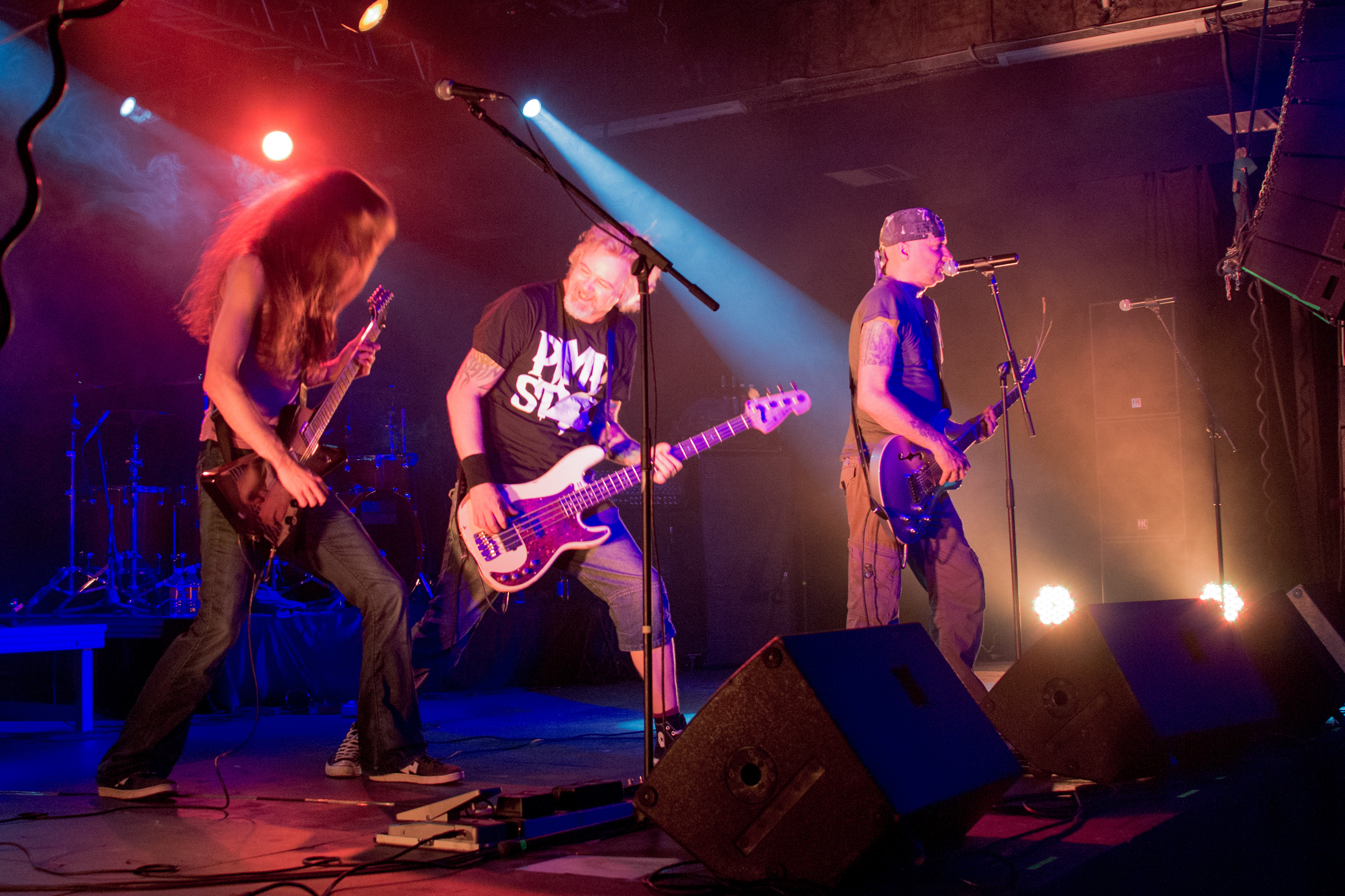
Tiamat performing in Krasnodar, Russia, May 2013

Upon the release of A Deeper Kind of Slumber in 1997, Edlund relocated from Sweden to Germany and declared himself the only permanent member of the band; all albums that would follow would cement the band into a more gothic metal/rock sound, quite different from the extreme music they did in the years before.

The band signed to Nuclear Blast in June 2007, and released their ninth album Amanethes in April 2008. In August of that year, Thomas Wyreson announced that he was quitting the band, stating that "it's just kinda hard to make everything work with the family etc."

Their song "Cain" was featured in the 2004 video game Vampire: The Masquerade – Bloodlines.

The band's tenth full-length studio album, The Scarred People, was released in November 2012 through Napalm Records.

== Musical style ==
When they were still named Treblinka, the band played raw black/death metal. Early Tiamat albums like The Astral Sleep and Clouds explored death-doom, before the band shifted towards a more gothic and atmospheric sound on Wildhoney (1994) and beyond, with later albums showing a Sisters of Mercy and Pink Floyd influence.

== Band members ==
=== Current members ===
- Johan Edlund – vocals (1987–present), guitar (1987–present), keyboards, theremin (1997–present)
- Lars Sköld – drums (1994–present)

=== Current touring members ===
- Gustaf Hielm – bass (2017–present)
- Per Wiberg – keyboards (2018, 2022–present)
- Simon Johansson – guitar (2022–present)

=== Former members ===
- Jörgen "Juck" Thullberg – bass (1987–1992)
- Anders Holmberg – drums (1987–1990)
- Stefan Lagergren – guitars (1987–1990)
- Niklas Ekstrand – drums (1990–1994)
- Thomas Wyreson (formerly Thomas Petersson) – guitars (1990–1994, 1996–1999, 2001–2008) (live member (2016, 2017–?))
- Johnny Hagel – bass (1992–1996)
- Kenneth Roos – keyboards (1992–1994)
- P. A. Danielsson – keyboards (1994–1995; died 2004)
- Anders Iwers – bass, occasional vocals (1996–2017) (live member (1992))
- Roger Öjersson – guitars, keyboards, mandolin, backing vocals (2010–2017)

=== Former touring members ===
- Nicke Andersson – drums (1989)
- Anders Iwers – bass (1992)
- Henrik Bergqvist – guitars (2002)
- Martin Brändström – keyboards (2002–2009)
- Fredrik Åkesson – guitars (2004)
- Henriette Bordvik – female vocals (2005, 2015, 2016, 2017)
- Martin Powell – keyboards (2006–2007)
- Johan Niemann – guitars (2008, 2018)
- Joakim Svalberg – keyboards (2011–2012)
- Rikard Zander – keyboards (2014–2016, 2017–2018)
- Thomas Wyreson (formerly Thomas Petersson) – guitars (2016, 2017–?)
- Carl Westholm – keyboards (2016–2017)
- Daniel Karlsson – keyboards (2017)
- Magnus Henriksson – guitars (2017, ?–2022)
- Jonas Öijvall – keyboards (2018, ?–2022)

== Discography ==
=== Studio albums ===
Title	Album details	Peak chart positions				Sales
Title	Album details	SWE	GER	AUT	BEL	Sales
Sumerian Cry	Released: 7 June 1990; Label: CMFT Productions; Formats: CD, LP, CS, DL	—	—	—	—	
The Astral Sleep	Released: 1 September 1991; Label: Century Media; Formats: CD, LP, CS, DL	—	—	—	—	
Clouds	Released: 2 December 1992; Label: Century Media; Formats: CD, LP, CS, DL	—	—	—	—	
Wildhoney	Released: 25 October 1994; Label: Century Media; Formats: CD, LP, CS, DL	—	29	—	—	US: 8,082+
A Deeper Kind of Slumber	Released: 12 August 1997; Label: Century Media; Formats: CD, LP, CS, DL	39	29	22	—	
Skeleton Skeletron	Released: 11 August 1999; Label: Century Media; Formats: CD, LP, CS, DL	56	19	47	—	
Judas Christ	Released: 30 April 2002; Label: Century Media; Formats: CD, LP, CS, DL	52	28	—	—	
Prey	Released: 27 October 2003; Label: Century Media; Formats: CD, LP, CS, DL	—	83	—	—	
Amanethes	Released: 27 May 2008; Label: Nuclear Blast; Formats: CD, LP, DL	13	69	—	—	
The Scarred People	Released: 2 November 2012; Label: Napalm; Formats: CD, LP, DL	11	62	—	154	
"—" denotes a recording that did not chart or was not released in that territory.

=== Singles ===
Title	Year	Album
"A Winter Shadow"	1990	The Astral Sleep
"Cold Seed"	1997	A Deeper Kind of Slumber
"Brighter Than the Sun"	1999	Skeleton Skeletron
"Vote for Love"	2002	Judas Christ
"Cain"	2003	Prey
"The Temple of the Crescent Moon"	2008	Amanethes
"Born to Die"	2013	The Scarred People

=== EPs ===
Title	EP details
Gaia	Released: 28 November 1994; Label: Century Media; Formats: CD
For Her Pleasure	Released: 8 November 1999; Label: Century Media; Formats: CD, DL

=== Live albums ===
Title	Album details
The Sleeping Beauty (Live in Israel)	Released: 5 April 1994; Label: Century Media; Formats: CD

=== Compilation albums ===
Title	Album details
The Musical History of Tiamat	Released: February 1995; Label: Century Media; Formats: CD
Commandments	Released: 26 February 2007; Label: Century Media; Formats: CD, DL
The Ark of the Covenant - The Complete Century Media Years	Released: 18 August 2008; Label: Century Media; Formats: CD

=== Video albums ===
Title	Video details	Peak chart positions
Title	Video details	SWE
The Church of Tiamat	Released: 24 April 2006; Label: Metal Mind Productions; Formats: DVD	5
"—" denotes a recording that did not chart or was not released in that territory.

=== Music videos ===
Year	Title	Directed	Album
1992	"Sleeping Beauty"	—	Clouds
1995	"Whatever That Hurts"	Tamara Jordan	Wildhoney
1995	"Gaia"	Tamara Jordan	Wildhoney
1997	"Cold Seed"	Tamara Jordan	A Deeper Kind of Slumber
1999	"Brighter Than the Sun"	Doro Film	Skeleton Skeletron
2002	"Vote for Love"	Alexander Detig (Sound & Vision Film, Video & Media GmbH)	Judas Christ
2003	"Cain"	Patric Ullaeus (Revolver Film)	Prey
2003	"Do You Dream of Me?"	Eugen Erhan	Wildhoney
2012	"The Scarred People"	angst-im-wald	The Scarred People
2013	"384"	Ioanna Lampropoulou	The Scarred People
2013	"Love Terrorists"	Johan Edlund, Ioanna Lampropoulou	The Scarred People
2013	"The Red of the Morning Sun"	Johan Edlund, Ioanna Lampropoulou	The Scarred People
