= Dr. Death (1945 TV series) =

American TV drama series

- Genre: Crime drama; Thriller
- Starring: Vinton Hayworth; Mary Patton
- Country of origin: United States
- Original language: English
- No. of episodes: 4

Production
- Production company: NBC Productions

Original release
- Network: WNBT
- Release: 1945 – 1945

Dr. Death is one of the earliest United States dramatic TV series. Produced and broadcast in New York City, it was broadcast in 1945 on WNBT, and was a four-part thriller. It was one of the earliest mini-series produced for television, though not the first, as the BBC in the UK had transmitted Ann and Harold in 1938 (it is not known if there were any other mini-series prior to 1945, as early television series are poorly documented).

== Production ==
The program was adapted from Cornell Woolrich's book The Black Angel by Ernest Colling, who also directed the show. The cast included Vinton Hayworth and Mary Patton.

== Reception ==
Billboard magazine reviewed the second episode of the series with a fairly positive review, saying that "The four-part thriller was well-acted" but also commenting on some of the limitations of the production.

== Episode status ==
As methods to record live television did not exist until late 1947, nothing remains of the series. It is not even known if any still photographs or scripts exist of the series.
