= Johan Edlund =

Swedish singer

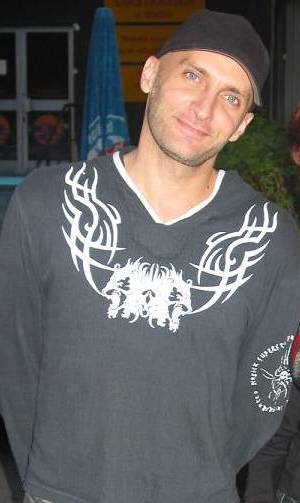
Johan Edlund

Johan Edlund (born 9 March 1971) is a Swedish singer, guitarist, and keyboardist and leader of the bands Tiamat and Lucyfire. He has also remixed songs for Rammstein and London After Midnight. He was also a guest singer in the Dutch progressive metal project Ayreon.

Edlund was born in Södertälje, Stockholm County. At the beginning of his career, he relied solely on death grunts for singing but later switched to deep, baritone vocals, in part because Tiamat underwent a significant shift in musical styles during the middle of the 1990s. He lives in Nova Scotia with his Canadian wife and family.

He lived in Thessaloniki, Greece for 13 years, where he also became a supporter of Greek football club PAOK.

== Discography ==
- Unanimated – In the Forest of the Dreaming Dead (1993, No Fashion Records, vocals)
- Rammstein – Stripped (single, 1998, Motor Music, remix)
- Ayreon – Universal Migrator Part 1: The Dream Sequencer (2000, Transmission Records, vocals)
- LucyFire – This Dollar Saved My Life at Whitehorse (2001, Steamhammer Records)
- Flowing Tears – Invanity – Live in Berlin (2007, Ascendance Records, vocals)
- Rammstein – Made in Germany 1995–2011 (2011, Universal Music Group, remix)
