= 1935 in radio =

The year 1935 saw a number of significant happenings in radio broadcasting history.

== Events ==
- 23 January – Station 1YA Auckland moves into the first purpose-built broadcasting premises in New Zealand.
- 25 January – Tsar Boris III signs a decree making all broadcasting in Bulgaria a state-organized activity.
- 17 February – The Droitwich medium-wave transmitter begins service in England, broadcasting the Midland Regional Programme of the BBC on a frequency of 1013 kHz.
- 28 April – Fireside chat by the President of the United States: On the Works Relief Program.
- 12 March – Reformed American gambler Kid Canfield becomes the first person to die live on radio, while making a promotional broadcast on WHIS in Bluefield, West Virginia.
- 24 March – The Major Bowes Amateur Hour is broadcast nationally for the first time on NBC, after having been on the New York City radio station WHN.
- 1 June – In Japan, NHK begins its international service, Radio Japan, with a daily one-hour programme in English and Japanese beamed towards North America.
- 29 July – Lux Radio Theater has its first show on CBS, after having been on NBC Blue for a year.
- 4 August – In Portugal, the Emissora Nacional de Radiodifusão, forerunner of today's RDP – Radiodifusão Portuguesa, is officially inaugurated.
- 10 December – The first broadcast commentary on a snooker match (Joe Davis v. Horace Lindrum) is given in the BBC Regional Programme.
- date unknown
  - In preparation for the Italian invasion of Abyssinia (Ethiopia), "Radio Marina" is taken under government control.
  - Radio is introduced into Tunisia.

== Debuts ==
=== Programs ===
- 1 January – The Story of Mary Marlin debuts on NBC after having been on WMAQ in Chicago.
- 4 January – Bob Hope has his network radio debut on the variety show The Intimate Revue.
- 4 January – The Beatrice Lillie Show debuts on NBC.
- 4 February – Mrs. Wiggs of the Cabbage Patch debuts on CBS.
- April – A deputation from the University of Wales a pproaches John Reith, head of the BBC, who agrees to Wales becoming a BBC region.
- 17 April – House of Glass debuts on the Blue Network.
- 20 April – Your Hit Parade (first known as just The Hit Parade or Lucky Strike Hit Parade) debuts on NBC.
- 27 April – Flash Gordon, a popular comic strip, debuts as a radio serial on the Mutual Broadcasting System
- 30 May – America's Town Meeting of the Air debuts on the Blue Network.
- 30 June – Uncle Charlie's Tent Showdebuts on NBC.
- 14 July – America's Hour debuts on CBS.
- 22 July – A Voz do Brasil debuts on Brazil's Programa Nacional (and will still be running more than 80 years later).
- 5 August – Backstage Wife debuts on Mutual.
- September – Jaime Yankelevich, owner of several Argentine radio stations, contracts with Radio Belgrano to produce a weekly programme of Hollywood gossip.
- 9 October – Cavalcade of America debuts on CBS.
- 29 October – The Jumbo Fire Chief Program starring Jimmy Durante debuts on NBC.
- 5 December
  - Bing Crosby becomes guest host of the Kraft Music Hall (and the following month becomes full-time host, after Paul Whiteman).
  - Liberty Life Insurance sells WNOX AM of Knoxville to Continental Radio Co.
- UNDATED – The Jack Berch Show debuts on the Blue Network.

=== Stations ===
- 20 April – WLEU, Erie, Pennsylvania, begins broadcasting on 1420 kHz with 250 W power (daytime) and 100 W (night).
- 1 October – KDON, Del Monte, California, begins broadcasting on 1210 kHz with 100 W power.
- UNDATED – WTMV, East St. Louis, Illinois, begins broadcasting on 1500 kHz with 100 W power.

== Endings ==
- 2 April – KFPM, Greenville, Texas, ends broadcast operations. The station had 15 W power, and its operator said it was "losing money every day."
- 4 June - The Fire Chief ends its run on network radio (NBC).
- 23 June – The Gibson Family ends its run on network radio (NBC).
- 28 June – The Beatrice Lillie Show ends its run on network radio (NBC).
- 8 September – Uncle Charlie's Tent Showends its run on network radio (NBC).
- 22 September – America's Hour ends its run on network radio (CBS).
- 25 December – House of Glass ends its run on the Blue Network.

== Births ==
- 23 March – Barry Cryer (died 2022), English comedy scriptwriter and performer.
- 15 May – Tony Butler, English radio sports presenter in the west midlands.
- 26 May – Sheila Steafel (died 2019), South-African born British actress.
- 28 July – Simon Dee, born Cyril Henty-Dodd (died 2009), English DJ.
- 13 October – Bruce Morrow ("Cousin Brucie"), American radio presenter.
- 15 November – Gillian Reynolds, English radio critic.
- 18 December – Rosemary Leach (died 2017), English actress.
- Gary Dee (died 1995), pioneer in controversial talk radio, mostly in Cleveland, Ohio.

== Deaths ==
- 6 June – George Grossmith Jr., 61, actor, theatre producer and manager, director, playwright and songwriter, Programme Advisor to BBC
- 15 August – Will Rogers, 55, US actor, humorist and radio personality (air crash)
