= 3rd Primetime Emmy Awards =

Television award

- Date: January 23, 1951
- Location: Ambassador Hotel, Los Angeles, California
- Presented by: Academy of Television Arts and Sciences
- Hosted by: Earl Warren

Highlights
- Best Dramatic Show: Pulitzer Prize Playhouse
- Best Variety Show: The Alan Young Show

Television/radio coverage
- Network: KLAC

The 3rd Emmy Awards, retroactively known as the 3rd Primetime Emmy Awards after the debut of the Daytime Emmy Awards, were presented at the Ambassador Hotel in Los Angeles, California on January 23, 1951.

This would be the last year that the Emmys were primarily given out to shows that were produced or aired in the Los Angeles area. Starting with the 4th Annual Emmy Awards, nominations were considered on a national television network basis.

== Winners and nominees ==
Winners are listed first, highlighted in boldface, and indicated with a double dagger (‡).

=== Programs ===
Programs
**Best Dramatic Show**: **Pulitzer Prize Playhouse (KECA)**‡; Fireside Theater (KTLA); I Remember Mama (KTLA); The Philco Television Playhouse (KNBH); Studio One (KTTV)	**Best Children's Show**: **Time for Beany (KTLA)**‡; The Cisco Kid (KNBH); Jump Jump (KTTV); Kukla, Fran and Ollie (KNBH); The Lone Ranger (KTLA)
**Best Games and Audience Participation Show**: **Truth or Consequences (KTTV)**‡; Kay Kyser's Kollege of Musical Knowledge (KNBH); Life with Linkletter (KECA); Pantomime Quiz (KECA); You Bet Your Life (KNBH)	**Best Cultural Show**: **Campus Chorus and Orchestra (KTSL)**‡; Designed for Women (KNBH); Vienna Philharmonic (KTTV); Sunset Service (KNBH); The Woman's Voice (KTTV)
**Best Educational Show**: **KFI-TV University (KFI)**‡; Kieran's Kaleidoscope (KECA); Know Your Schools (KFI); Magazine of the Week (KTLA); Zoo Parade (KNBH)	**Best News Program**: **KTLA Newsreel (KTLA)**‡; Clete Roberts (KLAC); Ford News and Weather (KNBH); Fleetwood Lawton (KTSL)
**Best Variety Show**: **The Alan Young Show (KTTV)**‡; Four Star Revue (KNBH); The Ken Murray Show (KTTV); Texaco Star Theater (KNBH); Your Show of Shows (KNBH)	**Best Sports Program**: **Los Angeles Rams Football (KNBH)**‡; College Basketball Games (KTTV); College Football Games (KTTV); Hollywood Baseball (KLAC); Los Angeles Baseball (KFI)
**Best Public Service**: **City at Night (KTLA)**‡; Classified Column (KTTV); In Our Time (KTTV); Community Chest Kickoff; Teleforum (KTLA); Marshall Plan (KECA)

=== Acting ===
Acting
**Best Actor**: **Alan Young**‡; Sid Caesar; José Ferrer; Stan Freberg; Charles Ruggles	**Best Actress**: **Gertrude Berg**‡; Judith Anderson; Imogene Coca; Helen Hayes; Betty White

=== Hosting ===
Hosting
**Most Outstanding Personality**
- **Groucho Marx (KNBH)**‡
  - Sid Caesar (KNBH)
  - Faye Emerson (KTTV and KECA)
  - Dick Lane (KTLA)

=== Special Events ===
Special Events
**Best Special Events**
- **Departure of Marines to Korea (KTLA)**‡
  - Arrival of Cruiser from Korea (KTLA)
  - Commissioning of Hospital Ship Haven
  - Election Coverage (KECA)
  - Tournament of Roses (KECA)

=== Station Awards ===
- **KTLA** for Station Achievement
- **KNBH** for Technical Achievement
