= The Jumbo Fire Chief Program =

- Other names: The Circus Concert; The Fire-Chief Program; The Fire-Chief Show; Jumbo Fire-Chief Program
- Genre: Comedy
- Running time: 28-31 minutes
- Country of origin: United States
- Language: English
- Home station: WEAF
- Syndicates: NBC Red Network
- Starring: Jimmy Durante; Donald Novis; Gloria Grafton
- Announcer: Louis A. Witton
- Written by: Ben Hecht; Charles MacArthur
- Directed by: Billy Rose; Adolph Deutsch (music director)
- Recording studio: The Hippodrome, New York City
- Original release: October 22, 1935 (rehearsal show); October 29, 1935 – January 14, 1936
- No. of series: 1
- No. of episodes: 12 episodes known to exist, 19 believed to have been recorded
- Opening theme: Over and Over Again by Richard Rodgers and Lorenz Hart
- Ending theme: The Jumbo Fire Chief Program ending theme
- Sponsored by: Texaco

The Jumbo Fire Chief Program is an American old-time radio program starring Jimmy Durante, Donald Novis and Gloria Grafton. The series originated from WEAF radio in New York and was broadcast nationally over the Red Network of the National Broadcasting Company. The series was based on Billy Rose's musical circus act Jumbo which premiered on Broadway in November 1935 and a continuation of sponsor Texaco's The Fire Chief, a radio program starring Ed Wynn that ended its three-year run several months before Jumbo' s premiere. The program starred Jimmy Durante as Claudius "Brainy" Bowers, the overzealous circus promoter of the Consodine circus act who usually gets the show in financial crisis due to his over exaggeration of the show's profits, and Donald Novis and Gloria Grafton as young love interests Matt Mulligan, Jr. and Mickey Consodine. Mickey is the daughter of unheard character John Consodine, the owner of the circus act.

The radio program broadcast an unknown number of episodes (Note: Several sources list the number as 19 but all agree of 12 surviving episodes broadcast between October 1935–January 1936. The other seven either do not have title or have forgotten titles.) over the NBC from October 22, 1935–January 14, 1936. The series was broadcast from and performed at the New York Hippodrome before an average crowd of 4500–5000 spectators each week.

== Background ==
=== Ed Wynn's The Fire Chief ===
The series originated from Ed Wynn's departure from NBC's The Fire Chief in early 1935 and the show's sponsor Texaco wanting to continue the series.

Texaco and NBC premiered The Fire Chief in 1932. Comedian Ed Wynn played the title role of the Fire Chief. The series was popular and one of the first radio programs to be performed before a live studio audience. Wynn left the program temporarily in 1933 when, in September of that year, Wynn along with Hungarian-born violinist Ota Gygi founded his own radio station, the Amalgamated Broadcasting System. The station lost money and went out of business five weeks later in November 1933. He returned to The Fire Chief which continued until being cancelled in early 1935.

=== Billy Rose's Jumbo ===
On November 22, 1935, Billy Rose's musical Jumbo premiered at The Hippodrome in New York City. The musical told the story about a financially strapped circus. The musical also starred Durante, Novis and Grafton. At the end of each performance, Durante would lay down on the stage and permit a live elephant to place its foot upon his head. The musical closed on April 18, 1936, after 233 performances.

=== Texaco's Jumbo Fire Chief ===
The Texas Company, a.k.a. Texaco, decided to continue their sponsored Fire Chief with The Jumbo Fire Chief Program. The Jumbo Fire Chief Program used the title of its predecessor and the premise of Jumbo. The serialized version of Jumbo premiered on October 29, 1935, from the Hippodrome and was broadcast over NBC. The series shared the same premise as the musical, which was the tale of a financially strapped circus and the tale of two young love interests; Matt Mulligan, Jr., (Donald Davis), and Mickey Consodine, (Gloria Grafton). The series failed to reach popularity amongst listening audiences and only aired 12 episodes before being cancelled on January 14, 1936. (Note: This date is disputed amongst radio historians. While most sources and radio historians list the date of January 14, 1936, as the air date of the last episode of the program, some sources and historians believe the air date of the program's last episode to be February 25, 1936, due to 7 episodes of the program that have either unknown or forgotten titles.)

== Cast and characters ==
- Claudius "Brainy" Bowers (Jimmy Durante) is the main protagonist of the radio program. Bowers, often called "Brainy" by his friends and circus counterparts, is the overzealous promoter of the circus. Brainy often is the one responsible for the circus' financial difficulties because of his over exaggeration of the show's profits and the performers income. But by the end of the episode, the circus manages to stay open another week until the next payment was due. Durante was popular in the venue of radio before Jumbo Fire Chief. Durante made his first appearance on radio on the September 10, 1933 telecast of NBC's The Chase and Sanborn Hour. He performed regularly on the show until November 12 of that year. After host Eddie Cantor left the program in 1934, Durante was brought back as substitute host. He was host of the program from April 22–September 30, 1934. After Jumbo Fire Chief, Durante starred in The Durante-Moore Show for seven years and then went to television with All Star Revue and The Jimmy Durante Show.
- Matt Mulligan, Jr. (Donald Novis) is the son of Matt Mulligan, Sr., the owner of the Mulligan Circus which is the main competition to the Consodine Show. Mulligan is the love interest of Consodine's daughter Mickey.
- Mickey Consodine (Gloria Grafton) is the daughter of John Consodine and love interest to Matt, Jr.
- Mr. Jellico (A.P. Kaye) is a representative from the Income Tax Department who usually comes every week to collect taxes accumulated from the circus.

=== Unheard characters ===
- John Consodine is the owner of the Consodine Show. Although never heard on mic, he is mentioned in almost every episode.
