= Amalgamated Broadcasting System =

Failed American radio network

The Amalgamated Broadcasting System (ABS), sometimes referred to as the Amalgamated Network (or simply Amalgamated) was an ambitious, although unsuccessful, attempt to establish a national "third radio network" in the United States. Its primary promoters were the company's president, American comedian Ed Wynn, and its vice-president, Hungarian-born violinist Ota Gygi. The network's inaugural broadcast on September 25, 1933, was carried by a small group of stations located in the Northeast. Despite plans to eventually expand nationwide, the network never grew beyond its original group of affiliates, and ceased operations at midnight November 1, 1933, just five weeks after its debut. Its failure resulted in a major financial loss, plus significant emotional distress, for Wynn.

== Formation ==
In the early 1930s, network radio in the United States was dominated by two major companies: the National Broadcasting Company (NBC), formed in 1926, which operated two national networks, known as the NBC-Red and the NBC-Blue, plus the Columbia Broadcasting System (CBS), established in 1927. These two companies had subsequently signed affiliation agreements with almost all of the country's major radio stations, leaving limited program options for a few hundred remaining medium and small stations. This imbalance led to ongoing efforts to create a "third radio network", to help the left-out stations compete with the NBC and CBS programs.

The idea to form ABS originated with Ota Gygi, who then enlisted Wynn, who, as the "Fire Chief" on the original Fire Chief Program on NBC, was one of the country's best-known performers. Despite his professional and financial success, Wynn was concerned about his future and the power the established networks had over the programming policies of their local affiliate stations. It was his hope that ABS would provide a programming alternative, and would also insure a more stable financial future for himself and his family, explaining that "acting is such an uncertain profession, and I want to establish a business for my actor son, Keenan, which will be sane and secure and bring in plenty of profits".

Formation of the Amalgamated Broadcasting System, Inc. was announced in October 1932, although at the time it was described as being a production company. Ed Wynn was the president and "famed producer" Arthur Hopkins was director of productions, with Ota Gygi and T. W. Richardson described as assistants. Irving Berlin and Daniel Frohman were rumored to be planning to join the effort, and the new company, which it was reported "has Radio Row atwitter", was said to have already signed $1,000,000 of business contracts.

Plans for ABS gained support in January 1933 from George W. Trendle, president of the recently founded Michigan Regional Network, who stated his stations would join Amalgamated once it expanded westward. Efforts were made to attract major investors, and there were rumors that additional funding would be coming from "Detroit millionaires", but the network would actually be primarily financed by Ed Wynn's personal funds.

At a March 10, 1933, press dinner, Wynn reviewed his plans: "My idea is to give the listener more radio and less advertising ballyhoo. There is one thing that attracts the average listener to his receiver. He wants entertainment. The spot on the dial where he finds the most entertainment is the spot where the dial will stand. So I want Amalgamated to give the listener a maximum of the best entertainment possible with the least possible advertising talk." It was planned to greatly limit commercial messages, in order to "limit the ballyhoo to thirty words—a curtain announcement at the beginning and the end". (The restriction of advertising messages to short announcements at the start and close of each program had been the original network radio policy, until NBC and CBS abandoned it as the 1930s progressed.) Moreover, "in the broadcasting station the plan for the whole day's schedule should be in the hands of the program manager. No prerogatives should be surrendered there to commercial interests." Wynn stressed the need for high quality programming, so that: "The listener will know that by tuning in one of our programs at any time from 8 a. m. until 1 a. m. he will be able to hear a fine program." He also hoped that, with the country mired in the depths of the Great Depression, his network would provide an additional source of employment for the numerous unemployed actors and other entertainers.

Despite announcements that the new network would soon start operations, its launch date was repeatedly postponed, creating growing skepticism within the radio industry. The work needed to establish a New York City flagship station was particularly complicated. An effort was made to combine four small stations — WCDA, WBNX, WMSG and WAWZ — which all shared a common frequency. WCDA was able to gain control of most of the frequency's broadcasting hours by buying out WBNX and WMSG, after which WCDA changed its call letters to WBNX. WAWZ's owners were unwilling to sell, which meant ABS's key station was not even a full-time operation.

== Operations ==
Amalgamated Broadcasting System (1933)
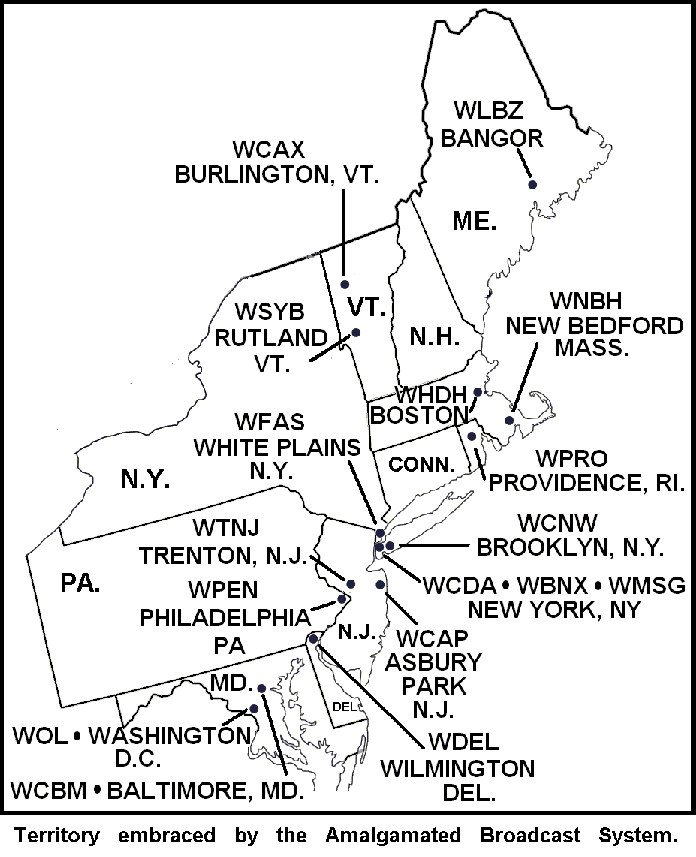
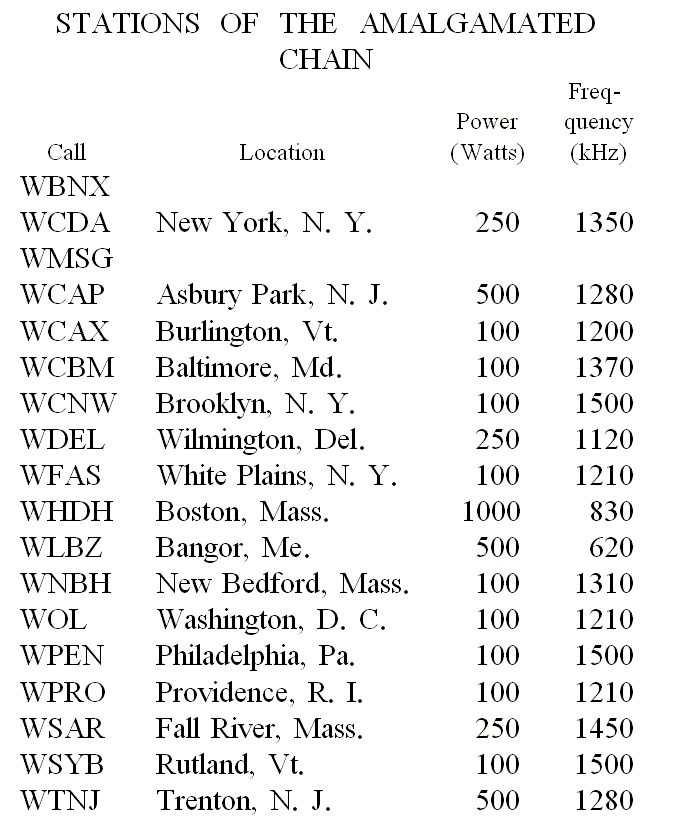

An initial roster of approximately 15 affiliate stations, located in the Northeast, was recruited for the new network, with plans to add additional geographical groups of stations over time. The charter stations were almost all small ones with limited transmitting ranges: their combined powers totaled less than half of that of many individual NBC and CBS stations. (ABS's flagship, WBNX, at only 250 watts, was dwarfed by the three 50,000-watt NBC and CBS flagship stations, which were also located in New York City). To reduce expenses, instead of the specially prepared telephone lines employed by NBC and CBS to link stations together, ABS decided to use Western Union telegraph wires, despite the admonition by one reviewer that using telegraph lines was known to be problematical, and "Broadcast engineers in the know never use them except in a dire emergency."

As company president, Wynn was actively involved in overseeing developments, and planned to be on-hand for the network's launch. However, the delay in the starting date eventually required him to leave in July for Hollywood, for the filming of a movie "The Fire Chief". This left Gygi in charge, who, unlike Wynn, proved to be unpopular, in addition to being unqualified for the task of running a radio network. At a press conference launching ABS, Gygi "managed to alienate almost the entire New York City press corps", "by announcing... that he was only interested in what The New York Times thought of the project and had no use for any of the other papers." This irked the influential New York Daily News radio critic Ben Gross, whose lead in attacking the apparent ABS attitude was picked up by his peers — and by advertisers whom Gygi reportedly alienated by positioning the network toward treating advertising as "a necessary but distasteful evil", which in turn caused ABS difficulty attracting sponsors needed to pay for the promised top quality programming.

The new network finally debuted with a four-hour gala on September 25, 1933, broadcast from its newly built studios (and luxurious offices) at 501 Madison Avenue in New York City. Personalities appearing on the program schedule included Vaughn De Leath and Norman Brokenshire, with welcoming addresses by Postmaster General James A. Farley, Judge E. O. Sykes, chairman of the Federal Radio Commission, and Representative Sol Bloom of New York, who spoke from Washington via WOL. Ed Wynn did not appear, in part because his radio contract would not allow him to be on a competing network. Ben Gross, who attended, later described the event as poorly organized and disrupted by an unruly audience.

== Failure and aftermath ==
Despite initial high hopes, the ABS network struggled from the beginning. The plan to greatly restrict advertising "ballyhoo" was even more successful than intended, for despite Wynn's claim in March that there were "twenty-seven sponsors ready", none of the ABS offerings ever gained sponsorship. (Affiliates therefore had to pay the network to carry its unsponsored "sustaining programs".) Chronically under-financed, there were reports that the employees had worked unpaid for weeks, and when they finally began to receive salaries, it was at half-pay.

Wynn returned from Hollywood to investigate reports that the network was faltering. Prior to its launch, a confident Wynn had said, "We may get knocked down a couple of times but we'll get up smiling and go right ahead toward our objective, building slowly but firmly so that each time we take a set-back — if we must take set-backs — it will be only for a short distance. Then we will build back up from there." However, he was shocked to find the situation unsalvageable, and resigned as ABS president on October 25. A series of unsuccessful attempts were made by Gygi to save the network, but Amalgamated ceased operations at midnight November 1, 1933, only five weeks after its start. Within a few days creditors had forced the network into involuntary bankruptcy and liquidation, with the $10,000 pipe organ sold for $1,000, and the studios acquired for use by a Newark, New Jersey, station, WNEW. Ed Wynn felt ashamed and personally responsible for the ABS fiasco. He vowed to repay the investors, whose losses were estimated to be as much as in excess of $300,000. The resulting pressure, plus the end of The Fire Chief Program and his marital trouble two years later, helped drive the comedian toward a nervous breakdown by the end of the 1930s.

The film The Great Man (1956), which has a broadcasting background and features Ed Wynn in a supporting role, is based at a fictional network known as the "Amalgamated Broadcasting Network". A recording of ABS's inaugural broadcast survives and is circulated among old-time radio fans.

The ABS failure did not deter others from promoting their own "third network" attempts:

- One eventual success was the Mutual Broadcasting System (Mutual), although it would never gain the prominence of the older NBC and CBS networks. It was established on September 29, 1934, and was long considered the fourth major radio network following the formation of ABC.
- NBC's Blue network was sold in 1943 to American Broadcasting System, Inc., a radio broadcaster controlled by former undersecretary of commerce and then-Chairman of Live Savers Corp. Edward J. Noble, after which it initially took on "The Blue Network" branding. In 1945, the Blue Network was folded into Noble's ABS, and re-branded as the "American Broadcasting Company" (ABC). ABC's radio network replaced CBS as the third major radio network, behind NBC and CBS.

Aside from "third network" attempts, there were other national network attempts:

- Ota Gygi in 1934 unsuccessfully tried to form a network around station WCFL in Chicago, then in 1936 found a new backer, Chicago industrialist Samuel Insull, and became vice president of the short-lived Affiliated Broadcasting Company (ABC; pre-Edward Noble). (In contrast, when Ed Wynn was asked if he would make another attempt at organizing a radio network, his firm reply was: "Never again. My business is to make people laugh, not to make myself feel like crying.")

After ABC's establishment as the third major radio network, and Mutual's subsequent slide to fourth, there were attempts at additional national radio networks:

- The Liberty Broadcasting System (Liberty; considered second in size to Mutual), launched in 1948 by Gordon McLendon, which mainly aired live recreations of Major League Baseball (MLB) games, but also aired various other types of programming, such as late night band remotes.
- The Progressive Broadcasting System (PBS; considered below Liberty), a short-lived radio network launched in the 1950s, which "catered to small radio stations".
