= Top-rated United States television programs of 1950–51 =

This table displays the top-rated primetime television series of the 1950–51 season as measured by Nielsen Media Research.

Rank	Program	Network	Rating
1	Texaco Star Theater	NBC	61.6
2	Fireside Theatre	NBC	52.6
3	Philco TV Playhouse	NBC	45.3
4	Your Show of Shows	NBC	42.6
5	The Colgate Comedy Hour	NBC	42.0
6	Gillette Cavalcade of Sports	NBC	41.3
7	The Lone Ranger	ABC	41.2
8	Arthur Godfrey's Talent Scouts	CBS	40.6
9	Hopalong Cassidy	NBC	39.9
10	Mama	CBS	39.7
11	Robert Montgomery Presents	NBC	38.8
12	Martin Kane, Private Eye	NBC	37.8
13	Man Against Crime	CBS	37.4
14	Kraft Television Theatre	NBC	37.0
15	The Toast of the Town	CBS	36.5
16	The Aldrich Family	NBC	36.1
17	You Bet Your Life	NBC	36.0
18	Arthur Godfrey and His Friends	CBS	35.9
19	Armstrong Circle Theatre	NBC	35.6
19	Lights Out	NBC	35.6
19	Big Town	CBS	35.6
22	The Alan Young Show	CBS	34.4
23	Stop the Music	ABC	34.0
24	Studio One	CBS	33.8
25	The Big Story	NBC	33.7
26	Pabst Blue Ribbon Bouts	CBS	33.4
26	The Original Amateur Hour	NBC	33.4
28	The Ken Murray Show	CBS	32.1
29	Your Hit Parade	NBC	32.0
30	Lux Video Theatre	CBS	31.5
30	The Speidel Show	NBC	31.5
