= Four Star Revue =

- Also known as: All Star Revue; All Star Summer Revue
- Genre: Variety; Comedy
- Written by: see below
- Directed by: see below
- Starring: Ed Wynn; Danny Thomas; Jack Carson; Jimmy Durante; Martha Raye
- Theme music composer: Jack Mason (Danny Thomas's theme); Jimmy Durante (Jimmy Durante's theme); Milton DeLugg
- Opening theme: All-Star Revue Original Music (main theme; see below)
- Country of origin: United States
- Original language: English
- No. of seasons: 4
- No. of episodes: 121 (Four Star Revue); 10 (All Star Summer Revue)

Production
- Executive producers: Samuel Fuller; Peter Barnum; Harold Kemp
- Producer: see below
- Production locations: Center Theater (season 1, primary location; 2-4, secondary location); The Burbank Studios (season 2-4, primary location)
- Running time: 60 minutes (season 1-3); 90 minutes (season 4)

Original release
- Network: NBC
- Release: October 4, 1950 – December 26, 1953

Related
- The Martha Raye Show; The Jimmy Durante Show; The Colgate Comedy Hour

Four Star Revue (also known as All Star Revue and All Star Summer Revue) is an American variety/comedy program that aired on NBC from October 4, 1950, to December 26, 1953.

The series originally starred four celebrities, Ed Wynn, Danny Thomas, Jack Carson, and Jimmy Durante (hence the name Four Star Revue), alternating as hosts of the program every week. Other stars would join the show beginning with its second season, causing the title to change to All Star Revue. Some of the other stars to pass through during the second season were Bob Hope, Spike Jones and Helen Grayco, and Paul Winchell. As the series progressed, several permanent hosts were added to replace the original four. Some included actress and singer Martha Raye, boxer Rocky Graziano, actor and toastmaster George Jessel, and actress Tallulah Bankhead.

At the time that the show originally aired in the early 1950s, Four Star Revue was known as the second most expensive hour on television. Each episode initially cost approximately $50,000 to produce. The most expensive was its sister series, The Colgate Comedy Hour.

== Overview ==
=== The Four Stars ===
Like its sister series, Four Star Revue started out with four rotating hosts. They were actors Ed Wynn, Jimmy Durante, and Jack Carson and nightclub entertainer Danny Thomas.

Before Four Star Revue, Ed Wynn had been involved in show business for almost 50 years. Wynn began his career in vaudeville in 1903. He was also a star of the Ziegfeld Follies beginning in 1914. Wynn also made it big in the radio scene. He first started on a radio program The Fire Chief in the early 1930s. Wynn also had experience in the then new medium of television. During the 1949-50 television season, Wynn hosted one of the first comedy-variety television shows on CBS, entitled The Ed Wynn Show.

Danny Thomas was born Amos Muzyad Yakhoob Kairouz on January 6, 1912, in Deerfield, Michigan. Before Four Star Revue and his most memorable role on Make Room for Daddy, which premiered in 1953, Thomas had already established himself as an entertainer. Thomas had started his career as a performer on local Detroit, Michigan, station WMBC program The Happy Hour Club in 1932. In August 1940, Kairouz began performing at the 5100 Club in Chicago, Illinois, under the pseudonym "Danny Thomas" (after two of his brothers). Thomas enjoyed success in the nightclub business and also found some success in the radio medium. Thomas made appearances on such radio shows as The Bickersons, The Baby Snooks Show, and The Big Show starring future recurring Revue hostess Tallulah Bankhead. Thomas got a stint at his own radio show entitled The Danny Thomas Show, which ran from 1942 to 1943 on the Blue Network and again from 1947 to 1948 on CBS.

Jimmy Durante, known to many as The Schnoz and the Great Schnozzola, established himself as a comedian and talented musician long before Revue and before the beginning of television itself. Durante first became known as a member of the Original New Orleans Jazz Band, the first recognizable jazz band in New York. Durante was the only member of the group not originally from New Orleans. His routine of breaking into a song to deliver a joke, with band or orchestra chord punctuation after each line, became a Durante trademark. In 1920 the group was renamed Jimmy Durante's Jazz Band. Later on in the 1920s, Durante spent time in vaudeville and formed the comedy trio of Clayton, Jackson, and Durante, also known as The Three Sawdust Bums with fellow comedians Lou Clayton and Eddie Jackson in 1923. He was also known for his recording of the Ben Ryan-composed Inka Dinka Doo in 1933 which, after its debut in the 1934 movie Palooka, was Durante's "theme song" for the rest of his life. Durante also had a relatively good career in radio. He had a recurring role on Eddie Cantor's NBC radio program The Chase and Sanborn Hour in late-1933. From there he went on to The Jumbo Fire Chief Program for a year from 1935-36. He then teamed up with comedian Garry Moore to do The Durante-Moore Show from 1943–1947. After Moore left, the program became known as The Jimmy Durante Show and ran for three more years until being cancelled in 1950.

John Elmer "Jack" Carson was a Canadian-born American-based film actor. Carson had done several memorable films during the 1930s and 1940s before his role on Four Star Revue. He also had a stint with his own radio show in the early 1940s.

=== Season One ===
Four Star Revue premiered on NBC on Wednesday, October 4, 1950. Wynn was the host, and guests included Edith Piaf.

After several episodes had aired, a few problems with the show had come to light. The first problem was location. The second problem was the amount of money put into each episode of the show. The third problem was trying to keep a sole sponsor.

In 1950, it wasn't yet possible to broadcast coast-to-coast, so Four Star Revue, like most live shows, originated from New York (with viewers in other time zones watching a delayed kinescope). At the start of the season, Ed Wynn was the only host to use the Center Theatre (formerly a venue for ice shows but recently converted to a TV studio) at Rockefeller Center in Manhattan. The others at first declined to follow suit because of the theater's huge, 3700-seat capacity, fearing that the audience wouldn't have a good view of the stage and might not laugh at the appropriate moments. But when NBC installed a television monitor there in January 1951, the problem was solved and Durante, Thomas, and Carson relocated.

Television set manufacturer Motorola opened the season as sole sponsor of the show, but cut back after 13 episodes. In January, they began sharing sponsorship with Pet Evaporated Milk and Norge refrigerators, each paying a third of the cost. Four Star Revue cost $50,000 a week to produce, compared to only $17,500 for its CBS competition, Arthur Godfrey and His Friends. But according to the Videodex ratings service, Revue reached an average of 2,339,000 homes, while Godfrey's homes totaled 3,519,000. That worked out to a cost of $6.89 per viewer for Revue, compared to $1.46 for Godfrey.

The season 1 finale aired on July 18, 1951.

=== Season Two ===
The second series premiered on a new night, Saturday, and under a new title. Owing to the decision to increase the number of guest hosts, when the show's second season premiered on September 8, 1951, it was renamed All Star Revue.

Several factors influenced NBC's decision in 1951 to expand the number of Four Star Revue hosts. First, some of the stars were having trouble producing the expected ratings. Second, with more and more money flowing into television, the competition from other networks was becoming fierce. Third, NBC had found with The Colgate Comedy Hour that scheduling conflicts, illnesses, and the simple fact that some of its stars simply weren't well suited to the revue format meant that it was important to have a backup plan. To hedge its bets, the network brought in additional hosts, who could be called upon to fill in for or replace the regulars if needed. Holding on to its original four stars, Revue, in its second season, added the likes of Olsen and Johnson and Martha Raye in four episodes each, Spike Jones and Helen Grayco in two, and Victor Borge, Bob Hope, the Ritz Brothers, and Paul Winchell and Jerry Mahoney, each doing one apiece. With a larger stable of hosts, the old Four Star name was no longer accurate, so the show was rechristened All Star Revue.

The decision to move Revue from Wednesday nights to Saturday nights had to do with the fact that CBS's Arthur Godfrey and His Friends crushed Revue in the ratings. All Star Revue replaced the cancelled Jack Carter Show, in the hope that it would prove a better lead-in to the popular Your Show of Shows. The move had some success; with only Ken Murray and Paul Whiteman as competition, Revue finished the season with a 36.3 rating (tied with Dragnet for 20th place).

The time slot change would seem to be minor compared to the major cast change that occurred after the February 16, 1952, telecast. Jack Carson, one of the original four stars, left the show temporarily to star in a 1952 Broadway revival of the George and Ira Gershwin musical Of Thee I Sing. But that February 16 telecast would turn out to be Carson's last appearance on the show.

Despite the improved ratings, holding on to sponsors didn't get any easier. With an increase in cost to $60,000 per episode, Motorola and Norge dropped out. NBC managed to hold on to Pet Milk and persuaded Kellogg's and Snow Crop orange juice to sign on. But the latter cut out after the May 31st telecast and was replaced the following week by Hazel Bishop Cosmetics.

While starting the season at the Center Theatre in New York City, construction of the transcontinental cable line allowed the show to move to the west coast in November. It was a boon to hosts like Ed Wynn, Jimmy Durante, and Danny Thomas, who were based in Hollywood, but Jack Carson and Carson's replacement Martha Raye continued to originate their shows from New York.

The second season finale aired on June 21, 1952.

=== All Star Summer Revue ===
In 1952, instead of taking a break for the summer, All Star Revue continued. But this summer series had little relationship to the regular season show. Originating from New York's Center Theatre, there were no regular hosts, though Dave Garroway and Jan Murray repeated, as did a few of the guests.

The budget was considerably lower, which explains why there were fewer big-name guests. Sponsors were Pet Evaporated Milk, Kellogg's Cereals (Shredded Wheat and All-Bran), and the United States Army Reserve.

The Summer Revue ran from June 28 to August 30, 1952.

=== Season Three ===
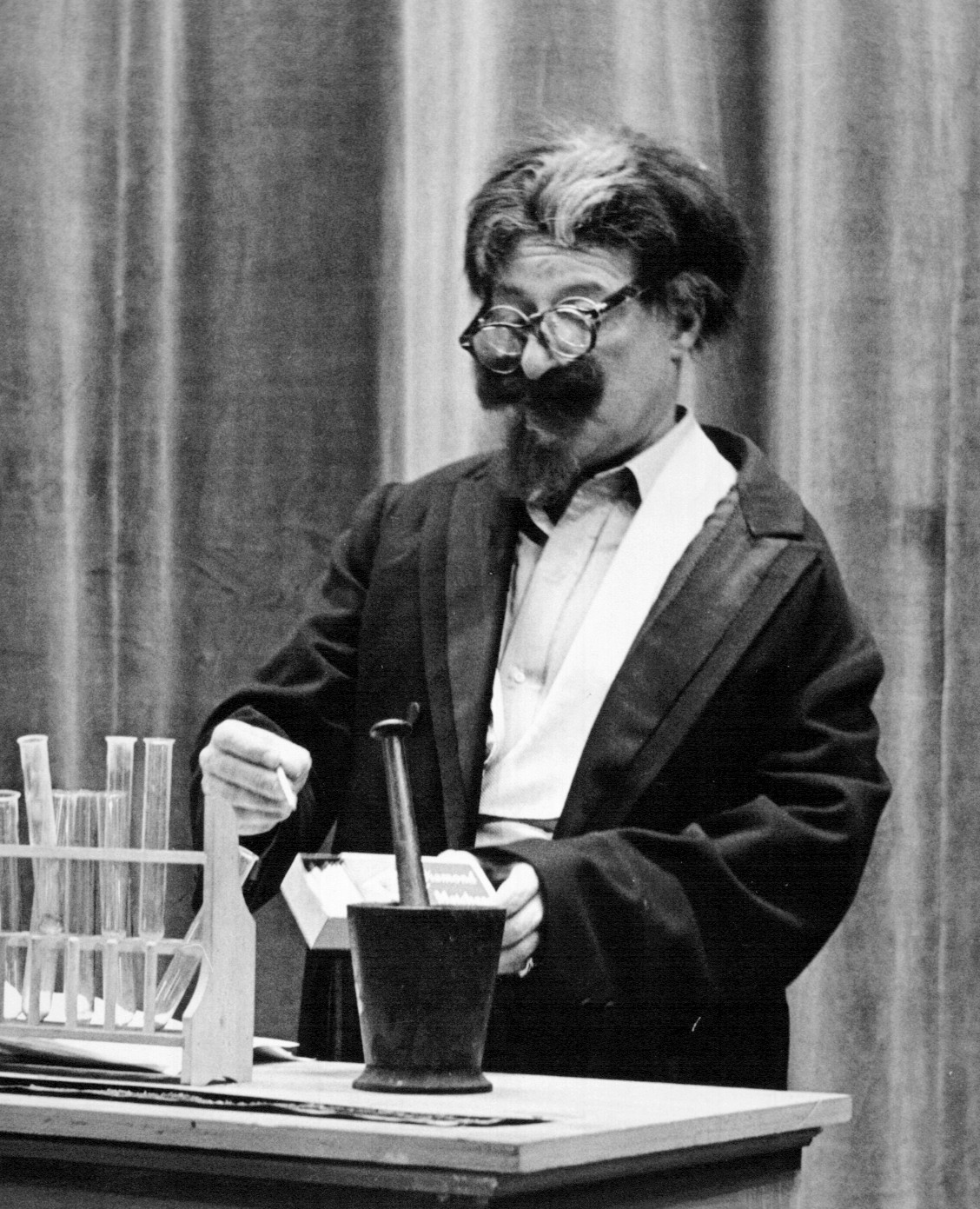
George Jessel performing his Professor Gonzamacher character on the show in 1953.

Season 3 of All Star Revue premiered on September 6, 1952. Unfortunately, Thomas and Wynn did not make it past season 2. Olsen and Johnson were not successful among viewers either. At the time of the third-season premiere, Durante was the only one of the original four stars still on the program. Martha Raye also managed to survive the second season. To fill the open slots, NBC decided on hiring a number of showbiz veterans, including Maurice Chevalier and Harold Lloyd, before eventually settling on actors George Jessel and Tallulah Bankhead as regular hosts. Other hosts that season were Dennis Day, Rosalind Russell, the Ritz Brothers, Walter O'Keefe, Perry Como, and Ben Blue. There was also a special ice skating show starring Sonja Henie with guest Harpo Marx.

Because of sponsor skittishness, there almost wasn't a third season. When Snow Crop pulled out at the end of the previous year, NBC considered cancelling the show. But Kellogg's and Pet Milk remained, and eventually, the network managed to lure Del Monte to sign on as well. Nonetheless, sponsorship was still unstable. Both Kellogg's and Del Monte dropped out at the end of 1952, leaving only Pet. Beacon Wax came on board briefly for the first show in January before being quickly replaced by Johnson & Johnson (makers of Band-Aid plastic strips). With only two sponsors remaining (Pet and J&J), NBC was forced to pay for one-third of the expenses—which didn't bode well for the show's future.

Ratings were also very poor, as they had been for most of the show's run. The show could not compete in the ratings with CBS's new series The Jackie Gleason Show (the show ran for two years prior to premiering on CBS on DuMont under the name Cavalcade of Stars).

Bankhead and Jessel were not asked to return for the fourth season, nor was Durante.

The third-season finale aired on April 18, 1953.

=== Season Four ===
At the end of the 1952-1953 season, it looked as though All Star Revue had finished its run. But when NBC's Saturday night comedy extravaganza Your Show of Shows decided to switch to a three-out-of-four weeks format, the network needed something to plug into the fourth week. All Star Revue got the nod and found itself back in business.

Because Show of Shows was ninety minutes long, an extra half-hour had to be tacked onto Revue to fill out the time slot. The plan was to retain the rotating hosts arrangement, with Hoagy Carmichael, Henie, Ethel Merman, and Noël Coward mentioned at various times as possible hosts. Martha Raye also returned for season four. But when Raye led off the season and scored big in the ratings, NBC decided to keep her coming back. The critics liked her as well, with writer-director Nat Hiken singled out as one of the major factors in the comedian's success.

By the start of 1954, after all but one of the episodes had been hosted by Raye, it was decided to change the name to The Martha Raye Show. This time, All Star Revue was gone for good.

The last episode of the series under the Revue title aired on December 26, 1953. The Martha Raye Show aired until 1956. Jimmy Durante also received a spin-off of the series, titled The Jimmy Durante Show, which ran until 1956.

== Crew ==
=== Directing staff ===
- Joseph Stanley
- Sid Smith
- Nat Hiken
- Grey Lockwood
- Ernest D. Glucksman
- James V. Kern
- Charles Isaacs
- Garry Simpson
- Tim Whelan
- Jim Jordan
- Sid Kuller
- Mortimer Offner
- Dick Berger
- Dee Englebach
- Buzz Kulik

=== Production staff ===
==== Producers ====
- Joe Santley
- Karl Hoffenberg
- Ernest D. Glucksman
- Leo Morgan
- Bill Harmon
- Norman Zeno
- Al Capstaff
- Dean Elliott
- Dee Englebach
- James V. Kern
- Mortimer Offner

==== Associate producers ====
- Karl Hoffenberg
- Phil Cohen

==== Executive producers ====
- Samuel Fuller
- Peter Barnum
- Harold Kemp

==== Other ====
- Joe Bigelow (production supervisor/production manager)
- Peter Barnum (production supervisor for NBC)
- Harold Kemp (production supervisor for NBC)
- William Harmon (associate production supervisor/production manager)

=== Writing staff ===
- Ben Blue
- Matt Brooks
- Sam Carlton
- Dick Chevillat
- Eddie Davis
- Stanley Davis
- Sid Dorfman
- Jack Elinson
- Dee Englebach
- Hal Fimberg
- Marvin Fisher
- George Foster
- Billy Friedberg
- Larry Gelbart
- Ernest D. Glucksman
- Hal Goodman
- Mort Green
- Paul Henning
- Nat Hiken
- Charles Isaacs
- George Jessel
- Larry Klein
- Sid Kuller
- Charles Lee
- Virginia Lee
- Mannie Manheim
- Larry Markes
- Elon Packard
- Bob Schiller
- Jerry Seelen
- Danny Shapiro
- Ray Singer
- Ben Starr
- Norman Sullivan
- Snag Werris

== Broadcast history ==
NOTE: The most frequent time slot for the series in bold text.

- Wednesday at 8:00-9:00 pm on NBC: October 4, 1950–July 18, 1951
- **Saturday at 8:00-9:00 pm on NBC: September 18, 1951–April 18, 1953**
- Saturday at 9:00-10:30 pm on NBC: October 3, 1953–December 26, 1953

=== All Star Summer Revue ===
- Saturday at 8:00-9:00 pm on NBC

== Ratings ==
Season	Rank	Rating	References
1950-1951	Not in the top 30		
1951-1952	#20	36.3 (tied with Dragnet)	
1952-1953	#26	**N/A**	
1953	Not in the top 30		

== Theme music ==
Four Star Revue used several different themes during its run especially for the first two seasons of the series. This was mainly done in part to distinguish between the four celebrities; Wynn, Thomas, Durante, and Carson, and any one episode that a celebrity would host.

Theme one (for Danny Thomas): "Danny Thomas Theme"

Composer: Jack Mason

Theme two (for Jimmy Durante): "You Gotta Start Off Each Day with a Song"

Composer: Jimmy Durante

Theme three (for other comedians): "All-Star Original Music"

Composer: Jack Mason

Theme four (for Olsen and Johnson, et al.): "All-Star Opening Theme"

Composer: Milton DeLugg

== Awards and nominations ==
Year	Award	Result	Category	Recipient	Ref.
1951	Primetime Emmy Award	Nominated	Outstanding Variety Series		
1952	Primetime Emmy Award	Nominated	Outstanding Variety Series		
