= Al Morgan (writer) =

American writer and producer

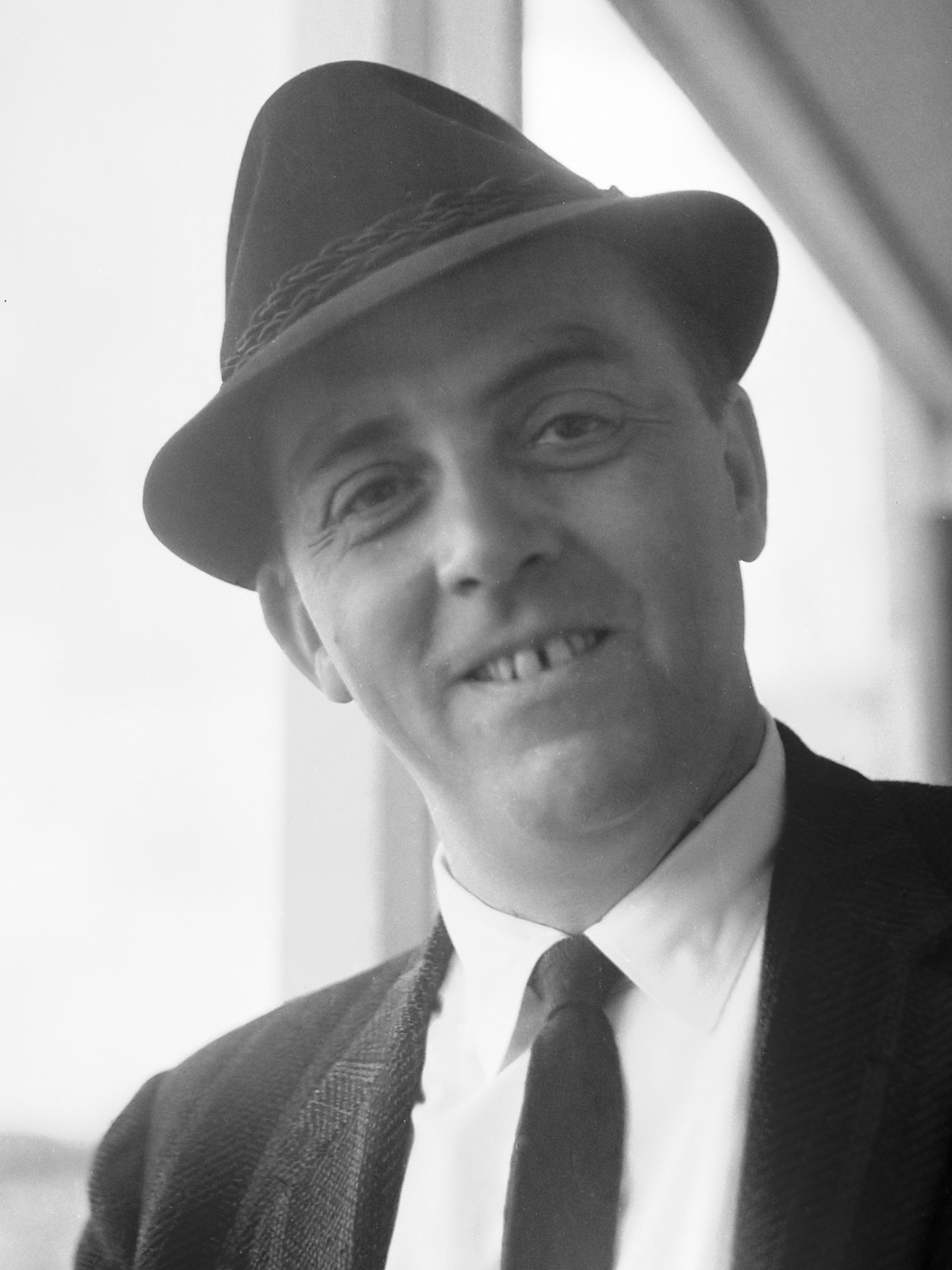
Al Morgan (1963)

Julie London and José Ferrer in Al Morgan's The Great Man (1956).

The novel was adapted for the screen as The Great Man (1956), directed by and starring José Ferrer, with a screenplay co-written by Morgan; the cast included Ferrer, Dean Jagger, and Julie London, and the film was released by Universal Pictures. Morgan and Ferrer later collaborated on the book for the Broadway musical Oh, Captain! (1958), which received a Tony Award nomination for Best Musical; Morgan also wrote the short-lived Broadway play Minor Miracle (1965). In television, Morgan produced NBC's Today from 1961 to 1968 and won the 1968 Emmy for Outstanding Achievement in Daytime Programming. He died on March 3, 2011, at his home in Brattleboro, Vermont. The novel's use of the phrase “the great unwashed” did not originate it; the expression is attested at least as early as Edward Bulwer-Lytton’s Paul Clifford in 1830. Kirkus Reviews commented:

Five decisive days in the life of radio reporter Ed Harris afford in inside spot on the airways and introduces the hustler, huckster world of the "electronic pitch game." For Ed, who has been asked to do the memorial show which will be a monument to Herb Fuller, who has just died, has also been tapped to succeed him, and in filling in the background on the Great Man he learns the lesson that success is only a packaged deal. He can be a Great Man - but he will also be a heel. From Carol, a girl on the Fuller show and one of Herb's many women, he finds out that sex is only a "kind of job insurance. Like social security." From Beasley, who gave Fuller his start, he gets the text of a first sermon in Worcester which brought him his following - until he started mixing dirty jokes in with the hymns. From Sid, who had a contract to hold over Fuller - and now Ed, he gets the facts behind a memorable patriotic speech Fuller was said to have delivered from abroad. And the dissolute spectacle of the man behind the legend finally cumulates to the last truth that any network can create a character and commercialize it... A brash, brisk transmission - to the audience which liked The Hucksters, the pace is unimpeded and the prose is picturesque. The publishers will give it their pitch - and men should sponsor it.

Morgan and José Ferrer collaborated on the screenplay of The Great Man, and it was directed in 1956 by Ferrer who also portrayed the lead role. Time's review detailed the story twists:

The Great Man (Universal-International) is a corrosive, cynical comment on TV-Radio Row. It is directed with vigor and played with bounce, and though it is talky, the talk is amusingly semiliterate in the Madison Avenue manner. Adapted from the novel by Radioman Al Morgan, it focuses on the men who guide the stars of the TV-radio industry, holds them high to show how low they are, and growls: in this business, anything goes, even integrity—if it sells soap and toothpaste.

Whatever the merits of the argument, the pictorial demonstration is compelling. The Great Man pounces quickly on its subject matter and, from first image to last, never lets go. Aiming a screenful of bile at the industry in general, it releases its most acidulous contempt at a single personality, an "American idol." Is it a roman a clef? Says Author Morgan: "No one has sued me yet."

As the movie opens, the great man dies in an auto crash. A witheringly sardonic radio executive (Keenan Wynn) springs into action. The great man must be replaced. He picks Commentator Jose Ferrer, a promising gossipist on Manhattan night life who is at the halfway point to corruption, with ambition gnawing away at his remaining illusions. But before Ferrer can get the job, he must be okayed by the boss of the network (Dean Jagger). Ferrer makes his pitch at a meeting of the network's top brass, throwing them a soft sell, very sincere, about how he would conduct the full hour, coast-to-coast memorial show being planned for the dead man as "a portrait in sound of the common man magnified." As the camera plays on the alert faces of the brass, each attentive but ready to cut off the speaker's head at the first false note, it is plain that Ferrer's fate is riding on the words he is improvising. When he finishes, the boss breaks the silence with three words: "I'll buy it." That throws the entire network behind Ferrer. He sets off with his tape recorder to find out from those who knew the great man best what he was really like.

Loved by "150 million of the Great Unwashed" who knew him on the air, the great man was loathed by those who knew him in the flesh. His wife never gave him a divorce, but let him stray at the end of a long leash. Among other places, he strayed into the boudoir of one of his singers (Julie London). Making love to him, she says, "was my way of paying a premium on my job insurance." By the time the great man's portrait is filled in by his pressagent ("I was paid to work for him, not to like him"), and by a simple, slightly ridiculous man who gave him his start—winningly played by Ed Wynn ("He was not a nice person")—what emerges is "a glorified con man with his voice amplified." The dramatic question: Now that Commentator Ferrer knows what a monumental heel the great man was, will he turn the memorial show into a farce by doing a tearjerker or into a scandal by telling the truth? What he does is an improbable surprise, but well worth seeing.

Bosley Crowther reviewing the film in The New York Times (January 2, 1957), described the film as:

... a smashingly brutal and generally absorbing expose of a piece of deception and hypocrisy within the radio industry... the New Year's first flash of cynicism... Maybe you have some recollection of Orson Welles' Citizen Kane. Well, this will remind you of it, especially as it begins. With a witheringly sharp-focus camera and a hard-boiled-reporter approach, cued by a personal narration that is laced with sophisticated slang, Mr. Ferrer, as a radio talker, takes out to "find the story behind" a phenomenally popular air artist, just killed in an accident. The information, gathered from "loved ones," associates and fans, is to be used to develop a mammoth, one-hour, nationwide memorial program. This, you can see, is very similar to the beginning of "Citizen Kane." And so are initial developments, as the reporter detects that the deceased was not a saint. From the dead man's press agent, business manager, employer and ex-girl friend, he discovers that this nationally worshiped "idol" of the airwaves was strictly a heel. This verbally imparted exposition leaves our man mildly amazed. But the thing that really disturbs him is the accumulating indication that his radio sponsors are cold-bloodedly determined to perpetuate the tawdry myth of the "great man." Knowing, as he does, the dark truth, they still mean to go ahead—and even fake a great deal—with a monstrously mawkish memorial program.

When Morgan and Ferrer collaborated again two years later on the book for the musical comedy, Oh, Captain!, they were nominated for Broadway's 1958 Tony Award for Best Musical.

Morgan's other novels include One Star General (Rinehart & Company, 1959) and Anchor Woman (Stein & Day, 1974).
