= The Man in the Funny Suit =

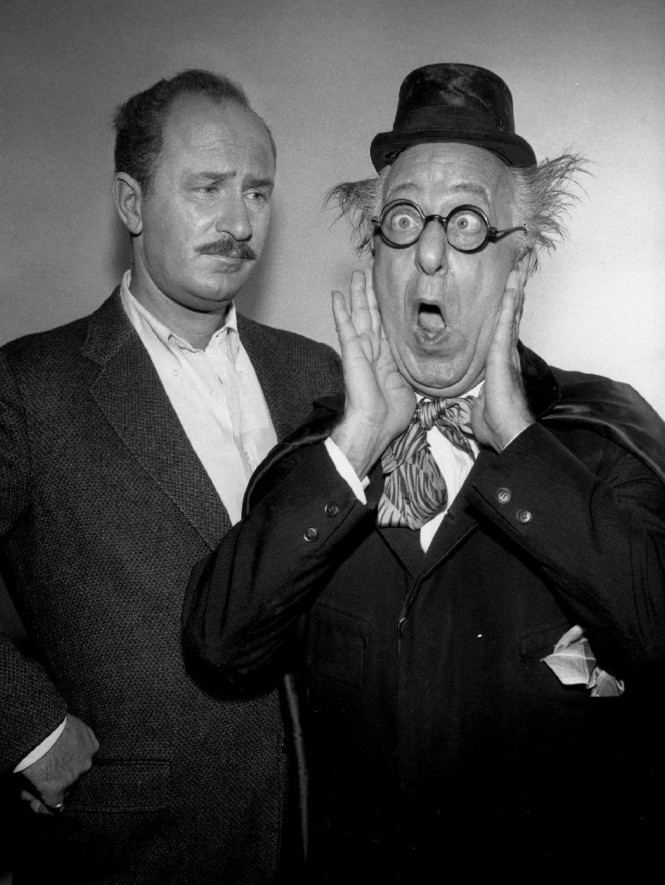
Keenan and Ed Wynn are seen in this photo from the program.

The Man in the Funny Suit is a television drama, originally broadcast on 15 April 1960 on Westinghouse Desilu Playhouse, detailing the agony endured by actor Keenan Wynn while helping his co-star, father and comedian Ed Wynn, play a serious role in the original television production of Rod Serling's Requiem for a Heavyweight, which had aired in 1956 on Playhouse 90.

Requiem was the elder Wynn's first dramatic role after decades of comedy. When Wynn flubbed a line or was uncertain of how to proceed, he would fall back on his old comedic catchphrases and jokes, mostly out of habit. As Requiem was an intense drama scheduled for live broadcast, this caused much consternation and worry among the staff and cast. When the time came for the show, however, Ed Wynn surprised everyone with his flawlessly heartfelt performance.

Both Wynns, Ned Glass, Maxie Rosenbloom, Playhouse 90 announcer Dick Joy, Ralph Nelson, Serling, and Red Skelton play themselves. Ralph Nelson, in addition to appearing in the production as himself, also wrote and directed The Man in the Funny Suit. Nelson was the director of both the 1956 original Playhouse 90 television staging of Requiem for a Heavyweight and the later 1962 movie version, which stars Jackie Gleason and Mickey Rooney in Keenan and Ed Wynn's roles, respectively.

== Cast ==
- Keenan Wynn as himself
- Ed Wynn as himself
- Rod Serling as himself
- Maxine Stuart as Sharley Wynn
- Ralph Nelson as himself
- Red Skelton as himself
- Bob Mathias as himself
- William Roerick as Martin Manulis
- Max Rosenbloom as himself / Slapsie Maxie
- Seymour Berns as Skelton's Director
- Robin Blake as Script Girl
- Joey Faye as Latecomer
- Ned Glass as himself / Ed Wynn's Understudy
- Charlene Glazer as Secretary
- Drew Handley as Assistant Director
- Robert H. Harris as Technical Director
- Richard Joy as himself / Announcer
- Bill Walker as Porter
