= Laurie Anders =

American actress (1922-1992)

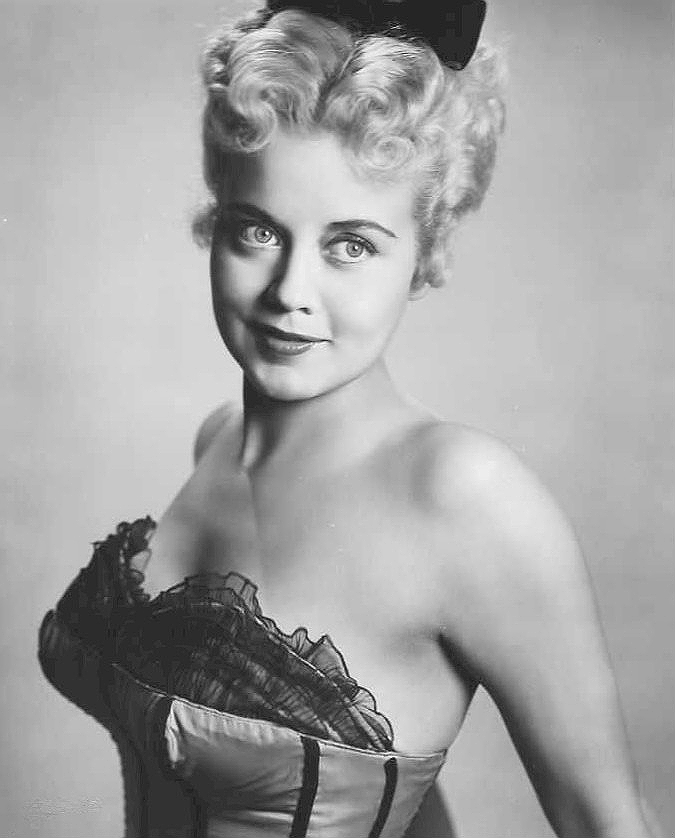
- Anders in 1953
- Born: January 16, 1922; Casper, Wyoming, US
- Died: October 5, 1992 (aged 70); Los Angeles, California, US
- Other name: LoRaye Raddatz
- Occupations: Actress, singer
- Spouse: Leslie Raddatz (m. 1974)

Laurie Anders (January 16, 1922 – October 5, 1992) was an American actress and singer, best known for her work with television personality Ken Murray.

== Birth and early life ==
Anders was born and grew up on a ranch in Casper, Wyoming. Her first employment was as a stenographer and secretary at a labor union. Still in Wyoming, she joined a country band as a singer. She relocated to California in the 1940s, eventually finding her way to Ciro's nightclub in Los Angeles as a cigarette girl. She was noticed there by Ken Murray, who signed her to be part of his "Blackouts" traveling production. She continued with Murray when he moved to television.

== Acting career ==
Anders was a regular on the variety program The Ken Murray Show for its full run, from January 1950 until June 1953. She began the show as part of the "Glamourlovelies" female dance chorus featured on the program. Previously unknown, she was given a solo number in the production number "Oh, Susanna". This song, entitled I Like the Wide Open Spaces generated instant impact among viewers. From that point on, Anders was billed as the "glamour cowboy" in promotional material, and the song was repeatedly plugged. Anders was showcased on the Arthur Godfrey's show, singing the song as a duet with Godfrey, where response was so positive that advance orders of 50,000 units were reportedly received for a recording that had not even been made yet. Previously television shows had been unwilling to air a song unknown to audiences, in fear of audience displacement. Anders' performance demonstrated beyond doubt that an unknown performer, singing an unknown song, could effect significant influence on the current musical landscape. From that time on, television was used as a promotional vehicle for new artists and compositions.

Anders starred in a 1953 western comedy motion picture entitled The Marshal's Daughter. The United Artists film co-starred Ken Murray and western silent-film star Hoot Gibson and was directed by William Berke.

== Singing career ==
Together with Arthur Godfrey, Anders had a top-20 hit with the song I Like the Wide Open Spaces, partially composed by Ken Murray which was released by Columbia Records in 1951. This recording placed in the top-5 of Billboard's "Disc Jockeys Picks". In the mid 1950s, she toured as a featured performer in WLW's "Midwestern Hayride."

=== Discography ===
Year	Title	b-side	Label/Catalog #	Billboard Top 100 Chart	Notes
1951	I Like the Wide Open Spaces	Love Is the Reason	Columbia 39404	13	
1954	Sure Fire Kisses	"T" for Texas	PIC 0010	-	

== Later life ==
By the late 1950s, Anders had ceased working as an actress. She became highly proficient at jujitsu. In 1974 she married Leslie Raddatz, a publicist, and became known by the name LoRaye Raddatz. She died of cancer on October 5, 1992, at age 70, at her home in the Tarzana, Los Angeles neighborhood.
