= The Marshal's Daughter =

1953 film by William Berke

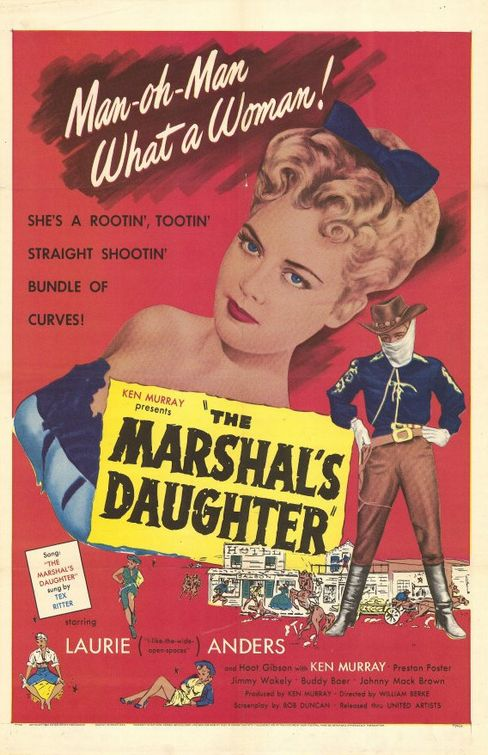
- Theatrical release poster
- Directed by: William Berke
- Screenplay by: Bob Duncan
- Produced by: Ken Murray
- Starring: Laurie Anders; Hoot Gibson; Ken Murray; Preston Foster; Johnny Mack Brown
- Cinematography: Jack MacKenzie
- Edited by: Reg Browne
- Music by: Darrell Calker
- Production company: Harris/Murray
- Distributed by: United Artists
- Release date: June 26, 1953
- Running time: 71 minutes
- Country: United States
- Language: English
- Budget: $165,000

The Marshal's Daughter is a 1953 American Western comedy film directed by William Berke, produced by Ken Murray and written by Bob Duncan, the latter two appearing in the film. The film stars Laurie Anders, Hoot Gibson, Preston Foster and Johnny Mack Brown. The film was released on June 26, 1953, by United Artists.

== Plot ==
After his wife's death, Ben Dawson retires and forms a traveling medicine show. His infant daughter Laurie grows up to be a sharpshooter and performer in the show.

A banker named Anderson is behind a criminal scheme cheating ranchers out of their money. He hires notorious gunslinger Trigger Gans for protection. Ben realizes that Gans was the one who killed his wife.

Laurie is glad that rancher Russ Mason is in love with her but, knowing something must be done about the unlawful deeds going on, disguises herself as "El Coyote" and conducts a form of vigilante justice. She ultimately fights Anderson one-on-one in a canyon. Victorious, she sheds her costume upon returning, but Russ spots it and realizes her secret identity, but her father does not.

== Cast ==
- Laurie Anders as Laurie Dawson
- Hoot Gibson as Marshal Ben Dawson
- Ken Murray as 'Smiling Billy' Murray
- Preston Foster as Preston Foster
- Johnny Mack Brown as Johnny Mack Brown
- Jimmy Wakely as Jimmy Wakely
- Buddy Baer as Buddy Baer
- Harry Lauter as Russ Mason
- Robert Bray as Anderson
- Bob Duncan as Trigger Gans
- Pamela Ann Murray as Baby Laurie Dawson
- Tex Ritter as Background Singer
