= Bill and Coo =

1948 film by Dean Riesner

- Directed by: Dean Riesner
- Written by: Dean Riesner; Royal Foster
- Produced by: Ken Murray
- Cinematography: Jack Marta
- Edited by: Harold Minter
- Music by: David Buttolph
- Distributed by: Republic Pictures
- Release date: March 28, 1948
- Running time: 61 minutes
- Country: United States
- Language: English

Bill and Coo is a 1948 film directed by Dean Riesner, filmed in Trucolor, and conceived to showcase George Burton's trained birds (Burton's Birds). The 61-minute live-action film stars many types of birds, including budgies (commonly known in the US as parakeets) and lovebirds. The film also features other trained animals, including cats, dogs and a crow. Except for three humans (producer Ken Murray, bird trainer George Burton, and Elizabeth Walters) in a short set-up segment before the opening credits, the film features an all-animal cast. The film was shot on the world's second smallest film set, a miniature village built onto a 15 by 30 ft (4.6 by 9.1 m) tabletop.

The film received an Honorary Academy Award from the Academy of Motion Picture Arts and Sciences "In which artistry and patience blended in a novel and entertaining use of the medium of motion pictures." It is also one of the first films to be released to cinemas on slow-burning cellulose acetate safety film instead of the dangerously flammable nitrate stock used up until then. Initially, projectionists reported film damage due to the acetate base being less 'slippery' than that of nitrate (celluloid) based film. Before long it was found that a thin coating of wax applied along the film edges solved this problem. The copyright on the film lapsed and is in the public domain.

== Plot ==
The plot of the film is that the birds live in a fictional, peaceful town named Chirpendale. A crow arrives known as the Black Menace. As his name suggests, the Black Menace terrorizes the town. The story follows the adventures of the hero Bill, a cab driver, as he tries to save Coo and the rest of the town's inhabitants from certain destruction.

== Cast ==
- Burton's Birds as various characters
- Jimmy the Crow as the Black Menace

== See also ==
- Pretty Little Baby (Connie Francis song)
