= Hollywood Without Make-Up =

- Directed by: Rudy Behlmer; Loring d'Usseau; Ken Murray (uncredited)
- Written by: Royal Foster
- Produced by: Ken Murray (producer)
- Starring: Ken Murray; Eddie Albert; June Allyson
- Cinematography: Ken Murray
- Edited by: Reg Brown (editorial supervisor)
- Music by: George Stoll
- Release date: 1963
- Running time: 50 min
- Country: USA
- Language: English

Hollywood Without Make-Up is a 1963 American film produced by Ken Murray and directed by Rudy Behlmer, Loring d'Usseau and Ken Murray (uncredited). A sequel, Hollywood: My Home Town, was produced in 1965.

== Plot ==
The film consists of archive footage of famous Hollywood stars, mostly home movies by Ken Murray, showing the stars as themselves instead of playing a role in front of the camera. William Randolph Hearst and his family are shown at Hearst Castle, including its zoo that included many species of wild animals. Interestingly, the film incorrectly refers to Hearst "conducting business with his secretary." The woman standing next to Hearst in that clip is Julia Morgan in her trademark hat, holding architectural sketches and notes. Ms. Morgan became famous for spending much of her architectural career designing and building Hearst Castle. She had a particular talent for designing swimming pools, with two spectacular examples at Hearst Castle. The filmmakers' daughters went on set with Walt Disney for the shooting of a film. Tom Mix can be seen driving the 1937 Cord 812 Phaeton in which he was killed just two weeks later in Arizona. Candid images are included, such as those of Mary Pickford, Lucille Ball and Rory Calhoun. The film ends with images of Marilyn Monroe.

== Cast ==
- Ken Murray as himself / narrator

The film contains archival footage of:

- Eddie Albert
- June Allyson
- George K. Arthur
- Mary Astor
- Lew Ayres
- Max Baer
- Lucille Ball
- Richard Barthelmess
- Rex Bell
- Edgar Bergen
- Sally Blane
- Paul Block
- Humphrey Bogart
- John Boles
- Pat Boone
- Eddie Borden
- Hobart Bosworth
- Clara Bow
- William Boyd
- Fanny Brice
- Paul Brooks
- Joe E. Brown
- Johnny Mack Brown
- Virginia Bruce
- Rory Calhoun
- Wanda Cantlon
- Leo Carrillo
- Charles Chaplin
- Lew Cody
- William Collier Jr.
- Russ Columbo
- Gary Cooper
- Jackie Cooper
- Jeanne Crain
- Robert Cummings
- Linda Darnell
- Marion Davies
- Joan Davis
- Olivia de Havilland
- Dolores del Río
- Cecil B. DeMille
- Jack Dempsey
- Walt Disney
- Kirk Douglas
- Marie Dressler
- Josephine Dunn
- Irene Dunne
- Stuart Erwin
- Ruth Etting
- Douglas Fairbanks Jr.
- Douglas Fairbanks
- Charles Farrell
- Todd Fisher
- Errol Flynn
- Joan Fontaine
- Glenn Ford
- Clark Gable
- Greta Garbo
- Reginald Gardiner
- Amadeo Giannini
- Hoot Gibson
- John Gilbert
- Cary Grant
- Alan Hale
- Oliver Hardy
- William Randolph Hearst
- Jean Hersholt
- William Holden
- Bob Hope
- Hedda Hopper
- Walter Huston
- Sam Jaffe
- Van Johnson
- Buck Jones
- Arthur Lake
- Patricia Lake
- Hope Lange
- Charles Laughton
- Stan Laurel
- Gertrude Lawrence
- Mervyn LeRoy
- Charles Lindbergh
- Carole Lombard
- Nick Lucas
- William Lundigan
- Fred MacMurray
- Jayne Mansfield
- George Marshall
- Herbert Marshall
- Chico Marx
- Groucho Marx
- Harpo Marx
- Joel McCrea
- Victor McLaglen
- Adolphe Menjou
- Mayo Methot
- Tom Mix and his horse Tony
- Marilyn Monroe
- Frank Morgan
- Wayne Morris
- Betty Lou Murray
- Janie Murray
- Pamela Ann Murray
- Martha O'Driscoll
- Tommy Owen
- Jean Parker
- Louella Parsons
- Mary Pickford
- Dick Powell
- Tyrone Power
- George Raft
- Gregory Ratoff
- Donna Reed
- Debbie Reynolds
- Buddy Rogers
- Charles Ruggles
- Albert Schweitzer
- George Seaton
- Norma Shearer
- George Stevens
- Lewis Stone
- Margaret Sullavan
- Robert Taylor
- William T. Tilden
- George Tobias
- Spencer Tracy
- Helen Twelvetrees
- Lupe Vélez
- Jimmy Walker
- John Wayne
- Johnny Weissmuller
- Mae West
- Claire Windsor
- Robert Woolsey
- Jane Wyman
