= The Ken Murray Show =

- Title screenshot from October 14, 1950 episode.
- Genre: Variety
- Starring: Ken Murray
- Narrated by: Nelson Case (1950-52)
- Country of origin: United States
- Original language: English

Original release
- Network: CBS
- Release: January 7, 1950 – June 21, 1953

The Ken Murray Show is an American music and comedy television show on CBS Television hosted by Ken Murray that ran from 1950 to 1953.

== Show ==
An established entertainer and vaudeville regular, Murray had hosted comedy and variety series on CBS radio in the past. But his Blackouts racy stage variety show ran in Hollywood for years in the 1940s and made him quite popular before the TV show debuted in January 1950. Anheuser-Busch was the primary sponsor. It began as an every-other-week show broadcast from 8-9pm on Saturday nights, alternating with the 54th Street Revue. The show became weekly in the fall of 1950, and ran in that format through the end of the 1951–52 season in June 1952.

The New York-based show featured popular guest stars and had an elaborate Hollywood and Vine set, and a large cast of singers and female dancers. Murray would open the show and do transitions between bits, often with a cigar in hand. Darla Hood (best known as Darla in Our Gang as a child actor) was a regular in 1950–51. Laurie Anders began as one of the "Glamourlovelies" women of the show and emerged as a featured player after performing the song I Like the Wide Open Spaces and getting instant impact. The inclusion of many "glamorous"-looking women on the show was in keeping with Murray's formula for Blackouts. A young Stanley Kubrick photographed the show's mass audition for "beautiful girls - no experience necessary" for Look magazine in 1950.

The show opened with a scene of the sponsor's Budweiser Clydesdales galloping along and pulling an Anheuser Busch wagon. Live commercial segments during the show would include Murray and a guest drinking Budweiser.

Episodes often had a dramatic scene from a play as one segment. For example, the first episode of the show on January 7, 1950. had a scene from the popular 1949 play Death of a Salesman, with the Broadway actors Gene Lockhart and Alan Hewitt from the ongoing show playing their roles.

A tentative plan to move the show to Tuesday nights in late December 1952 was rejected, thinking it would be unfair to Murray to have to move from his established Saturday slot to compete with Milton Berle and Bishop Fulton J. Sheen. Instead, the show returned in February 1953 in a 30-minute format on alternate Sunday nights at 9:30pm, switching weeks with The Alan Young Show under the joint title of Time to Smile. This last season, which ran from February to June 1953, was broadcast from Hollywood. The Time to Smile format and content got mixed reviews at best, and the show was dropped by its sponsor after the season, in favor of a new show, The Man Behind the Badge. Anheuser-Busch also bought the St. Louis Cardinals in early 1953, so cutting the show's sponsorship fee may also have been related to that purchase.

Marilyn Monroe's first ever appearance on television occurred on the show in March 1953, a segment filmed at the premiere of Call Me Madam.

The Nielsen ratings (the service's TV ratings debuted in 1950) rated the show as the 28th most watched show for the 1950–51 season (fall 1950-spring 1951).

== Awards ==
The show was nominated for the Emmy for Best Variety Show, losing at the 3d Emmy Awards in January 1951 to The Alan Young Show. The show was the first to win a Freedom Foundation Award.
