= Swing It Soldier =

1941 film directed by Harold Young

- Theatrical release poster
- Directed by: Harold Young
- Screenplay by: Dorcas Cochran; Arthur V. Jones
- Produced by: Joseph Gershenson
- Starring: Ken Murray; Frances Langford; Don Wilson; Blanche Stewart; Elvia Allman; Hanley Stafford; Susan Miller; Irving Lee; Iris Adrian
- Cinematography: Elwood Bredell
- Edited by: Ted J. Kent
- Music by: Reginald LeBorg; Charles Previn
- Production company: Universal Pictures
- Distributed by: Universal Pictures
- Release date: November 7, 1941
- Running time: 66 minutes
- Country: United States
- Language: English

Swing It Soldier is a 1941 American musical comedy film directed by Harold Young and starring Ken Murray, Frances Langford, Don Wilson, Blanche Stewart, Elvia Allman, Hanley Stafford, Susan Miller, Irving Lee and Iris Adrian. The screenplay was written by Dorcas Cochran and Arthur V. Jones. The film was released on November 7, 1941, by Universal Pictures.

== Plot ==
Jerry Traynor, who had been drafted into the army, is released from military service and returns to his job at a radio station. His army buddy has asked him to take care of his pregnant wife while he is absent but Jerry confuses her twin sister for her while trying to promote her career as a singer.

== Cast ==
- Ken Murray as Jerry Traynor
- Frances Langford as Patricia Loring / Evelyn Loring Waters
- Don Wilson as Brad Saunders
- Blanche Stewart as Brenda
- Elvia Allman as Cobina
- Hanley Stafford as J. Horace Maxwellton
- Susan Miller as Clementine
- Irving Lee as Senor Lee
- Iris Adrian as Dena Maxwellton
- Lewis Howard as Bill Waters
- Thurston Hall as Oscar Simms
- Kitty O'Neil as Mrs. Simms
- Lew Valentine as Dr. Browning
- Peter Sullivan as Elevator Boy
- Tom Dugan as Sergeant
- Kenny Stevens as Kenny Stevens
- Louis DaPron as Solo Dancer
- Skinnay Ennis as Orchestra Leader

== Bibliography ==
- Fetrow, Alan G. Feature Films, 1940–1949: a United States Filmography. McFarland, 1994.
