= The Alan Young Show =

American radio and television series

- Genre: Variety, comedy
- Written by: Leo Solomon; David R. Schwartz; Alan Young
- Starring: Alan Young
- Country of origin: United States
- Original language: English
- No. of seasons: 3

Production
- Producers: Ralph Levy; Richard Linkroum

Original release
- Network: CBS
- Release: April 6, 1950 – June 21, 1953

The Alan Young Show is an American radio and television series presented in diverse formats over a nine-year period and starring English-born comedian Alan Young.

== Radio ==
The series began on NBC Radio, running June 28, 1944 - September 20, 1944, as a summer replacement for Eddie Cantor's program with Sal Hepatica as sponsor. Young's character was "a bashful young man". The show also featured vocalist Bea Wain, with music by Peter Van Steeden.

From October 3, 1944, to June 28, 1946, the program was on ABC Radio with Young's girlfriend Betty portrayed by Jean Gillespie and Doris Singleton and with Ed Begley as Betty's father. Will Glickman and Jay Sommers were the writers.

The program returned to NBC September 20, 1946, - May 30, 1947, with Ipana as sponsor. It was off in 1948. When it returned to NBC January 11, 1949 - July 5, 1949, Louise Erickson played Betty and Jim Backus was heard as wealthy and snobbish playboy Hubert Updike III. Don Wilson was the announcer, and George Wylie provided the music. Helen Mack was the producer and director.

== Television ==
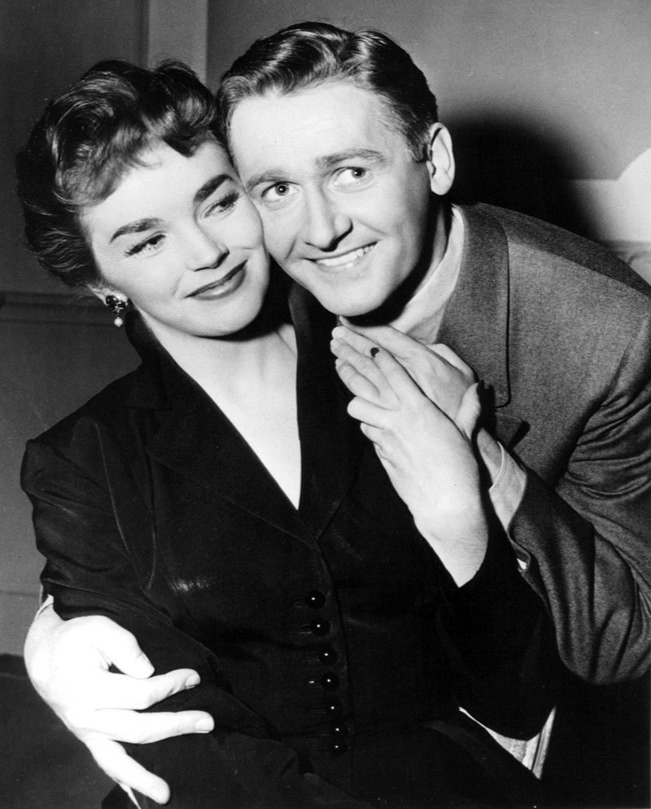
Young and Dawn Addams, 1953.

Young had his first television program on the West Coast beginning on March 14, 1950, and the network version of The Alan Young Show debuted on CBS on April 6, 1950, as a variety, sketch comedy show. Each program typically contained a monologue, one or two songs by a vocalist and two skits.

The show went on hiatus after its March 27, 1952, episode. When it returned for its final season on February 15, 1953, the tone and format of the show changed into the more conventional sitcom, with Young playing a bank teller.The show alternated weeks with Ken Murray's The Ken Murray Show under the title Time to Smile. In the last two weeks of the season, the format returned to its earlier style, but it was cancelled at the end of the season. It ended on June 21, 1953.

In 1951, The Alan Young Show received the Primetime Emmy Award for Outstanding Variety Series, and Young won the Best Actor Emmy Award.

=== Personnel ===
Regulars on the first version included Polly Bergen (in her national TV debut), Ben Wright, Joseph Kearns, Mabel Paige, Phillips Tead and the Lud Gluskin Orchestra. Nina Bara was also a featured comedienne. On the second version, Dawn Addams played Young's girlfriend and Melville Faber portraying his son. John Heistand was the announcer. Lud Gluskin directed the orchestra.

Ralph Levy and Dick Linkroum produced and directed, and Joe Connolly and Bob Mosher produced and wrote for the program. Alan Dinehart and Edward Bernds also directed. Other writers included Young, Leo Solomon, Dave Schwartz, Nate Monaster, and Stanley Shapiro.

=== Critical response ===
A review of the first three CBS episodes in The New York Times said that Young "had some excellent sketches" in the first two, "But on the third show, when his writers let him down, Mr. Young was at very loose ends ..." The review complimented Young's "sense of timing in the delivery of his lines" but added that his "dependence on the script is also evident in his repetitive opening monologues, which are apt to seem forced." The production, props, and settings received compliments.

A review of the program's September 28, 1950, episode in the trade publication Billboard called Young "one of the most original performers in video". However, the reviewer questioned the use of two long skits when Young's work came across better in shorter segments.

== Cast ==
- Ilene Woods as Singing Neighbor
