= Jaime Yankelevich =

Argentine engineer and businessman

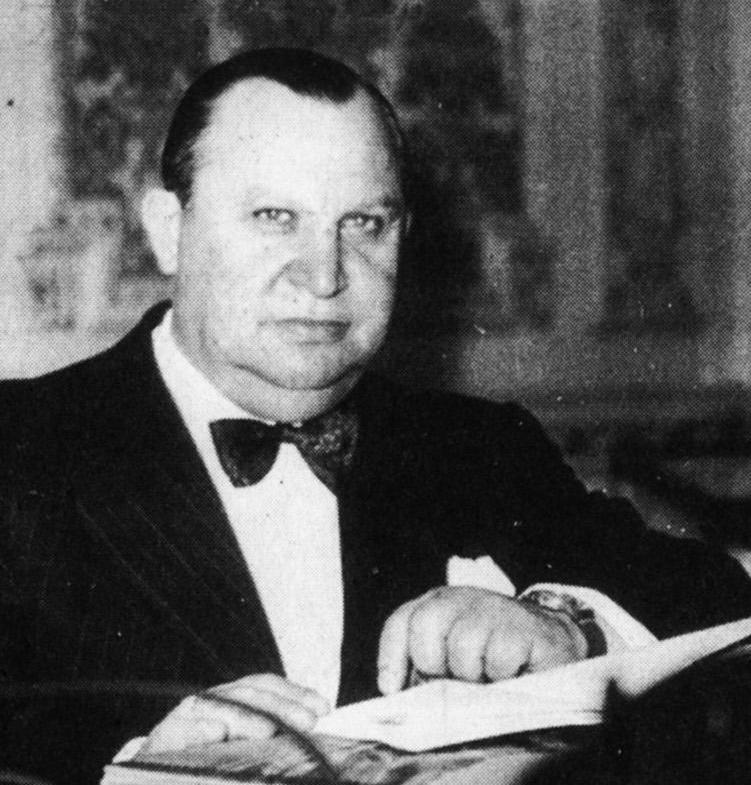
Jaime Yankelevich

Jaime Yankelevich (13 March 1896 – 25 February 1952) was an Argentine engineer and businessman who was a pioneer in the development of his country's radio and television media.

== Life and times ==
Jaime Yankelevich was born into a Jewish family in Bulgaria, in 1896. His parents emigrated to Argentina in 1899 and settled in the province of Entre Ríos. The Yankelevich family relocated to Buenos Aires in 1914, where Jaime found work in one of the city's many theatres as a backstage hand. Trained as a theatre electrician, Yankelevich eventually opened an electrical supply store in the Constitución section of Buenos Aires. The store specialized in radio valves and other equipment, which became in great demand following the advent of the medium in 1920. Increasingly skilled in his field, he created many of these parts by hand.

The sale of a failing early radio station gave Yankelevich the opportunity to pursue his interest directly and in 1924, he purchased the ailing broadcaster. Known at the time as "LR3" (for its being the third station on the dial), Yankelevich pioneered the use of artistic contracts in radio, by which artists were paid a salary in return for his commitment to limit broadcasts of their work to live performances in lieu of recordings. The practice made the newly christened "Radio Belgrano" the most coveted employer in Argentine radio and by the 1930s, it enjoyed the nation's highest ratings. Growing acquisitions allowed Yankelevich to form the Radio Belgrano chain in 1937. Venturing into other areas, he co-produced Two Friends and One Love, a 1937 romantic comedy film, with Francisco Canaro, a well-known Argentine tango bandleader. Later that decade, he pioneered late-night broadcasting in Argentina, and in 1942, united numerous low-wattage radio stations into the Argentine Broadcasting Chain, which preserved or reopened a number of smaller, local stations nationwide.

The 1946 election of President Juan Perón resulted in the nationalization of industries producing nearly half the nation's goods and services, including the three radio networks that controlled most of Argentina's stations, El Mundo, Splendid and Belgrano.

Yankelevich had opposed the 1943 coup d'état, and the advent of one of its most recognizable figures (Perón) to the Presidency antagonized the impresario. Allowing critical commentary of Perón's inaugural address following the event, Radio Belgrano was suspended by government order for one month. The experience persuaded Yankelevich to sell Radio Belgrano to the state for US$1.5 million in 1947. The chain's management was left to Yankelevich, who continued to receive the greater part of the chain's net income (Argentine radio's most profitable), and in turn, the Perón regime dictated content and vetted personnel and performers.

A personal tragedy motivated Yankelevich to pioneer another, then-inexistent medium in Argentina. The death in 1949 of his son Miguel, who professed fascination with the growth of television in the United States, led the grieving father to purchase the necessary equipment for its introduction in Argentina. Discussing the authorization for the project with Perón's Communications Minister, Oscar Nicolini, Yankelevich persuaded the reluctant bureaucrat by positing that:

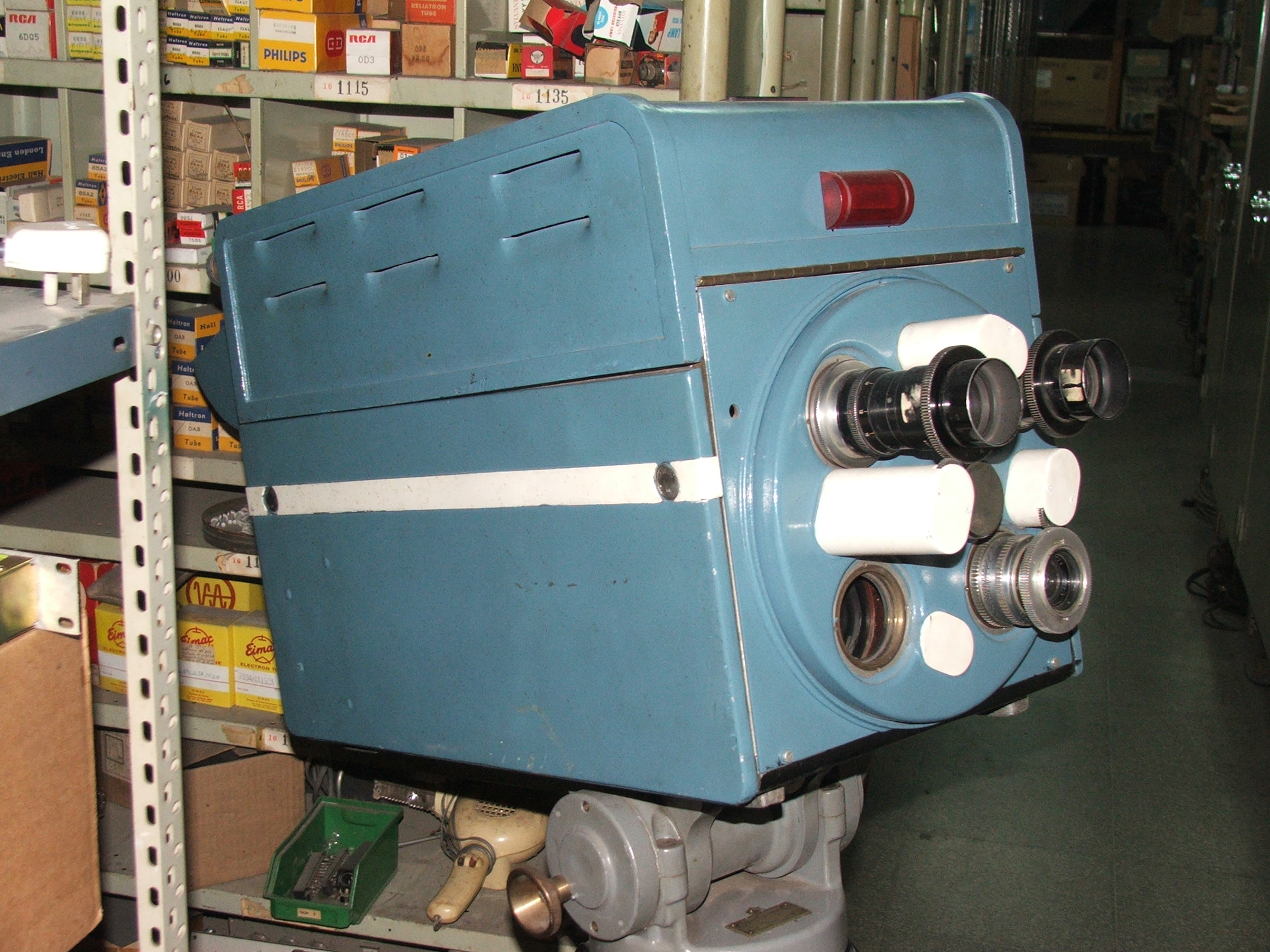
One of the DuMont cameras imported by Yankelevich

The money needed to invest in this project does not concern me, for no amount of millions would be too much!

Importing DuMont television cameras and ITT transmitters, he and engineers James Ballantine, Máximo Koeble and Alejandro Spataro prepared the downtown studio and installed a 50 meters (160 feet) antenna over the 23-story Ministry of Public Works (then Buenos Aires' second-tallest building). Personally operating the antenna, Yankelevich and his team achieved the nation's first television broadcast in 1951, reaching 40 blocks around. Emitting programs through the only TV station in Argentina at the time (Channel 7), all programming on the station was produced by Radio Belgrano Televisión, providing Yankelevich a similarly profitable relationship with the state as the one his radio chain had enjoyed since 1947.

Yankelevich's failing health led to his hospitalization a few months later, and he died in 1952 at the age of 56. Among the items in his hospital room, was a television set.
