= The Great Man =

1956 film

- Film poster
- Directed by: José Ferrer
- Screenplay by: Al Morgan; José Ferrer
- Based on: The Great Man; 1955 novel by Al Morgan
- Produced by: Aaron Rosenberg
- Starring: José Ferrer; Dean Jagger; Julie London
- Cinematography: Harold Lipstein
- Edited by: Albrecht Joseph; Sherman Todd
- Music by: Herman Stein
- Production company: Universal Pictures
- Distributed by: Universal Pictures
- Release date: December 1956 (United States)
- Running time: 92 minutes
- Country: United States
- Language: English

The Great Man is a 1956 American drama film directed by and starring José Ferrer. The screenplay was written by Ferrer and Al Morgan from Morgan's novel of the same name. It was loosely based on the controversial career of Arthur Godfrey, a beloved TV and radio host whose image had been tarnished by a number of cast firings and Godfrey's contentious battles with the press.

== Plot ==
Joe Harris is a popular, established local radio news reporter covering Broadway entertainment with a wise-guy attitude. Herb Fuller is the network's undisputed star. When Fuller dies in an auto accident, Philip Carleton, president of the Amalgamated Broadcasting Network, assigns Harris to prepare a memorial extravaganza, including an elaborate public viewing of Fuller's coffin and a special memorial show featuring interviews with Fuller's radio cast, the "Fuller Family" (based on Arthur Godfrey's cast of "Little Godfreys"), and others who knew him. Carleton dangles a chance at Harris becoming Fuller's replacement if he succeeds.

Assisted by network public relations man Nick Cellentano, Harris is intrigued by odd comments at the public viewing, including some from various individuals who attend strictly out of boredom and are indifferent to Fuller.

Harris meets Sid Moore, Fuller's longtime producer, who offers his assistance while realizing Harris is in line to become Fuller's successor. Aided by his secretary Ginny, Harris discovers Fuller was an alcoholic and an unethical womanizing egomaniac who became a star in spite of it. He is visited by Paul Beaseley, owner of a tiny Christian radio station in New England, who first hired Fuller, impressed by his inspirational poetry, and treated him as a son, only to discover Fuller's dark side.

Harris's investigations reveal Fuller's relationship with Carol Larson, the alcoholic singer on his show, and conflicts of interest involving his relationship with various song publishers whose songs were performed on Fuller's program. Fuller bandleader Eddie Brand (played by real-life bandleader Russ Morgan), hoping to remain on what he suspects will become Harris's show, dutifully records an artificially sincere sound bite regarding Fuller.

Moore signs Harris to a contract, then reveals more of Fuller's escapades. Carleton privately warns Harris of Moore's duplicitous nature, telling the newsman that the network will spin his chances of becoming Fuller's successor negatively so that Moore agrees to release him from the contract, adding that if Harris cannot secure a release, the network will turn elsewhere. Amassing the research into a script, Harris has to choose between praising the beloved, amusing and warm-hearted Fuller the public saw or unmasking the phony beneath the image.

Harris makes up his mind as the broadcast starts, throwing away his prepared script to tell the truth about Herb Fuller. As Carleton and Moore listen in, Moore realizes what Harris is about to do. He rips up Harris's contract and demands that Carleton stop the broadcast. Seeing that Moore has done precisely what he had hoped for, Carleton refuses to stop the broadcast, explaining that he can market Harris as a man of principle and honesty to the public just as easily as his network marketed Fuller's phony image.

== Cast ==
- José Ferrer as Joe Harris
- Dean Jagger as Philip Carleton
- Keenan Wynn as Sid Moore
- Jim Backus as Nick Cellantano
- Julie London as Carol Larson
- Ed Wynn as Paul Beaseley
- Russ Morgan as Eddie Brand
- Joanne Gilbert as Ginny, Harris's secretary
- Barrie Chase as Sexy Secretary (uncredited)
- Edward Platt as Dr. O’Connor (as Edward C. Platt)
- Robert Foulk as Mike Jack, a radio engineer
- Lyle Talbot as Harry Connors
- Vinton Hayworth as Charley Carruthers
- Henny Backus as Mrs. Rieber
- Janie Alexander as Mary Browne
- Vikki Dougan as Marica, new receptionist
- Robert Schwartz as Mailboy
- Dorothy Abbott as 'American Airlines' Stewardess (uncredited)
- Adrienne Marden as Voice of Mrs. Fuller (uncredited)

== Arthur Godfrey ==
While the movie was based on the controversy surrounding Arthur Godfrey, whose real-life persona contrasted with his warm-hearted public demeanor, the fictional Fuller's failings differed greatly. Godfrey's controversies were mostly public, not private. Godfrey's womanizing was long-rumored but never confirmed, and he was not a heavy drinker like Fuller.

Godfrey's reputation for bullying members of his cast offstage was one exception. That situation, originally private, became public with the October 19, 1953, on-air firing of singer and popular Godfrey show discovery Julius La Rosa. After a minor backstage dispute with Godfrey, LaRosa violated an unwritten rule against Godfrey show regulars hiring personal management, despite the fact their contracts contained no such prohibition. Given Godfrey's popularity, the incident became a national scandal at the time, made worse when Godfrey explained the firing by declaring LaRosa had "lost his humility," precipitating a public backlash against Godfrey himself.

Godfrey was also known to relish confrontations with CBS network executives, including network Chairman William S. Paley, criticizing them on the air, aware the high profits from commercial time on his three television and radio programs gave him the upper hand.

Unlike Fuller, Godfrey did not die suddenly. He survived 1959 lung cancer surgery despite losing part of a lung and remained on CBS radio until 1972. He died in 1983 at age 79 of emphysema.

At the time of the film's release, Godfrey was still highly controversial. Part of the controversy involved his subsequent firings of various "Little Godfreys." Accusations in 1955 of anti-semitism that grew out of Godfrey's part-ownership of a Miami Beach hotel notorious for refusing to accommodate Jews also dogged him, though few believed the charges. Godfrey insisted he had ended that policy when he became one of the owners.

== See also ==
- List of American films of 1956
- A Face in the Crowd
