= Ed Wynn =

American actor and comedian (1886–1966)

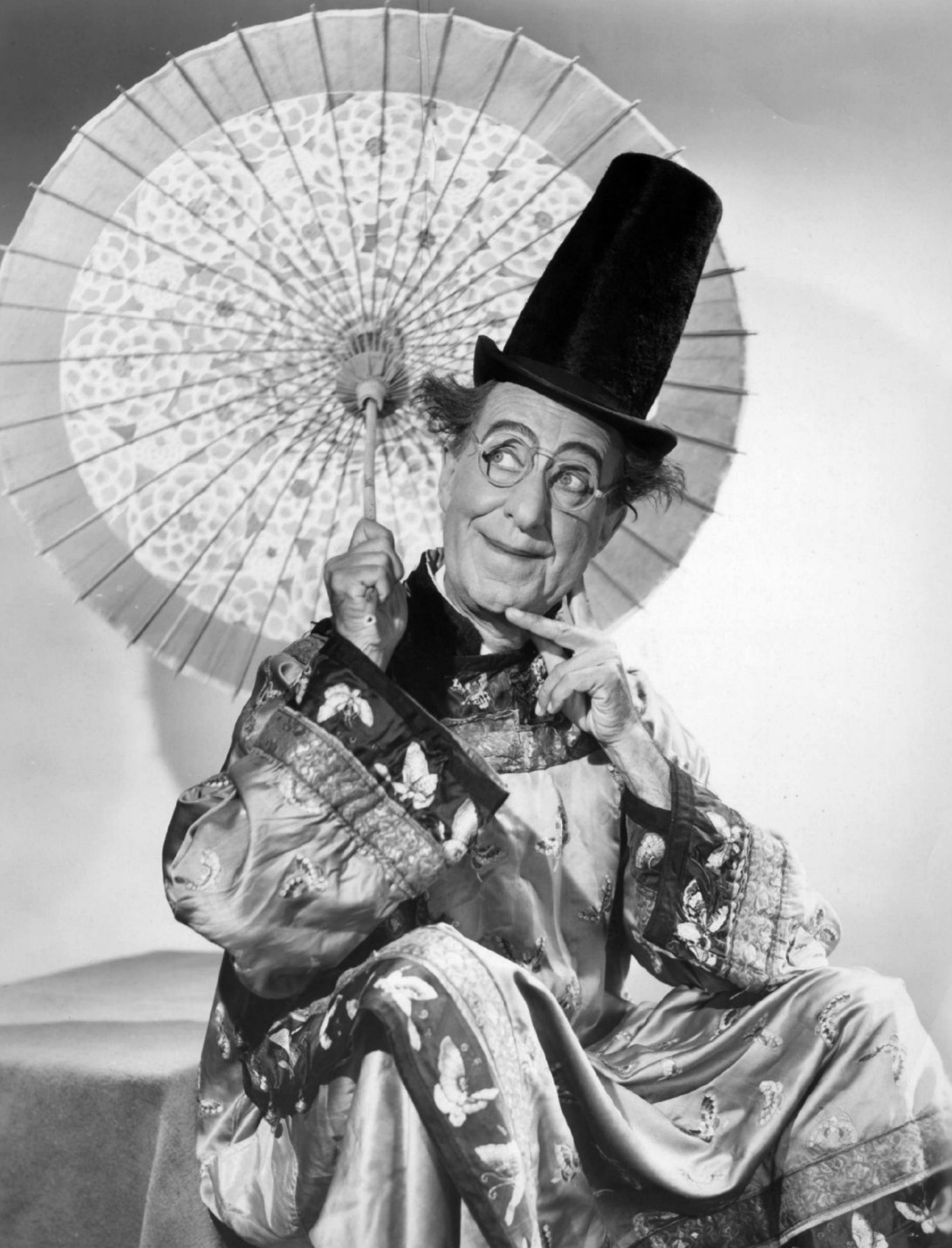
- Wynn in the television program All Star Revue (1951)
- Born: Isaiah Edwin Leopold; November 9, 1886; Philadelphia, Pennsylvania, U.S.
- Died: June 19, 1966 (aged 79); Beverly Hills, California, U.S.
- Resting place: Forest Lawn Memorial Park, Glendale, California, U.S.
- Occupations: Actor; comedian
- Years active: 1903–1966
- Spouses: Hilda Keenan (m. 1914; div. 1937); Frieda Mierse (m. 1937; div. 1939); Dorothy Elizabeth Nesbitt (m. 1946; div. 1955)
- Children: Keenan Wynn
- Relatives: Tracy Keenan Wynn (grandson); Ned Wynn (grandson); Jessica Keenan Wynn (great-granddaughter)

Isaiah Edwin Leopold (November 9, 1886 – June 19, 1966), better known as Ed Wynn, was an American actor and comedian. He began his career in vaudeville in 1903 and was known for his Perfect Fool comedy character, his pioneering radio show of the 1930s, his performances in classic Disney films such as Alice in Wonderland and Mary Poppins, and his later career as a dramatic actor, which continued into the 1960s. Wynn's variety show (1949–1950), The Ed Wynn Show, won a Peabody Award and an Emmy Award. Late in his career, he began alternating his comedic work with acclaimed dramatic performances; earning nominations for a Golden Globe and a BAFTA award for The Great Man, and the Academy Award for Best Supporting Actor for The Diary of Anne Frank.

== Background ==
Wynn was born Isaiah Edwin Leopold in Philadelphia, Pennsylvania, to a Jewish family on November 9, 1886. His father, Joseph, a milliner, was born in Bohemia. His mother, Minnie Greenberg, of Turkish and Romanian descent, came from Istanbul (then Constantinople). Wynn attended Central High School in Philadelphia until age 15. He ran away from home in his teens, worked as a hat salesman and as a utility boy, and eventually adapted his middle name "Edwin" into his new stage name, "Ed Wynn".

== Career ==
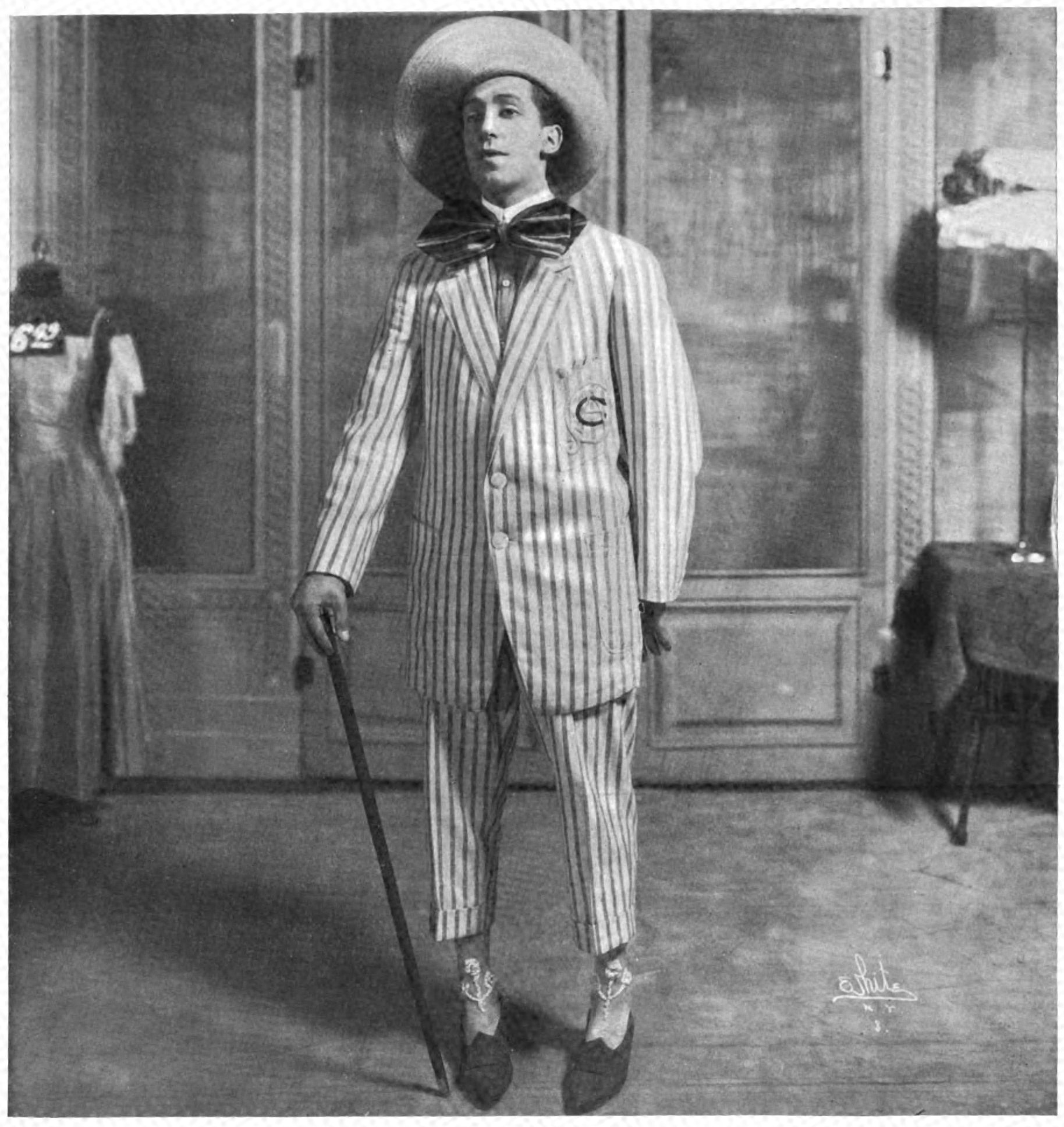
Ed Wynn in Mr. Busybody, 1908

Wynn began his career in vaudeville in 1903 and was a star of the Ziegfeld Follies starting in 1914. During Ziegfeld Follies of 1915, W. C. Fields allegedly caught Wynn mugging for the audience under the table during Fields's Pool Room routine and knocked Wynn unconscious with his cue. Wynn wrote, directed, and produced many Broadway shows in the subsequent decades, and was known for his silly costumes and props as well as for the giggly, wavering voice he developed for the 1921 musical revue The Perfect Fool. Wynn became a very active member of The Lambs Club in 1919.

=== Radio ===
In the early 1930s, Wynn hosted the radio show The Fire Chief, heard in North America on Tuesday nights, sponsored by Texaco gasoline. Like many former vaudeville performers who turned to radio in the same decade, the stage-trained Wynn insisted on playing for a live studio audience, doing each program as an actual stage show, using visual bits to augment his written material, and in his case, wearing a colorful costume with a red fireman's helmet. Wynn usually bounced his gags off announcer/straight man Graham McNamee; Wynn's customary opening, "Tonight, Graham, the show's gonna be different," became one of the most familiar tag-lines of its time; a sample joke: "Graham, my uncle just bought a new second-handed car... he calls it Baby! I don't know, it won't go anyplace without a rattle!"

Wynn reprised his Fire Chief radio character in two films, Follow the Leader (1930) and The Chief (1933). Near the height of his radio fame (1933) he founded his own short-lived radio network the Amalgamated Broadcasting System, which lasted only five weeks, nearly destroying the comedian. According to radio historian Elizabeth McLeod, the failed venture left Wynn deep in debt, divorced and finally, suffering a nervous breakdown.

Wynn was offered the title role The Wizard in MGM's 1939 screen adaptation of The Wizard of Oz, but turned it down, as did his Ziegfeld contemporary W. C. Fields. The part went to Frank Morgan.

=== Television ===
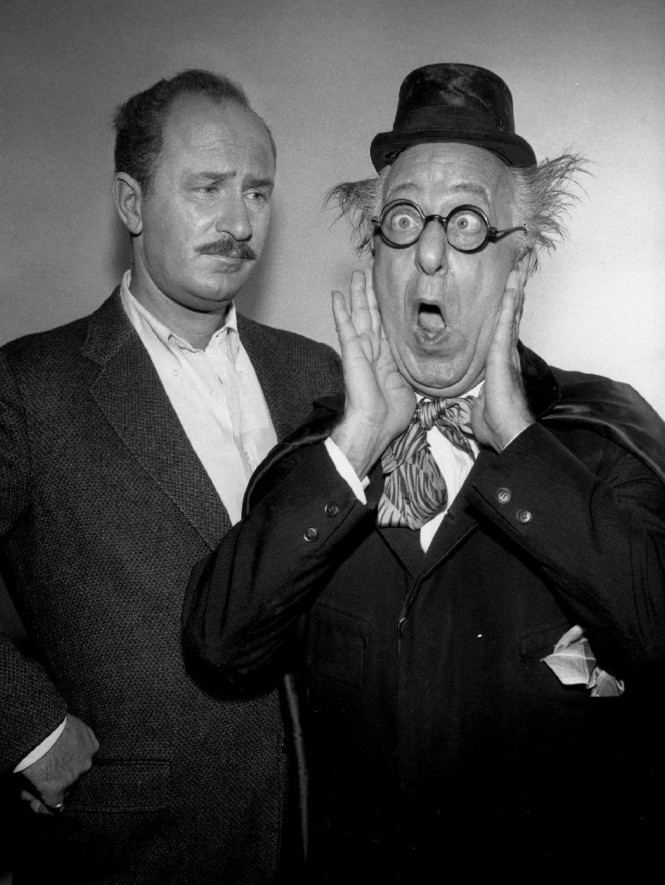
Wynn and his son Keenan in The Man in the Funny Suit (1960)

Wynn first appeared on television on July 7, 1936, in a brief, ad-libbed spot with Graham McNamee during an NBC experimental television broadcast. In the 1949–1950 season, Wynn hosted The Ed Wynn Show, one of the first network, comedy-variety television shows, on CBS, and won both a Peabody Award and an Emmy Award in 1949. Buster Keaton, Carmen Miranda, Lucille Ball, Desi Arnaz, Hattie McDaniel and The Three Stooges all made guest appearances with Wynn. This was the first CBS variety television show to originate from Los Angeles, which was seen live on the West Coast, but filmed via kinescope for distribution in the Midwestern United States and the Eastern United States, as the national coaxial cable had yet to be completed. Wynn was also a rotating host of NBC's Four Star Revue from 1950 through 1952.

After the end of Wynn's third television series, The Ed Wynn Show (a short-lived situation comedy on NBC's 1958–59 schedule), his son, actor Keenan Wynn, encouraged him to make a career change rather than retire. The comedian reluctantly began a career as a dramatic actor in television and films. The father and son appeared in three productions, the first of which was the 1956 Playhouse 90 broadcast of Rod Serling's play Requiem for a Heavyweight. Ed was terrified of straight acting, and kept goofing his lines in rehearsal. When the producers wanted to fire him, star Jack Palance said he would quit if they fired Ed. (However, unbeknownst to Wynn, supporting player Ned Glass was his secret understudy in case something did happen before air time.) On live broadcast night, Wynn surprised everyone with his pitch-perfect performance, and his quick ad libs to cover his mistakes. A dramatization of what happened during the production was later staged as an April 1960 Westinghouse Desilu Playhouse episode, The Man in the Funny Suit, starring both senior and junior Wynns, with key figures involved in the original production also portraying themselves (including Rod Serling and director Ralph Nelson). Ed and his son also worked together in the Jose Ferrer film The Great Man, with Ed again proving his unexpected skills in drama.

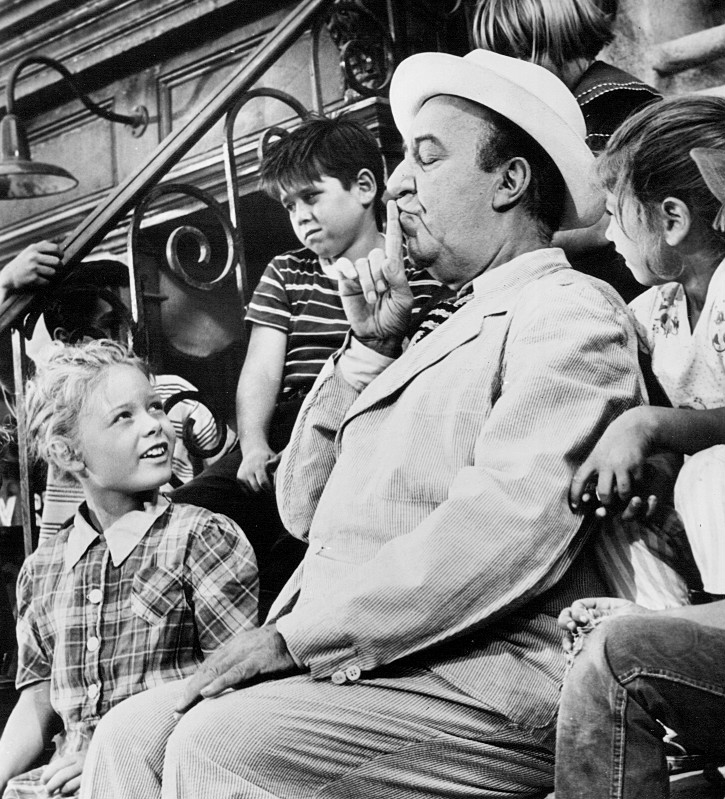
Wynn in The Twilight Zone episode "One for the Angels" (1959)

Requiem established Wynn as a serious dramatic actor who could easily hold his own with the best. His performance in The Diary of Anne Frank (1959) received an Academy Award nomination for Best Supporting Actor. That same year, Wynn appeared on Serling's TV series The Twilight Zone in "One for the Angels". Serling, a longtime admirer, had written that episode especially for him, and Wynn later in 1963 starred in the S5 E12 episode "Ninety Years Without Slumbering". For the rest of his life, Wynn skillfully moved between comic and dramatic roles. He appeared in feature films and anthology television, endearing himself to new generations of fans.

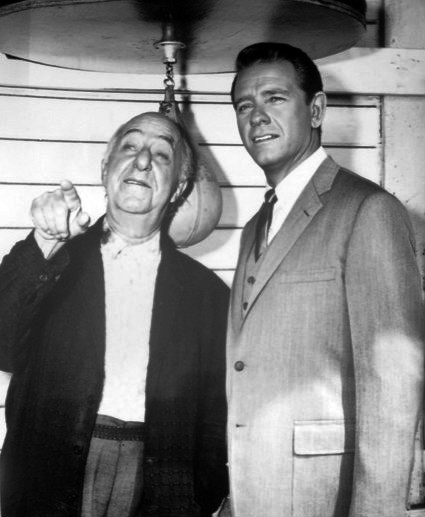
Wynn (left) and Richard Crenna (right) in Slattery's People, 1964.

=== Cartoons ===
Wynn was caricatured in the Merrie Melodies cartoon shorts Shuffle Off to Buffalo (1933), I've Got to Sing a Torch Song (1933), and as a pot of jam in the Betty Boop short Betty in Blunderland (1934).

=== Films ===
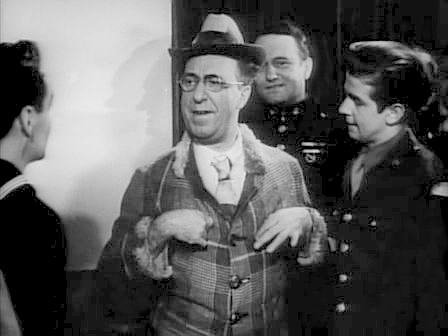
Wynn in the film Stage Door Canteen (1943)

Wynn appeared as the Fairy Godfather in Jerry Lewis's Cinderfella. His performance as Paul Beaseley in the 1958 film The Great Man earned him nominations for a Golden Globe Award for "Best Supporting Actor" and a BAFTA Award for "Best Foreign Actor". The following year he received his first (and only) nomination for an Academy Award for Best Supporting Actor for his role as Mr. Dussell in The Diary of Anne Frank (1959). Six years later he appeared as the blind man, Old Aram, in the Bible epic The Greatest Story Ever Told.

=== Disney ===
Wynn provided the voice and live action reference for the Mad Hatter in Walt Disney's film Alice in Wonderland (1951) and played The Toymaker alongside Annette Funicello and Tommy Sands in the Christmas operetta film Babes in Toyland released in 1961.

In Walt Disney's Mary Poppins (1964), Wynn played eccentric Uncle Albert floating around just beneath the ceiling in uncontrollable mirth, singing "I Love to Laugh".

Re-teaming with the Disney team the following year in That Darn Cat! (1965), featuring Dean Jones and Hayley Mills, Wynn filled out the character of Mr. Hofstedder, the watch jeweler with his bumbling charm. He also had brief roles in The Absent Minded Professor (as the fire chief, in a scene alongside his son Keenan Wynn, who played the film's antagonist) and Son of Flubber (as county agricultural agent A.J. Allen). Wynn's final performance, as Rufus in Walt Disney's The Gnome-Mobile, was released a year and one month after his death.

In addition to Disney films, Wynn was also an actor in the Disneyland production The Golden Horseshoe Revue.

== Personal life ==
Wynn was married three times. He first married actress Hilda Keenan on September 5, 1914. They divorced on May 13, 1937, after 23 years of marriage. Together, they had a son, actor Keenan Wynn. Wynn married his second wife, Frieda Mierse, on June 25, 1937, but they got divorced two years later on December 12, 1939. He married his third and final wife Dorothy Elizabeth Nesbitt on July 31, 1946. She filed for divorce on February 1, 1955, and it was finalized a month later on March 1.

Wynn was a Freemason at Lodge No. 9 in Pennsylvania.

== Death ==
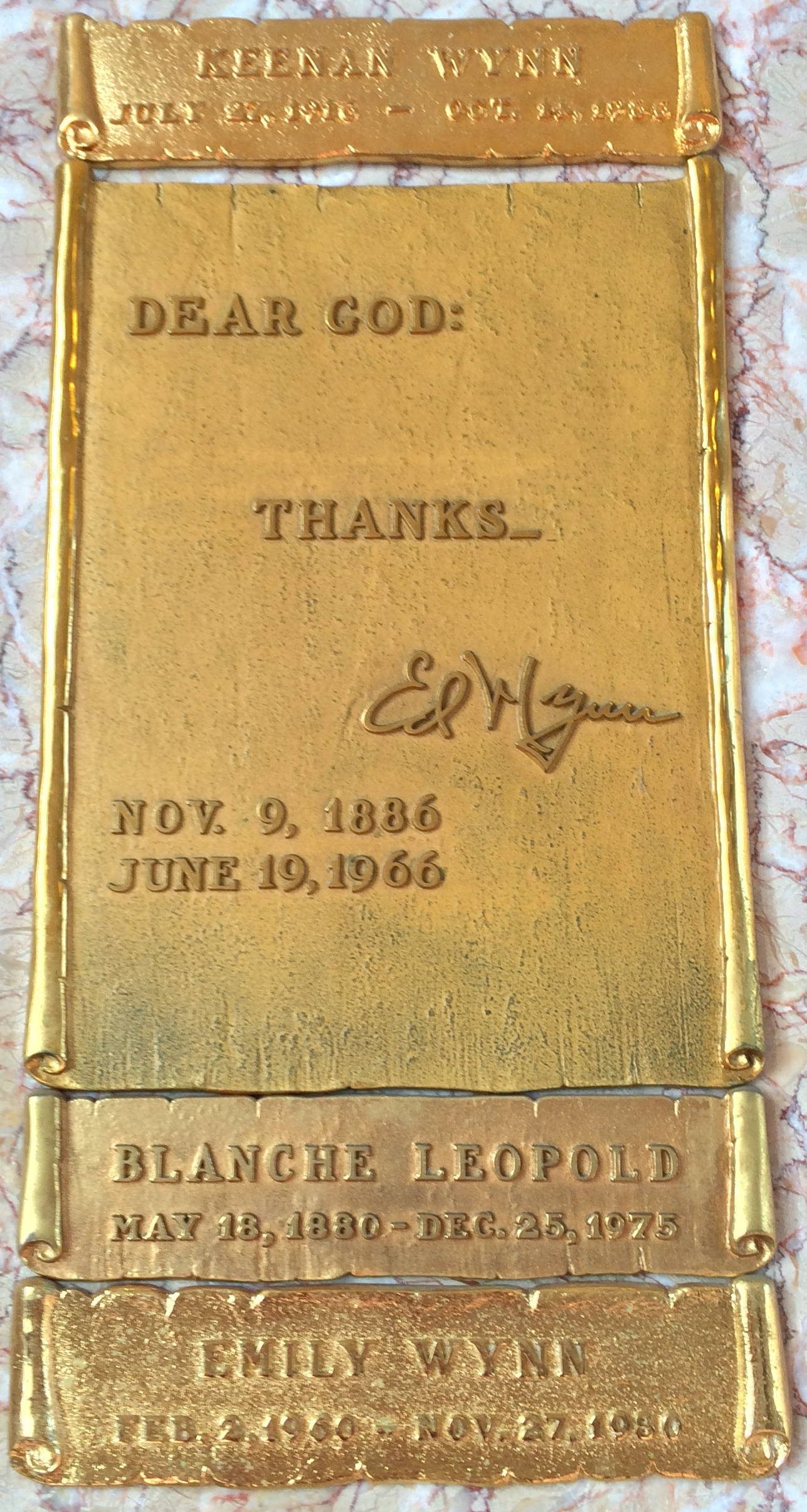
The niche of Ed Wynn, in the Great Mausoleum, Forest Lawn Glendale

Wynn died on June 19, 1966, in Beverly Hills, California, of esophageal cancer, at age 79. He is interred at Forest Lawn Memorial Park in Glendale. Wynn's bronze grave marker reads:

Dear God: Thanks... Ed Wynn

Red Skelton, who was discovered by Wynn, stated: "His death is the first time he ever made anyone sad."

== Legacy ==
Wynn's distinctive voice continues to be emulated by countless actors and comedians, including Alan Tudyk for the character King Candy in Disney's animated film Wreck-It Ralph.

Wynn was posthumously named a Disney Legend on August 10, 2013.

== Broadway and films ==
- The Deacon and the Lady (1910) – musical – actor/performer
- Ziegfeld Follies of 1914 (1914) – revue – actor/performer
- Ziegfeld Follies of 1915 (1915) – revue – actor/performer
- The Passing Show of 1916 (1916) – revue – actor/performer
- Sometime (1918) – play – actor
- Ed Wynn's Carnival (1920) – revue – composer, lyricist, book-writer and performer/actor
- The All-Star Idlers of 1921 (1921) – revue – actor/performer
- The Perfect Fool (1921) – revue – composer, lyricist, book-writer, director and actor/performer
- The Grab Bag (1924) – revue – producer, composer, lyricist, book-writer and actor/performer
- Manhattan Mary (1927) – musical – actor in the role of "Crickets"
- Rubber Heels (1927) – actor (as Homer Thrush)
- Simple Simon (1930) – musical – co-book-writer and actor
  - Revived in 1931 (was also producer in addition to above roles)
- Follow the Leader (1930) – actor (as Crickets)
- The Laugh Parade (1931) – revue – producer, co-book-writer, director, originator and star actor/performer
- Turn Back the Clock (1933) – actor (as Cigar Store Customer), uncredited
- The Chief (1933) – actor (as Henry Summers)
- Alice Takat (1936) – play – producer
- Hooray for What! (1937) – musical – actor in the role of "Chuckles"
- Boys and Girls Together (1940) – revue – producer, co-book-writer, originator, director and actor/performer
- Morose Thoughts (1941) – revue – producer, book co-author, and actor
- Laugh, Town, Laugh! (1942) – revue – producer, book-writer and director
- Stage Door Canteen (1943) – himself (Ed Wynn)
- Alice in Wonderland (1951) – voice actor (as Mad Hatter)
- Playhouse 90 episode "Requiem for a Heavyweight" (1956) – actor (as Army)
- The Great Man (1956) – actor (as Paul Beaseley)
- Marjorie Morningstar (1958) – actor (as Uncle Samson)
- The Diary of Anne Frank (1959) – actor (as Fritz Pfeffer)
- Wagon Train episode "The Cappy Darrin Story" (1959) – actor (as Cappy Darrin)
- Peabody's Improbable History episode "King Arthur" (1959) – voice actor (as Frantic Man)
- The Twilight Zone episode "One for the Angels" (1959) – actor (as Lou Bookman)
- Miracle on 34th Street (1959) – actor (as Kris Kringle)
- Startime episode "The Greatest Man Alive" (1960) – actor (as Amos Benedict)
- Cinderfella (1960) – actor (as the fairy godfather)
- The Absent-Minded Professor (1961) – actor (as Fire Chief)
- Babes in Toyland (1961) – actor (as The Toy Maker)
- Rawhide episode "Twenty-Five Santa Clauses" (1961) – actor (as Bateman)
- The Sound of Laughter (1962) – actor (as host and narrator)
- Son of Flubber (1963) – actor (as Dept. of Agriculture agent)
- 77 Sunset Strip episode "5: Part 1" (1963) – actor (as Feigenstein)
- The Twilight Zone episode "Ninety Years Without Slumbering" (1963) – actor (as Sam Forstmann)
- Burke's Law episode "Who Killed Avery Lord?" (1964) – actor (as Zachary Belden)
- For the Love of Willadean (1964) – actor (as Alfred)
- The Patsy (1964) – actor (as Ed Wynn)
- Mary Poppins (1964) – actor (as Uncle Albert)
- Slattery's People episode "Question: What Ever Happened to Ezra?" (1964) – actor (as Ezra Tallicott)
- Dear Brigitte (1965) – actor (as The Captain and Narrator)
- Those Calloways (1965) – actor (as Ed Parker)
- Bonanza episode "The Ponderosa Birdman" (1965) – actor (as Professor Phineas T. Klump)
- The Greatest Story Ever Told (1965) – actor (as Old Aram)
- That Darn Cat! (1965) – actor (as Mr. Hofstedder)
- The Daydreamer (1966) – voice actor (as The Emperor)
- The Red Skelton Hour – guest star (1966)
- Combat! episode "The Flying Machine" (1966) – actor (as Lt. Brannigan)
- Vacation Playhouse episode "You're Only Young Twice" (1967) – actor (as Professor Hubert Abernathy)
- The Gnome-Mobile (1967) – actor (as Rufus) – released after his death (final film role)

== Awards and nominations ==
Year	Award	Nominated work	Result
1950	Emmy Award for Best Live Show	The Ed Wynn Show	Won
1957	Golden Globe Award for Best Supporting Actor - Motion Picture	The Great Man	Nominated
1958	BAFTA Award for Best Foreign Actor	The Great Man	Nominated
1959	Academy Award for Best Supporting Actor	The Diary of Anne Frank	Nominated

== See also ==
- List of actors with Academy Award nominations
