= Ken Murray (entertainer) =

American comedian, actor, and author (1903–1988)

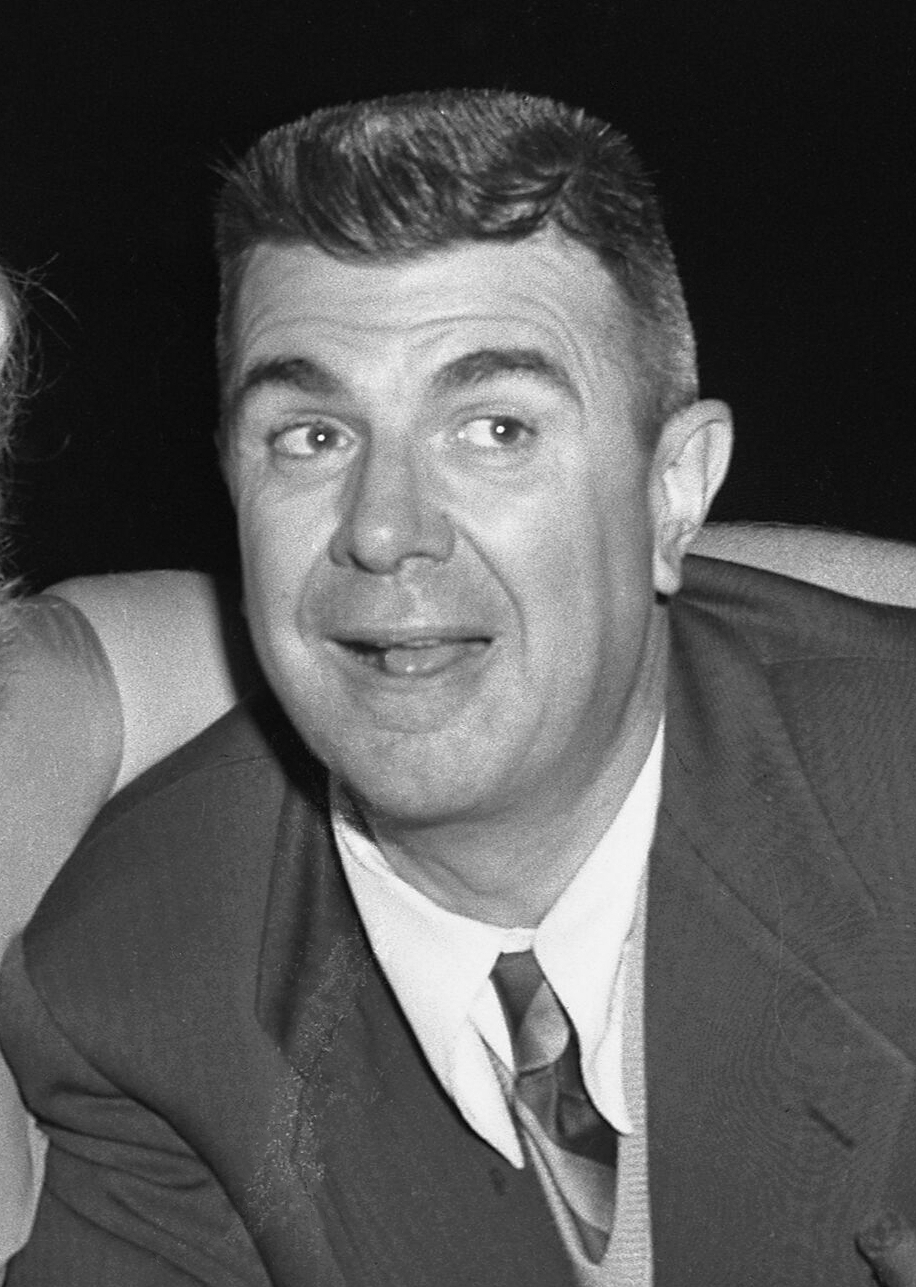
- Murray in 1952
- Born: Kenneth Abner Doncourt; July 14, 1903; New York City, New York, U.S.
- Died: October 12, 1988 (aged 85); Burbank, California, U.S.
- Occupations: Comedian; actor; radio personality; television personality; author
- Years active: 1929–1983
- Spouse(s): Charlotte LaRose (m. 1923; div. 1926) Cleatus Caldwell (m. 1941; div. 1946) Betty Lou Walters (m. 1948)
- Children: 4

Ken Murray (born Kenneth Abner Doncourt, July 14, 1903 – October 12, 1988) was an American comedian, actor, radio and television personality and author.

== Early life ==
Murray was born in New York City to a family of vaudeville performers. Many sources incorrectly give his birth name as Don Court. He was raised believing he had an older brother, Joseph. According to Murray's autobiography, Life on a Pogo Stick, as a teenager he learned that Joseph was actually his father and the couple who he thought were his parents were in fact his grandparents. The family withheld the truth from Murray because Joseph, who was also a vaudevillian, did not want the public to know that he had a young son. Joseph had divorced Murray's mother and decided that his parents would provide a more stable life than he was able to as a traveling performer. Murray also wrote of his quest to find his mother in his later years.

== Career ==
=== Vaudeville and stage ===
Murray got his start in show business on the stage in the 1920s as a stand-up comedian. He performed his comedy act on the vaudeville circuit and in burlesque. Following efforts to establish himself in Hollywood in the late 1920s, he found success on the New York stage after appearing in Earl Carroll's Vanities on Broadway in 1935.

In the 1940s, Murray became famous for his Blackouts, a racy Hollywood variety show featuring Marie Wilson (among others) staged at the El Capitan Theatre on Vine Street. The Blackouts played to standing-room-only audiences for 3,844 performances, ending in 1949. Later that year, the show moved to Broadway with Marie Windsor replacing Marie Wilson. It received devastating reviews (the revue was considered too ribald for more sophisticated New York audiences) and closed after six weeks.

Murray revived the Blackouts on the Las Vegas stage in 1956. The show was a hit and ran for three years.

=== Radio, films and television ===
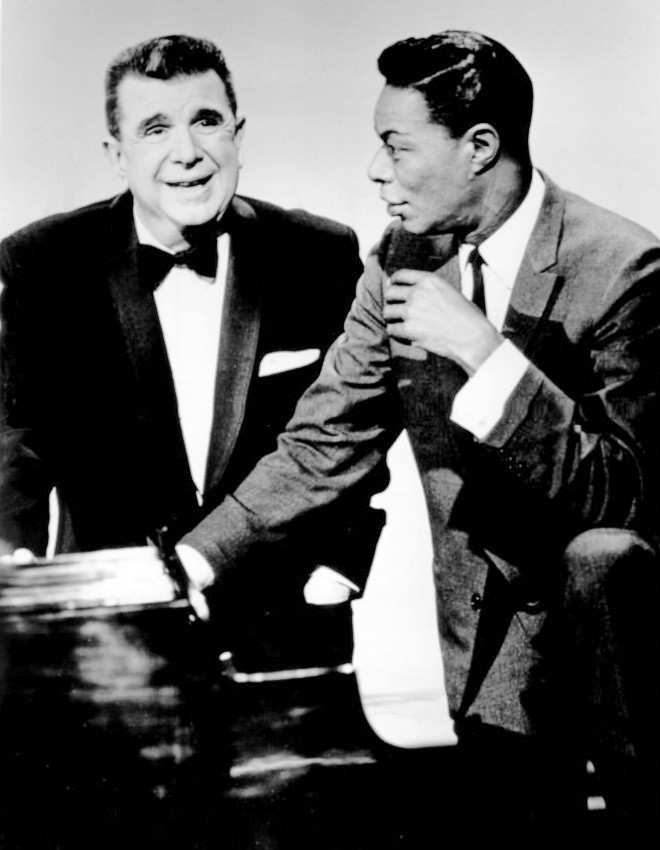
Publicity photo with Nat King Cole from the television program The Hollywood Palace (1964)

After finding success on the vaudeville stage, Murray moved to Hollywood and made his film debut in the 1929 romantic drama Half Marriage, followed by a role in Leathernecking in 1930.

Murray was the host of a weekly radio variety program, The Ken Murray Show, on NBC (1932–33) and on CBS (1936–37). Murray's act during this period was a "fast patter" routine opposite his stooge Oswald, who would confound Murray with silly questions or snappy comebacks. Oswald was played by accordionist Tony Labriola. Murray and Labriola were so popular that they made a series of phonograph records for Victor, as well as a series of short movie comedies for Vitaphone in New York.

He later was the original host (1945–57) of Queen for a Day, on the Mutual Broadcasting System radio show, which was simulcast on KTSL (now KCBS-TV), Channel 2 in Los Angeles.

During World War II, Murray was one of the many celebrities to volunteer at the Hollywood Canteen.

In 1947, he produced Bill and Coo, a feature film using trained birds and other animals as actors. Bill and Coo won a special Academy Award for "novel and entertaining use of the medium of motion picture" and "artistry and patience" .

He was also the host of The Ken Murray Show, a weekly music and comedy show on CBS Television that ran from 1950 to 1953. The show was the first to win a Freedom Foundation Award. Murray also guest-starred on several television series, including The Ford Show, Starring Tennessee Ernie Ford and The Bing Crosby Show.

== Show-business fan ==
Throughout his career Ken Murray always admired bygone celebrities from the world of show business. In 1936 he noted the surprise comeback of the Original Dixieland Jazz Band and hired them to join his traveling troupe of entertainers for personal appearances. Murray's gesture was well intentioned, but aVariety reviewer caught a Baltimore engagement and disapproved of Murray's handling: "Unfortunately boys aren't getting the spotlight they deserve. They're part of Murray's act and, with two brief exceptions, there's something in front of band [at] all times. To many, that old act has been mythical, especially in last year-and-half. Murray didn't even adequately explain band's background when intro'ing it. Comic should certainly take advantage of what he has in his own act."

Murray also persuaded silent-film actress Mae Murray, long retired, to be interviewed as a guest on his radio show. In 1950 he returned the former Our Gang star Darla Hood to prominence, hiring her as a singer for his Blackouts stage revue and his television show.

Murray was considered a Hollywood gadabout, friendly with most Hollywood celebrities. He often visited social affairs with his 16mm home-movie camera in hand. He began filming the footage to send back home to his grandparents in lieu of writing letters. His grandmother saved the footage, which featured Hollywood stars including Douglas Fairbanks, Mary Pickford, Charlie Chaplin and Jean Harlow. Murray later assembled the footage in compilation films such as Hollywood Without Make-Up (1963). Footage filmed by Murray was used in several television specials, including Hollywood: My Home Town (1965) and the feature-length film Ken Murray's Shooting Stars.

Murray's prominence on the social scene resulted in producer-director Ralph Staub hiring Murray to emcee some of the Screen Snapshots theatrical films for Columbia Pictures. These popular reels showed various personalities informally or semi-formally at parties, social functions, and fundraisers.

== Character actor ==
Murray made occasional appearances in motion pictures and television as a character actor. Murray produced and co-starred as "Smiling Billy Murray" in a 1953 film, The Marshal's Daughter, a western that featured his protégée Laurie Anders in the title role, her sole film performance. In 1962, Murray portrayed the top-hatted, cigar-chewing, drunken Doc Willoughby in John Ford's The Man Who Shot Liberty Valance starring John Wayne and James Stewart, arguably his most memorable screen role. Paired off for most of the picture with Edmond O'Brien as an alcoholic newspaper editor, he drunkenly rolls over the gunshot corpse of villain Liberty Valance (Lee Marvin) with his boot, looks around offhandedly, and says "Dead" to the surrounding crowd of euphoric Mexicans. In 1965, Murray played a THRUSH financier and owner of a Caribbean casino in The Man from U.N.C.L.E. In 1966, Murray was cast as Melody Murphy in the Walt Disney film Follow Me, Boys! starring Fred MacMurray, Vera Miles and Kurt Russell.

== Writer ==
Murray was the author of a number of books, including his autobiography published in 1960, titled Life on a Pogo Stick: Autobiography of a Comedian.

He also wrote The Golden Days of San Simeon (1971), a history of William Randolph Hearst's opulent estate on the central California coast known as "Hearst Castle," which featured many of Murray's photographs of stars who visited there. Footage he shot on those occasions was included in a short film, featuring Murray, shown in the Castle's theater on one of the estate tours for many years.

Murray wrote the only complete life story in print of Broadway theatre impresario Earl Carroll, titled The Body Merchant (1976).

== Personal life ==
Murray was married three times and had four children. He married vaudeville and burlesque performer Carlotta (Charlotte) La Rose in 1923. The couple appeared in vaudeville together and later divorced. On July 4, 1941, Murray married model Cleatus Caldwell at the home of actor Lew Ayres in Hollywood. Edgar Bergen served as Murray's best man. The couple had two sons before divorcing in September 1945.

Murray married his third wife, Betty Lou Walters, in December 1948. The couple had two daughters and remained married until Murray's death on October 12, 1988, at Saint Joseph Medical Center in Burbank, California, aged 85. Murray has a star on the Hollywood Walk of Fame at 1724 Vine Street for his contribution to the radio industry. He was a Republican.

== Selected filmography ==
- Half Marriage (1929) - Charles Turner
- Leathernecking (1930) - Frank
- Ladies of the Jury (1932) - Spencer B. Dazy
- Crooner (1932) - Peter Sturgis
- Disgraced! (1933) - Jim McGuire
- From Headquarters (1933) - Mac
- You're a Sweetheart (1937) - Don King
- Swing, Sister, Swing (1938) - Nap Sisler
- A Night at Earl Carroll's (1940) - Barney Nelson
- Swing It Soldier (1941) - Jerry Traynor
- Juke Box Jenny (1942) - Malcolm Hammond
- Bill and Coo (1948) - Ken Murray (Prologue)
- Red Light (1949) - Himself
- The Marshal's Daughter (1953) - 'Smiling Billy' Murray
- The Man Who Shot Liberty Valance (1962) - Doc Willoughby
- Son of Flubber (1963) - Mr. Hurley
- Hollywood Without Make-Up (1963)
- Hollywood, My Home Town (1965) - Himself
- Follow Me, Boys! (1966) - Melody Murphy
- The Power (1968) - Grover
- Won Ton Ton, the Dog Who Saved Hollywood (1976) - Souvenir Salesman (final film role)
- Ken Murray's Shooting Stars (1979, director)

== Bibliography ==
- Foolin' Around (1932)
- Ken Murray's Blackouts of 1943 (1943)
- Ken Murray's Blackouts of 1947 (1947)
- Hellion's Hole/Feud in Piney Flats (1953)
- Hellions' Hole (1953)
- Ken Murray's Giant Joke Book (1954)
- Life on a Pogo Stick: Autobiography of a Comedian (1960)
- The Golden Days of San Simeon (1971)
- The Body Merchant: The Story of Earl Carroll (1976)
