= The Fire Chief (radio program) =

American radio variety program (1932–1935)

The Fire Chief is an American variety radio program that starred Ed Wynn and was broadcast on NBC from April 26, 1932, to June 4, 1935. It was also known as The Texaco Fire Chief. The show had an audience of 29 million people, and through it Wynn "became a household figure".

== Overview ==
Episodes typically began with the sounds fo bells clanging, horns tooting, and Wynn laughing hysterically, after which he spoke his opening line in a falsetto voice that was cracking. Graham McNamee was Wynn's straight man for exchanging jokes as the format alternated segments of music and jokes for the show's 30 minutes. Don Voorhees was the first music director, leading the 35-piece Fire Chief Band and the Fire Chief Double Quartet male vocal group. Eddy Duchin replaced Voorhees beginning on October 2, 1934. Wynn said of The Fire Chief: "This is a program that's different. No theme song, no crooner, no soprano, and no contests."

The Fire Chief concept was originated by Thomas S. Buchanan, an advertising executive who handled the Texaco account for the Hanff-Metzger agency. He created Fire Chief as the name for Texaco's gasoline, and it was later applied to the program and to Wynn. The actor became identified with the character; Wynn said that in the summer of 1934 "about twenty-four cities invited me as their guest and made me their fire chief." He added, "I was no longer an actor; they received me as a character, as one of them. They told me I was a part of their families, because I was always in their homes. even though only by radio. 'The mere fact.' they said, 'that you're in our homes makes you belong to us.'" Wynn told friends that he was unable to understand his popularity that resulted from the radio program, and it bewildered him. The program's impact brought an abrupt change in Wynn's public image. He said, "I spent 29 years plugging the name 'The Perfect Fool'. Now, in a few short weeks, it's of no use. I am now 'The Fire Chief' and not even my best friends will call me anything else."

== Production and promotion ==
Using an approach that differed from most radio programs, Wynn performed in costumes that included bell-bottom coats, fireman outfits (including helmet), funny hats, and raccoon coats. He usually changed costumes six to eight times per episode and wore as many as 30 hats during a show. He said that wearing the outfits made him feel funny, and he hoped that feeling would make him sound funny. The show had an in-studio audience, which was also unusual for its time.

Texaco sponsored The Fire Chief, which was broadcast on Tuesdays at 9:30 p.m. Eastern Time. Wynn's character created an interest in fire-chief helmets, which led to a promotion in which listeners could visit a Texaco dealer to obtain a red fire chief's hat. The New York Times reported, "The immediate demand was overwhelming." By July 1932, dealers had ordered 2.75 million helmets at a cost of $6.75 per 100. Hawkers also sold models of the hats on streets.

The Fire Chief initially originated from NBC's Crystal Studio (formerly the Frolic Theatre) atop the New Amsterdam Theatre in New York City. NBC received so many requests for tickets that some recipients had to wait five or six weeks to attend a broadcast. Part of the program's first year occurred concurrently with Wynn's tour in the musical comedy The Laugh Parade. During the tour, each week's broadcast originated from the theater in which the stage show was playing. Proceeds from nominal admissions charges for the broadcast were donated to charities in each community. During the program's second year, Wynn toured with a condensed version of Laugh Parade, but he did not do the stage show on Tuesdays. Instead, he returned to New York City for each broadcast.

Wynn and McNamee rehearsed their lines alone on stage with Wynn in costume. The orchestra was dismissed after its rehearsal so that the musicians would not hear the dialogue until the show was broadcast, ensuring a spontaneous reaction to what was said. Some people listened via a backstage radio and provided feedback to the two men.

== In popular culture ==
In late 1933, Metro-Goldwyn-Mayer released the film The Chief, starring Wynn in his familiar role. A review in The New York Times said, "Mr. Wynn transfers his celebrated radio character to the screen and it comes out, visually, a good deal less hilarious than on the air waves". The end of the film showed Wynn "in a typical radio broadcast, dictating answers to his fan mail".
