= Ned Wynn =

American actor and screenwriter (1941–2020)

- Born: Edmond Keenan Wynn; April 27, 1941; New York City, U.S.
- Died: December 20, 2020 (aged 79); Healdsburg, California, U.S.
- Occupations: Actor; screenwriter
- Years active: 1960–1982
- Parent(s): Keenan Wynn (1916-1986); Evelyn (Evie) Abbot (1914-2004)
- Relatives: Tracy Keenan Wynn (brother); Ed Wynn (grandfather); Hilda Keenan (grandmother); Frank Keenan (great-grandfather); Jessica Keenan Wynn (niece); Van Johnson (stepfather)

Edmond "Ned" Keenan Wynn (April 27, 1941 – December 20, 2020) was a third-generation American actor and screenwriter.

== Personal life ==
Ned was the son of actor Keenan Wynn and the grandson of actor and comedian Ed Wynn. His mother, Evie, had played a number of supporting roles on Broadway in the 1930s, where she met Keenan in a production of The Star-Wagon. After they married in 1939, "Evie gave up acting to work as his unofficial agent and business manager." In 1947, after divorcing Keenan, Evie married his best friend, actor and leading man Van Johnson, allegedly at the behest of studio officials who coerced the pair into marrying in order to forestall adverse publicity about Johnson's homosexual orientation.

Ned discussed his parents and family life in the autobiography We Will Always Live in Beverly Hills: Growing Up Crazy in Hollywood, published in 1990.

== Career ==
Wynn played bit parts in several beach party films in the 1960s. He had a small part with his father, Keenan Wynn, and his grandfather, Ed Wynn, in the Disney comedy The Absent-Minded Professor (1961) and with his father in the sequel, Son of Flubber (1963). Ned and his father also appeared in The Patsy (1964) and in the remake of Stagecoach (1966).

According to the Television Academy, "After attending school in Switzerland, the University of Pennsylvania, and University of California, Berkeley, Wynn worked at Fox as a script analyst. As a screenwriter, he penned the film California Dreaming (1979), an episode of the television series Matt Houston, and a number of teleplays."

== Death ==
Wynn died of Parkinson's disease in Healdsburg, California, on December 20, 2020, at the age of 79.

== Filmography ==
=== Actor ===
- The Bellboy (1960) - Bellhop (uncredited)
- The Absent-Minded Professor (1961) - Boy (uncredited)
- Son of Flubber (1963) - Rutland Student Manager (uncredited)
- The Patsy (1964) - Band Member
- Bikini Beach (1964) - Surfer #9
- Pajama Party (1964) - Pajama Boy
- Beach Blanket Bingo (1965) - Beach Boy
- How to Stuff a Wild Bikini (1965) - Beach Boy
- Stagecoach (1966) - Ike Plummer
- California Dreaming (1979) - Earl Fescue
- Don't Go to Sleep (1982, TV Movie) - Paramedic (final film role)

=== Screenwriter ===
- California Dreaming (1979)
- Don't Go to Sleep (1982)
- Velvet (1984)
- Holy Joe (1999)
