= Keenan Wynn =

American actor (1916–1986)

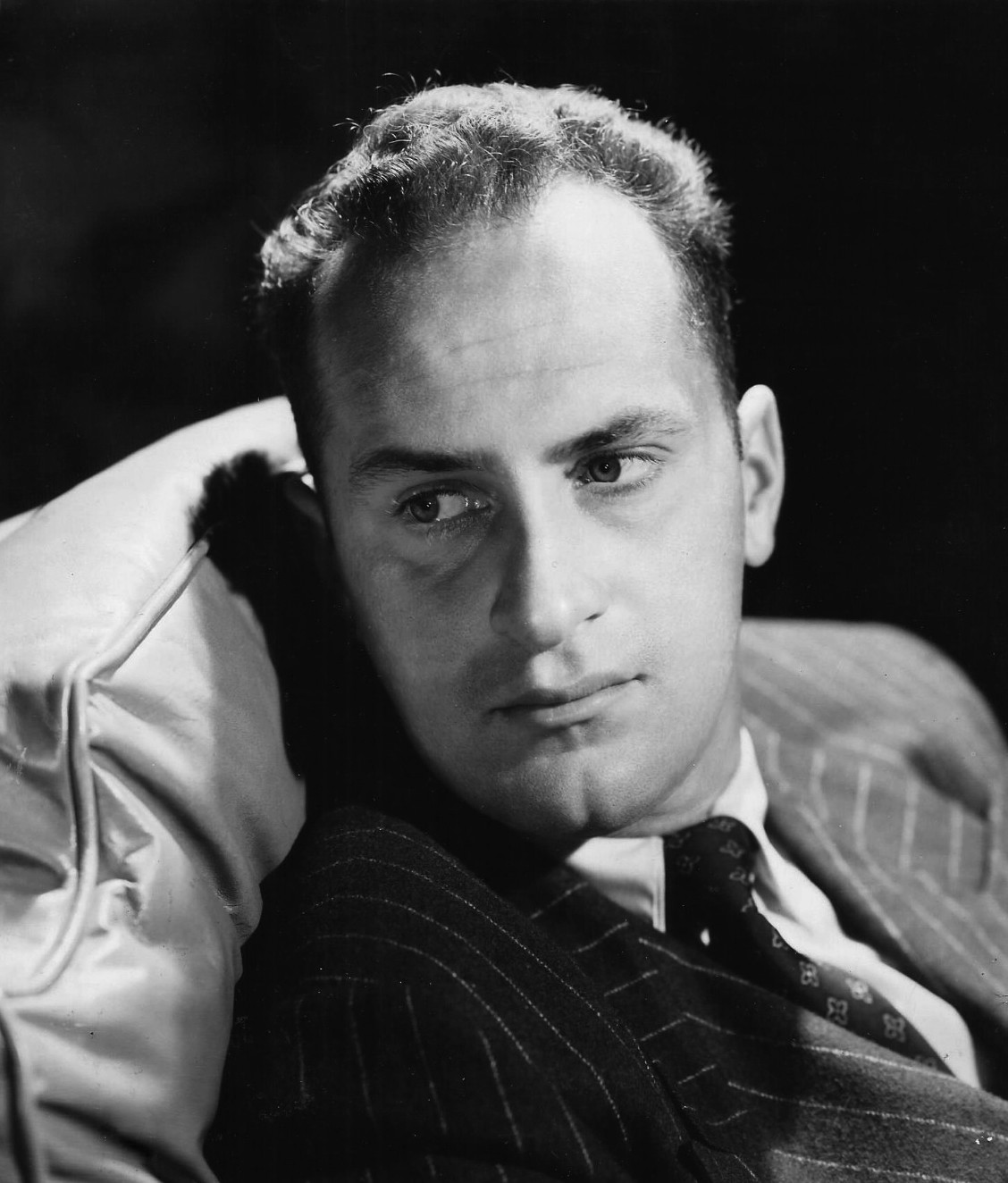
- Wynn in 1950
- Born: Francis Xavier Aloysius James Jeremiah Keenan Wynn; July 27, 1916; New York City, U.S.
- Died: October 14, 1986 (aged 70); Brentwood, California, U.S.
- Resting place: Forest Lawn Memorial Park, Glendale, California, U.S.
- Occupation: Actor
- Years active: 1934–1986
- Spouses: Eve Lynn Abbott (m. 1938; div. 1947) Betty Jane Butler (m. 1949; div. 1953) Sharley Hudson (m. 1954)
- Children: 5, including Tracy Keenan Wynn and Ned Wynn
- Parents: Ed Wynn (father); Hilda Keenan (mother)
- Relatives: Frank Keenan (grandfather); Jessica Keenan Wynn (granddaughter)

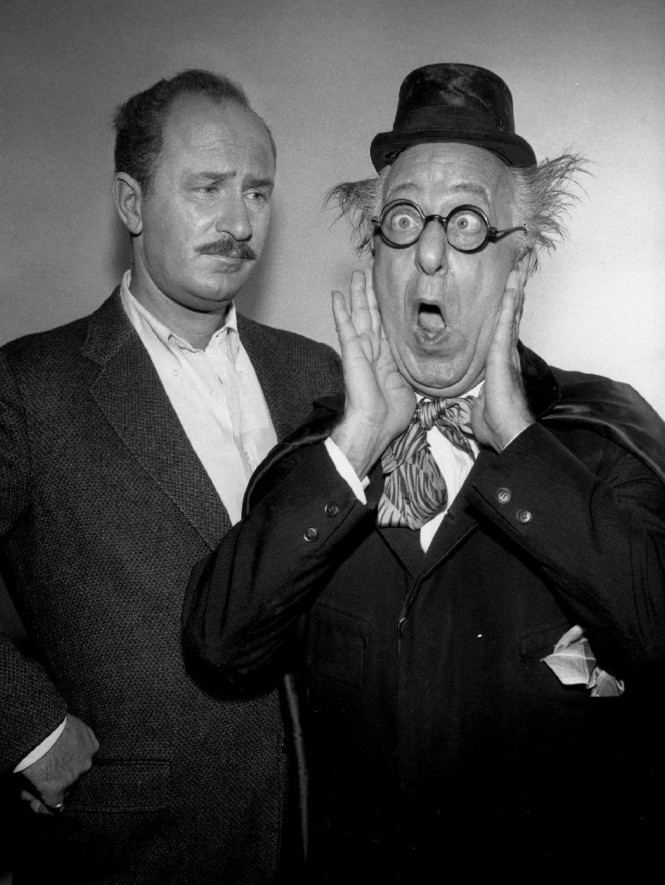
Keenan and Ed Wynn in The Man in the Funny Suit (1960)

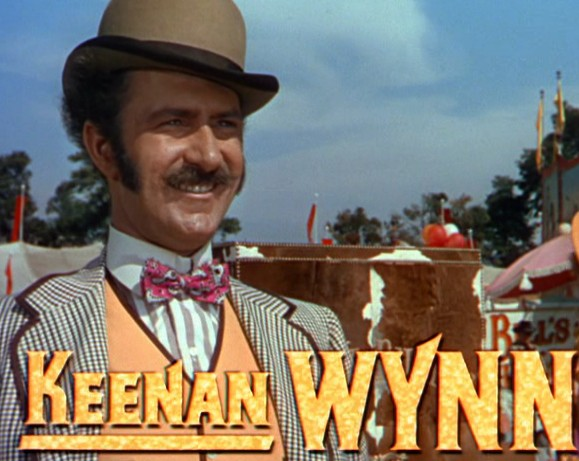
Annie Get Your Gun (1950)

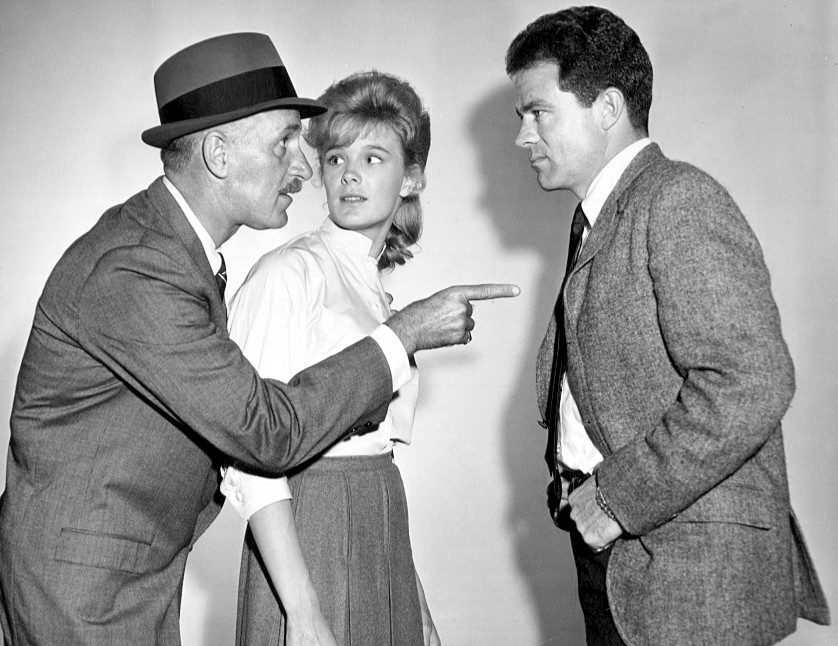
Keenan Wynn, Linda Evans, and Jack Ging in an episode of TV's The Eleventh Hour (1963)

Francis Xavier Aloysius James Jeremiah Keenan Wynn (July 27, 1916 – October 14, 1986) was an American character actor. Well-known for his highly expressive face, he was rarely cast as a leading actor, although he did receive prominent cast member billing for most of his film and television roles.

== Early life ==
Wynn was born on July 27, 1916, in New York City, the only child of vaudeville comedian Ed Wynn and his wife, the former Hilda Keenan. He took his stage name from his maternal grandfather, Frank Keenan, one of the first Broadway actors to star in Hollywood. His father was Jewish and his mother was of Irish Catholic background. Ed Wynn encouraged his son to become an actor, and to join The Lambs Club, which he did in 1937.

== Career ==
=== Theatre and radio ===
Wynn began his career as a stage actor. He appeared in several plays on Broadway, including Remember the Day (1935), Black Widow (1936), Hitch Your Wagon (1937), The Star Wagon (1938), One for the Money (1939), Two for the Show (1940), and The More the Merrier (1941).

Wynn starred in the radio show The Amazing Mr. Smith on Mutual Broadcasting System from April 7 to June 30, 1941. He played the title role, "a carefree young man who runs into trouble galore and becomes an involuntary detective".

=== Film and television ===
Wynn appeared in hundreds of films and television series between 1934 and 1986. He was a Metro-Goldwyn-Mayer contract player during the 1940s and 1950s. He had a brief role as a belligerent, unsympathetic drunk in the wartime romance The Clock (1945). Arguably his most dynamic performance was a small role in The Hucksters (1947) with Clark Gable. His early postwar credits include The Three Musketeers (1948), playing D'Artagnan's servant; Annie Get Your Gun (1950); Royal Wedding (1951); Kiss Me, Kate (1953); The Man in the Gray Flannel Suit (1956); The Absent-Minded Professor (1961); The Americanization of Emily (1964) and Dr. Strangelove (1964).

The Wynns, father and son, both appeared in the original 1956 Playhouse 90 television production of Rod Serling's Requiem for a Heavyweight. The son was returning the favor: according to radio historian Elizabeth McLeod, Keenan had helped his father overcome professional collapse, a harrowing divorce, and a nervous breakdown to return to work a decade earlier, and now helped convince Serling and producer Martin Manulis that the elder Wynn should play the wistful trainer. Both he and his father also appeared in a subsequent television drama called The Man in the Funny Suit (1960), which detailed the problems they had experienced while working on that series. In it, the Wynns, Serling, and many of the cast and crew played themselves. Keenan also featured in another Rod Serling production, a Twilight Zone episode entitled "A World of His Own" (1960), as playwright Gregory West, who uniquely caused series creator Serling to disappear from the screen.

On January 18, 1959, Wynn starred in S. J. Perelman's Hollywood satire, "Malice in Wonderland", broadcast on NBC's prestigious Sunday afternoon anthology series Omnibus.

Wynn took a dramatic turn as Yost in the crime drama Point Blank (1967) with Lee Marvin. He had a leading role in the third Beach Party movie, Bikini Beach (1964), as a scheming newspaper publisher who wants to banish the local young people. Later he played Hezakiah in the comedy film The Great Race (1965). He was the voice of the Winter Warlock in Santa Claus Is Comin' to Town (1970) and appeared in several Disney films, including Snowball Express (1972), Herbie Rides Again (1974) and The Shaggy D.A. (1976) (as a villain). He appeared as villainous businessman Alonzo Hawk in three Disney films: The Absent-Minded Professor, Son of Flubber, and Herbie Rides Again.

He appeared in Francis Ford Coppola's musical Finian's Rainbow (1968), Sergio Leone's epic western Once Upon a Time in the West (also 1968), and Robert Altman's Nashville (1975). During this time, his guest television roles included Alias Smith and Jones (1971–1972), Emergency! (1975), Movin' On (1975) and The Bionic Woman (1978). Wynn appeared in ten episodes of Dallas during the 1979–1980 season, playing former Ewing family partner-turned-enemy Digger Barnes. David Wayne, a friend of Wynn's, had played Digger Barnes in 1978 but was unable to continue because of his co-starring role on the CBS series House Calls, starring Wayne Rogers.

Wynn was initially cast in Superman (1978) as Perry White (the boss of Clark Kent and Lois Lane at the Daily Planet) in April 1977. In June, Wynn collapsed from exhaustion and was rushed to a hospital. He was replaced by Jackie Cooper.

He played Charles Picker Dobbs on a 1982 episode of The Love Boat. In 1983, he guest-starred in one of the last episodes of Taxi and Quincy, M.E. In 1984, he starred in the television film Call to Glory, which later became a weekly series.

== Personal life and last years ==
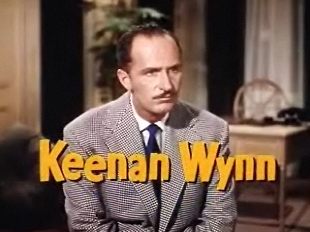
Tennessee Champ (1954)

Wynn was married to former stage actress Eve Lynn Abbott (1914–2004) until their divorce in 1947, whereupon Abbott married actor Van Johnson, one of the couple's closest friends. Abbott contended her marriage to Wynn was a happy one, but that her divorce and remarriage were engineered by MGM studio boss Louis B. Mayer, who refused to renew Wynn's contract unless Abbott divorced him and married Johnson, who was the subject of rumors that he was homosexual. One son, actor and writer Ned Wynn (born Edmond Keenan Wynn), wrote the autobiographical memoir We Will Always Live In Beverly Hills. His other son, Tracy Keenan Wynn, is a screenwriter whose credits include The Longest Yard and The Autobiography of Miss Jane Pittman (both 1974). His daughter Hilda was married to Paul Williams. He was an uncle by marriage to the Hudson Brothers. His granddaughter is actress Jessica Keenan Wynn.

In his later years, Wynn undertook a number of philanthropic endeavors and supported several charity groups. He was a long-standing active member of the Westwood Sertoma service club, in West Los Angeles.

=== Death ===
During his last years, Wynn suffered from pancreatic cancer, which caused his death on October 14, 1986. He was cremated at Glendale's Forest Lawn Memorial Park in its crematory. His urn was subsequently entombed within The Great Mausoleum, Daffodil Corridor, Columbarium of the Dawn, in a niche alongside his father Ed Wynn, his daughter Emily (February 13, 1960 – November 27, 1980), who died from lupus, and his aunt.

== Filmography ==
=== Film ===
- Somewhere I'll Find You (1942) as Sergeant Tom Purdy (uncredited)
- The War Against Mrs. Hadley (1942) as Voice of Radio Announcer (uncredited)
- For Me and My Gal (1942) as Eddie Milton (uncredited)
- Northwest Rangers (1942) as 'Slip' O'Mara
- Lost Angel (1943) as Packy Roost
- See Here, Private Hargrove (1944) as Private Mulvehill
- Since You Went Away (1944) as Lieutenant Solomon
- Marriage Is a Private Affair (1944) as Major Bob Wilton
- Without Love (1945) as Quentin Ladd
- The Clock (1945) as The Drunk
- Between Two Women (1945) as Tobey
- Ziegfeld Follies (1945) as Caller ('Number Please')
- Week-End at the Waldorf (1945) as Oliver Webson
- What Next, Corporal Hargrove? (1945) as Private Thomas Mulvehill
- Easy to Wed (1946) as Warren Haggerty
- The Thrill of Brazil (1946) as Steve Farraugh
- No Leave, No Love (1946) as Slinky
- The Cockeyed Miracle (1946) as Ben Griggs
- The Hucksters (1947) as Buddy Hare
- Song of the Thin Man (1947) as Clarence 'Clinker' Krause
- B.F.'s Daughter (1948) as Martin Delwyn Ainsley
- The Three Musketeers (1948) as Planchet
- My Dear Secretary (1948) as Ronnie Hastings
- Neptune's Daughter (1949) as Joe Backett
- That Midnight Kiss (1949) as Artie Geoffrey Glenson
- Annie Get Your Gun (1950) as Charlie Davenport
- Love That Brute (1950) as Bugsy Welch
- Three Little Words (1950) as Charlie Kope
- Royal Wedding (1951) as Irving Klinger / Edgar Klinger
- Kind Lady (1951) as Edwards' Butler
- Texas Carnival (1951) as Dan Sabinas
- Angels in the Outfield (1951) as Fred Bayles
- It's a Big Country (1951) as Michael Fisher
- Phone Call from a Stranger (1952) as Eddie Hoke
- The Belle of New York (1952) as Max Ferris
- Skirts Ahoy! (1952) as Himself (uncredited)
- Holiday for Sinners (1952) as Joe Piavi
- Fearless Fagan (1952) as Sergeant Kellwin – Company J
- Desperate Search (1952) as Brandy
- Sky Full of Moon (1952) as Al
- Battle Circus (1953) as Sergeant Orvil Statt
- Code Two (1953) as Police Sergeant Jumbo Culdane
- Kiss Me Kate (1953) as Lippy
- All the Brothers Were Valiant (1953) as Silva
- The Long, Long Trailer (1954) as Policeman
- Tennessee Champ (1954) as Willy Wurble
- Men of the Fighting Lady (1954) as Lieutenant Commander Ted Dodson
- The Glass Slipper (1955) as Kovin
- The Marauders (1955) as Hook
- Running Wild (1955) as Ken Osanger
- Shack Out on 101 (1955) as George
- The Man in the Gray Flannel Suit (1956) as Sergeant Caesar Gardella
- The Naked Hills (1956) as Sam Wilkins
- Johnny Concho (1956) as Barney Clark
- The Great Man (1956) as Sid Moore
- Joe Butterfly (1957) as Harold Hathaway
- The Fuzzy Pink Nightgown (1957) as Dandy
- Don't Go Near the Water (1957) as Gordon Ripwell
- The Deep Six (1958) as Lieutenant Commander Mike Edge
- Touch of Evil (1958) as Bartender (uncredited)
- A Time to Love and a Time to Die (1958) as Reuter
- The Perfect Furlough (1958) as Harvey Franklin
- That Kind of Woman (1959) as Harry Corwin
- A Hole in the Head (1959) as Jerry Marks
- The Crowded Sky (1960) as Nick Hyland
- The Absent-Minded Professor (1961) as Alonzo P. Hawk
- The Joke and the Valley (1961 TV movie) as Lambert Giles
- The Big Bankroll (1961) as Tom Fowler
- Il re di Poggioreale (Black City) (1961) as Di Gennaro
- The Power and the Glory (1961 TV movie) as Wine Merchant
- Son of Flubber (1963) as Alonzo P. Hawk
- The Bay of St Michel (1963) as Nick Rawlings
- Man in the Middle (1964) as Lieutenant Charles Winston
- Dr. Strangelove (1964) as Colonel Bat Guano
- Honeymoon Hotel (1964) as Mr. Sampson
- Stage to Thunder Rock (1964) as Ross Sawyer
- The Patsy (1964) as Harry Silver
- Bikini Beach (1964) as Harvey Huntington Honeywagon
- The Americanization of Emily (1964) as Old Sailor
- Nightmare in the Sun (1965) as Junk Dealer
- The Great Race (1965) as Hezekiah Sturdy
- Promise Her Anything (1966) as Angelo Carelli
- The Night of the Grizzly (1966) as Jed Curry
- Stagecoach (1966) as Luke Plummer
- Around the World Under the Sea (1966) as Hank Stahl
- Warning Shot (1967) as Sergeant Ed Musso
- Welcome to Hard Times (1967) as Zar
- The War Wagon (1967) as Wes Fletcher
- Point Blank (1967) as Yost
- Run Like a Thief (1967) as Willy Gore
- Frame Up (1968) as Inspector Donald
- The Longest Hunt (1968) as Major Charlie Doneghan
- Finian's Rainbow (1968) as Senator Billboard Rawkins
- Once Upon a Time in the West (1968) as Sheriff, Auctioneer
- The Magic Pear Tree (1968 short) as Marquis (voice)
- Mackenna's Gold (1969) as Sanchez
- Smith! (1969) as Vince Heber
- The Monitors (1969) as The General
- 80 Steps to Jonah (1969) as Barney Glover
- Viva Max! (1969) as General Lacomber
- House on Greenapple Road (1970 TV movie) as Sergeant Charles Wilentz
- Loving (1970) as Edward
- Five Savage Men (1970) as Pudge Elliott
- Santa Claus Is Comin' to Town (1970 TV movie) as The Winter Warlock (voice)
- Assault on the Wayne (1971 TV movie) as Orville Kelly
- Pretty Maids All in a Row (1971) as Poldaski
- Cannon (1971) as Eddie
- The Man with Icy Eyes (1971) as Harry Davis
- Terror in the Sky (1971, TV Movie) as Milton
- The Manipulator (1971) as Old Charlie
- Panhandle 38 (1972) as Billy Bronson / Kile Richards
- Wild in the Sky (1972) as General Harry Gobohare
- Assignment: Munich (1972 TV movie) as George
- Cancel My Reservation (1972) as Sheriff 'Houndtooth' Riley
- The Mechanic (1972) as Harry McKenna ['Big Harry']
- Snowball Express (1972) as Martin Ridgeway
- VD Attack Plan (1973, Short) as Contagion Corps Sergeant (narrator)
- Hijack! (1973) as Donny McDonald
- Herbie Rides Again (1974) as Alonzo A. Hawk
- The Internecine Project (1974) as E.J. Farnsworth
- The Legend of Earl Durand (1974) as Colonel Nightingale
- Hit Lady (1974 TV movie) as Buddy McCormack
- Popcorn (1974, Short) (voice)
- Target Risk (1975, TV Movie) as Simon Cusack
- He Is My Brother (1975) as Brother Dalton
- Nashville (1975) as Mr. Green
- The Man Who Would Not Die (1975) as Victor Slidell
- The Devil's Rain (1975) as Sheriff Owens
- A Woman for All Men (1975) as Walter McCoy
- The Lindbergh Kidnapping Case (1976 TV movie) as Fred Huisache
- 20 Shades of Pink (1976 TV movie)
- The Quest: The Longest Drive (1976 TV movie) as Cooler
- The Quest (1976, TV Movie) as H. H. Small
- Jeremiah of Jacob's Neck (1976 TV movie) as Jeremiah Starbuck
- High Velocity (1976) as Mr. Andersen
- The Killer Inside Me (1976) as Chester Conway
- The Shaggy D.A. (1976) as John Slade
- Mission to Glory: A True Story (1977)
- Orca (1977) as Novak
- Sex and the Married Woman (1977 TV movie) as Uncle June
- Laserblast (1978) as Colonel Farley
- Coach (1978) as Fenton "F. R." Granger
- The Bastard (1978) as Johnny Malcolm
- Piranha (1978) as Jack
- The Lucifer Complex (1978) as U.S. Secretary of Defense
- The Billion Dollar Threat (1979 TV movie) as Ely
- The Dark (1979) as Sherman "Sherm" Moss
- Hollywood Knight (1979) as Jed
- Sunburn (1979) as Mark Elmes
- Parts: The Clonus Horror (1979) as Jake Noble
- The Glove (1979) as Bill Schwartz
- The Treasure Seekers (1979) as Meat Cleaver Stewart
- A Touch of the Sun (1979) as General Spelvin
- Just Tell Me What You Want (1980) as Seymour Berger
- Mom, the Wolfman and Me (1980 TV movie) as Grandpa Bergman
- The Monkey Mission (1981, TV Movie) as Stump Harris
- A Piano for Mrs. Cimino (1982 TV movie) as Barney Fellman
- The Capture of Grizzly Adams (1982 TV movie) as Bert Woolman
- The Last Unicorn (1982) as Captain Cully / Harpy (voice)
- Best Friends (1982) as Tom Babson
- Hysterical (1983) as Fisherman
- Return of the Man from U.N.C.L.E. (1983 TV movie) as Piers Castillian
- Wavelength (1983) as Dan
- Prime Risk (1985) as Dr. Lasser
- The Goonies (1985) as Chester Copperpot
- Code of Vengeance (1985 TV movie) as Willis
- Mirrors (1985 TV movie) as Reverend Dahlstrom
- Zoo Ship (1985) (voice)
- Black Moon Rising (1986) as Iron John
- Hyper Sapien: People from Another Star (1986) as Grandpa (final film role)

=== Television ===
- Alfred Hitchcock Presents (1958) (Season 3 Episode 35: "Dip in the Pool") as William Botibol
- Wagon Train – Episode: "The Luke O'Malley Story" (1958) as Luke O'Malley
- The Untouchables (1959–1961) as Augie 'The Banker' Ciamino / Joe Fuselli
- Goodyear Theatre — Episode: “Afternoon of the Beast” (1959) as Manuel Carrega
- The Twilight Zone – Episode: "A World of His Own" (1960) as Gregory West
- The Troubleshooters (1959–1960) as Kodiak
- Alfred Hitchcock Presents (1961) (Season 6 Episode 17: "The Last Escape") as Joe Ferlini
- Rawhide – Episode: "Incident at Cactus Wells" (1962) as Simon Royce
- Combat! – Episode: "The Prisoner" (1962) as Colonel Clyde
- Ben Casey – Episode: "Behold a Pale Horse" (1962) as O.J. Stanley
- Death Valley Days – Episode: "Grass Man" (1962) as Josh Tavers
- Bonanza – Episode: "Alias Joe Cartwright" (1964) as Sergeant O'Rourke
- Combat! – Episode: "The Flying Machine" (1966) as Lt. Brannagan
- The Wild Wild West – Episode: "The Night of the Freebooters" (1966) as Thorwald Wolfe
- Gomer Pyle, U.S.M.C. – Episode: "Show Me the Way to Go Home" (1966) as Harry Purcell
- Then Came Bronson – Episode: "The Old Motorcycle Fiasco" (1969) as Alex
- Lancer – Episode: "Blue Skies for Willie Sharpe" (1970) as Kansas Bill Sharpe
- Alias Smith and Jones (1971) as Artie Gorman / Horace Wingate / Charlie Utley
- Mod Squad – Episode: "And a Little Child Shall Bleed Them" (1971) as Luther
- Hawaii Five-O – Episode: "Journey Out of Limbo" (1972) as Hummel
- Cannon – Episode: "The Island Caper" (1972) as Matt Dixon
- Alias Smith and Jones – Episode: "What Happened at the XST?" (1972) as Artie Gorman
- McMillan & Wife – Episode: "The Devil You Say" (1973) as Professor Zagmeyer
- Hec Ramsey – Episode: "A Hard Road to Vengeance" (1973) as Bullard
- The New Perry Mason – Episode: "The Case of the Telltale Trunk" (1973) as Victor Harding
- The Girl With Something Extra – Episode: "Guess Who's Feeding the Pigeons" (1974) as Victor Lucas
- Kolchak: The Night Stalker (1974–1975) as Captain Joe 'Mad Dog' Siska
- Movin' On – Episode: "The Elephant Story" (1975) as Barnaby
- Emergency! – Episode: "Back-Up" (1975) as Wild Bill
- The Bob Newhart Show – Episode: "What's It All About, Albert?" (1975) as Dr. Albert
- The Bionic Woman – Episode: "Rancho Outcast" (1978) as Gustave
- Dallas – 10 episodes (1979–1980) as Digger Barnes
- The Littlest Hobo - Episode: "The Balloonist" (1980) as Gus Appleton (uncredited)
- Fantasy Island – Episode: "Mr. Nobody/La Liberatora" (1981) as Willie the promoter
- One Day at a Time – Episode: "Small Wonder II (1981) as Randolph Ericson
- The Greatest American Hero – Episode: "Good Samaritan" (1982) as Ira Hagert
- Hardcastle and McCormick – Episode: "Just Another Round of That Old Song" (1983) as Henry Willard
- Quincy, M.E. – Episode: "Whatever Happened to Morris Perlmutter?" (1983) as Morris Perlmutter
- Manimal – Episode: "Scrimshaw" (1983) as Clancy Sea Dog Morgan
- Taxi – Episode: "Tony's Baby" (1983) as Leo
- Tales from the Darkside – Episode: "I'll Give You a Million" (1984) as Duncan
- Highway to Heaven – Episode: "Popcorn, Peanuts and CrackerJacks" (1985) as Doc Brisby
- Call to Glory (1984–1985) as Carl Sarnac
- The Last Precinct (1986) as Butch
- The Fall Guy - Episode: "War On Wheels" (1986) as Sam Travers (Last TV role)
