= Jay Belasco =

American film actor (1888–1949)

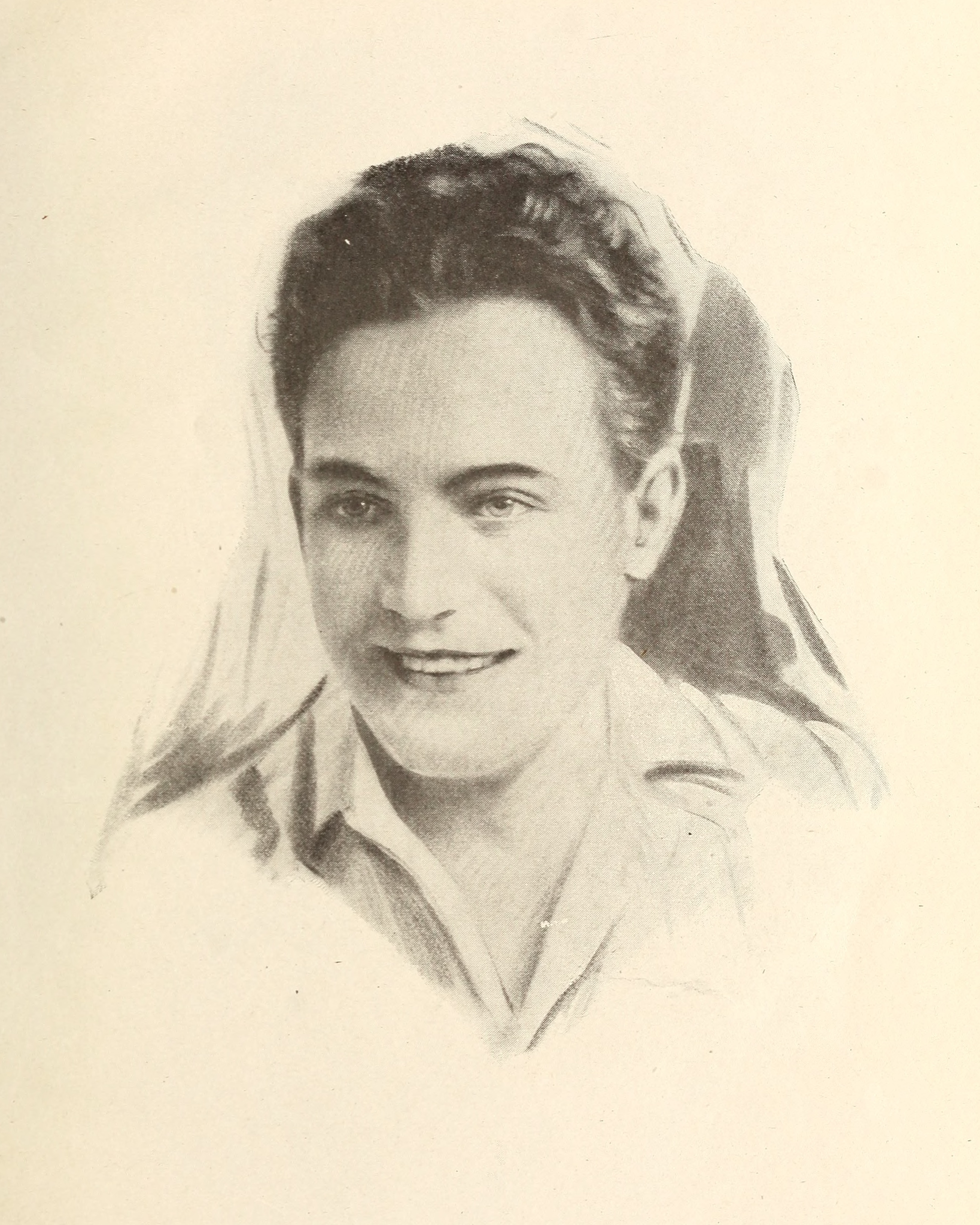
- Born: January 11, 1888; Brooklyn, New York
- Died: May 1, 1949 (aged 61); Santa Monica, California
- Occupation: Film actor

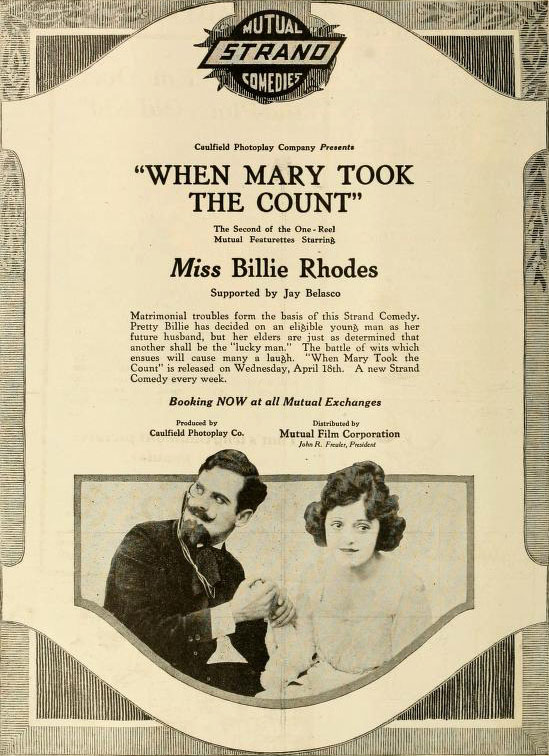
Advertisement, 1917

Jay Belasco (January 11, 1888 – May 1, 1949), born Reginald James Belasco, was an American film actor whose career mostly involved silent film. Belasco was born in Brooklyn, New York, and was a cousin of actors Walter Belasco and David Belasco. He died from a heart attack on May 1, 1949, in Santa Monica, California.

== Filmography ==
Year	Title	Role	Notes/refs
1915	Lord John in New York	Antonio Tostini	
1915	Lord John's Journal	Paolo Tostini	5-film series
1915	The Little Upstart	Paul Newell	Short
1916	Across the Line	Horton Manners Jr.	Short
1916	The Phantom Island	Robert Law	Short
1916	The Grip of Jealousy	Harry Grant	
1916	Tangled Hearts	Ernest Courtney	
1916	The Gilded Spider	Paul Winston	
1916	Bobbie of the Ballet	Jack Stimson	
1916	The Grasp of Greed	Eustace	
1916	The Belle and the Bell Hop	Salden	Short
1916	The Caravan	Chons	Short
1916	His Baby	Minor Role	Short, Uncredited
1916	Through Solid Walls	Dick	Short
1916	The Fascinating Model	Jay	Short
1916	The Price of Silence	Billy Cupps	
1917	How to Be Happy Though Married	Ernest	Short
1917	The Last Cigarette	Carson Huntley	Short
1917	Perils of the Secret Service	Carson Huntley	
1917	The Clash of Steel	Carson Huntley	Short
1917	The Dreaded Tube	Carson Huntley	Short
1917	David's Idle Dream	David	Short
1917	The Crimson Blade	Carson Huntley	Short
1917	The Man in the Trunk	Carson Huntley	Short
1917	Clothes and the Man		Short
1917	Twice in the Same Place		Short
1917	Her Hero		Short
1917	The Signet Ring	Carson Huntley	Short
1917	When Mary Took the Count		Short
1917	The Pace That Kills	The Other Man	Short
1917	The International Spy	Carson Huntley	Short
1917	And in Walked Uncle		Short
1917	Her Wayward Parents	Billy Harrison	Short
1917	Kleptomaniacs		Short
1917	The Great American Game		Short
1917	Fat and Foolish	The Dude	Short
1917	Trixie of the Follies	Jack	Short
1917	Two of a Kind		Short
1917	Bluffing Father		Short
1917	A Two-Cylinder Courtship	Jack	Short
1917	Lorelei of the Sea	Dorian	
1917	The Master Spy	Carson Huntley	Short
1917	Green Eyes and Bullets		Short
1917	Hearts and Clubs		Short
1917	Betty's Big Idea		Short
1917	Love and Locksmiths		Short
1917	Mary's Merry Mix-Up	Jack - Mary's Husband	Short
1917	More Haste, Less Speed		Short
1917	A Maid to Order		Short
1917	Stepping Out		Short
1917	Nearly a Papa	Jack Gordon	Short
1917	Their Seaside Tangle		Short
1917	Mary's Boomerang		Short
1917	Thirty Days	Mr. Newlywed	Short
1918	Their Honeymoon Baby		Short
1918	War Gardens		Short
1918	Her Awful Fix		Short
1918	Know Your Neighbor		Short
1918	Are Second Marriages Happy?		Short
1918	Three X Gordon	Walter	
1919	Life's a Funny Proposition	Herbert Austin	
1919	Hard Luck		Short
1919	Stop, Look and Listen		Short
1919	Tell Your Wife Everything		Short
1919	A Cheerful Liar		Short
1919	Lobster Dressing		Short
1919	A Flirt There Was		Short
1920	Smoldering Embers	Jack Manners	
1920	Jenny Be Good	Royal Renshaw	
1920	Dollar for Dollar	Teddy Mordant	
1920	Help Wanted - Male	Lieutenant	
1920	The Palace of Darkened Windows	Billy Hill	
1921	In for Life		Short
1921	Say Uncle		Short
1922	One Stormy Knight		Short
1924	Dandy Lions		Short
1924	Nerve Tonic	Eddie's Rival	Short
1924	Hold Your Breath	Another Customer	
1924	Tootsie Wootsie		Short
1924	Bright Lights		Short
1927	The Wrong Mr. Wright		
1931	Not So Loud		
1933	The Woman Accused	Tony Graham	
1934	Miss Fane's Baby Is Stolen	Friend of Miss Fane	Uncredited
1935	The Gilded Lily	London Cafe Patron	Uncredited
1935	The Wedding Night	Party Guest	Uncredited
1935	The Four-Star Boarder	Officer	Short, Uncredited
1935	Bonnie Scotland	Officer	Uncredited
1936	The Milky Way	Man in car	Uncredited
1936	Love Before Breakfast	Minor Role	Uncredited
1936	Our Relations	Denker's Beer Garden / Nightclub Customer	Uncredited
1941	Szeressük egymást		
1941	Footlight Fever	Costumer	Uncredited, (final film role)
