= Women Who Give =

1924 film

- Directed by: Reginald Barker
- Written by: A. P. Younger; Bernard McConville; J. G. Hawks
- Based on: Cape Cod Folk by Sarah P. MacLean
- Produced by: Louis B. Mayer
- Starring: Barbara Bedford; Renée Adorée
- Cinematography: Percy Hilburn fr
- Production company: Louis B. Mayer Productions
- Distributed by: Metro-Goldwyn-Mayer
- Release date: March 3, 1924
- Running time: 80 minutes
- Country: United States
- Language: Silent (English intertitles)

Women Who Give is a 1924 American silent drama film directed by Reginald Barker. It starred Barbara Bedford, Renée Adorée and Frank Keenan. Based upon the novel Cape Cod Folk by Sarah P. MacLean, it was produced by Louis B. Mayer Productions and distributed by MGM.

== Plot ==
As described in a film magazine review, stern Cape Cod businessman Jonathan Swift has high ambitions for his two children. To prevent a match between his son Noah and Becky, the daughter of Captain Bijonah Keeler, he sends aboard ship. Becky, fearing her approaching motherhood, runs away on Captain Joe Cradlebow's vessel. Captain Cradlebow is an unsuccessful suitor for Emily Swift's hand. The fishing fleet returns home in a terrible storm guided by the beacon light of Captain Keeler's blazing home, which he had set on fire. Noah weds Becky while Emily becomes the wife of Captain Cradlebow.

== Cast ==
- Barbara Bedford as Emily Swift
- Frank Keenan as Jonathan Swift
- Renée Adorée as Becky Keeler
- Robert Frazer as Captain Joe Cradlebow
- Joseph J. Dowling as Captain Bijonah Keeler
- Margaret Seddon as Ma Keeler
- Joan Standing as Sophia Higginbottom
- Victor Potel as Ephraim Doolittle
- Eddie Phillips as Noah Swift
- William Eugene as Ezra Keeler

== Preservation status ==
A print of Women Who Give survives in the MGM Studio library, Turner.
