= When the Door Opened =

1925 film directed by Reginald Barker

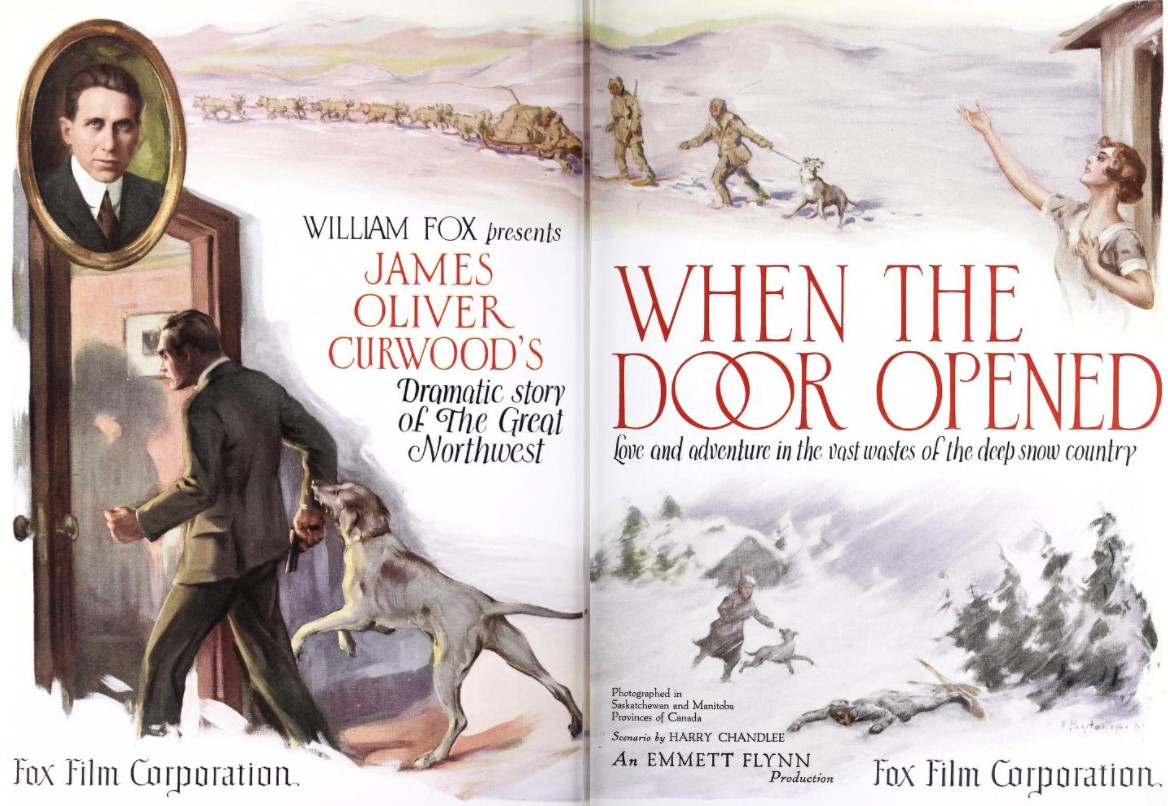
- Advertisement
- Directed by: Reginald Barker
- Screenplay by: Bradley King
- Based on: When the Door Opened by James Oliver Curwood
- Starring: Jacqueline Logan; Walter McGrail; Margaret Livingston; Robert Cain; Frank Keenan; Roy Laidlaw
- Cinematography: Ernest Palmer
- Production company: Fox Film Corporation
- Distributed by: Fox Film Corporation
- Release date: December 6, 1925
- Running time: 70 minutes
- Country: United States
- Language: Silent (English intertitles)

When the Door Opened is a lost 1925 American silent Northern film directed by Reginald Barker and starring Jacqueline Logan, Walter McGrail, Margaret Livingston, Robert Cain, Frank Keenan, and Roy Laidlaw. It was written by Bradley King. The film was released on December 6, 1925, by Fox Film Corporation.

== Plot ==
As described in a review in a film magazine, Clive Grenfel, returning home unexpectedly, saw "when the door opened" his wife in another man's arms. He kills this man Fredericks and seeks solace in the northwoods. There he meets stern old De Fontenac, a courtly gentleman of the old school, and his beautiful granddaughter Teresa, who falls in love with him. Believing himself a murderer, Clive fights against this love. A stranger appears and turns out to be a villain. Clive finally learns that the stranger is really Fredericks and that he has married Clive's wife who secured a divorce. No longer believing himself to be a slayer, Clive is now happy in the arms of Teresa.

== Cast ==
- Jacqueline Logan as Teresa de Fontenac
- Walter McGrail as Clive Grenfal
- Margaret Livingston as Mrs. Grenfal
- Robert Cain as Henry Morgan
- Frank Keenan as Grandfather de Fontenac
- Roy Laidlaw as O'Flaherty
- Diana Miller as Siren
- Walter Chung as Oh My
