= Smoldering Embers =

1920 film

Lonesome Corners
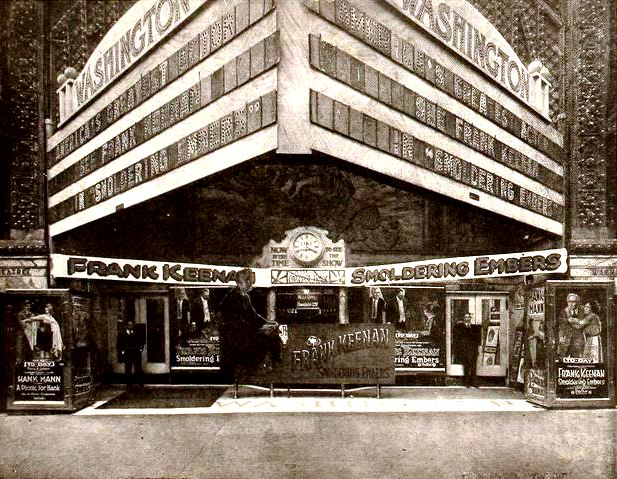
- Directed by: Frank Keenan
- Written by: Kate Corbaley; Dorothy Yost
- Starring: Frank Keenan; Jay Belasco; Katherine Van Buren
- Cinematography: Robert Newhard
- Production company: Frank Keenan Productions
- Distributed by: Pathé Exchange
- Release date: February 29, 1920
- Running time: 50 minutes
- Country: United States
- Languages: Silent; English intertitles

Smoldering Embers is a 1920 American silent drama film directed by Frank Keenan and starring Keenan, Jay Belasco and Katherine Van Buren.

== Cast ==
- Frank Keenan as John Conroy
- Jay Belasco as Jack Manners
- Katherine Van Buren as Beth Stafford
- Russ Powell as Tramp
- Graham Pettie as Tramp
- Hardee Kirkland as Horace Manners
- Lucille Ward as Annie Manners
- Frances Raymond as Edith Wyatt
- Tom Guise as Congressman Wyatt
- Burwell Hamrick as The Boy

== Bibliography ==
- Connelly, Robert B. The Silents: Silent Feature Films, 1910-36, Volume 40, Issue 2. December Press, 1998.
