= Stagecoach (1966 film) =

1966 film by Gordon Douglas

- Theatrical poster design by Norman Rockwell
- Directed by: Gordon Douglas
- Screenplay by: Joseph Landon
- Based on: Stagecoach 1939 film by Dudley Nichols; "The Stage to Lordsburg" 1937 story in Collier's by Ernest Haycox
- Produced by: Martin Rackin
- Starring: Ann-Margret; Red Buttons; Michael Connors; Alex Cord; Bing Crosby; Bob Cummings; Van Heflin; Slim Pickens; Stefanie Powers; Keenan Wynn
- Cinematography: William H. Clothier
- Edited by: Hugh S. Fowler
- Music by: Jerry Goldsmith
- Production company: Martin Rackin Productions
- Distributed by: 20th Century Fox
- Release date: June 15, 1966
- Running time: 115 minutes
- Country: United States
- Language: English
- Budget: $3.5 million
- Box office: $4 million (US/ Canada)

Stagecoach is a 1966 American Western film, directed by Gordon Douglas between July and September 1965, as a color remake of the Academy Award-winning John Ford 1939 classic black-and-white western Stagecoach. Unlike the original version which listed its ten leading players in order of importance, the major stars are billed in alphabetical order.

== Plot ==
In 1880, a group of strangers in Wyoming Territory boards the east-bound stagecoach from Dry Fork to Cheyenne. The travellers seem ordinary, but many have secrets that they are running from. Among them are Dallas, a prostitute who is being driven out of town; an alcoholic doctor, Doc Boone; pregnant Lucy Mallory who is meeting her cavalry officer husband; and whiskey salesman Samuel Peacock. As the stage sets out, U.S. Cavalry Lieutenant Blanchard announces that Crazy Horse and his Sioux are on the warpath; his small troop will provide an escort part of the way.

== Cast ==
| Actor | Role (Note: As indicated on the poster — character names are not specified in on-screen cast credits) |
|---|---|
| Ann-Margret | Dallas, The Dancehall Hostess |
| Red Buttons | Mr. Peacock, The Whiskey Salesman |
| Mike Connors | Hatfield, The Card Shark |
| Alex Cord | The Ringo Kid |
| Bing Crosby | Josiah Boone, The Alcoholic Doctor |
| Bob Cummings | Henry Gatewood, The Embezzler |
| Van Heflin | Curley Wilcox, The Marshall |
| Slim Pickens | Buck, The Stage Driver |
| Stefanie Powers | Mrs. Lucy Mallory, The Expectant Mother |
| Keenan Wynn | Luke Plummer, The Killer |

with
Brad Weston Matt Plummer
Joseph Hoover Lieutenant Blanchard
John Gabriel Captain Jim Mallory
Oliver McGowan Mr. Haines

David Humphreys Miller Billy Pickett
Bruce Mars Dancing Trooper
Brett Pearson Drunken Sergeant
Muriel Davidson Mrs. Ellouise Gatewood

Ned Wynn Ike Plummer
Norman Rockwell Busted Flush the Poker Player
Edwin Mills Sergeant Major
Hal Lynch Jerry the Bartender
and
The Westernaires US Army Cavalry

Uncredited (in order of appearance)
| Walker Edmiston | Cheyenne Wells Fargo agent |
| Priscilla Morrill | Eloise |
| Harry Carter | poker player |
| Ottola Nesmith | landlady |
| Kam Tong | Waldo |

=== David Humphreys Miller and Norman Rockwell ===
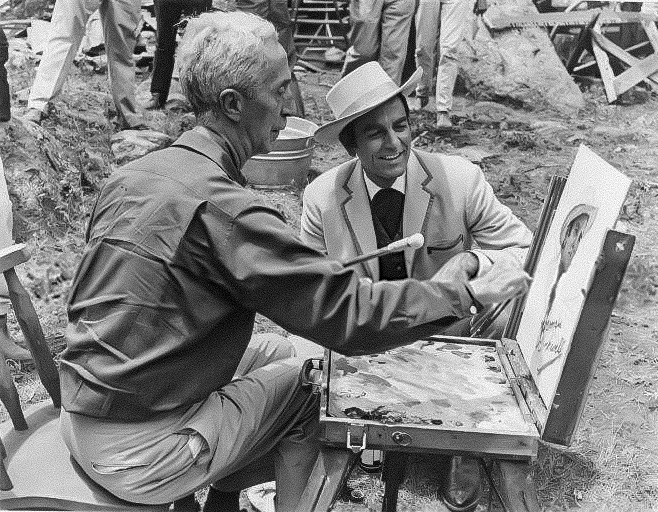
Mike Connors watches as Norman Rockwell paints his portrait on the set of Stagecoach

Also in the cast, playing their sole credited film roles, were two notable artists. Fifteenth-billed David Humphreys Miller, a 47-year-old western historian, specialized in the culture of the northern Plains Indians and was known for creating 72 portraits of survivors of the Battle of the Little Bighorn.

Twentieth-billed Norman Rockwell, aged 71, was engaged to be on the set to paint portraits of the stars and was assigned the small role of a town poker player nicknamed Busted Flush. The film's closing-credits sequence features the full-screen inscription, THE CAST AS PAINTED BY NORMAN ROCKWELL, followed by images of each of the ten leading players in the same order as in the opening credits. The portraits were also used in the poster for the film.

== Production ==
=== Development ===
Producer Martin Rackin said he became interested in making the movie after he finished a stint as head of production at Paramount. He said he felt the original was dated and modern audiences were not that familiar with it. He also believed Westerns were the "bread and butter of the industry".

A friend of his was buying the rights to the film, but was short of money. Rackin stepped in and succeeded in selling the film to Darryl F. Zanuck at Fox.

He hired Gordon Douglas to direct. The men had worked together ten times before and Rackin called him "the most underrated director in Hollywood – he even made Harlow look interesting – a workhorse who keeps helping out when a studio is in trouble and just hasn't had the right material."

Alex Cord was recommended to Rackin by Edmond O'Brien and Richard Quine.

=== Locations ===
Filming started July 6, 1965. Location scenes included Boulder, Colorado.

A statement in end credits reads: "The Producers express their appreciation to the owners of the Caribou Country Club Ranch at Nederland, Colorado, and to the Park Department of that state, for their cooperation in the making of this film."

=== Comparison to 1939 film ===
In parallel with the 1939 version, Ann-Margret replaces Claire Trevor as the dancehall hostess/prostitute Dallas. Red Buttons takes the role of Mr. Peacock, the alcohol peddler in a minister's garb, played in 1939 by Donald Meek. Michael Connors portrays the tough gambler, Hatfield, originated by John Carradine.

Alex Cord is the Ringo Kid, the role that made John Wayne into a star beyond the quickly made low-budget B-western series which had primarily represented his screen appearances during the 1930s. Bing Crosby, making his final major acting appearance in a theatrical feature, plays the alcoholic Doc Boone, bringing his own interpretation to the character portrayal which won Thomas Mitchell the 1939 Academy Award for Best Supporting Actor.

Bob Cummings plays the embezzling banker Gatewood, a role assigned in 1939 to Berton Churchill. Van Heflin, is the marshal, Curley, played in the original by George Bancroft. Slim Pickens is the coach driver, Buck, initially portrayed by Andy Devine and Stefanie Powers is the pregnant Army wife, Lucy Mallory, played in 1939 by Louise Platt.

Keenan Wynn is Luke Plummer, the patriarch of a family of killers, portrayed in 1939 by western star Tom Tyler. Joseph Hoover portrays the Lieutenant, a character originated by Tim Holt.

== Soundtrack ==
Opening credits

- Wayne Newton

sings "Stagecoach to Cheyenne"
Words and music by
Lee Pockriss and Paul Vance

Uncredited

- "Stagecoach Theme (I Will Follow)"

Music by Jerry Goldsmith
Lyrics by Ruth Batchelor
Orchestrated by Harry Betts
Vocal arrangement by Bill Brown
Performed by the Bill Brown Singers

- "Stagecoach To Cheyenne"

by Lee Pockriss and Paul Vance
Orchestrated by Shorty Rogers
Vocal arrangement by Bill Brown
Performed by the Bill Brown Singers

== Reception ==
=== Box office ===
According to Fox records, the film needed to earn $6,300,000 in rentals to break even and made $6,950,000, meaning it made a profit.

=== Critical ===
Variety summed it up as: "New version of "Stagecoach" is loaded with b.o. appeal. Ten stars repping a wide spectrum of audience interest, an absorbing script about diverse characters thrown together by fate, plus fine direction and performances are all wrapped up in a handsomely mounted Martin Rackin production...Crosby projects eloquently the jaded worldliness of a down-and-outer who still has not lost all self-respect. Much humor evolves from his running gag with Red Buttons, the preacher-dressed and -mannered liquor salesman played earlier by the late Donald Meek."

The New York Times review included: "The action fans may not be short-changed, but only a few of the principals achieve more than surface effects. In a decided departure from the norm, Bing Crosby, as the unshaven, sodden surgeon, is casual, natural, glib and mildly funny. Mr. Heflin is authoritative and taciturn as the marshal intent on keeping his prisoner, the Ringo Kid, from being shot down by the savage Plummers, and Mr. Cord is properly hard, sinewy and determined as that vengeful lone cowhand. [...] But "Stagecoach," after all, is a horse opera, and the horses, the eye-catching scenery, those dependable hands, and superb sound and fury make it an enjoyable trip most of the way."

Quentin Tarantino is an admirer of the film, saying it "can stand proudly alongside the John Ford version" and adding that he particularly enjoyed the performances of Bing Crosby, Alex Cord and Mike Connors, as well as the direction of Gordon Douglas.

Filmink argued Cummings was better than Barton Churchill in the 1939 original.

=== Film guide reviews ===
Leonard Maltin's Movie Guide (2014 edition) gave Stagecoach 2½ stars (out of 4), describing it as a "[C]olorful, star-studded Western" which "is OK, but can't hold a candle to the 1939 masterpiece". Maltin also calls it "[O]verlong" and notes that "Wayne Newton sings the title song!". Steven H. Scheuer's Movies on TV (1972–73 edition) also granted 2½ stars (out of 4), characterizing it "[A]n all-star remake of the classic" and evaluating that "[T]he Ford version was better, but the action is still pretty good the second time around". A later edition (1986–87) shortened the capsule review to "[A]n all-star…" and "[A]ction is still pretty good…". A still later edition (1993–1994) retained "[A]n all-star", but revised the second sentence to "[D]oesn't live up to its predecessor, but OK on its own terms".

Assigning 2 stars (out of 5), The Motion Picture Guide (1987) posited that "[W]hy Hollywood insists on remaking classics will always be a puzzle. John Ford's 1939 version of the Haycox story was a genuine western classic and this is a genuine western omelette. The presence of Crosby, in his last acting job in movies, saves the movie from being a total mess. In 1986, a TV version of the picture was done with several country music stars in the leads, as well as Liz Ashley and Anthony Newley. It was so awful, it made this movie look good by comparison". Later in its write-up, The Guide opines that "[W]hereas the original had engaging characters and not all that much violence, this one concentrates on bloodletting, the dialog is a failed attempt to be 'adult', and the performances are generally substandard. Norman Rockwell appears briefly. He'd done the excellent portraits of the actors used with the end credit and they rewarded him with a role in the picture, his first and only. Wayne Newton sings 'Stagecoach to Cheyenne' (Lee Pockriss and Paul Vance). It's the kind of song one dislikes upon first hearing and hates upon the second".

VideoHound's Golden Movie Retriever (2011 edition) does not have a separate entry for the 1966 version but, at the end of its write-up for the 1939 classic is the sentence, "Remade miserably with [sic] in 1966 and again—why?—as a TV movie in 1986".

Among British references, TimeOut Film Guide critic Paul Taylor advised to "[L]ook again at the credits before you're tempted: this is the witless remake of Ford's classic, with neither colour nor Cord anything like adequate recompense for Bert Glennon's dusty monochrome or Wayne's early strut as the Ringo Kid" (from 2009 edition). Leslie Halliwell in his Film Guide (5th edition, 1985) felt even less charitable, denigrating it as an [A]bsolutely awful remake of the above; costly but totally spiritless, miscast and uninteresting". Finally, David Shipman in his 1984 Good Film and Video Guide, does not grant it any stars (Shipman's top number is 4), questioning "[Y]ou wonder why they dared – or bothered. In Ford's film (see previous entry), everything works, but here, almost nothing does". He concludes with "Keenan Wynn plays a bad man waiting for the stage to arrive. His professionalism, and that of Heflin and Crosby, are some consolation".
