= The Mimic (2020 film) =

- Official poster
- Directed by: Thomas F. Mazziotti
- Written by: Thomas F. Mazziotti
- Produced by: Benjamin Cox
- Starring: Thomas Sadoski; Jake Robinson; Austin Pendleton; Gina Gershon; Marilu Henner; Tammy Blanchard; Didi Conn; Josh Pais; Jessica Keenan Wynn; M. Emmet Walsh; Jessica Walter
- Cinematography: Timothy Gillis
- Edited by: Benjamin Cox
- Music by: Mitch Davis
- Production companies: Red Square Pictures; Only Child Films
- Distributed by: Gravitas Ventures
- Release dates: March 7, 2020 (Cinequest); February 5, 2021 (United States)
- Running time: 81 minutes
- Country: United States
- Language: English

The Mimic is a 2020 American comedy film written and directed by Thomas F. Mazziotti. It stars Thomas Sadoski, Jake Robinson, Austin Pendleton, Gina Gershon, Marilu Henner, Tammy Blanchard, Didi Conn, Josh Pais, Jessica Keenan Wynn, M. Emmet Walsh, and Jessica Walter in her final film role.

It had its world premiere at the Cinequest Film Festival on March 7, 2020. It was released on February 5, 2021, by Gravitas Ventures.

== Plot ==
A man suspects his friend may be a sociopath and goes to extreme lengths to uncover the truth about him.

== Cast ==
- Thomas Sadoski as The Narrator
- Jake Robinson as The Kid
- Austin Pendleton as The Driver
- Gina Gershon as The Woman at the Bar
- Marilu Henner as The Assistant Editor
- Tammy Blanchard as The Young Woman
- Didi Conn as The Gossip Lady
- Josh Pais as The Neurotic Lawyer
- Jessica Keenan Wynn as The Librarian
- M. Emmet Walsh as The Director
- Jessica Walter as The Editor
- Matthew Maher as The Waiter/Bartender
- Doug Plaut as The Writer

== Release ==
The film had its world premiere at the Cinequest Film Festival on March 7, 2020. In December 2020, Gravitas Ventures acquired distribution rights to the film, and set it for a February 5, 2021, release.

== Reception ==
On the review aggregator website Rotten Tomatoes, 55% of 20 critics' reviews are positive, with an average rating of 5.6/10. The website's consensus reads: "Although its darkly humorous look at sociopathy can be off-putting, The Mimic earns points for boldness and originality."
