= Robert Newhard =

American cinematographer (1884–1945)

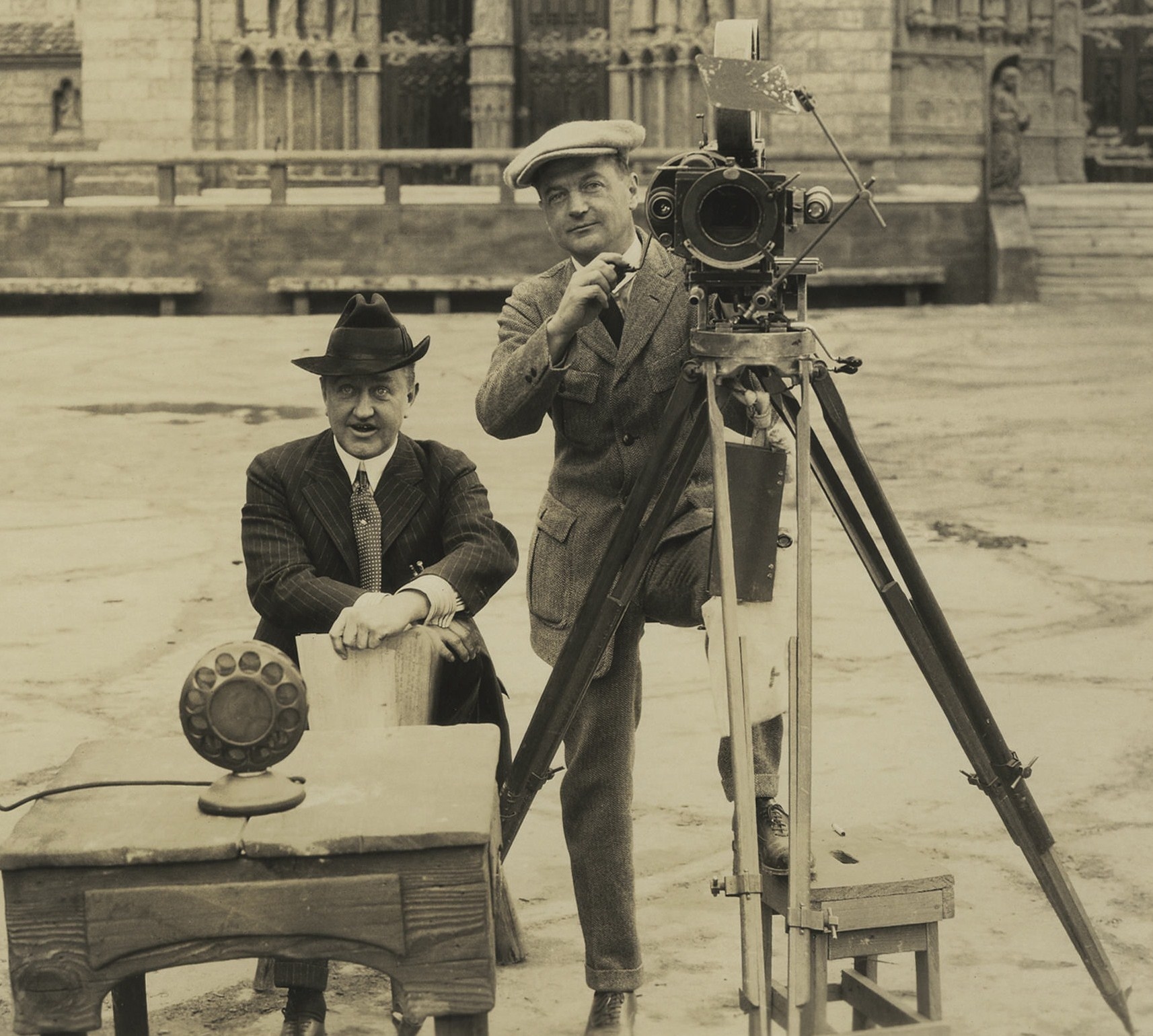
Newhard (right) on the set of The Hunchback of Notre Dame with director Wallace Worsley in 1923

Robert Newhard (April 28, 1884 – May 20, 1945), also known as Robert S. Newhard, Robert Newhardt, or Robert Newhart, was an American cinematographer.

== Biography ==
Newhard was born in Allentown, Pennsylvania, on April 28, 1884.

== Filmography ==
- The Bargain (1914)
- Two-Gun Hicks (1914)
- On the Night Stage (1915)
- The Coward (1915/I)
- The Iron Strain (1915)
- Civilization (1916)
- Where Love Leads (1916)
- The Iced Bullet (1917)
- The Crab (1917)
- Back of the Man (1917)
- Sweetheart of the Doomed (1917)
- Happiness (1917)
- Golden Rule Kate (1917)
- Carmen of the Klondike (1918)
- With Hoops of Steel (1918)
- Social Ambition (1918)
- His Birthright (1918)
- When Do We Eat? (1918)
- Fuss and Feathers (1918)
- A Man in the Open (1919)
- Happy Though Married (1919)
- Diane of the Green Van (1919)
- A Man's Country (1919)
- A Man's Fight (1919)
- The Street Called Straight (1920)
- Smoldering Embers (1920)
- Dollar for Dollar (1920)
- Everybody's Sweetheart (1920)
- Nobody's Kid (1921)
- Making the Grade (1921)
- Trail of the Axe (1922)
- Hungry Hearts (1922)
- Crimson Gold (1923)
- The Hunchback of Notre Dame (1923)
- Trail of the North Wind (1924)
- The Sporting Lover (1926)
- White Water (1926)
- Rubber Tires (1927)
- Lure of the Night Club (1927)
- Party Girl (1930)

== Death ==
Newhard died on May 20, 1945 in Los Angeles.
