= Jenny Be Good =

1920 film

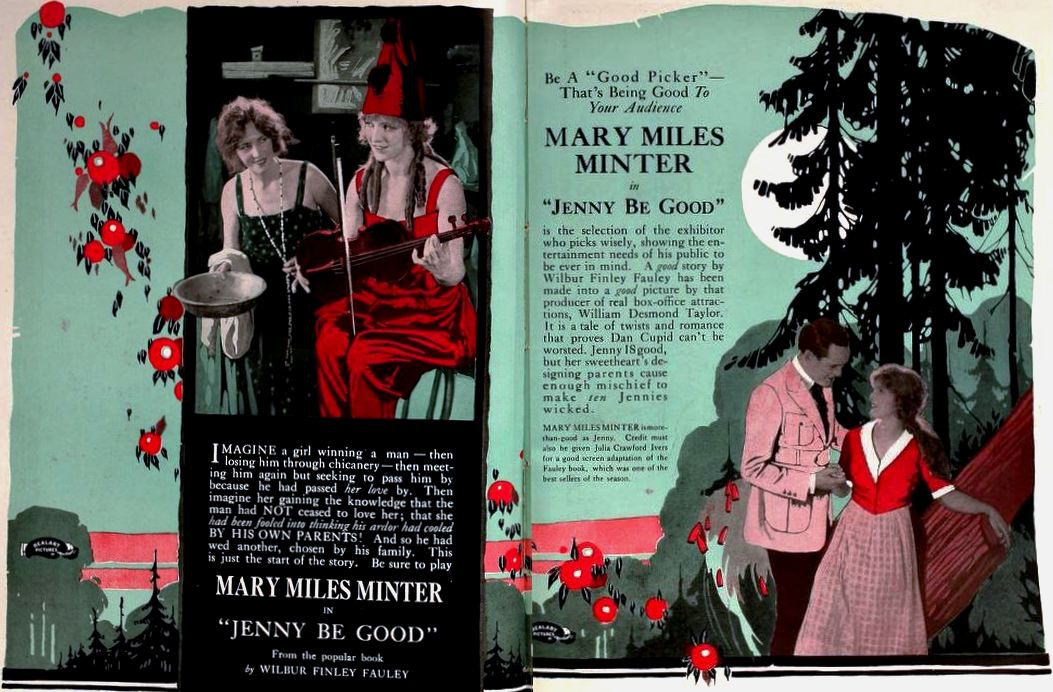
- Advertisement
- Directed by: William Desmond Taylor
- Screenplay by: Julia Crawford Ivers
- Based on: Jenny Be Good by Wilbur Finley Fauley
- Starring: Mary Miles Minter; Jay Belasco; Margaret Shelby; Fred R. Stanton; Sylvia Ashton; J. Edwin Brown
- Cinematography: James Van Trees
- Production company: Realart Pictures Corporation
- Distributed by: Realart Pictures Corporation
- Release date: May 30, 1920
- Running time: 6 reels
- Country: United States
- Language: Silent (English intertitles)

Jenny Be Good is a 1920 American silent romance drama film directed by William Desmond Taylor and starring Mary Miles Minter, based on a novel by Wilbur Finley Fauley and adapted for the screen by Julia Crawford Ivers. It is the last of Minter's films to also feature her older sister Margaret Shelby in a supporting role. As with many of Minter's features, it is believed to be a lost film.

== Plot ==
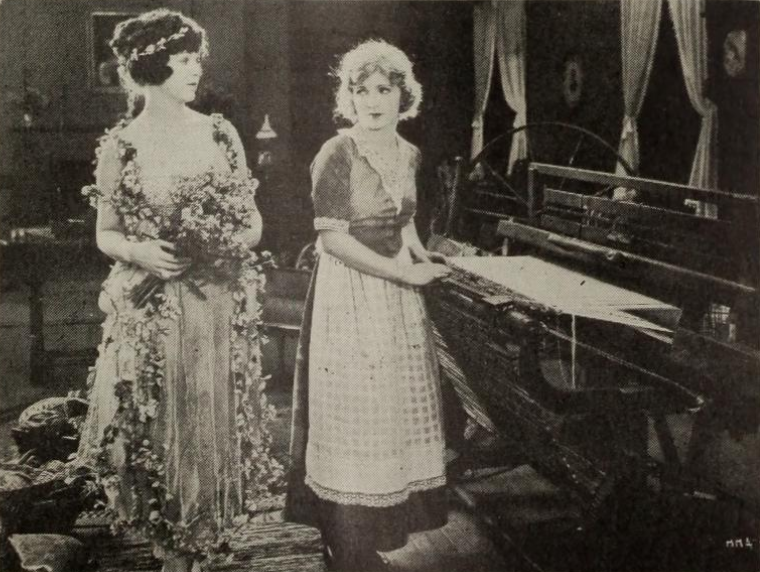
Mary Miles Minter and her sister Margaret Shelby in "Jenny Be Good" (1920)

As described in film magazine reviews, Jenny Riano, is an orphaned girl and a talented violinist, who is raised by her grandmother Nancy Beedle. She falls in love with Royal Renshaw, who is the son of the wealthy social climber Sophia Shuttles by her first husband. Mrs. Shuttles hopes to find a socially advantageous match for her son, and so does not approve of his relationship with Jenny. She would much prefer to see Royal wed to Jolanda Van Mater, whose mother has the status that Mrs. Shuttles desires.

Despite his mother's wishes, Royal weds Jenny in secret. When his mother finds out, she forces him to take a yachting holiday and, telling Jenny that he has abandoned her, convinces her to annul the marriage. Jenny's grandmother dies, and she travels to the city to become a concert violinist.

When Royal returns, he is unable to find Jenny, and his parents marry him to Jolanda. Jolanda, however, has become a drug fiend, after initially being given dope by local tea room owner Polly Primrose as a cure for a headache. Royal, who cannot forget Jenny, decides to commit Jolanda to a sanatorium. However, when she realises where he is driving her, Jolanda seizes the wheel of Royal's automobile and steers the car over a cliff.

Jolanda is killed in the crash, and Royal's life hangs in the balance. In hospital, he calls out constantly for Jenny, and his parents eventually relent and search for her. Jenny abandons her musical career to rush to Royal's side. With Jenny's care, Royal recovers, and the two are once again wed, openly this time.

The May 15, 1920 edition of Motion Picture News lists a musical cue sheet for the film.

== Cast ==
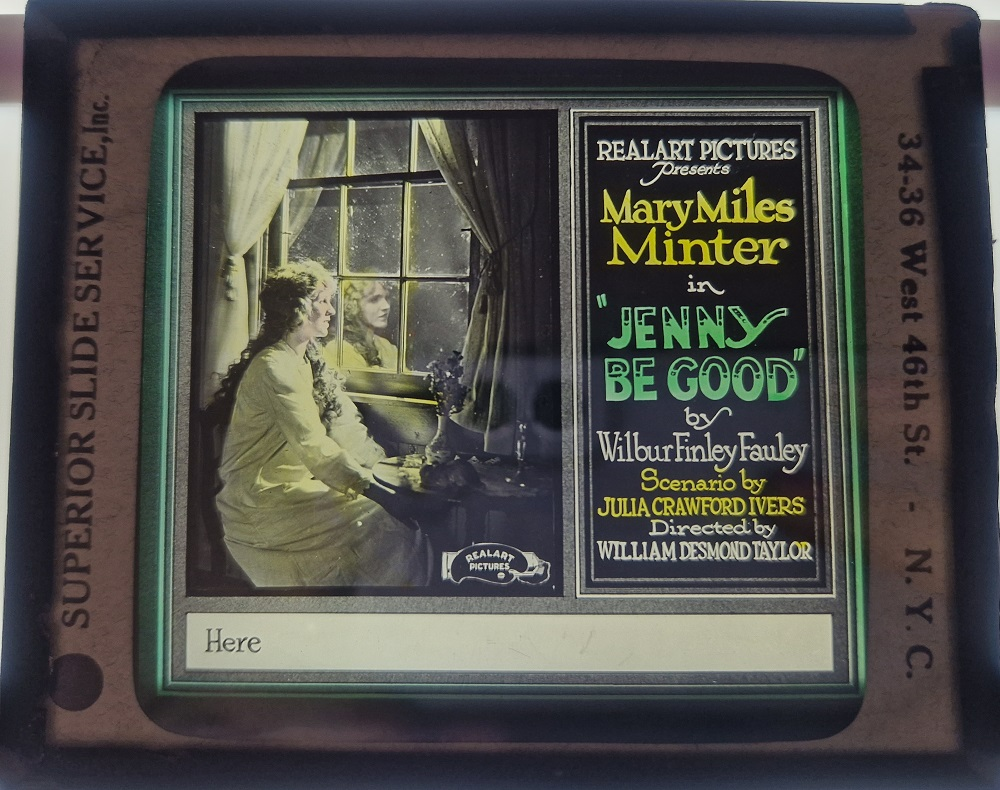
Lantern Slide for "Jenny Be Good"

- Mary Miles Minter as Jenny Riano
- Jay Belasco as Royal Renshaw
- Margaret Shelby as Jolanda Van Mater
- Fred R. Stanton as Aaron Shuttles
- Sylvia Ashton as Sophia Shuttles
- J. Edwin Brown as Professor Gene Jiggs
- Lillian Rambeau as Mrs. Van Mater
- Catherine Wallace as Polly Primrose
- Fanny Cossar as Clementina Jiggs
- Maggie Fisher as Nancy Beedle
- Grace Pike as Mrs. Rossiter-Jones
