= The Palace of Darkened Windows =

1920 film

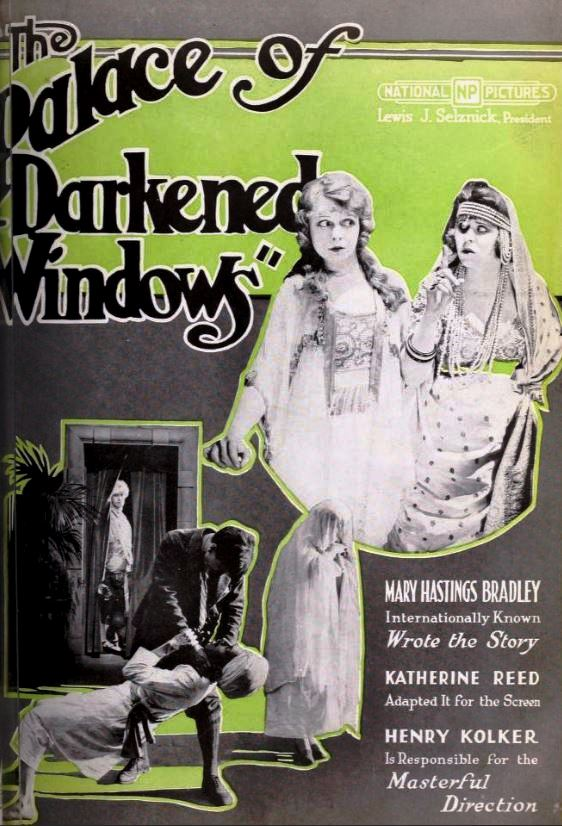
- Directed by: Henry Kolker
- Written by: Katherine S. Reed
- Based on: The Palace of Darkened Windows by Mary Hastings Bradley
- Produced by: Lewis J. Selznick
- Starring: Claire Anderson; Arthur Edmund Carewe; Jay Belasco
- Cinematography: Max Dupont
- Edited by: Laurence Creutz
- Production company: National Picture Theatres Inc.
- Distributed by: Selznick Pictures
- Release date: November 20, 1920
- Running time: 60 minutes
- Country: United States
- Languages: Silent; English intertitles

The Palace of Darkened Windows is a 1920 American silent comedy-drama film directed by Henry Kolker and starring Claire Anderson, Arthur Edmund Carewe and Jay Belasco. It is based on the 1914 novel of the same title by Mary Hastings Bradley.

== Cast ==
- Claire Anderson as Arlee Eversham
- Arthur Edmund Carewe as The Rajah
- Jay Belasco as Billy Hill
- Christine Mayo as Azade
- Gerald Pring as Captain Falconer
- Adele Farrington as Miss Eva Eversham
- Virginia Caldwell as Mispah
- Nicholas Dunaew as The Snake Charmer

== Bibliography ==
- Goble, Alan. The Complete Index to Literary Sources in Film. Walter de Gruyter, 1999.
