= Joseph Hoover =

American actor

- Joseph Hoover in The Man Who Shot Liberty Valance 1962
- Born: Joseph Frank Hoover; August 8, 1932
- Died: April 19, 2018 (aged 85)
- Occupation: Actor
- Years active: 1962–1983

Joseph Frank Hoover (August 8, 1932 – April 19, 2018) was an American film actor.

Roles include the young reporter in The Man Who Shot Liberty Valance, Captain Loomis in Hell Is for Heroes, and Lieutenant Blanchard in the 1966 remake of Stagecoach.

== Filmography ==
Year	Title	Role	Notes
1962	The Man Who Shot Liberty Valance	Charlie Hasbrouck – Reporter for 'The Star'	
1962	Hell Is for Heroes	Capt. Loomis	
1964	Fate Is the Hunter	Newsman	Uncredited
1965	Dear Brigitte	Reporter	Uncredited
1965	Black Spurs	Swifty	
1966	Stagecoach	Lt. Blanchard	
1968	The Astro-Zombies	Chuck Edwards	
