= Hilda Keenan =

American actress and vaudeville performer

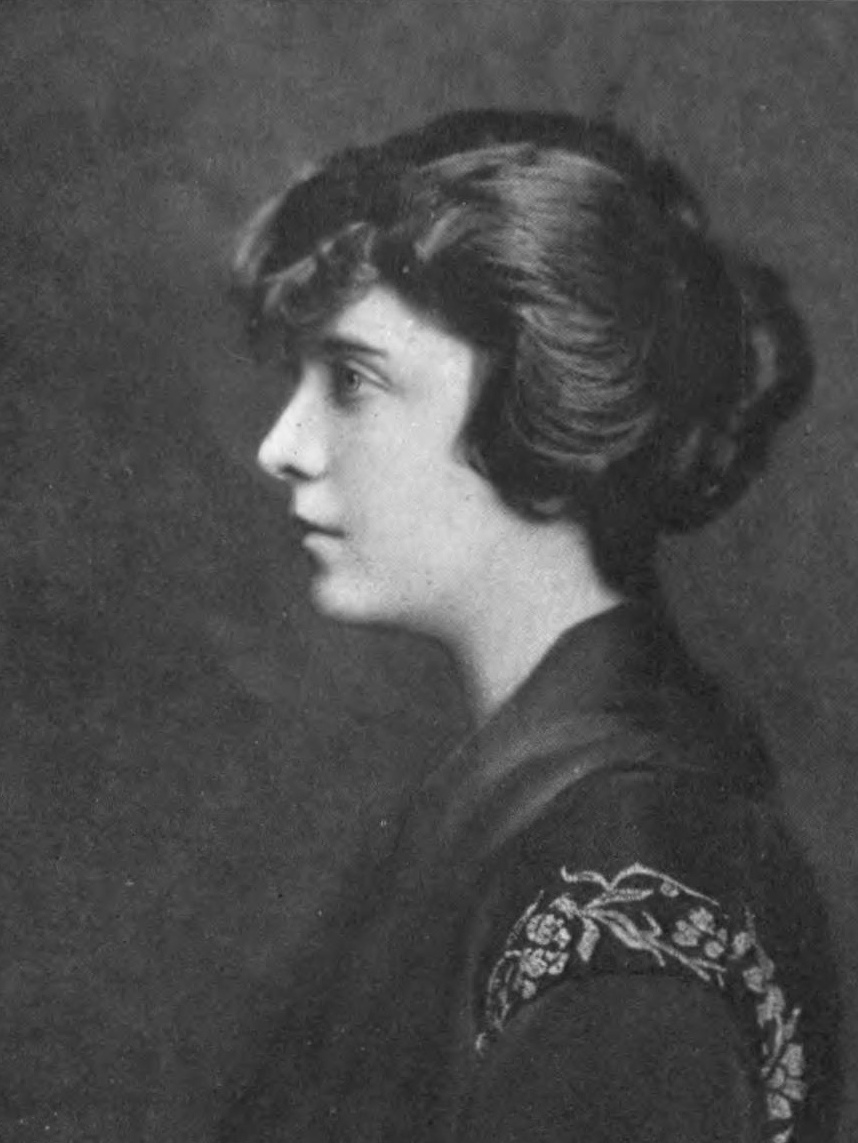
- Born: November 1891; New York City, U.S.
- Died: August 20, 1940 (age 48); New York City, U.S.
- Education: Wellesley College
- Occupations: Actress; vaudeville performer
- Years active: 1911–1940
- Spouse: Ed Wynn (m. 1914; div. 1937)
- Children: Keenan Wynn
- Father: Frank Keenan

Hilda Keenan (November 1891 – August 20, 1940) was an American actress and vaudeville performer, part of a family of actors including her father Frank Keenan, her husband Ed Wynn, and her son Keenan Wynn.

== Early life ==
Hilda Keenan was the daughter of actor Frank Keenan and New Brunswick-born Katherine Agnes Long Keenan. Her older sister Frances was also an actress. Keenan attended Wellesley College.

== Career ==
Keenan was in vaudeville with a one-act sketch called Sarah in 1911. She appeared in the plays The Heights (1911), The Road to Arcady (1912), Within the Law and The Salamander. In Within the Law, she co-starred with Margaret Illington; one critic commented that "Hilda Keenan's Agnes Lynch, a blackmailer, is noticeably excellent, and makes an engaging characterization of a rôle which ordinarily would scarcely win our friendly feelings."

== Personal life ==
Keenan was married to actor Ed Wynn from 1914 until their protracted, widely publicized and rancorous divorce in 1937. They had a son, actor Keenan Wynn. Hilda Keenan died in New York in 1940, aged 48 years, after years of mental illness including alcoholism.

Her grandson Tracy Keenan Wynn is a screenwriter and her great-granddaughter Jessica Keenan Wynn is an actress.
