= Frank Keenan =

American actor

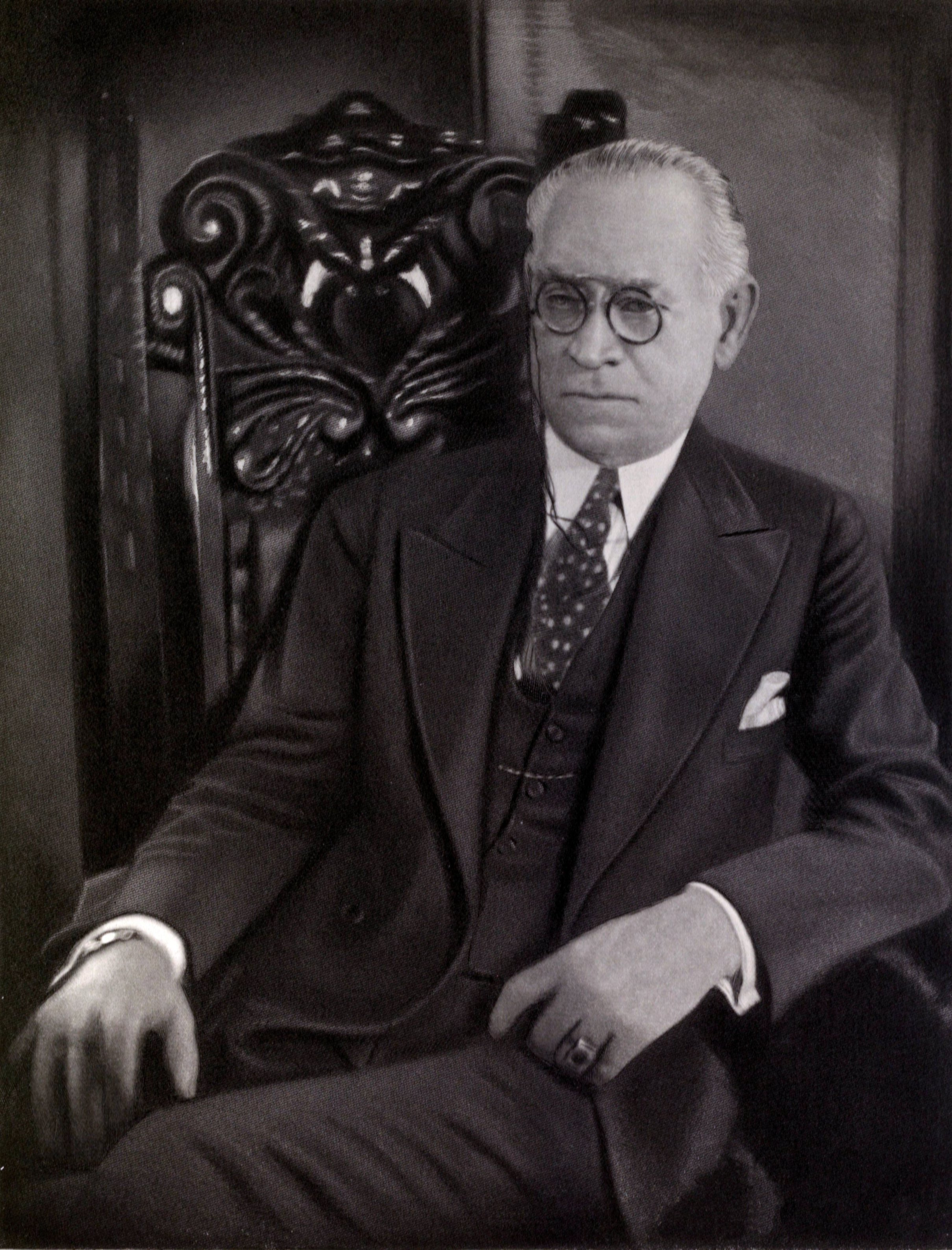
- Keenan, 1916
- Born: James Francis Keenan; April 8, 1858; Dubuque, Iowa, U.S.
- Died: February 24, 1929 (aged 70); Los Angeles, California, U.S.
- Resting place: Hollywood Forever Cemetery
- Occupations: Actor; director; manager
- Years active: 1900–1925
- Spouses: Katherine Agnes Long (m. 1880; died 1924) Margaret White (m. 1924; div. 1927) Leah May (m. 1928)
- Children: 2, including Hilda Keenan
- Relatives: Keenan Wynn (grandson); Tracy Keenan Wynn (great-grandson); Jessica Keenan Wynn (g.-g.-granddaughter)

Frank Keenan (born James Francis Keenan; April 8, 1858 – February 24, 1929) was an American stage and film actor and stage director and manager during the silent-film era. He was among the first stage actors to star in Hollywood, and he pursued work in film features for a number of years.

== Early life ==
Born to Irish Catholic parents in Dubuque, Iowa, Keenan acquired his education both there and at Boston College.

== Career ==
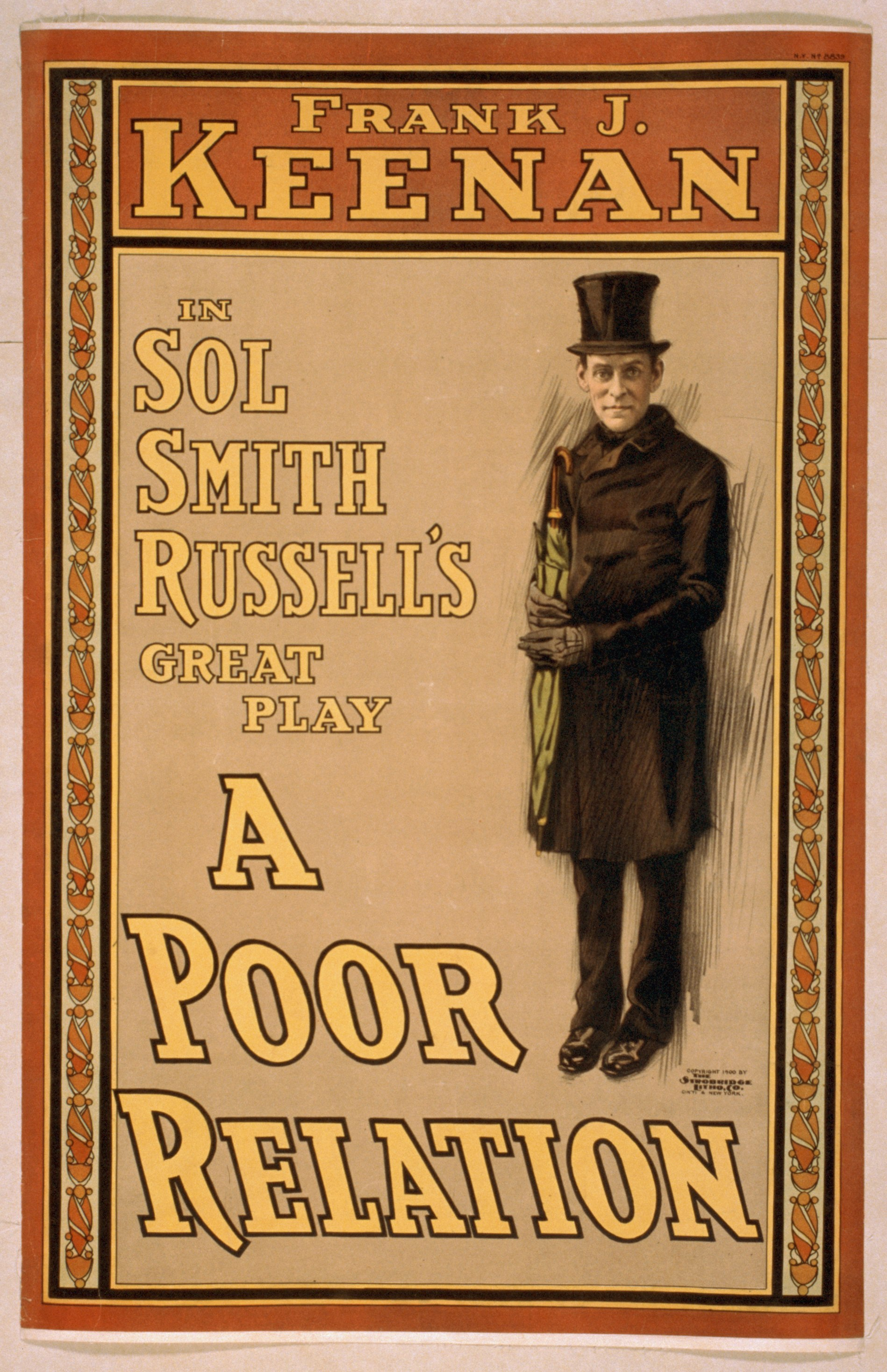
Poster for Keenan's performance of A Poor Relation (1900)

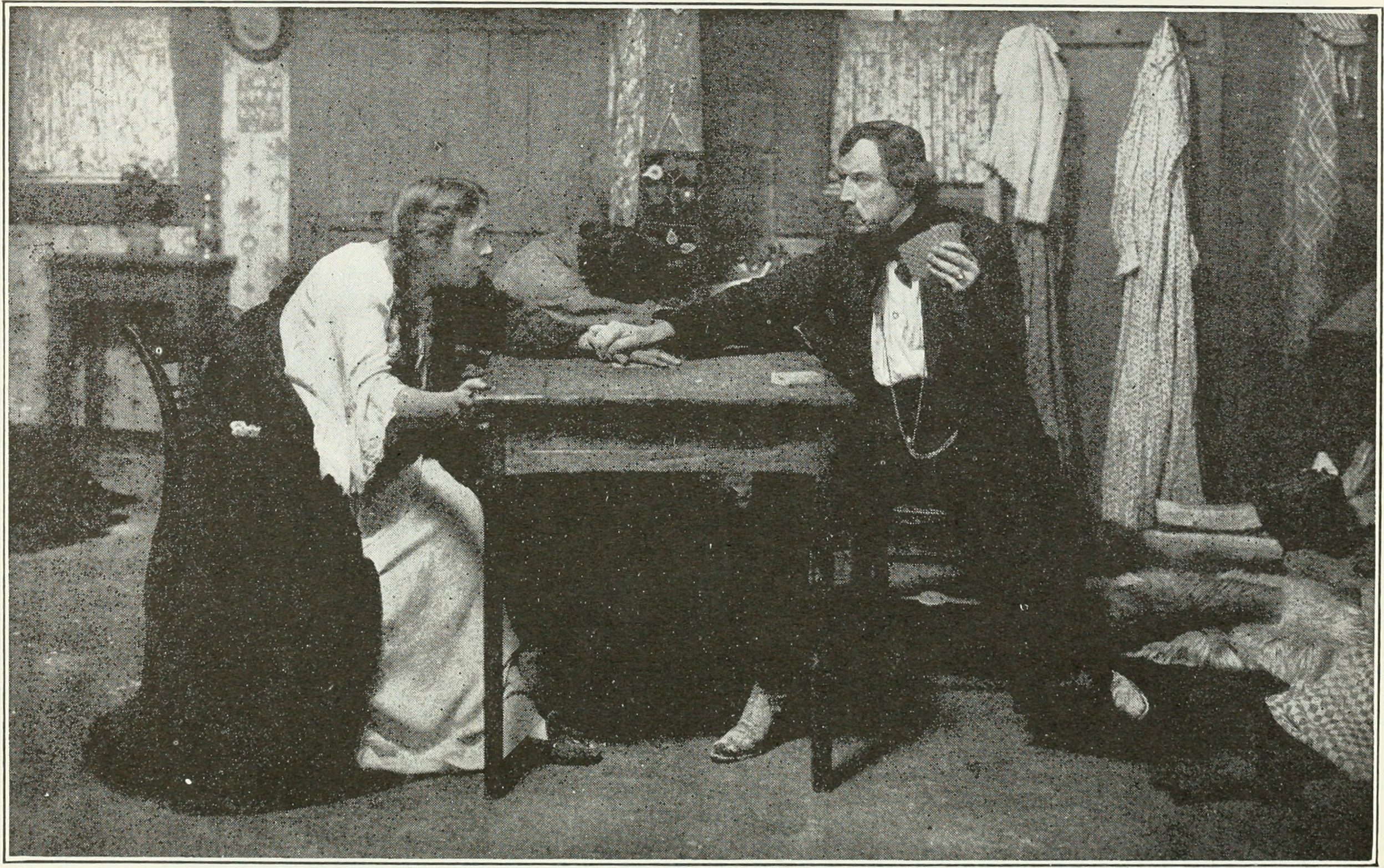
Blanche Bates and Keenan in the original Broadway production of The Girl of the Golden West (1905)

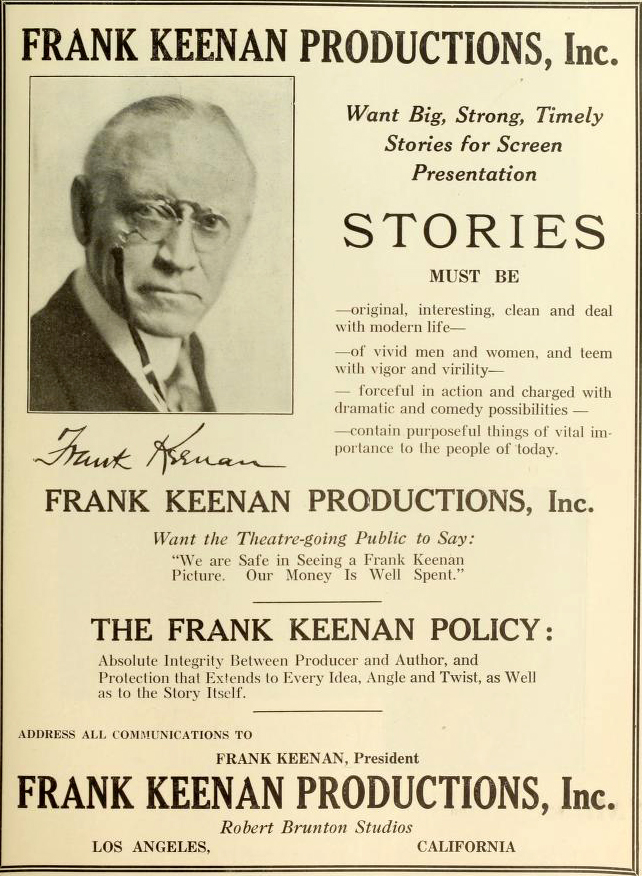
Advertisement (1919)

In New York, he became a star, a celebrated Shakespearean actor who later specialized in King Lear. He was a noted Broadway matinee idol, and his name appeared at the top of showbills. He acted in such hits as The Capitol, A Poor Relation and The Girl of the Golden West. He played the title role in Macbeth opposite Nance O'Neil. At one point, he briefly operated his own theater, the Berkeley Lyceum in New York, which brought him recognition as both actor and director.

Keenan made his screen debut under the direction of Reginald Barker in The Coward (1915). His career lasted into his late 60s, and he was a leader in the Actors' Equity Association. His last stage appearance, at 68, was as a Southern colonel in Black Velvet.

== Family ==
Keenan was married for many years to Katherine Agnes Long, who often acted with him. The Keenans had two daughters, Frances and Hilda, both of whom were stage and film actresses. His wife Katherine died in 1924; the same year, he married a young music teacher, Margaret White, from Los Angeles, but divorced her in 1927. By October 1928, at age 70, Frank Keenan remarried again, to a 41-year-old actress, Leah May from Atlanta, Georgia. By daughter Hilda he was the grandfather of actor Keenan Wynn and, in turn, the great-grandfather of actor and writer Ned Wynn (born Edmond Keenan Wynn) and multiple Emmy Award winning screenwriter Tracy Keenan Wynn. He is also the great-great-grandfather of actress Jessica Keenan Wynn.

== Filmography ==
=== Actor ===
- Camille (1926)
- The Gilded Butterfly (1926)
- When the Door Opened (1925)
- East Lynne (1925)
- My Lady's Lips (1925)
- The Dixie Handicap (1924)
- Women Who Give (1924)
- Scars of Jealousy (1923)
- Brass (1923)
- Hearts Aflame (1923)
- Lorna Doone (1922)
- Dollar for Dollar (1920)
- Smoldering Embers (1920)
- Brothers Divided (1919)
- The False Code (1919)
- The World Aflame (1919)
- The Master Man (1919)
- Gates of Brass (1919)
- The Silver Girl (1919)
- Todd of the Times (1919)
- The Midnight Stage (1919)
- The Bells (1918)
- More Trouble (1918)
- Ruler of the Road (1918)
- Loaded Dice (1918)
- Public Defender (1917)
- The Crab (1917)
- The Bride of Hate (1917)
- "War's Women" (1916)
- The Sin Ye Do (1916)
- Jim Grimsby's Boy (1916)
- The Thoroughbred (1916)
- Honor Thy Name (1916)
- The Phantom (1916)
- The Stepping Stone (1916)
- The Despoiler (1915)
- The Long Chance (1915)
- The Coward (1915)

…

- The Fisherman; Or, Men Must Work and Women Must Weep (1909)
- Judge Not That Ye Be Not Judged (1909)
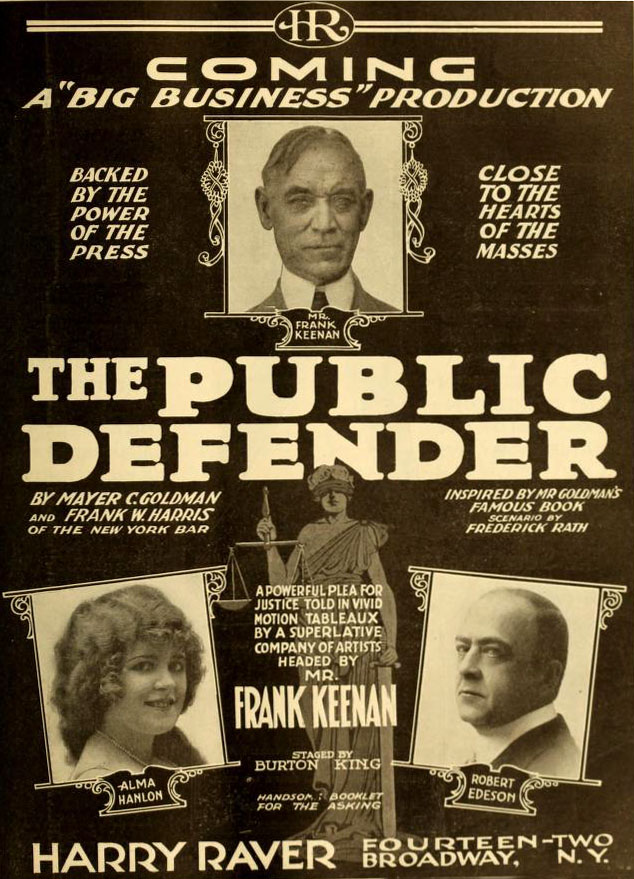
The Public Defender (1917)

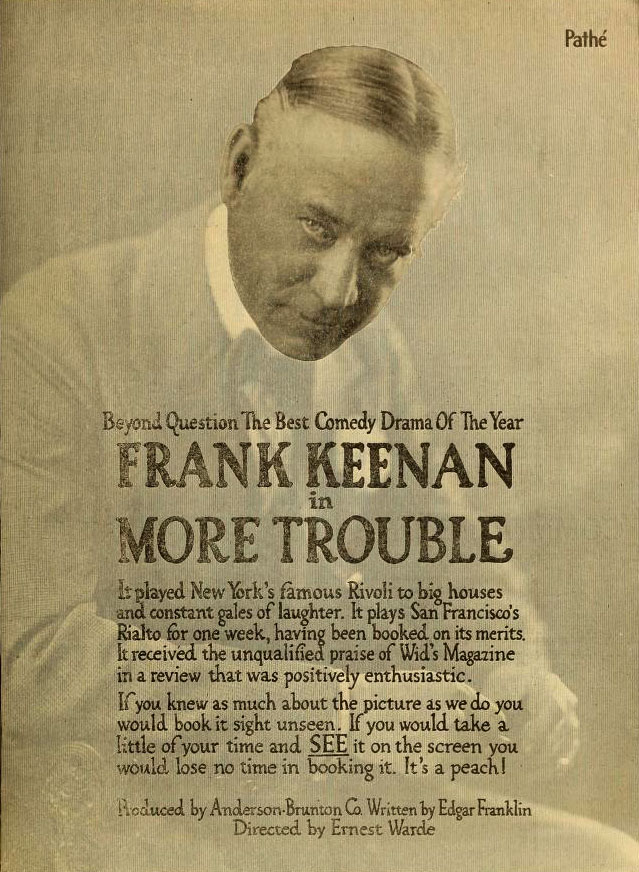
More Trouble (1918)

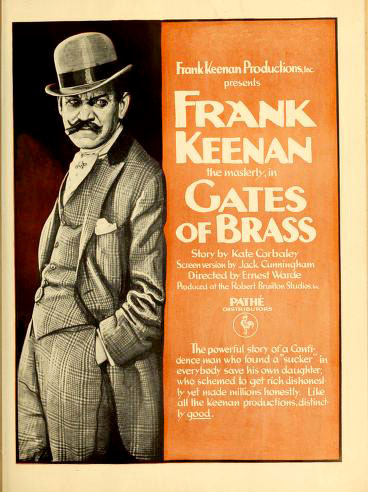
Gates of Brass (1919)

=== Director ===
- Dollar for Dollar (1920)
- Smoldering Embers (1920)
- Brothers Divided (1919)
- The Silver Girl (1919)

=== Producer ===
- Brothers Divided (1919)

=== Writer ===
- The World Aflame (1919)

== Stageplays ==
- Sherlock Holmes (1928)
- Peter Weston (1923)
- Hon. John Grigsby (1902)
- At the Threshold (1905)
- Strolling Players (1905)
- The System of Dr. Tarr (1905)
- The Lady Bookie (1905)
- The Lady Across the Hall (1905)
- A Passion in the Suburb (1905)
- The Cardinal's Edict (1905)
- A Woman's Pity (1905)
- The Warrens of Virginia (1907)

== Death ==
Keenan died of pneumonia in his Hollywood mansion, and is buried next to his first wife at Hollywood Forever Cemetery.
