= Tracy Keenan Wynn =

American screenwriter (born 1945)

- Born: February 28, 1945 (age 81); Hollywood, California, U.S.
- Occupations: Screenwriter; producer
- Years active: 1970–2005
- Parents: Keenan Wynn (father); Evie Wynn Johnson (née Abbott) (mother)
- Relatives: Frank Keenan (great-grandfather); Ed Wynn (grandfather); Hilda Keenan (grandmother); Ned Wynn (brother); Jessica Keenan Wynn (niece); Van Johnson (stepfather)

Tracy Keenan Wynn (born February 28, 1945) is an American screenwriter and producer, whose credits include The Longest Yard, The Autobiography of Miss Jane Pittman (both 1974), and The Deep (1977).

== Early and personal life ==
Wynn was born on February 28, 1945, in Hollywood, California. He is the son of Keenan Wynn and the grandson of Ed Wynn and Hilda Keenan; his great-grandfather was actor Frank Keenan. Wynn graduated from the University of California, Los Angeles with a bachelor's degree in fine arts.
