= The Coward (1915 film) =

1915 film directed by Reginald Barker

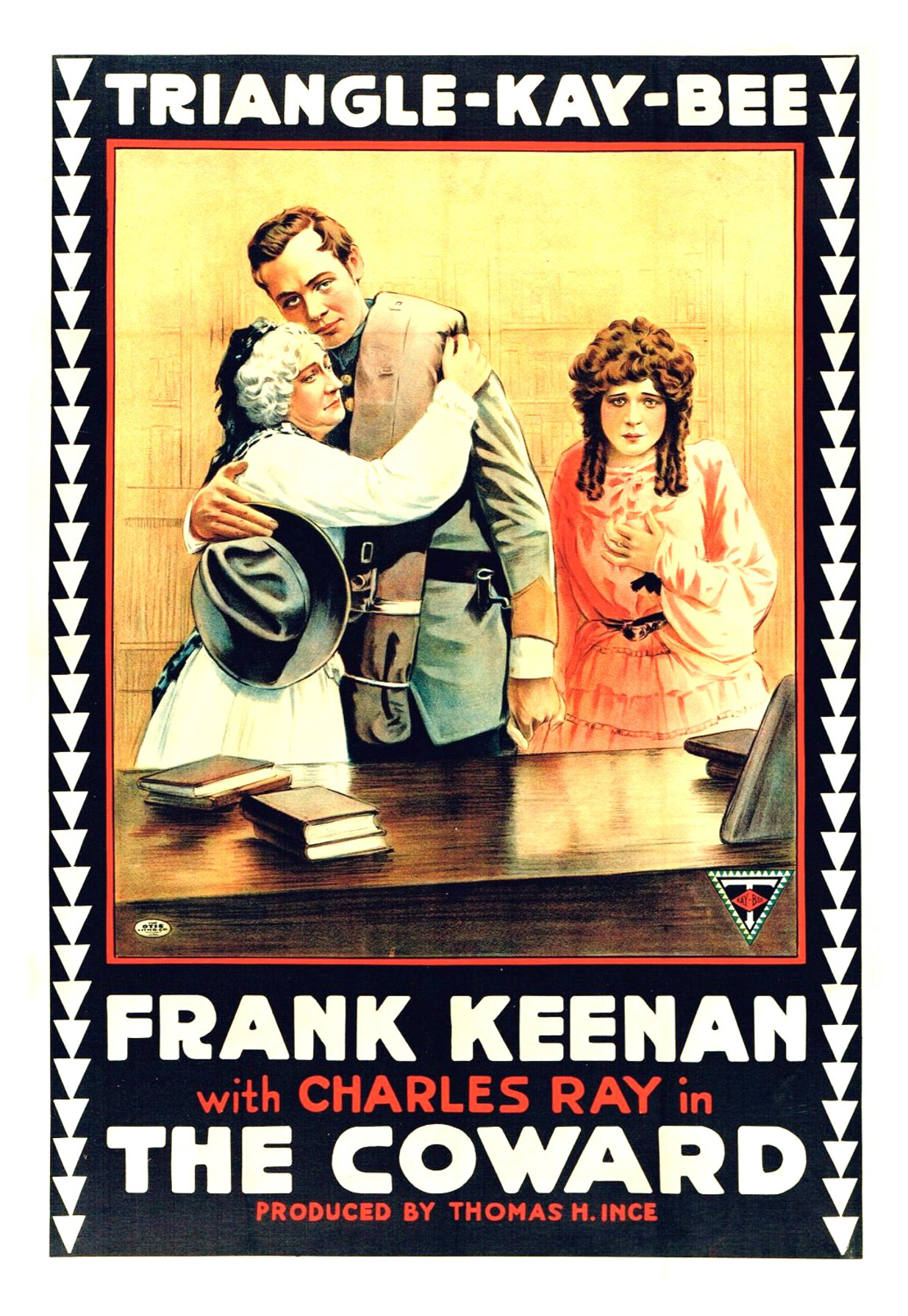
- Film poster.
- Directed by: Reginald Barker
- Screenplay by: Thomas H. Ince; C. Gardner Sullivan
- Story by: Edward Sloman; Thomas H. Ince
- Produced by: Thomas H. Ince
- Starring: Charles Ray; Frank Keenan; Gertrude Claire; Margaret Gibson
- Cinematography: Joseph H. August; Robert S. Newhard
- Production companies: Kay-Bee Pictures; New York Motion Picture
- Distributed by: Triangle Kay-Bee; Enterprise Distributing Corporation (re-release)
- Release date: November 14, 1915
- Running time: 77 minutes
- Country: United States
- Languages: Silent; English intertitles
- Budget: $17,922

The Coward is a 1915 American silent historical war drama film directed by Reginald Barker and produced by Thomas H. Ince. Ince also wrote the film's scenario with C. Gardner Sullivan, from a story Ince had bought from writer (and future director) Edward Sloman. The film stars Frank Keenan and Charles Ray. John Gilbert also appears in an uncredited bit part. A copy of The Coward is preserved at the Museum of Modern Art.

== Plot ==
The Coward (1915)

The film opens in Virginia in 1861 at the home of the Winslow family. Young Frank Winslow is enjoying an idyllic morning with his girlfriend when they hear a commotion and go to see what all the fuss is about. The American Civil War has finally begun, and the local boys are all jumping out of their skin with excitement to go enlist! His girlfriend turns to Frank with a look of adoration and pride, for surely he will be joining them.

Frank, however, is not keen on going to war, but what can he do? The pressure of the other men wanting to enlist to support the cause is bad enough, but the giddiness of the women is fomenting a sense of impending glory within the community that makes it almost impossible for him not to become swept up in this tide. At the last moment, however, he gets a hold of himself and runs home.

But the honor of the family name is more important than the wishes, or even the lives, of its sons and daughters. His father, Jefferson Winslow, makes it clear that he will shoot him if he doesn't go back to enlist. His merciless, malevolent gaze as he extends his hand toward the pistol on his desk induces more terror in his son than he was capable of feeling for himself. The gun scrapes across the wood as he picks it up, impressing the weight of this decision upon us and leaving a permanent scar on this prized heirloom.

They collect their things and return to the recruitment office together. We're back in the pomp and celebration of the townsfolk reveling in their hubris, willfully ignoring the terrible reality they are all about to face. Jefferson hounds Frank's steps, embodying the grave duty undergirding the festivities. Underneath the fanfare, every man knows that if he doesn't submit himself to the cause, his life in this community is over.

While patrolling the outskirts of the Confederate camp, Frank is overwhelmed by his fear of an upcoming battle, and deserts. Back at home, Jefferson recoils in shame and questions why he was born if only to be the father of such a coward. He determines to join the army in his son's stead, for when they call for Private Winslow, someone must be there to answer.

The war is going poorly for the Southern forces, and a Union army sweeps into town and occupies the Winslow home. Frank, hiding in the attic, overhears a group of officers discussing a weakness in the Union position that might give the compatriots he abandoned a fighting chance. He overpowers a guard on patrol outside the house and dons his uniform. Then, brandishing pistols, he bursts into the room with the officers, steals their deployment map, and makes a desperate escape toward the Confederate line with a contingent of Union soldiers in close pursuit.

Jefferson is now patrolling the outskirts of the Southern camp in his son's stead, and sees what he believes to be a Union soldier barreling toward his position. He unknowingly shoots Frank, who is quickly captured by a group of Confederates and taken to their headquarters. Frank gives his map to the commanding general who immediately recognizes the significance of this discovery, and furiously sets plans in motion to exploit this unexpected opportunity. Frank collapses, and is taken away for treatment.

In the ensuing battle, Jefferson distinguishes himself courageously, and the Confederate forces are victorious. That evening he is summoned to headquarters, being told only that a friend wishes to see him. He is ushered into a room and is proud to be greeted by the commanding general, who in turn is proud to present him to his wounded son. Seeing his injured boy, he is overcome and extends his arms to him, but shame proves stronger than love and he forces his arms back to his side. He tells the general that this man is mistaken for he does not recognize him, and leaves.

The general follows, and informs Jefferson that were it not for Frank, this battle never would have been won. Absorbing this news, Jefferson's rigid exterior finally melts, and he rushes back in to embrace his son. He collects Frank in his arms and kisses him with pride, thanking Heaven that all came out right in the end.

== Cast ==
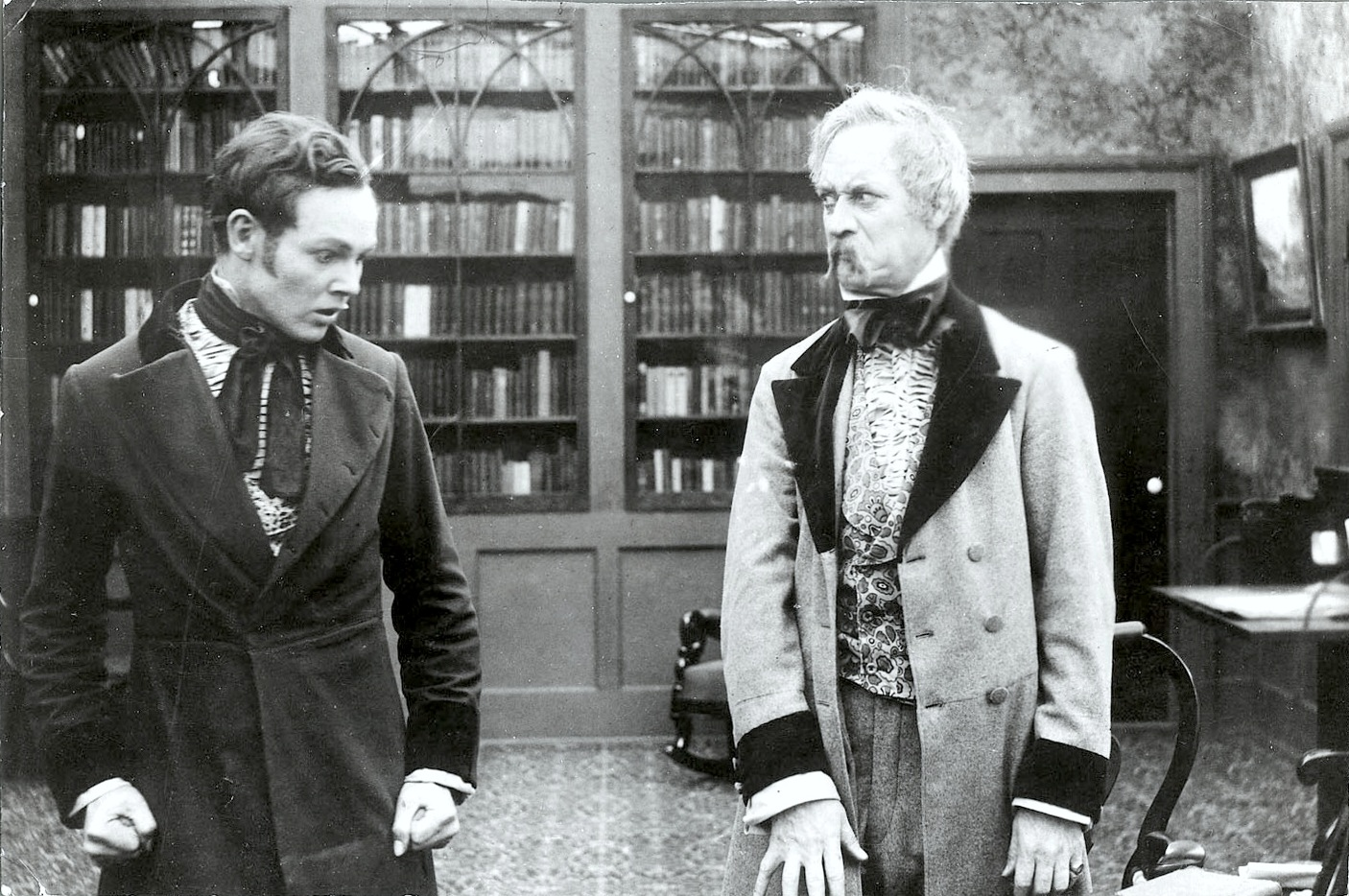
Still of Charles Ray as Frank Winslow and Frank Keenan as Col. Jefferson Beverly Winslow.

- Frank Keenan as Col. Jefferson Beverly Winslow
- Charles Ray as Frank Winslow
- Gertrude Claire as Mrs. Elizabeth Winslow
- Nick Cogley as a Negro Servant
- Charles K. French as a Confederate Commander
- Margaret Gibson as Amy
- Minnie Provost as Mammy
- John Gilbert as a Young Virginian (uncredited)
- Bob Kortman as a Union Officer (uncredited)
- Leo Willis as a Union Soldier (uncredited)

== Reception ==
The Coward was both a critical and financial success and helped to launch Charles Ray's career.

== Criticism ==
Unusually at the time, the main character is not presented as a gallant Southerner who is eager to fight in the war.

The acting in this film was much more natural than earlier films, with cutting and camera angles helping the actor's use of facial expressions and pauses to convey dramatic tension.

== See also ==
- List of films and television shows about the American Civil War
