= The Stepping Stone =

1916 film by Reginald Barker, Thomas H. Ince

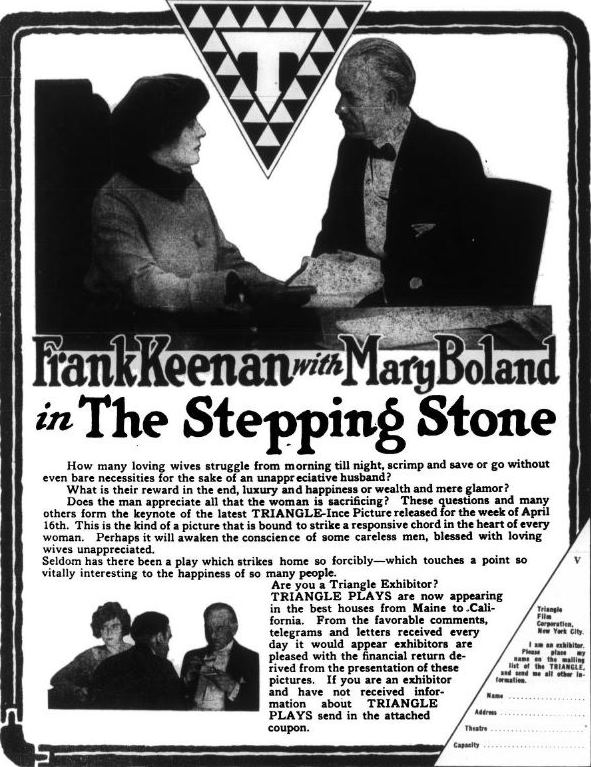
- Advertisement
- Directed by: Reginald Barker; Thomas H. Ince
- Written by: C. Gardner Sullivan (scenario)
- Produced by: Thomas H. Ince
- Starring: Frank Keenan; Mary Boland
- Production companies: New York Motion Picture; Kay-Bee Pictures
- Distributed by: Triangle Film Corporation
- Release date: April 16, 1916
- Running time: 50 minutes
- Country: United States
- Language: Silent (English intertitles)

The Stepping Stone is a 1916 American silent drama film, directed by Reginald Barker and Thomas H. Ince. It is a lost film.

== Plot ==
Mary Beresford (Boland) is the wife of unambitious law clerk Al Beresford (McKim). Thanks to Mary's tenacity and carefully calculated social-climbing, Al is promoted to the position of personal secretary of prominent financier Elihu Knowland (Keenan). Unfortunately, success goes to Al's head like a narcotic, and soon he has alienated everyone in New York, including Mary, who runs off for parts unknown.

== Cast ==
- Frank Keenan as Elihu Knowland
- Mary Boland as Mary Beresford
- Robert McKim as Al Beresford
- Margaret Thompson as Flora Alden
- Joseph J. Dowling as W. B. Prescott
- J. Barney Sherry as Horatio Wells
