= Dollar for Dollar =

1920 film directed by Frank Keenan

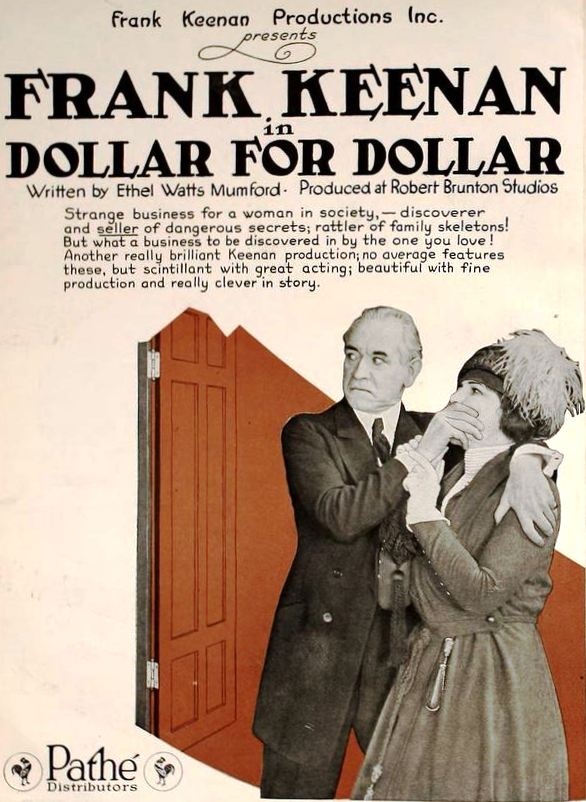
- Advertisement
- Directed by: Frank Keenan; Eliot Howe (assistant director)
- Written by: Ethel Watts Mumford
- Produced by: Frank Keenan
- Starring: Frank Keenan; Kathleen Kirkham
- Cinematography: Robert Newhard
- Distributed by: Pathé Exchange
- Release date: May 2, 1920
- Running time: 5 reels
- Country: United States
- Language: Silent (English intertitles)

Dollar for Dollar is a 1920 American silent drama film produced, directed by, and starring stage star Frank Keenan. It was written by Ethel Watts Mumford and distributed through Pathé Exchange.

It was filmed at various locations in the United States including Big Bear Lake, Big Bear Valley, and San Bernardino National Forest.

== Cast ==
- Frank Keenan as Marcus Gard
- Kathleen Kirkham as Mrs. Marteen
- Katharine Van Buren as Dorothy Marteen
- Harry von Meter as Victor Mordant (credited as Harry van Meter)
- Jay Belasco as Teddy Mordant
- Gertrude Claire as Mrs. Mordant
- Larry Steers as Lewis Denning
- Harry Kendall as Thomas Brencherly

== Preservation status ==
A copy of Dollar for Dollar is preserved at the EYE Institut Filmmuseum, Netherlands.
