= Jessica Keenan Wynn =

American actress (born 1986)

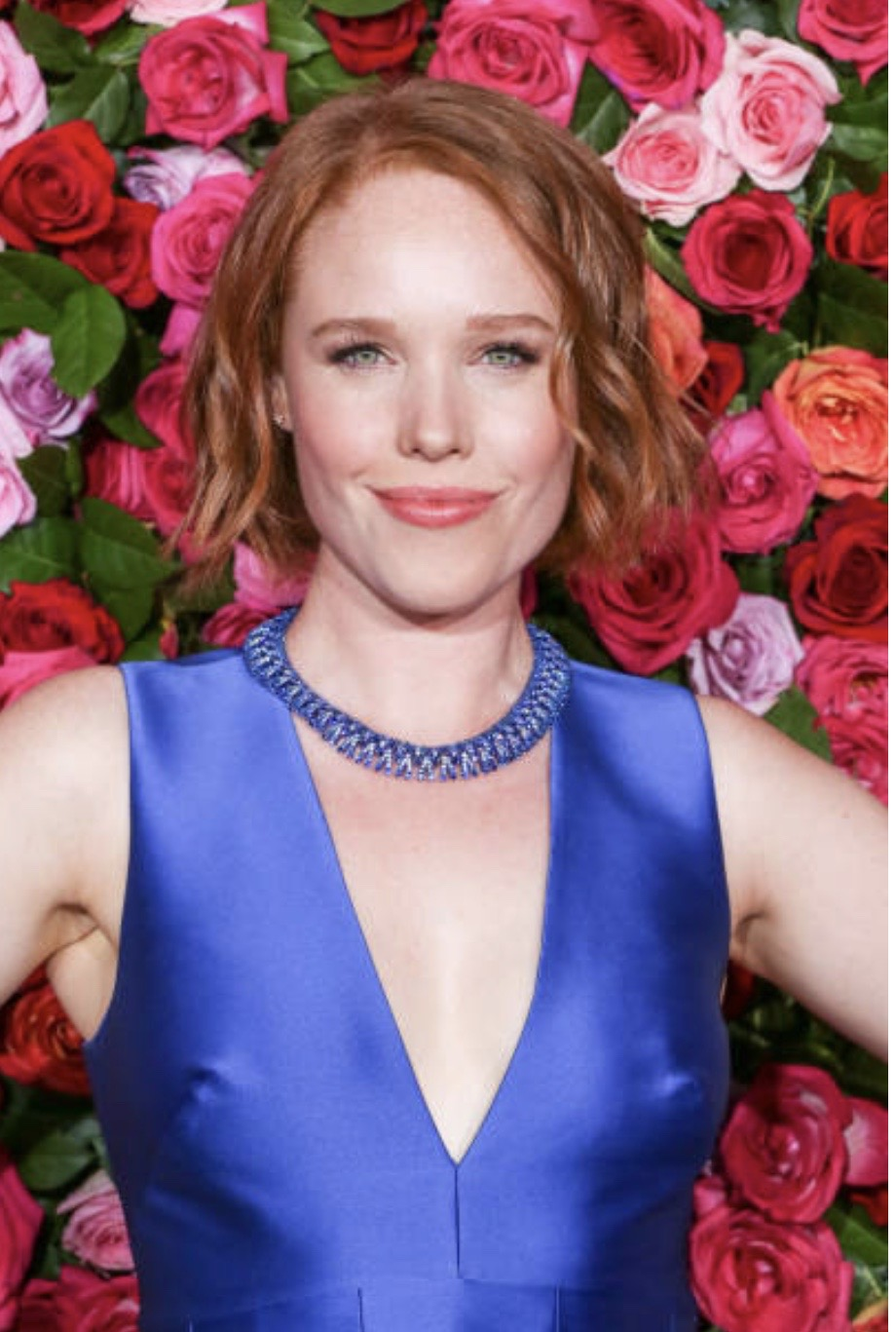
- Keenan Wynn at the 72nd Tony Awards in 2018
- Born: Jessica Keenan Armstrong; June 12, 1986 (age 40); Los Angeles, California, U.S.
- Occupation: Actress
- Years active: 1987, 2011–present
- Relatives: Frank Keenan (great-great-grandfather); Ed Wynn (great-grandfather); Keenan Wynn (grandfather); Ned Wynn (uncle); Tracy Keenan Wynn (uncle)

Jessica Keenan Wynn (born Jessica Keenan Armstrong; June 12, 1986) is an American actress. She is known for her roles as Heather Chandler in the off-Broadway production of Heathers: The Musical and Young Tanya in Mamma Mia! Here We Go Again. She is a successful voice-over artist and looper in New York City.

== Personal life ==
Wynn is the daughter of Edwyna "Wynnie" Wynn and Roger Armstrong. Her legal surname is Armstrong. She uses Wynn to carry on the name in show business: she is the niece of actor Ned Wynn and screenwriter Tracy Keenan Wynn; the granddaughter of Keenan Wynn, after whom she was named; the great-granddaughter of comedian Ed Wynn; and the great-great-granddaughter of Frank Keenan, all of whom were prominent actors. The Wynn family is considered an acting dynasty in Hollywood, alongside The Barrymores.

== Stage performances ==
Year	Title	Role	Notes
2011	Life Could Be a Dream	Lois	Los Angeles
2012	Les Misérables	Ensemble (u/s Fantine)	25th Anniversary National Tour (replacement)
2014	Heathers: The Musical	Heather Chandler	Off-Broadway
2015–2018, 2019	Beautiful: The Carole King Musical	Cynthia Weil	Broadway (replacement)
2020	A Killer Party: A Murder Mystery Musical	Justine Case	Musical Web-Series

== Filmography ==
=== Film ===
Year	Title	Role	Notes
2011	Go Green	Kat	Short film
2011	The House of Americans	Journalist	Short film
2018	Mamma Mia! Here We Go Again	Young Tanya	
2020	The Mimic	The Librarian	
2021	Clifford the Big Red Dog	Collette	
2026	Office Romance	Emily	

=== Television ===
Year	Title	Role	Notes
1987	The Golden Girls	Emily	Episode: "And Then There Was One"
2014	The Knick	Sister Theresa	Episode: "The Busy Flea"
2015	Forever	Dina	Episode: "The King of Columbus Circle"
2016	The Mysteries of Laura	Ingrid	Episode: "The Mystery of the Triple Threat"
2016	Billions	Cheryl	Episode: "YumTime"
2022–2024	The Ghost and Molly McGee	Fiona Dorothea Davenport (voice)	Recurring
