= The Longest Yard (1974 film) =

1974 film by Robert Aldrich

- Theatrical release poster
- Directed by: Robert Aldrich
- Screenplay by: Tracy Keenan Wynn
- Story by: Albert S. Ruddy
- Produced by: Albert S. Ruddy
- Starring: Burt Reynolds; Eddie Albert; Ed Lauter; Mike Conrad
- Cinematography: Joseph Biroc
- Edited by: Michael Luciano
- Music by: Frank De Vol
- Production companies: Paramount Pictures; Albert S. Ruddy Productions; Long Road Productions
- Distributed by: Paramount Pictures
- Release date: August 30, 1974
- Running time: 121 minutes
- Country: United States
- Language: English
- Budget: $2.9 million
- Box office: $43 million

The Longest Yard is a 1974 American prison sports comedy-drama film directed by Robert Aldrich, written by Tracy Keenan Wynn, based on a story by producer Albert S. Ruddy, and starring Burt Reynolds, Eddie Albert, Ed Lauter, Michael Conrad and James Hampton. The film was released as The Mean Machine in the United Kingdom and South Africa. The film follows former NFL player Paul Crewe recruiting a group of prisoners and playing football against their guards. It features many real-life football players, including Ray Nitschke of the Green Bay Packers.

The film has spawned three remakes: the 2001 British film Mean Machine starring Vinnie Jones; 2005's The Longest Yard starring Adam Sandler and featuring Reynolds as coach Nate Scarborough; and the 2015 Egyptian film Captain Masr. In the two international remakes, the sport was changed from gridiron football to association football.

== Plot ==
Former star pro football quarterback Paul "Wrecking" Crewe walks out on his wealthy girlfriend Melissa in Palm Beach, Florida. After taking her Citroën SM without permission and leading police on a car chase, and subsequent attack of two police officers, Crewe is sentenced to 18 months in Citrus State Prison.

The convicts disrespect Crewe because he was dismissed from the NFL for point shaving. The warden, Rudolph Hazen, is a football fanatic who manages a semi-pro team of prison guards. He wants Crewe to help coach the team and clinch a championship. Responding to pressure from the head guard and coach, Captain Wilhelm Knauer, a reluctant Crewe eventually agrees to play in an exhibition game. Crewe forms a prison team that includes Samson, a former professional weightlifter, and Connie Shokner, a killer and martial arts expert.

Aided by the clever Caretaker, former professional player Nate Scarboro and the first black inmate willing to play, "Granny" Granville, plus long-term prisoner Pop—and the warden's amorous secretary, Miss Toot—Crewe molds a team nicknamed the "Mean Machine". He agrees to play quarterback himself. After witnessing "Granny" being harassed by some of the prison guards without breaking, the black inmates decide to volunteer their services and join the team. Unger, one of the prison trustees, persistently asks Crewe if he can replace Caretaker as manager of the team, which Crewe refuses to do. In retaliation, Unger attempts to kill Crewe by fashioning a homemade bomb from a light bulb filled with a combustible fluid, designed to detonate inside Crewe's cell when he turns on the light. Caretaker is killed instead when he enters Crewe's cell to retrieve some papers; Unger locks the cell door, preventing rescue. Hazen sternly lectures Crewe's teammates about the consequences of any attempted escape after the game. Afterward, Crewe re-energizes the team with a surprise—presenting them with professional uniforms (stolen from the guards by Caretaker before he was killed). They charge onto the field in their new uniforms, angering the guards and Hazen.

The "Mean Machine" starts out well, and at halftime the game is close: the guards lead 15–13. Hazen threatens Crewe as an accessory to Caretaker's murder unless Crewe loses the game to the guards by at least 21 points. Crewe reluctantly agrees, but only if Hazen promises not to hurt the other prisoners; Hazen agrees "once we have the 21 points", but he betrays him by telling Knauer to have his team "inflict as much physical punishment on the prisoners as humanly possible" as soon as they are ahead by 21 points. Knauer, certain that the guards would win, reluctantly complies. Crewe makes deliberate mistakes, putting the "Mean Machine" down by more than three touchdowns, 35–13, then takes himself out of the game. The guards gladly injure several of the prisoners, and Crewe's teammates feel betrayed.

Depressed, Crewe asks Pop if it was worth punching Hazen (who was a guard when Pop was younger) and spending 30 years in prison; he says: "Yeah. For me it was". This rejuvenates Crewe. He goes back into the game, but the prisoners refuse to cooperate with him until he convinces them of his change of heart. The "Mean Machine" gets back into the game, trailing 35–30, one of their touchdowns scored by Nate despite his bad knee, and he is immediately cut down and crippled by guard Bogdanski. As he is wheeled off the field, Nate tells Crewe to "screw Hazen" and win the game. Crewe takes Bogdanski out of the game by twice throwing the ball with full force into Bogdanski's genital area. Crewe scores the winning touchdown with no time left and the "Mean Machine" wins, 36–35.

As the prisoners celebrate, Crewe walks across the field towards the departing crowds. Hazen repeatedly orders Knauer to shoot him ostensibly because he thinks Crewe is trying to escape but also because he is furious at Crewe's defiance. Knauer hesitates due to his newfound respect for Crewe, who is actually retrieving a football. Disgusted at what he almost did, Knauer hands the rifle back to Hazen saying, "Game ball." Crewe returns to the crestfallen Hazen with the ball telling him, "Stick this in your trophy case." Crewe walks into the stadium tunnel with Pop who says "I knew you could do it!"

== Cast ==
- Burt Reynolds as Paul "Wrecking" Crewe
- Eddie Albert as Warden Rudolph Hazen
- Ed Lauter as Captain Wilhelm Knauer
- Michael Conrad as Nate Scarboro
- Jim Hampton as James "Caretaker" Farrell
- Harry Caesar as "Granny" Granville
- John Steadman as "Pop"
- Charles Tyner as Unger
- Mike Henry as Lieutenant Rasmussen
- Jim Nicholson as "Ice Man"
- Bernadette Peters as Miss Toot
- Pervis Atkins as Mawabe
- Tony Cacciotti as Rotka
- Anitra Ford as Melissa
- Michael Fox as Announcer
- Joe Kapp as Walking Boss
- Dick Kiel as George Samson
- Pepper Martin as Shop Steward
- Mort Marshall as Assistant Warden
- Ray Nitschke as Bogdanski
- Tony Reese as Levitt
- Sonny Sixkiller as Indian
- Bob Tessier as Connie Shokner
- Dino Washington as Mason
- Ernie Wheelwright as Spooner
- George Jones as George "Big George"
- Ray Ogden as Schmidt
- Sonny Shroyer as Sonny Tannen

== Production ==
=== Writing ===
Producer Albert S. Ruddy wrote the story in the late 1960s. He got Tracy Keenan Wynn, who had written a television film about life in prison, The Glass House (1972), to write a script. Wynn signed in June 1972. Financing was raised through Paramount, which had released Ruddy's The Godfather. Director Robert Aldrich says he took the third act of the film—in which the main character Paul Crewe falls from grace and tries to redeem himself—from Body and Soul (1947), a film on which Aldrich had worked as assistant director. Aldrich used a similar device on All the Marbles (1981).

Though the film was billed as being based on an original story, some reviewers found parallels between this film and the 1962 Hungarian film Two Half Times in Hell, which was based on a real-life association football game in 1942 between German soldiers and Ukrainian prisoners of war during World War II, known as the Death Match. The character of Paul "Wrecking" Crewe was also said to have been inspired by former college basketball and NBA All-Star player Jack Molinas, who was said to have shaved points for Columbia University during the 1951 college basketball point-shaving scandal period and for the Fort Wayne Pistons during his sole season in the NBA, as well as being a key figure in the 1961 NCAA University Division men's basketball gambling scandal.

=== Casting ===
A number of the actors had previously played professional football. Mike Henry played for the Pittsburgh Steelers and the Los Angeles Rams. Joe Kapp played quarterback for the Minnesota Vikings and Boston Patriots and in the Canadian Football League (1959–1966). Ray Nitschke was a middle linebacker for the Green Bay Packers who was inducted into the Pro Football Hall of Fame in 1978, four years after release, and Pervis Atkins played for the Los Angeles Rams, the Washington Redskins and the Oakland Raiders. Also appearing as prisoners are Ernie Wheelwright, who played with the New York Giants, Atlanta Falcons and the New Orleans Saints, and Ray Ogden, who played with the St. Louis Cardinals, the New Orleans Saints, the Atlanta Falcons and the Chicago Bears. Sonny Sixkiller was a collegiate star as a quarterback for the University of Washington Huskies from 1970 to 1972, and briefly played pro in the defunct World Football League. Burt Reynolds himself had played college football for Florida State University before injuries curtailed his career. There were a number of convicts used as players during filming.

=== Filming ===
The film was shot on location at Georgia State Prison in Reidsville, Georgia. The production had the cooperation of then-Governor Jimmy Carter. Filming had to be delayed from time to time due to prison uprisings. There is now a museum that can be visited by appointment about the film and capital punishment in Georgia located in the prison's former Death Row.

According to Reynolds, Aldrich knew comedy was "not his strong suit" so they would do a take as written then he would ask for a "schtick take" where Reynolds could "clown around". Reynolds said the completed film used the schtick scenes about "65% of the time".

Of Reynolds, Aldrich said "on occasion he's a much better actor than he's given credit for. Not always: sometimes he acts like a caricature of himself. I thought he was very good in Longest Yard."

== Release ==
The Longest Yard opened in New York on August 21, 1974. This was followed by a release in Los Angeles on September 25, 1974, followed by a general release in October 1974.

The film earned $22 million in North American theatrical rentals. It had admissions in France of 200,738.

== Reception ==
The film holds a 74% rating on Rotten Tomatoes based on 39 reviews. The critical consensus reads: "Equal parts tough and funny, and led by a perfectly cast Burt Reynolds, The Longest Yard has an interesting political subtext and an excellent climax – even if it takes too long to get there." Metacritic, which uses a weighted average, assigned the film a score of 61 out of 100, based on 7 critics, indicating "generally favorable" reviews.

Nora Sayre of The New York Times called the film "a terrible picture" with prison guards that "behave like leering sci-fi monsters" and Reynolds doing a "lumbering imitation" of Marlon Brando in On the Waterfront. Arthur D. Murphy of Variety declared it "an outstanding action drama, combining the brutish excitement of football competition with the brutalities of contemporary prison life. Burt Reynolds again asserts his genuine star power, here as a former football pro forced to field a team under blackmail of warden Eddie Albert." Pauline Kael of The New Yorker wrote that Reynolds was "perfect in this brutal comic fantasy about a football game between crazily ruthless convicts and crazily ruthless guards; for all its bone-crunching collisions, the picture is almost irresistibly good-natured and funny." Gene Siskel of the Chicago Tribune gave the film three stars out of four and wrote that director Robert Aldrich "is effective in portraying black inmates as a world apart in the prison system; it's the one realistic element in this old-fashioned and brutal drama." Charles Champlin of the Los Angeles Times stated, "The story is both clever and unsubtle, the action riot-gun fast from start to satisfying finish, the characters vivid and boldly drawn, the jokes set up and paid off with old-pro efficiency: the bone-snapping, billy-club violence (of which there is inevitably a fair amount) is by Aldrich's standards restrained and by any standards allowable." Tom Shales of The Washington Post wrote, "It might seem morally imperative at this point to condemn with indignation what this movie is trying to do—stir up gut-level reactions at a mob-baiting level. And yet, however one may feel about that goal, it would be hard to deny that the movie achieves it."

MAD satirized this movie as "The Longest Yardbird" in issue #176 (July 1975).

== Awards and nominations ==
Award	Category	Nominee(s)	Result
Academy Awards	Best Film Editing	Michael Luciano	Nominated
American Cinema Editors Awards	Best Edited Feature Film	Michael Luciano	Won
Golden Globe Awards	Best Motion Picture – Musical or Comedy	Robert Aldrich and Albert S. Ruddy	Won
Golden Globe Awards	Best Actor in a Motion Picture – Musical or Comedy	Burt Reynolds	Nominated
Golden Globe Awards	Best Supporting Actor – Motion Picture	Eddie Albert	Nominated
Golden Globe Awards	Most Promising Newcomer – Male	James Hampton	Nominated

== Remakes ==
The film has been remade three times:

- Mean Machine (2001 film), starring Vinnie Jones, taking place in England and changing the sport from American football to Association football.
- The Longest Yard (2005), starring Adam Sandler as Crewe and featuring Burt Reynolds in a supporting role (that of retired player Nate Scarborough).
- Captain Masr, which translates to Egypt's Captain (2015 film), starring Mohamed Imam, taking place in Egypt and again changing the sport to Association football.

== See also ==
- List of American films of 1974
- List of American football films
