= List of newspaper columnists =

This is a list of notable newspaper columnists. It does not include magazine or electronic columnists.

== English-language ==
=== Australia ===
- Phillip Adams (born 1939), The Australian
- Piers Akerman (born 1950), The Daily Telegraph
- Janet Albrechtsen (born 1966), The Australian
- Andrew Bolt (born 1959), Herald Sun, Melbourne
- Leslie Cannold (born 1965), The Age Melbourne; The Sun Herald | Sydney; Crikey
- Mike Carlton (born 1946), The Sydney Morning Herald
- Nick Cater, The Australian
- Peta Credlin (born 1971), The Australian
- Henry Ergas, The Australian
- Elizabeth Farrelly, The Sydney Morning Herald
- Nikki Gemmell (born 1966), The Australian
- Robert Gottliebsen (born 1941), The Australian
- Sarah Holland-Batt (born 1982), The Australian
- Danny Katz (born 1960s), The Age Melbourne; The Sydney Morning Herald; The West Australian
- Gavin King (born 1979), The Cairns Post
- Bjørn Lomborg (born 1965), The Australian
- Brendan O'Neill, The Australian
- Bernard Salt, The Australian
- Niki Savva, The Age; The Sydney Morning Herald
- Judith Sloan (born 1954), The Australian

=== Bangladesh ===
- Natyaguru Nurul Momen (1908 - 1990), The Bangladesh Observer, The Bangladesh Times, Morning News, The Pakistan Observer

=== Canada ===
==== Living ====
- Barbara Amiel (born 1940), Toronto Sun, The Times, The Sunday Times, The Daily Telegraph
- Andrew Coyne (born 1960), Financial Post, National Post, The Globe and Mail, CanWest News Service
- John Doyle (born 1957), The Globe and Mail
- Gwynne Dyer (born 1943), self-syndicated
- David Frum (born 1960), National Post
- Robert Fulford (born 1932), National Post
- Marcus Gee The Globe and Mail
- Chantal Hébert (born 1954), Toronto Star
- Michele Landsberg (born 1935), Toronto Star
- Heather Mallick (born 1959), Toronto Sun, Toronto Star, The Globe and Mail
- Lawrence Martin (born 1948), The Globe and Mail
- Don Macpherson (1947), Montreal Gazette
- Doug Saunders (born 1967), The Globe and Mail
- Jeffrey Simpson (born 1949), The Globe and Mail
- Mark Steyn (born 1959), The Spectator, The Daily Telegraph
- Ellie Tesher (born 1941), Toronto Star, Chicago Sun-Times
- Margaret Wente (born 1950), The Globe and Mail

==== Deceased ====
- Christie Blatchford (1951–2020), National Post
- Milt Dunnell (1905–2008), Toronto Star
- Allan Fotheringham (1932–2020), The Globe and Mail, National Post, The Roughneck, Maclean's
- Rex Murphy (1947–2024), The Globe and Mail, National Post
- Geoffrey Stevens (1940–2023), The Globe and Mail, Waterloo Region Record
- Peter Worthington (1927–2013), Toronto Telegram, Toronto Sun

=== Dominican Republic ===
- Geovanny Vicente (1986–), CNN, Infobae

=== France ===
- William Pfaff (1928–2015), International Herald Tribune

=== Ghana ===
- Cameron Duodu (1937–), Mail and Guardian, City Press (South Africa), Ghanaian Times
- Anis Haffar, Daily Graphic

=== India ===
- Bachi Karkaria
- Chetan Bhagat
- Swaminathan Aiyar
- Chidanand Rajghatta
- Gurcharan Das
- Harish Iyer
- Jug Suraiya
- Kaberi Gayen (1970–), The Daily Star, Prothom Alo
- M. J. Akbar
- Mrinal Chatterjee
- Rafiq Zakaria (1920–2005), The Times of India
- Rajdeep Sardesai
- Shobhaa De
- Soli Sorabjee
- Sunita Narain
- Swapan Dasgupta
- Tavleen Singh (1950–), The Indian Express

=== Ireland ===
- Eamon Delaney

=== Israel ===
- Dan Margalit (1938–), Haaretz

=== Pakistan ===
- Hassan Nisar, Daily Jang
- Saleem Safi, Daily Jang
- Irfan Husain, Daily Dunya
- Hamid Mir, Daily Jang
- Rauf Klasra, Daily Dunya
- Khurshid Ahmed Nadeem, Daily Duniya

=== Philippines ===
- Randy David (19??–), Philippine Daily Inquirer

=== Saint Vincent and the Grenadines ===
- Kenneth John (1938–2021), The Vincentian

=== South Africa ===
- Jani Allan (1953–), Sunday Times
- W.O. Kühne (Wilhelm Otto Kühne, 1924–1988) Die Burger

=== Trinidad and Tobago ===
- Marion O'Callaghan (1934–2016), Trinidad and Tobago Newsday
- Raoul Pantin (1943–2015), Trinidad Express
- Marina Salandy-Brown, Trinidad and Tobago Newsday

=== United Kingdom ===
- Barbara Amiel (1940–), Toronto Sun, The Times, Sunday Times, Daily Telegraph
- Bruce Anderson, The Independent
- Terence Blacker (1948–), The Independent
- Russell Brand (1975–), The Guardian
- Jeremy Clarkson (1960–), The Sunday Times and The Sun
- Robert Crampton (1964–), The Times
- Nigel Dempster (1941–2007), Daily Express, Daily Mail and Private Eye
- Tom Driberg (1905–1976), Daily Express and Reynolds News
- Tony Forrester (1953–), The Daily Telegraph and The Sunday Telegraph
- Jonathan Freedland (1967–), The Guardian, Jewish Chronicle, Daily Mirror, Evening Standard
- A. A. Gill (1954–2016), The Sunday Times
- Simon Heffer (1960–), Daily Mail, The Daily Telegraph
- Peter Hitchens (1951–), Daily Express, The Mail on Sunday
- Simon Jenkins (1943–), The Sunday Times, The Guardian, Evening Standard
- Bernard Levin (1928–2004), The Times
- Richard Littlejohn (1954–), The Sun and Daily Mail
- George Monbiot (1963–), The Guardian
- Matthew Parris (1949–), The Times
- Melanie Reid (2010–), The Times
- Frances Ryan (2011–), The Guardian
- David Rennie (1971–), Evening Standard, The Daily Telegraph, The Economist
- Joan Smith (1953–), The Independent on Sunday, The Guardian, The Telegraph
- Mark Steel (1960–), The Guardian, The Independent
- Jack Trevor Story (1917–1991), The Guardian
- Andrew Sullivan (1963–), The Sunday Times
- Tom Townsend (1971–), The Daily Telegraph
- Polly Toynbee (1946–), The Guardian, The Independent,
- Hugo Young (1937–2003), The Guardian, The Sunday Times

=== United States ===
==== A–L ====
- Mitch Albom (1958–), Detroit Free Press
- Mike Barnicle (1943–), Boston Herald
- Dave Barry (1947–), Miami Herald
- David Bianculli (19??–), Philadelphia Inquirer, New York Post, New York Daily News
- David Brooks (1961–), The New York Times
- Rosa Brooks (1970–), Los Angeles Times
- Pat Buchanan (1938–), Creators Syndicate
- Scott Burns, Universal Press Syndicate and Dallas Morning News
- Wilson Casey (1954–), Spartanburg, South Carolina Herald-Journal, King Features Weekly Syndicate
- Mona Charen (1957–), Creators Syndicate
- Richard Cohen, The Washington Post
- Gail Collins (1945–), The New York Times
- Ann Coulter (1961–), Universal Press Syndicate
- E. J. Dionne (1952–), The Washington Post
- Maureen Dowd (1952–), The New York Times
- Mike Downey (1951–), Los Angeles Times, Chicago Tribune
- Tina Dupuy (1978–), Cagle Cartoons
- Mike Freeman, The Indianapolis Star
- Thomas Friedman (1953–), The New York Times
- Jonah Goldberg (1969–), USA Today, Los Angeles Times, Tribune Media Services
- Ray Hanania (1953–), Daily Southtown, Chicago Sun-Times, Southwest News Newspaper Group, Arab News, The Jerusalem Post
- Victor Davis Hanson (1953–), Tribune Media Services
- Froma Harrop (1950–), Creators Syndicate
- Carolyn Hax (1966–), The Washington Post
- Carl Hiaasen (1943–), Miami Herald
- Jeff Jacoby (1969–), Boston Globe
- Avery Yale Kamila (197?–), Portland Press Herald
- Kelly Kazek (1965-), AL.com
- Michael Kinsley (1951–), The Washington Post
- Nicholas Kristof (1959–), The New York Times
- Paul Krugman (1953–), The New York Times
- Al Lewis (1961–), Dow Jones Newswires
- Steve Lopez (1953–), Los Angeles Times

==== M–Z ====
- Charlie Madigan (1949–), Chicago Tribune
- Michelle Malkin (1970–), Los Angeles Daily News, Seattle Times, St. Louis Globe-Democrat, Creators Syndicate
- Ray Marcano "Dayton Daily News," "Columbus Dispatch"
- Tom Meek (1956–), Gainesville Sun
- Harold Meyerson (1950–), The Washington Post
- Jeffrey Morgan (19??–), Metro Times
- Patt Morrison, Los Angeles Times
- Clarence Page (1947–), Chicago Tribune
- Kathleen Parker (1952–), The Washington Post Writers Group
- Jeanne Phillips (Abigail van Buren or Dear Abby), (1942–), Universal Press Syndicate
- Leonard Pitts (1957–), Miami Herald
- Bill Plaschke (1958–), Los Angeles Times
- Dennis Prager (1948–), Creators Syndicate
- Ted Rall (1963–), San Francisco Chronicle Features, Universal Press Syndicate
- Michael Reagan (1945–), Cagle Cartoons
- Eugene Robinson (1954–), The Washington Post
- Neal Rubin (1955–), Detroit News
- Mary Schmich (1953–), Chicago Tribune
- Ben Shapiro (1984–), Patriot Post
- Kyle Smith (critic) (1966–), New York Post
- Thomas Sowell (1930–), Creators Syndicate
- Stephen Stromberg (1983–), The Washington Post
- Ellie Tesher (1941–), Toronto Star
- Cal Thomas (1942–), Tribune Media Services
- Peter Vecsey (1943–), New York Post
- Gene Weingarten (1951–), The Washington Post
- George Will (1941–), The Washington Post Writers Group
- Walter E. Williams (1936–2020), Creators Syndicate
- Craig Wilson, Saratogian, USA Today

==== Deceased ====
Listed chronologically by birth date

- John Neal (1793–1876), The Baltimore Telegraph
- Fanny Fern (1811–1872), New York Ledger
- Charlotte Reeve Conover (1855–1940), Dayton Daily News
- Harry Carr (1877–1936), Los Angeles Times
- Will Rogers (1879–1935), The New York Times, McNaught Syndicate
- E.V. Durling (1893–1957), King Features Syndicate
- O. O. McIntyre (1884–1938), Gallipolis Tribune, Bridgeport Post, New York Journal-American, Scripps-Howard, McNaught
- Lee Shippey (1884–1969), Kansas City Star, Los Angeles Times, San Diego Union, Del Mar Surfcomber
- Hedda Hopper (1885–1966), Los Angeles Times, Syndicated Columnist
- Walter Winchell (1897–1972), Vaudeville News, New York Evening Graphic, New York Daily Mirror
- Drew Pearson (1897–1969), The Washington Post
- Ward Morehouse (1899–1967), New York Sun
- Ed Sullivan (1901–1974), New York Evening Graphic, New York Daily News
- Lucius Beebe (1902–1966), San Francisco Examiner, New York Herald Tribune
- Matt Weinstock (1903–1970), Los Angeles Daily News, Los Angeles Times
- C.H. Garrigues (1903–1974), Los Angeles Illustrated Daily News, San Francisco Examiner
- Red Smith (1905–82), The New York Times
- Ruth Montgomery (1912–2001), Hearst Headline Service, United Press International
- Irv Kupcinet (1912–2003), Chicago Sun-Times
- Roz Young (1912–2005), Dayton Daily News
- Dorothy Kilgallen (1913–1965), New York Journal-American
- Marj Heyduck (1913–1969), Dayton Daily News
- Celestine Sibley (1914–1999), Atlanta Constitution
- Charles McCabe (1915–1983), San Francisco Chronicle
- Parke S. Rouse Jr. (1915–1997), Newport News, Daily Press
- Herb Caen (1916–1997), San Francisco Chronicle
- Sydney J. Harris (1917–1986), Chicago Daily News, Chicago Sun-Times
- Tom Braden (1917–2007)
- Sylvia Schur (1917–2009), PM
- Emmett Watson (1918–2001), Seattle Times, Seattle Post-Intelligencer
- Eppie Lederer (Ann Landers), (1918–2002), Chicago Sun-Times
- Pauline Phillips (Abigail van Buren or Dear Abby) (1918–2013), San Francisco Chronicle, McNaught Syndicate, Universal Press Syndicate
- Jim Murray (1919–1998), Los Angeles Times
- Andy Rooney (1919–2011), Tribune Media Services
- James Jackson Kilpatrick, (1920–2010), journalist, columnist, author, writer and grammarian
- Dick Kleiner (1921–2002), Newspaper Enterprise Association
- Army Archerd (1922–2009), Daily Variety
- Jack Anderson (1922–2005), Syndicated Columnist
- Al Neuharth (1924–2013), USA Today
- Art Buchwald (1925–2007), The Washington Post, International Herald-Tribune, Tribune Media Services
- Russell Baker (1925–2018), The New York Times
- Erma Bombeck (1927–1996), Dayton Journal Herald, Kettering-Oakwood Times, Newsday Newspaper Syndicate
- L. M. Boyd (1927–2007), Seattle Post-Intelligencer, San Francisco Chronicle, Crown Syndicate
- James Brady (1928–2009), New York Post, Advertising Age, Crain's New York Business
- Jimmy Breslin (1928–2017), New York Daily News, Long Island Newsday
- Herbert Lyle Mayfield (1929–2012), Greenville Advocate
- William Safire (1929–2009), The New York Times
- Robert Novak (1931–2009), "Inside Report", Chicago Sun-Times
- Mike Royko (1932–1997), Chicago Daily News, Chicago Sun-Times, Chicago Tribune
- Hunter S. Thompson (1937–2005), The Playground News, San Francisco Examiner, Rolling Stone
- Roger Ebert (1942–2013), Chicago Sun-Times
- Molly Ivins (1944–2007), Dallas Times-Herald, Fort Worth Star-Telegram, The New York Times, Creators Syndicate
- Lewis Grizzard (1946–1994), Atlanta Journal-Constitution
- Charles Krauthammer (1950–2018), The Washington Post
- Mike McAlary (1957–1998), New York Daily News

=== Zimbabwe ===
- Kudzai Mutisi, NewsDay Zimbabwe, The Standard Zimbabwe
- Eddie Cross, NewsDay Zimbabwe, The Standard Zimbabwe, Bulawayo24 News, The Chronicle Zimbabwe

== French-language ==
=== France ===
- Raymond Aron (1905–1983), Le Figaro, L'Express
- Alain Rémond (1946–), Télérama, Marianne, La Croix

== Italian-language ==
=== Italy ===
- Lucia Annunziata (1950–), La Stampa
- Fiamma Nirenstein (1945–), Il Giornale
- Anna Maria Quaini or Mina Mazzini (1940–), La Stampa
- Beppe Severgnini (1956–), Corriere della Sera
- Marco Travaglio (1964–), La Republica, L'Unita, L'Espresso

== Japanese-language ==
=== Japan ===
- Debito Arudou (1965–), Japan Times and Japan Today
- Hugh Cortazzi (1924–2018), Japan Times

== Polish-language ==
=== Poland ===
- Bolesław Prus (1847–1912), free-lance

== Portuguese-language ==
=== Brazil ===
- Luis Fernando Verissimo (1936–), A ilusao
- Arnaldo Jabor (1940–2022), Pensador

=== Portugal ===
- Miguel Sousa Tavares (1952–), Expresso
- Ricardo de Araújo Pereira (1974–), Visão

== Spanish-language ==
=== Argentina ===
- María Elena Oddone, El Informador Público
- Susana Viau (1944–2013), Clarín, Estamos como queremos

=== Bolivia ===
- Centa Rek (born 1954)
- Elizabeth Salguero (born 1964), Página Siete, La Razón, the Bolpress News Agency, and the Women's Alternative Communication Network

=== Chile ===
- Teresa Marinovic (born 1973) El Mostrador, Las Últimas Noticias
- Patricia May, El Sábado and El Mercurio

=== Colombia ===
- Claudia López Hernández (born 1970), El Tiempo
- Maria del Pilar Ortiz, 7 Dias

=== Ecuador ===
- Pamela Aguirre Zambonino (born 1984), Diario La Verdad
- Cecilia Ansaldo (born 1949), El Universo

=== Guatemala ===
- Carol Zardetto, Magazine XX

=== Honduras ===
- Mary Elizabeth Flores (born 1973)
- Mimí Panayotti (1983–2023), La Prensa

=== Mexico ===
- Carmen Aristegui (born 1964), Reforma
- Amalia González Caballero de Castillo Ledón (1898–1996), Excelsior
- Denise Dresser (born 1963), Proceso
- Ilana Sod (born 1973), Excélsior

=== Panama ===
- Gloria Guardia (1940–2019), La Prensa, Panama America, and Cambio

=== Peru ===
- Alex Kuczynski (born 1970), The New York Times
- Vicky Peláez (born 1956), The Moscow News
- Mirtha Vásquez (born 1975), Noticias SER
- Gabriela Wiener (born 1975), La República

=== Spain ===
- Begoña Ameztoy (born 1951), El Diario Vasco
- Carmen Camacho (writer) (born 1976), Diario de Sevilla
- Natividad Cepeda (born 1949), Castilla La Mancha press (Lanza, Las Provincias, El periódico común de la Mancha, La tribuna, Pasos); literary magazines (El cardo de bronze, La Alcazaba)
- María de Echarri (born 1878–1955)
- Laura Freixas (born 1958), La Vanguardia
- Chelo García-Cortés (born 1951), gossip columnist
- Begoña Huertas (1965–2022), ElDiario.es
- Aurora Luque (born 1962), Diario Sur
- Nativel Preciado (born 1948), opinion columnist
- Isabel San Sebastián (born 1959), El contrapunto
- Mila Ximénez (1952–2021), gossip columnist

=== Venezuela ===
- Ivonne Attas (1943–), Gentiuno, Opinión y Noticias

== See also ==
- List of syndicated columnists
