= List of syndicated columnists =

This list of syndicated columnists comprises columnists whose recurring columns are published in multiple periodical publications (e.g., newspapers and magazines).

- Ghaith Abdul-Ahad
- Mitch Albom (Tuesdays with Mitch)
- Yasmin Alibhai-Brown
- Timothy Garton Ash
- Dave Barry
- Lucius Beebe
- Max Boot
- David Brooks
- Rosa Brooks
- Art Buchwald
- Wilson Casey
- Jonathan Chait
- Noam Chomsky
- Alexander Cockburn
- Andrew Cockburn
- Patrick Cockburn
- Ann Coulter
- S. E. Cupp
- Amy Dickinson (Ask Amy)
- Maureen Dowd
- Peter Economy
- Susan Estrich
- Niall Ferguson
- Robert Fisk
- Grace Beacham Freeman
- Thomas Friedman
- David Frum
- Francis Fukuyama
- Nathan Gardels (Global Viewpoint Network)
- Issamar Ginzberg
- Jonah Goldberg
- Stuart Goldman
- Josh B. Hammer
- Victor Davis Hanson
- Froma Harrop
- Amira Hass
- Nat Hentoff
- Seymour Hersh
- Carl Hiaasen
- Dilip Hiro
- Peter Hitchens
- Molly Ivins
- Rev. Jesse Jackson
- Paul Johnson
- John Kass
- Garrison Keillor
- Kitty Kelley
- Paul Kennedy
- Naomi Klein
- Dave Kopel
- Markos Kounalakis
- Charles Krauthammer
- Paul Krugman
- Christina Lamb
- Rich Lowry
- Michelle Malkin
- Rachel Marsden
- Luis Martínez-Fernández
- George Monbiot
- Oliver North
- Andrés Oppenheimer (The Oppenheimer Report)
- Bill O'Reilly
- Clarence Page
- Greg Palast
- Kathleen Parker
- Jeanne Phillips (Dear Abby)
- Melanie Phillips
- John Pilger
- Daniel Pipes
- Leonard Pitts Jr.
- Katha Pollitt
- Dennis Prager
- Bill Press
- Wolfgang Puck (Wolfgang Puck’s Kitchen)
- Anna Quindlen
- Ted Rall
- Robert Reich
- Salman Rushdie
- Debra Saunders
- Jeraldine Saunders (Omarr’s Astrological Forecast)
- Dan Savage
- Jeffrey L. Seglin
- Mildred Seydell
- Mary Schmich
- Ben Shapiro
- Mark Shields
- Thomas Sowell
- Rick Steves (Rick Steves’ Europe)
- Mark Steyn
- John Stossel
- Rawson Stovall
- Andrew Sullivan
- Cal Thomas
- Jennifer Vanasco
- Ana Veciana-Suarez
- Geovanny Vicente (CNN, Americas Quarterly, among others)
- George Will
- Walter Williams
- Jules Witcover (Politics Today)
- Bob Woodward
- Andy Xie
- Phyllis Zagano
- Fareed Zakaria

== See also ==
- Advice column
- Editorial
- Food column
