= Ellie Tesher =

Canadian journalist

- Born: 1941 (age 84–85); Toronto, Ontario, Canada
- Education: University of Toronto
- Occupations: journalist, advice columnist
- Known for: syndicated columnist

Ellie Tesher (born 1941) is a Canadian journalist and advice columnist.

== Biography ==
Born in Toronto, Ontario, Tesher studied sociology at the University of Toronto. She then worked for the Children's Aid Society in Toronto as a caseworker. In 1974, while studying toward a master's degree in sociology, Tesher began working as a freelance journalist. In 1977, she was hired by the Toronto Star. She has held a variety of positions with the Star, both as a writer and an editor.

In September, 2002, following the death of Ann Landers, Tesher debuted as the Star's new advice columnist. Her column has now been syndicated to 31 newspapers in both Canada and the United States, including the Chicago Sun-Times and most of Osprey Media's Ontario dailies.

With her daughter Lisi Tesher -also an advice columnist- she briefly hosted a Sunday evening talk radio advice show on CFRB radio in 2005. However, the show was canceled at the end of that year.

In 2006/2007, she was the host of the reality show "Outlaw Inlaws" on Slice (formerly Life). The show was picked up for a second season.

== See also ==
- List of newspaper columnists
