= Maria del Pilar Ortiz =

Colombian journalist

- Born: Colombia
- Occupation: Journalist

María del Pilar Ortiz is a Colombian journalist.

She is most recognized as the former director and anchorwoman of Noticias Univision in Tampa, Florida; a position she maintained for eleven years. In addition to Univision, she has worked as a reporter for RCN TV, Caracol TV, and CBS TeleNoticias. She has interviewed multiple politicians and celebrities including Barack Obama, John McCain, Andrés Pastrana, Hugo Chávez, Shakira, Carlos Vives, Celia Cruz, Tito Nieves, Ricardo Arjona, and Ricky Martin. In 1997, while working at Caracol TV she received the Simon Bolivar National Journalism Award in the category of "Best Television Chronicle of the Year".

Today, Maria del Pilar Ortiz serves as a consultant for La Guia Magazine. She is also a columnist for the weekly newspaper 7 Dias along with Jorge Ramos.

October 4, 2014 was declared "Maria del Pilar Ortiz Hispanic Woman of the Year Day" by Mayor of Tampa Bob Buckhorn, when Tampa Hispanic Heritage, Inc. named her Hispanic Woman of the Year.
