= Guitalin =

North American folk instrument

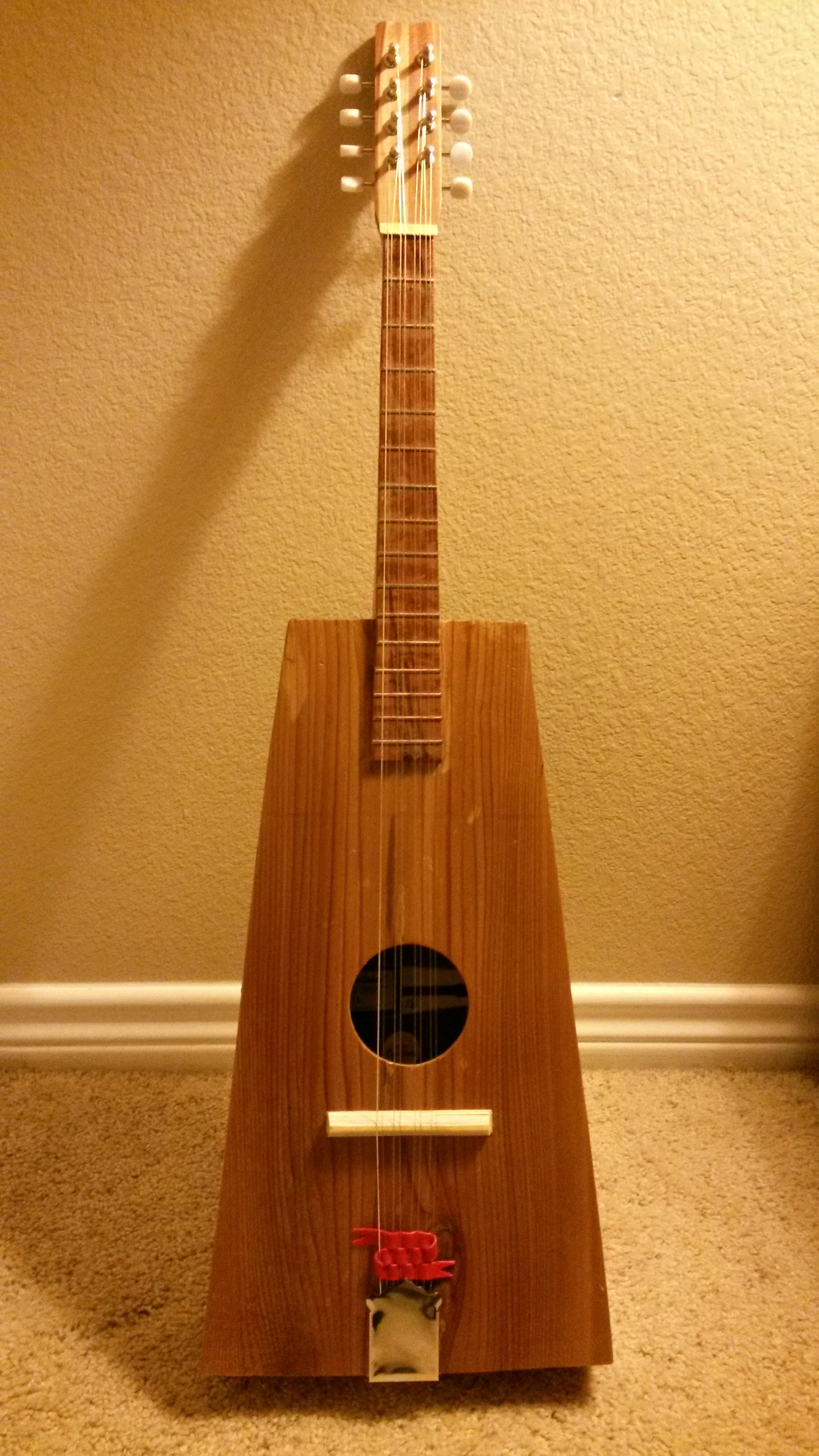
- A Mayfield guitalin, #LMN-1, January 2013. Blue Spruce top.

String instrument
- Classification: String instrument Plucked string instrument
- Hornbostel–Sachs classification: 321.321-6 (Composite chordophone sounded by a plectrum)
- Developed: Mid to late 20th century

Playing range
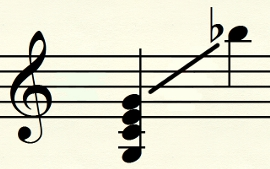

"Wildwood Flower" played on a guitalin
Finger picking style

Hammer on style playing
Finger picking – hammer on style

A guitalin (/ɡɪdʌlɪn/) is a Northern American folk instrument that is a part of the lute family, having four courses of strings. Its fourth course is tuned to an octave while the remaining courses are tuned in unisons. The instrument can be either finger picked or plucked with a plectrum. It was invented in October 1962 by Lyle Mayfield of Greenville, Illinois. The guitalin is a non-traditional, hybrid folk instrument, as it incorporates features of multiple traditional folk instruments into one. While the original tuning consisted of a G chord in root position, the standard tuning of the guitalin which was adopted is a C chord in second inversion. Another common tuning is a second inversion G chord.

The timbre or tone quality of the guitalin can be described as a combination between a banjo and a mandolin, while the name of the instrument is derived from the combination of the names of the guitar and mandolin. The shape of the body of the instrument is an elongated trapezoid about the length of a standard guitar body.

From the time it was invented until Mayfield's death in 2012, there was much experimentation with several configurations of instruments based on the guitalin and guinjo (another of Mayfield's inventions). Among these experiments were the fretted fiddle or "friddle" or "guiddle", an 8-string fiddle, the dobrolin, the triplin (an instrument Mayfield disliked, recorded once, then scrapped), an electric (solid body) guitalin, and even a full-sized, upright guitalin bass. Other notable Mayfield instruments include the guinjo (1974), a bass mandolin (1974), the Coffee Can Lid Banjo (1974), a Commodophone (a spoof instrument using a toilet seat for a top), the Echo Guitar (1992), the Mayfield Guitar (1998), the Mariachi bass (1998), a variation on the hard-top banjo (2006), the Mayfield Pear Guitars (2005), a variation on the Manjo (2006), the Round Cornered Guitalin (Martin Smith, 2006), the Round Head Guitars (Martin Smith, 2007), and variations on the Mandola (2008) and the Dreadnought Guitar (2008).

== Tuning ==
There are several ways a guitalin is tuned. The most common tuning is a second inversion C chord with the courses of 2 adjacent strings tuned in unison with the lowest course (4th course) tuned an octave apart. This common tuning is GCEG.

- fourth course (lowest tone of 4th course): G3 (196.00 Hz), fourth course (highest tone of 4th course): G4 (392.00 Hz)
- third course: C4 (261.60 Hz)
- second course: E4 (329.60 Hz;)
- first course: G4 (392.00 Hz)

Secondary Tuning (original tuning):

- fourth course (lowest tone of 4th course): G3 (196.00 Hz), fourth course (highest tone of 4th course): G4 (392.00 Hz)
- third course: B3 (246.90 Hz)
- second course: D4 (293.70 Hz;)
- first course: G4 (392.00 Hz)

Other tunings used in recordings include a root position G chord, and root position F chord, and even the standard ukulele tuning of G-C-E-A.

== History ==
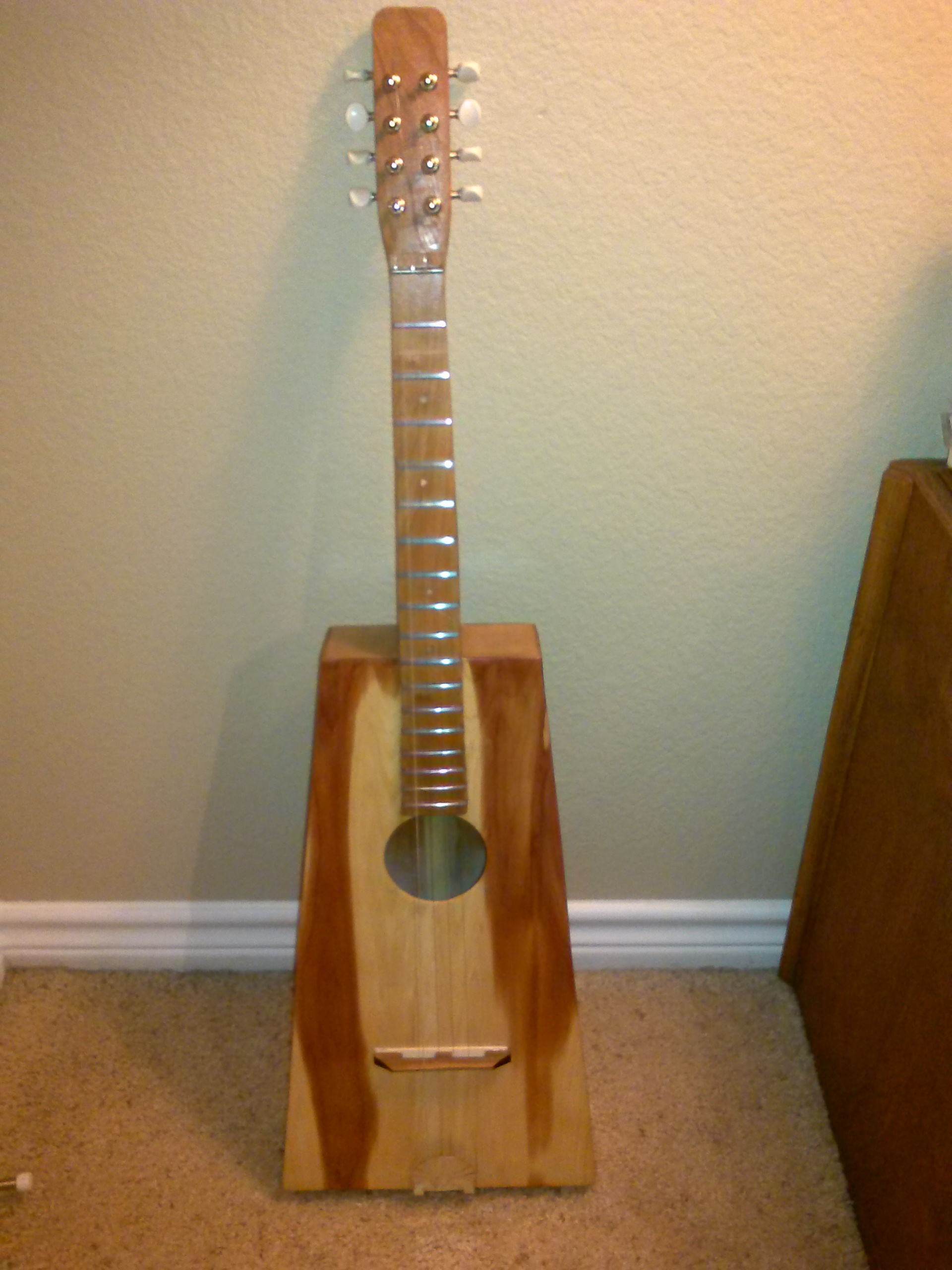
Guitalin #LMN-2, built July 2013 for Sufjan Stevens. American Red Cedar top.

The instrument was invented by Lyle Mayfield of Greenville, Illinois. It was originally conceived as a toy instrument in October 1962 for his 3-year-old son, Layne Mayfield, when he asked for a guitar to play. Lyle was known for designing and building hybrid folk instruments which combined two or three instrument features into a single instrument. In Lyle's personal writings discovered after his death, he describes the origins of the guitalin as follows:

"I decided to build a toy instrument for him to play with. In my workshop I had some 1/4” mahogany wall paneling, some banjo parts, some mandolin parts, and some pine wood from a packing crate. From these components I fashioned a simple instrument that was somewhat wedge-shaped. Using a mandolin set of machine heads and a mandolin bridge I strung it with four sets of duals over a guitar sized fingerboard. While building the instrument, I realized that if I just left it untuned my small son would be beating on a dischordant set of strings. I decided to tune it to an open chord...G."

Lyle goes on further to say in his writings that "when [he] tuned the instrument up the sound was so impressive [he] decided to keep it as a working instrument. It was at that time that Layne lost his instrument."

A few notable folk musicians have played the instrument and have found it noteworthy. Among these are Jimmy Driftwood (composer of "The Battle of New Orleans" and "Tennessee Stud"), Grammy Award winner Doc Watson and The Bray Brothers, who featured the Mayfield guitalin on their album "Prairie Bluegrass" on the tune "Barbara Allen" from the label Rounder Records, originally recorded in 1962 for WHOW radio in Clinton, Illinois. Recordings of these musicians playing or remarking on the instrument are available upon request from the family archives.

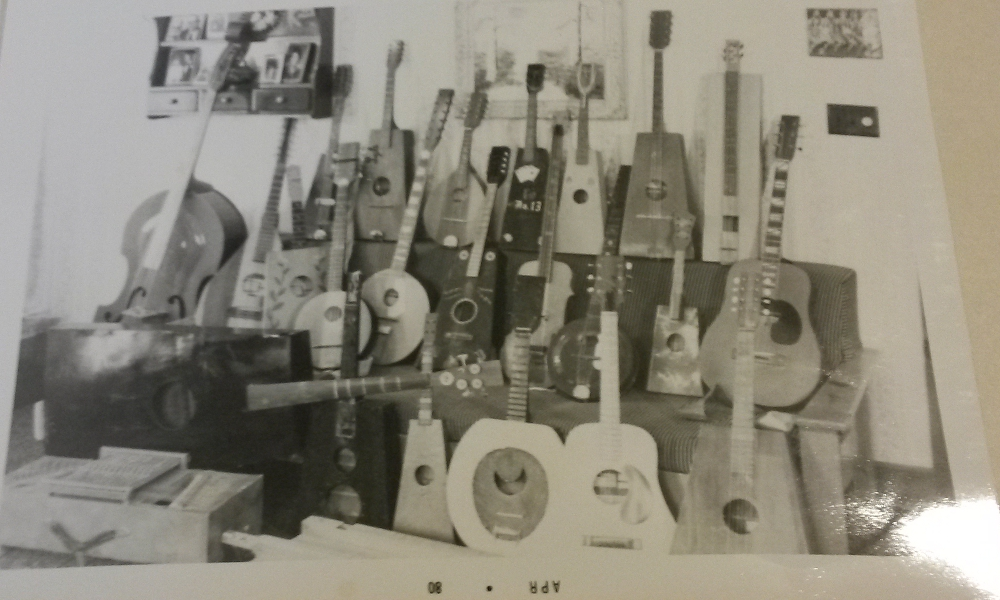
Collection of Mayfield instruments, April 1980

In the 1960s, Lyle and Doris Mayfield were involved in the University of Illinois at Urbana-Champaign Campus Folksong Club and were associated with Archie Green during that time. In the mid-1960s, Lyle was credited for bringing the native music of Illinois to the Campus Folksong Club and appeared on recordings that the club produced, including the "Green Fields of Illinois" record. He and Doris regularly appeared in performances held by the Folksong Club, commonly referred to as "folk sings". They also volunteered their time and talents to perform for other events and venues. In 1976, Lyle and Doris Mayfield, along with their son Layne, were invited by the Smithsonian Institution to represent Southern Illinois at the American Bicentennial Smithsonian Folklife Festival. It was at this event that they had a good opportunity to showcase some of their unique folk instruments; namely the guitalin and guinjo. Throughout most of the 1970s, the Mayfields devoted much time to preserving traditional southern Illinois music and folklore. Additionally, they were the founders and principle sponsors of the annual Southern Illinois Folk Convention in the early 1970s.

Mayfield Instruments is currently operated by Lyle's youngest grandson, Nathan Smith, who continues to produce them out of Dallas, Texas. Several guitalins and guinjos were produced between the years of 2005 and 2008 as a team effort between Lyle Mayfield and his then-apprentice Martin Smith (unrelated to Nathan Smith). Instruments produced during this 3 year window contain an internal badge which reads "LyMar - Instruments Built By Hand With Love".

== Modern use ==
In the summer of 2013, the instrument was discovered by indie folk musician Sufjan Stevens, who contacted Nathan Smith, Lyle's youngest grandson and current owner of Mayfield Instruments, to inquire about having one built. On March 31, 2015, Sufjan released the album Carrie & Lowell, which features Mayfield guitalin LMN-2. In April 2015, Sufjan began a tour for the album, with two Mayfield guitalins making an appearance. This marks the first use of a guitalin on a major record since 1964, when The Bray Brothers featured guitalin number 1 on the song "Barbara Allen", from their album "Prairie Bluegrass", released under Rounder Records (0053). On October 6th, 2023 Stevens released his album Javelin, which features Mayfield's first carbon fiber guitalin on the intro to the track "Will Anybody Ever Love Me", and guitalin LMN-2 on the Neil Young cover "There's A World", accompanied by ukulele. Other tracks by Stevens that utilize the guitalin are "Death with Dignity", "City of Roses", "Fireproof", and "Kiss of Niobe".
