= Matt Weinstock =

American newspaper editor

Matt Weinstock

Matt Weinstock (1903–1970) was a managing editor of the Los Angeles Illustrated Daily News and a columnist for three Los Angeles, California, newspapers for 33 years.

Weinstock, the son of Frank Weinstock, a clothing manufacturer, and Sarah Weinstock, was born in Pittsburgh, Pennsylvania, on February 12, 1903, and moved with his family to Los Angeles when he was eight years old. He graduated from Los Angeles High School in 1920, then spent three years at UCLA, where he was sports editor of the student newspaper, the California Grizzly. He left school in 1924 to become a sports reporter for the Daily News.

He was made managing editor of the newspaper in 1934 by publisher Manchester Boddy and took on the duty of writing a regular column three years later when E.V. Durling, the featured columnist for the newspaper, left for the Los Angeles Times. He recalled that "I couldn't find anyone" to replace Durling, "and in desperation I filled in as the columnist myself. . . . I had to make a choice. I chose the column job, rejecting that as managing editor. It seemed a stupid thing to do at the time, but it has proven very wise."

Weinstock wrote for the Daily News until it publication ended in 1954, when he joined Harry Chandler's new afternoon newspaper, the Los Angeles Mirror. He moved to the Times in November 1961 when the Mirror folded.

He died of cancer on January 8, 1970. He was survived by his wife, Hilda of Malibu; a son, James Weinstock; two daughters, Mrs. Joy Clement and Mrs. Jane Krigbaum; and two brothers, Herbert and Charles Weinstock. private services were held at Westwood Memorial Park.

== Books ==
- Weinstock, Matt (1947). My LA. Current Books. p. 239. OCLC 1499593.
- Weinstock, Matt (1951). Muscatel at Noon. Morrow. p. 215. ISBN 978-1-163-81188-7. OCLC 1491206.

== See also ==
- List of newspaper columnists
