= The Right Side of History =

2019 book by Ben Shapiro

The Right Side of History: How Reason and Moral Purpose Made the West Great
- First edition
- Author: Ben Shapiro
- Language: English
- Publisher: Broadside Books
- Publication date: March 19, 2019
- Publication place: United States
- Pages: 288
- ISBN: 978-0-06-285790-3
- Preceded by: Say It's So
- Followed by: Facts Don't Care about Your Feelings

The Right Side of History: How Reason and Moral Purpose Made the West Great is a 2019 book by American conservative political commentator Ben Shapiro. In the book, Shapiro argues that Western civilization is experiencing a crisis and a potential downfall. He asserts that by abandoning Judeo-Christian values and the Greek-born faculty of reason, modern society is hastening this demise, that hedonism and rampant materialism have made humankind susceptible to failure, and that the only way to reverse this decline is to return to the values and faculties that helped shape the Western civilization.

The book was #1 for non-fiction books on the April 7, 2019 New York Times Best Seller list. Reception of the book's coverage of philosophy and history, as well as the arguments presented within it, was mixed .

== Content ==
Shapiro introduces the topic of the book by contrasting the rising quality of life in Western societies with statistics highlighting a societal decline across the West such as increasing levels of polarization, depression, divorce rates, and drug overdose deaths among others. He further references an incident in February 2016, when he gave a speech at California State University, Los Angeles, resulting in a violent confrontation between protesters and those attending Shapiro's event. He points to a loss of Judeo-Christian values and the Greek-based capacity for reasoning throughout the Western world as the chief culprit behind such events and declines.

He further analyzes the sense of discord and disunity amongst those of different political parties and beliefs, and proposes that such a rift was developed due to a drift from the understanding of applied ethics that served as a fundamental building block of Western society. He stresses a need to balance individualism with an ubiquitous sense of respect and empathy – virtues that Shapiro argues can most effectively be attained through an understanding of both Biblical ethics and Aristotelian ethics.

As he details the spread and influence of Judaism upon the ancient peoples of the Southern Levant, he argues that the introduction of Biblical ethics to the Israelites was the first catalyst for the roots of Western civilization to develop. As Christianity adopted Mosaic interpretations of law and morality, the moral guidelines and beliefs exclusive to Judaism became intrinsically inseparable from those of Christianity; hence leading to the Judeo-Christian interpretation of morality. Shapiro regards the second catalyst to be Aristotelian ethics, the basis of which is that one should aspire to become good, not merely to know. He further postulates that upon these two schools of thought coming into contact with one another, they merged into the very basis and foundation for the growth and expansion of Western civilization. According to Shapiro, the two fundamental birthplaces of modern Western society are Jerusalem and Athens, the epicenters of Judeo-Christian faith and Aristotelian reasoning, respectively.

The book addresses the fundamental ideological struggles between Greek thought and Jewish values, and how with the emergence of Christianity both schools of thought reconciled, paving the road for the creation of modern Western civilization. As Christianity spread, Shapiro argues, these two thought systems were spread with it. The spread of these values was further aided by the emergence of Scholasticism in the eleventh century. He posits that the revolutionary intellectual advances achieved during the Enlightenment were correlated with the religious and moral convictions of some of its greatest minds, such as Johannes Kepler and Isaac Newton. Shapiro also argues that the philosophy behind the United States Declaration of Independence was the manifestation of Judeo-Christian values and the Greek gift of reason. He affirms that the inherent greatness of Western civilization can be directly attributed to the success and influence of the Declaration of Independence.

Concerning the division and faults of the modern United States, Shapiro claims that the rejection of Judeo-Christian values in favor of solely Greek Teleology, and the rejection of virtue in favor of moral relativism, are the chief culprits behind the degraded modern condition of Western civilization. He argues that the horrors of World War II, the Holocaust, and the killings of those living under Communist rule are all consequences of discarding morality and virtue as defined by Judeo-Christian ethics. He further argues that a major effect of World War II on the Western world was the loss of optimism; specifically a lack of vision for the future of humanity. With a collective sense of purpose and hope having disintegrated, Shapiro posits that the West has turned to hedonism and materialism in place of Judeo-Christian values and Greek reason.

In closing his book, Shapiro stresses that it is paramount to teach the next generation of children to cherish their existence and the world they live in, that they must recognize and respect the value of their humanity, and that they must be willing to stand up and defend their way of life.

== Reception ==
The book was #1 for non-fiction books on the April 7, 2019 New York Times Best Seller list, and remained on the top 15 list for six weeks, through May 12, 2019.

Reaction from critics ranged from praise for Shapiro's analysis of philosophical concepts and the history surrounding them, to skepticism and criticism of Shapiro's reliance on Judeo-Christian doctrine and the scholarly validity of his arguments. Jonathan Rauch, writing for The New York Times, praised Shapiro's critique of individualism: "Shapiro's spiritual challenge to secularism is not new. In fact, it is venerable. As the liberal tradition's most astute contemporary defender, Peter Berkowitz, often points out, the charge that liberal individualism is self-destructively materialistic is itself an important strand of the liberal tradition." In the same article, however, Rauch criticized Shapiro's coverage of thinkers and ideologies from different time periods within a few pages.

Tracy Lee Simmons of the National Review lauded Shapiro's approach to the subject matter of the book, writing: "This book provides an excursion into the intellectual history of the West, from Mt. Sinai to the latest barbarity in Slate, usefully retold for those who know the story and accessibly digested for those who don't." He also praised Shapiro's arguments that the Age of Enlightenment was spurred by a religious and intellectual desire to explore the nature of the world surrounding humankind: "Indeed, Shapiro credits the intellectual ferment of the Middle Ages with eventually ushering in the scientific revolution from the 16th to the 18th centuries."

John R. Coyne Jr. of The Washington Times praised Shapiro's coverage of Western thought and his analysis of contemporary issues: "In this strongly written survey of Western thought and cogent statement of democratic principle, Mr. Shapiro provides an analysis of our current crisis, its causes and potential cures, advocating a return to the basic values upon which our civilization was built."

Alice Lloyd of The Washington Post criticized Shapiro's application of the theories in the book to figures and themes in recent history.

Sean Illing of Vox debated Shapiro in response to various points and claims made in the book. During the debate, Illing pointed out the history of slavery, segregation, racial violence, and the resulting civil rights movement in the United States, and how such struggles and atrocities were spurred under the banner of Christianity, which Shapiro posited in the book as a guiding force for Western civilization. In addition, Illing criticized Shapiro's coverage and presentation of philosophy.

== See also ==
- Primetime Propaganda, a 2011 book by Shapiro
