= Patricia May =

Chilean anthropologist

Patricia May Urzúa
- Education: University of Chile
- Occupation: Anthropologist
- Spouse: Sergio Sagüez
- Awards: Award of Coherence
- Website: www.escueladelalma.cl/es/

Patricia May Urzúa is a Chilean anthropologist. She graduated from the University of Chile in 1979.

May has worked as a columnist for the newspapers El Sábado and El Mercurio. In 2001, she was named "one of Chile's most outstanding women for her contributions to social sciences and development," a distinction granted by the Chilean government. From 2004 to 2006, she was named "one of 100 leading women in Chile " by Mujeres Empresarias. On 18 July 2007, she received the Award of Coherence from the Laura Rodríguez Foundation, recognizing May as a "model whose values enrich the political and social work of Chile."

== Work ==
According to the magazine Mundo Nuevo, May's work has been "focused on the reflection on evolution, the meaning of life and the spiritual traditions of different cultures." May herself has commented on the analyses she has conducted on "the culture and lifestyle of the post-modern world."

Timeline of works

- Todos los reinos palpitan en ti (in Spanish). Editorial Grijalbo. 2001. ISBN 9789562581196.
- Nuevos pensamientos, nuevos mundos (in Spanish). El Mercurio-Aguilar. 2003. ISBN 9789562392594.
- Vivir conscientes (in Spanish). El Mercurio-Aguilar. 2006. ISBN 9789562394253.
- De la cultura del ego a la cultura del alma (in Spanish). Serpa Consultores. 2007. ISBN 9789563109337.
