= Primetime Propaganda =

2011 book by Ben Shapiro

Primetime Propaganda: The True Hollywood Story of How the Left Took Over Your TV
- Author: Ben Shapiro
- Language: English
- Publisher: Broadside Books
- Publication date: May 2011
- Publication place: United States
- Pages: 416
- ISBN: 978-0-06-193477-3
- Preceded by: Project President
- Followed by: Bullies

Primetime Propaganda: The True Hollywood Story of How the Left Took Over Your TV is a 2011 book by conservative political commentator Ben Shapiro. In it, Shapiro argues that producers, executives and writers in the entertainment industry are using television to promote a left-wing political agenda.

== Content ==
As one part of the evidence, Shapiro presents statements from taped interviews made by celebrities and TV show creators from Hollywood whom he interviewed for the book. The book include quotes from, among others, the co-creator of Friends, Marta Kauffman, and the creator of Soap and the Golden Girls, Susan Harris. Another argument is that conservatives are shunned in the industry. For example, Vin Di Bona, a producer responsible for many hit television shows, agreed during an interview with Shapiro that Hollywood promotes a liberal political agenda, commenting, "I'm happy about it, actually." Di Bona also said that MacGyver, the cult hit show on which he was a producer, promoted an anti-gun movement position, as the character of MacGyver does not use a gun, but rather his own intelligence. People involved with television shows M*A*S*H and Happy Days told Shapiro that they possessed pacifistic and anti-Vietnam War agendas.

Producer Leonard Goldberg stated to Shapiro that in the industry liberalism is "100 percent dominant, and anyone who denies it is kidding, or not telling the truth", and when Shapiro asked if politics are a barrier to entry replied, "Absolutely".

Producer and director Nicholas Meyer replied "Well, I hope so," when asked if conservatives are discriminated against, and stated regarding the 1983 made-for-TV film The Day After that, "My private, grandiose notion was that this movie would unseat Ronald Reagan when he ran for re-election."

Executive Fred Silverman stated regarding TV comedy nowadays that "...there’s only one perspective, and it’s a very progressive perspective. And if you want the other perspective... well it's just not there right now."

TV series COPS creator John Langley stated that he prefers showing segments where whites are the criminals because he fears that he would be promoting negative stereotypes.

Shapiro states that he was "...shocked by the openness of the Hollywood crowd when it came to admitting anti-conservative discrimination inside the industry". He argues that nepotism in Hollywood rarely is familial, but rather is ideological by friends hiring friends with the same ideological views:

Portions of some of the interviews which were released onto the internet to promote the book, particularly the Di Bona interview, caused director and producer Lionel Chetwynd to resign from the Caucus for Producers, Writers & Directors. In an open letter, he wrote about the reaction of other members of the caucus to Republican Party politicians: "In preparing his book, Mr. Shapiro interviewed a large number of our Hollywood notables on the subject of diversity -- not the sacrosanct melange of race, religion, gender orientation and the like, but a more challenging diversity: that of opinion and policy. The vast majority felt quite comfortable endorsing discrimination against those whose political philosophy was not rooted in the reflexive Leftism of Hollywood," and "I knew most of my fellow members looked upon the political positions of these people as distasteful; what I now understand is the disgust was not for their views, but for their very person".

As per an interview with The National Review, another argument by Shapiro is that Hollywood has overemphasized the importance of the 18–49-year-old market for advertisers. Initially, as admitted by executives during the taped interviews, this view was promoted by ABC in the late 1960s since the network had poor ratings and needed to increase advertising revenue in some way.

=== Interview techniques ===
Vin Di Bona stood by the statements quoted from his interview but added that the material "was obtained in a duplicitous manner", accusing Shapiro of misrepresenting the nature of his book prior to interview. Marta Kauffman said that "The idea that we are pushing an agenda is nonsense," adding that "...the dangerous thing about the book is it implies we don't want a dialogue." Another of the interviewees, George Schlatter, rejected suggestions that Hollywood is conspiring to exclude the conservative perspective and accused the right wing of being "guilty of everything they accuse the left wing of".

== Reception ==
Reviewing the book and interviewing Shapiro, Los Angeles Times reporter Patrick Goldstein questioned Shapiro citing The Mary Tyler Moore Show and The Simpsons as examples, as Goldstein argued those shows have "gone over like gangbusters with middle America."

== See also ==
- Media bias in the United States
- 2011 in literature
- The Right Side of History – 2019 book by Shapiro
