= Parke S. Rouse Jr. =

American journalist

- Born: Parke Shepherd Rouse Jr. 1915; Smithfield, Virginia
- Died: March 6, 1997 (aged 81–82); Williamsburg, Virginia
- Occupations: Journalist, Historian, Author
- Writing career
- Pen name: Parke Rouse
- Subject: Virginia History

Parke Shepherd Rouse Jr. (1915 – March 5, 1997) was an American journalist, writer and historian in Tidewater Virginia.

== Biography ==
=== Early life ===
Parke S. Rouse Jr. was a native of the Town of Smithfield. He spent most of his childhood in Newport News, Virginia and was a 1937 graduate of Washington and Lee University in Lexington, Virginia. He served in the U.S. Navy during World War II on the staff of Admiral Chester W. Nimitz.

=== Journalist ===
During his early years as a journalist, prior to World War II, Rouse worked for the Newport News Times-Herald and for the Richmond Times-Dispatch. After the War, Rouse returned to Virginia, where he served as an assistant to the Richmond Times-Dispatch's editor, Virginius Dabney, and later as the paper's Sunday Editor. In later life Rouse wrote a weekly column about Tidewater Virginia for the Newport News Daily Press.

=== Author ===
Rouse combined his love of early Virginia history with his exceptional writing skills to produce 22 books and hundreds of newspaper columns on Virginia history, all marked by their author's innate grace, humor, and storytelling talent. Among Rouse's best-known works were a biography of James Blair, founder and first president of the College of William and Mary; a history of the college president's house; and a popular chronicle of Williamsburg's history before and during its restoration as Colonial Williamsburg by John D. Rockefeller Jr., Abby Aldrich Rockefeller, and the Reverend Dr. W.A.R. Goodwin.

=== Colonial Williamsburg ===
In 1953, Parke Rouse became director of publications for the Colonial Williamsburg Foundation and worked closely with eventual president and chairman of the Foundation, Carlisle H. Humelsine.

=== Commonwealth of Virginia ===
Throughout his adult life, Rouse served in several public positions. In 1950 he joined the Virginia Chamber of Commerce. In 1954, he became the first executive director of Jamestown Festival Park and later the Jamestown-Yorktown Foundation, a post he held for 26 years until his retirement. He served as the director of Virginia's official celebration of Jamestown's 350th anniversary in 1957. From 1974 through 1980, Rouse also served as the Executive Director of the Virginia Independence Bicentennial Commission and assisted in the planning for the 1976 visit of Queen Elizabeth II to Jamestown and Williamsburg. Virginia Governor Gerald Baliles proclaimed Rouse a Virginia Laureate in 1988 in recognition for his "contributions preserving the Commonwealth's heritage."

In 1998, the Virginia General Assembly passed a posthumous Resolution commending his contributions to the Commonwealth.

== Partial bibliography ==
- The City That Turned Back Time; Colonial Williamsburg's First Twenty-five Years. Williamsburg, Va: Colonial Williamsburg Foundation. 1952. OCLC 1023581.
- The Jamestown Festival: Official Program. [S.l.]: Virginia 350th Anniversary Commission. 1957. OCLC 8573077.
- The United States of America and the Commonwealth of Virginia Presents the Jamestown Festival, Celebrating America's 350th Birthday. Richmond: Virginia 350th Anniversary Commission. 1957. OCLC 10049455.
- The Voyage to Jamestown; A Saga of Seamanship. Jamestown, Va: Jamestown Foundation. 1964. OCLC 6259653.
- Virginia: The English Heritage in America. New York: Hastings House. 1966. OCLC 153886701.
- Planters and Pioneers; Life in Colonial Virginia; the Story in Pictures and Text of the People who Settled England's First Successful Colony from its Planting in 1607 to the Birth of the United States in 1789. New York: Hastings House. 1968. ISBN 978-0-8038-5900-5.
- Virginia's Three Capitals: Jamestown, Williamsburg and Richmond. Jamestown, Va: Jamestown Foundation. 1969. OCLC 5970081.
- America's First Legislature. Jamestown, Va: Jamestown Foundation. 1970. OCLC 4895856.
- "Scotland in the Appalachians". Vista/U.S.A. 6 (4): 28–29. Spring 1973. OCLC 76250817.
- Memories of the 1920s: Christmas in Old Virginia. Richmond: Dietz Press. 1975. OCLC 7027847.
- Susan T. Burtch (1980). Berkeley Plantation and Hundred: A Pictorial Presentation of Virginia's Most Historic Plantation. Williamsburg, Va: Williamsburg Pub. Co. OCLC 26679367.
- Deanna Gordon, and Norma Jean Peters (1985). Virginia History and Geography. The World and its People. Morristown, N.J.: Silver Burdett. ISBN 978-0-382-02908-0.
- The Good Old Days in Hampton and Newport News. Richmond, Va: Dietz Press. 1986. OCLC 13983158.
- SSN 750 Newport News Launching March 15, 1986, Newport News Shipbuilding, Newport News, Virginia. Newport News, Va: Newport News Shipbuilding. 1986. OCLC 57410673.
- The President's House: The College of William and Mary, Williamsburg, Virginia. Alexandria, Va.: Hennage Creative Printers. 1993. OCLC 33201942.
- Along Virginia's Golden Shores: Glimpses of Tidewater Life. Richmond, Va: Dietz Press. 1994. ISBN 978-0-87517-079-4.
- George Washington: Patron of Learning and Father of Philanthropy at Washington and Lee University. John L. P. Sullivan, Irwin Taylor Sanders, and James Morrison Hutcheson (co-authors). Lexington, Virginia: Washington and Lee University. 1996. OCLC 36276500.
- We Happy WASPs: Virginia in the Days of Jim Crow and Harry Byrd. Richmond, Virginia: Dietz Press. 1996. ISBN 0-87517-091-9.
- Parke Shepherd Rouse Jr.: 1915–1997. [S.l]: [s.n]. 1997. OCLC 60688846.
- The Great Wagon Road: From Philadelphia to the South. United States: [s.n.] 2004. ISBN 978-0-87517-065-7.
- Jamestown's Story: Act One of the American Dream. Wilford Kale, (ed.). Richmond, Va: Dietz Press. 2006. ISBN 0-87517-132-X.
- Hampton in the Bygone Days: 400 years on the Virginia Peninsula. Wilford Kale, (ed.). Richmond, Va: Dietz Press. 2009. ISBN 978-0-87517-137-1.

== See also ==
- List of newspaper columnists
