= Herbert Lyle Mayfield =

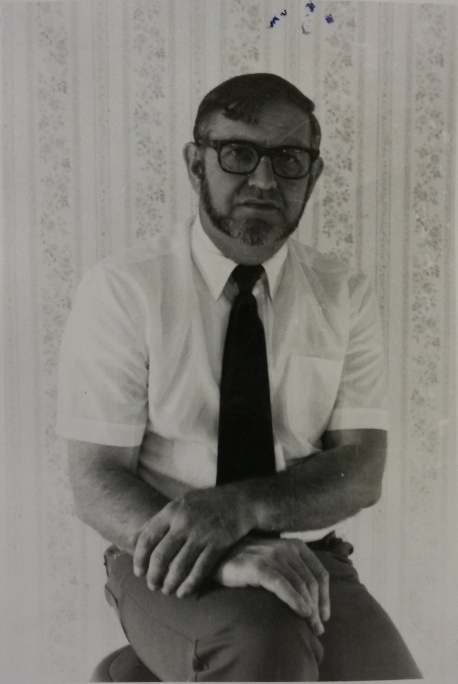
- Lyle Mayfield, 1980

Background information
- Born: March 4, 1929; Greenville, Illinois
- Died: March 31, 2012 (aged 83) St. Louis, Missouri
- Genres: traditional folk, traditional country, gospel, swing
- Occupations: musician, singer-songwriter, inventor, writer, printer, poet
- Years active: 1935–2012
- Label: self-produced
- Website: http://mayfieldmusiccompany.com, http://greenfieldrecords.com

Herbert Lyle Mayfield, known generally as Lyle, (March 4, 1929 – March 31, 2012) was an American writer, poet, printer, inventor of musical instruments, and folk musician and composer from Greenville, Illinois. He spent most of his adult life working in the printing trade as a profession, but spent most of his spare time designing and building hybrid folk instruments and performing at live music events with his wife Doris (Mindrup) Mayfield and youngest son, Layne Mayfield. Lyle is notable for his invention of both the guitalin and guinjo, hybrid folk instruments combining features of several traditional folk instruments.

== Early life and family ==
The Mayfield family music story began in the mid-1930s when Lyle’s mother purchased him a 25-cent harmonica. She turned to the seven-year-old and said, "Learn to play it, son. I like French harp music." Next came the acquisition of a six-dollar, used guitar. The friend he bought it from showed Lyle three chords. Eight months later the friend’s band had a new guitar player.

In 1950, Lyle Mayfield married Doris Mindrup, and less than a year later the couple were doing their own radio show on WSMI in Litchfield, Illinois, as the "Bond County Sweethearts." The title changed to "The Mayfield Family" as their children (oldest to youngest) David, Lynda and Layne came on the scene. David made his debut on the show at the age of three months. He lay in an empty guitar case in the studio while Mom and Pop crooned. One day he decided to add a little harmony of his own. Lyle apologized to the listeners for the unexpected voice in the background. A listener wrote in saying, "Don’t apologize. It’s the best music on your show."

== Musical Performance career ==
Throughout the latter half of the 20th century, the Mayfields appeared to perform at hundreds of festivals, picnics, shows, church activities, benefits, square dances and ordinary jam sessions. Some of the highlights include bookings at the Olde Towne School of Folk Music in Chicago (where they were once an act in the same concert as bluegrass artist Bill Monroe), The First Annual Arkansas Folk Festival, The Lincoln Jamboree in Kentucky, Illinois State Fair, The 1976 Bi-Centennial Smithsonian Folklife Festival held in Washington, D.C., and various other functions from Kansas City to Grand Rapids to St. Louis to Indianapolis to Battle Ground, Indiana.

Starting with their first 45 rpm single in 1964, the Mayfields recorded two singles, one LP and more than 40 self-produced cassette albums. They have also contributed to several other albums for various folk music groups around the country. In 1964, they cut five bands on an album of folk music produced by the Campus Folksong Club at the University of Illinois. It was entitled "Green Fields of Illinois." From this Lyle came up with the inspiration for the song "Green Fields of Illinois", which a local state senator briefly worked and failed to get accepted as the state song of Illinois. It became the duo's theme song and is the title song of their LP album "Green Fields Re-Visited."

From a repertoire of songs and influences numbering in the thousands, the Mayfields brought a family-oriented program ranging from folksongs to popular tunes of the 1930s and 1940s to classic country to down home gospel. They supplemented this with many of their own original compositions. They owned and played a variety of instruments, several of which Lyle designed and built himself. Among these inventions were the guitalin and guinjo. Upon Lyle's death, there were more than 100 instruments counted in the Mayfield home.

Lyle worked as a journeyman printer for many newspapers in Southern Illinois, including The Greenville Advocate for many years. He was a columnist for the Advocate with his column entitled "Thoughts In Passing", which ran in the paper for several years. In 1949 he helped establish the Explorer Scouts in Greenville, Illinois, and in 1950 was a founding member of Boy Scout Troop 50 in Greenville.

In the 1960s, Lyle and Doris Mayfield were involved in the [[ |name = University of Illinois at Urbana–Champaign]] Campus Folksong Club and were associated with Archie Green during that time. In the mid-1960s, Lyle was credited for bringing the native music of Illinois to the Campus Folksong Club and appeared on recordings that the club produced, including the "Green Fields of Illinois" record. He and Doris regularly appeared in performances held by the Folksong Club, commonly referred to as "folk sings". They also volunteered their time and talents to perform for other events and venues. In 1976, Lyle and Doris Mayfield, along with their son Layne, were invited by the Smithsonian Institution to represent Southern Illinois at the American Bicentennial Smithsonian Folklife Festival. It was at this event that they had a good opportunity to showcase some of their unique folk instruments; namely the guitalin and guinjo. Throughout most of the 1970s, the Mayfields devoted much time to preserving traditional southern Illinois music and folklore. Additionally, they were the founders and principle sponsors of the annual Southern Illinois Folk Convention in the early 1970s.

== Later life and death ==
Lyle stated over a phone interview with the host of "Living in Illinois" (a radio show based in Springfield, Illinois) that "in the mid-1920s, three 50,000-watt radio stations created a triangular area and bombarded it with live music, introducing musical sounds from around the United States and the world. Those who lived in that golden triangle of sound absorbed it all. I can't say with any degree of certainty how this affected aspiring musicians in other areas, but in my neck of the woods musicians digested it all, and what we absorbed filtered into our own musical creativity."

Through his ongoing musical career, Lyle cited Eddy Arnold as one of the strongest influences in the urban audiences of acceptance of "hillbilly music", renaming it, more politely, "Traditional Country". As recordings obtained more quality and availability, the era from the 1930s to the 1960s covered the region of Southern Illinois with a thick blanket of melodies and lyrics.

While the Mayfields tried not to restrict themselves from listening to any one brand of music, they took issue with mutations of their dearly-held musical terminology. Lyle scoffed at Bob Dylan being held as a folk songwriter, saying, "you don't write a popular folk song. That music evolved; it tells a story." Lyle said that some of Dylan's music may become folk if it lasts a few generations. He disliked new country, saying there was "no such thing". He also didn't like hard rock and was adamant that rap had "nothing to do with music". Bluegrass to Lyle was a "Johnny-come-lately" to his part of the country and he seemed to only enjoy it in its pure form.

Throughout their region, Lyle and Doris Mayfield were known for helping to keep the history of music alive by "vivid recall and recitation". Lyle died from complications with a Bilateral Watershed Stroke on March 31, 2012, after being in a coma-like state for 2 to 3 days.

== Lyle & Doris Mayfield Discography ==
- Green Fields of Illinois (Various Artists including Lyle & Doris Mayfield)-1963
- The Old and The New (4-song 45 rpm record by Lyle & Doris Mayfield)-1964
- 2nd Single (2-song 45 rpm record by Lyle & Doris Mayfield)-1969
- Green Fields Re-Visited (First full-length album by Lyle & Doris Mayfield)-1976
- Songs ‘n Memories (Lyle & Doris Mayfield)-1983
- Songs I’m Glad I Wrote (Lyle Mayfield) (1984)
- Thanks Johnny For The Songs I Learned From You (Lyle Mayfield) (1987)
- Songs From The Golden Book (Doris Mayfield)-1987
- The Devil Tole Me Not To Do It (Lyle & Doris Mayfield)-1988
- Gospel Singing According To The Mayfields (Lyle & Doris Mayfield)-1988
- Let Me Sing You a Story (Lyle Mayfield) (1988)
- Uncle Fud & The Cracker Barrell Committee (Lyle Mayfield) (1989)
- News From Rooby Doo (Lyle Mayfield) (1989)
- The Balin’ Wire Band (Lyle & Doris Mayfield)-1989
- The Roots of Country Music (Lyle & Doris Mayfield)-1989
- My Friends In Song (Doris Mayfield)-1989
- Folksongs By Doris “Momma” Mayfield (Doris Mayfield)-12/26/1989
- Don’t Burn My Flag (Lyle & Doris Mayfield)-1990
- Sing Me Something Soft (Lyle Mayfield) (1990)
- The Firebird & Friends (Lyle Mayfield) (1/30/1991)
- The Fiddlefield Band (Lyle Mayfield) (3/6/1991)
- 86 Strings and 20 Reeds (Lyle Mayfield) (1991)
- Autobiography (Lyle Mayfield) (1991)
- The Banjo Is Still King (Lyle Mayfield) (1991)
- What In The World Is a Guinjo? (Lyle Mayfield) (1991)
- Thanks, Mom, For The Harmonica (Lyle Mayfield) (1991)
- The Omnichord (Lyle Mayfield) (1991)
- My Favorite Musical Recipe (Lyle Mayfield) (1991)
- The Live Wire Band (Lyle Mayfield) (1991)
- Guitar Grab Bag (Lyle Mayfield) (1991)
- Workin’ The Strings (Lyle Mayfield) (10/28/1994)
- No Guitars (Lyle Mayfield) (March 1995)
- At Garold’s (Doris Mayfield)-8/26/1995
- I Am America (Lyle Mayfield) (1996)
- Take Me Back To Country Music (Lyle Mayfield) (1996)
- Songs To Grow Up With (Lyle Mayfield) (1996)
- The Four Corner Posts of Life (Lyle & Doris Mayfield)-1996
- Let Me Serve In The Name of The Lord (Lyle & Doris Mayfield)-1996
- Santa’s Got Problems (Lyle Mayfield) (December 1996)
- Momma Mayfield Sings Country (Doris Mayfield)-1996
- Buried Treasures Re-Claimed (Lyle Mayfield) (1997)
- Pieces of The Puzzle (Lyle Mayfield) (1997)
- The Best of Doris “Momma” Mayfield (Doris Mayfield)-1997
- Cross Section (Lyle Mayfield) (1998)
- Spanning The Years (Lyle Mayfield) (1999)
- Memories To Live With (Lyle Mayfield) (2000)
- I Call It Midwestern Swing (Lyle Mayfield) (2000)
- Our Story In Song (Lyle & Doris Mayfield)-2000
- The Magnificent Toy (Lyle Mayfield) (2001)
- From Devils To Angels (Lyle Mayfield) (2001)
- Green Fields Re-Visited Again (Lyle & Doris Mayfield)-2001
- A Hillbilly Orchestra (Lyle Mayfield) (8/1/2001)
- The Mighty Midget (Lyle Mayfield) (12/22/2001)
- Stringin’ Along With “Momma” Mayfield (Doris Mayfield)-2002
- Still Stringin’ Along (Doris Mayfield)-2002
- The Best of The Mayfields (Lyle & Doris Mayfield)-2002
- Faith, Praise & Inspiration (Lyle & Doris Mayfield)-2003
- The Green Fields Legacy (Box Set) (Lyle & Doris Mayfield)-2003
- Homemade (Lyle & Doris Mayfield)-2003
- Just Bein’ Me (Lyle Mayfield) (2003)
- Goin’ Electronic (Lyle Mayfield) (2004)
- Momma’s Kind of Songs (Lyle Mayfield) (2004)
- At My Best (Lyle Mayfield) (5/22/2004)
- Show Me The Road Back To Love (Lyle & Doris Mayfield)-2005
- A Garden Full of Pretty Flowers (Lyle Mayfield) (2005)
- Two Guitalins (Lyle Mayfield) (December 5 & 6, 2005)
- The Electric Banjo (Lyle Mayfield) (2005)
- The Sugar Pear Tree (Doris Mayfield)-2005
- Songs Momma Would Have Liked (Lyle Mayfield) (2006)
- Inspirations (Lyle Mayfield) (2006)
- Lift Up Our Flag (Lyle & Doris Mayfield)-2006
- Rolling Back The Years (Doris Mayfield)-2006
- She’s My World (Lyle Mayfield) (12/12/2006)
- Blue Grass Music From The Green Fields (Lyle Mayfield) (6/11/2008)
- Me ‘n Mandy (Lyle Mayfield) (11/22/2008)
- The Comfort Zone (Lyle Mayfield) (2008)
- With Jerry’s Guitar (Lyle Mayfield) (2008)
- With Marty’s 12-String (Lyle Mayfield) (2008)
- Moments In Memory (Lyle Mayfield) (2008)
- Mostly Flat Pickin’ (Lyle Mayfield) (2008)
- Let’s Swing (Lyle Mayfield) (2008)
- Merry Christmas From The Mayfields (Lyle & Doris Mayfield)-2008
- Our Country Best (Lyle & Doris Mayfield)-2009
- Footsteps-The Final Recordings (Lyle Mayfield) (2012)

== Notable Works of Literature ==
- "The Old Trees Die the Hardest" (selected entries from Lyle's column "Thoughts in Passing", from the pages of The Greenville, Illinois, Advocate)
- "Whatever Happened to Red Haw Jelly? (and other Thoughts in Passing" selections of Lyle's choosing, published in 1973.
- "The Ballad of Melissa" – a story based on an old folk legend from the turn-of-the-century in Southern Illinois about a girl who was found frozen in the snow, seven miles from her home.
- "Through A Broken Window Pane" – A poetic collection of thoughts composed by Lyle from 1947 through 2006.
