= Froma Harrop =

American writer and author (born 1950)

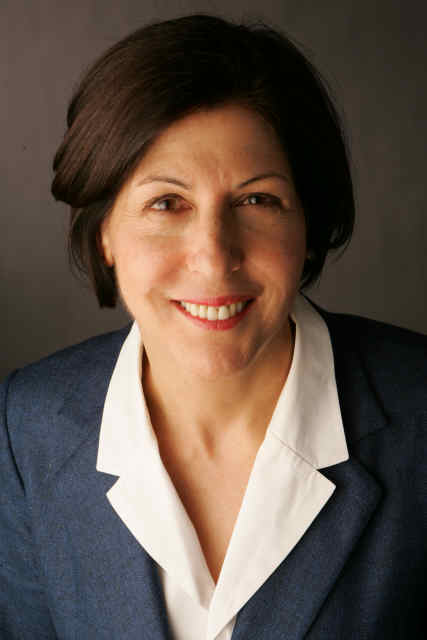
- Born: March 18, 1950 (age 76); New York City
- Status: Widowed
- Education: New York University
- Occupation: Columnist
- Notable credit: Top 100 Syndicated Columnists
- Children: 2
- Website: http://www.fromaharrop.com

Froma Harrop (born March 18, 1950, in New York City) is an American writer and author.

== Early life ==
Born in New York City, Harrop was raised in suburban Long Island and attended New York University. She graduated in 1972.

== Career ==
Harrop worked at the financial desk at Reuters, covering business and the Federal Reserve, and later became a business editor for The New York Times News Service. She then worked as a business writer for the Providence Journal in Rhode Island and subsequently joined the Journal's editorial board, where she was a member until 2013. Harrop currently resides in Providence and New York City.

Harrop is a past president of the Association of Opinion Journalists, formerly known as the National Conference of Editorial Writers.

== Awards ==
- Bastiat Prize for Journalism finalist in 2015.
- Loeb Awards finalist for economic commentary in 2011.
- Loeb Awards finalist for economic commentary in 2004.
