= Jeanne Phillips =

American journalist

- Born: 1942 (age 83–84); Minneapolis, Minnesota, U.S.
- Known for: Dear Abby
- Spouses: Luke McKissack (m. 1973, divorced) M. Walter Harris (m. 2001; died 2020)
- Parent: Pauline Phillips (mother)
- Relatives: Eppie Lederer (aunt); Dean Phillips (nephew)

Jeanne Phillips (/ˈdʒiːni/ JEE-nee; born 1942), also known as Abigail Van Buren, is an American advice columnist who wrote for the advice column Dear Abby from the 1980s to July 2026. She was born in Minneapolis to Pauline Esther Phillips, who founded Dear Abby in 1956.

Jeanne Phillips' Dear Abby column is syndicated in about 1,400 newspapers in the U.S. with a combined circulation of more than 110 million. Dear Abby's website receives about 10,000 letters per week, seeking advice on a large variety of personal matters.

== Dear Abby ==
=== Jeanne Phillips' history with Dear Abby ===
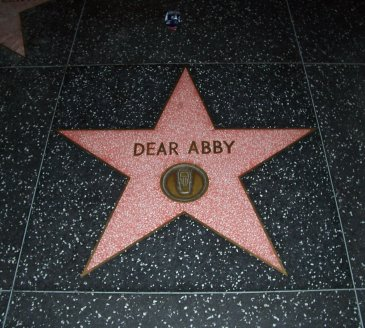
Dear Abby star on the Hollywood Walk of Fame memorializing the Dear Abby radio show

When you're having lunch with her, you get the urge to put down your butter knife, spill your life story and shed tears. Maybe it's her endearing lisp, her Midwest upbringing or her unblinking eyes. Or maybe she just gives more of a darn.

— Neal Justin in the Star Tribune

Jeanne Phillips began assisting her mother, Pauline Phillips, with the Dear Abby column at the age of 14 in order to earn an allowance. When Jeanne asked her mother for an allowance, Pauline answered, "What are you going to do for it?" Pauline then said that her Dear Abby column received a substantial amount of mail from teenagers and that Jeanne could reply to some of them. If Jeanne's responses were "good", her mother would use them in the column. If her responses were not good, Jeanne would rewrite them. Jeanne spent her allowance money on watching movies and plays. She went to San Francisco several times to see the play, Li'l Abner.

In the 1970s, Phillips helped her mother write over half of the columns for her nationally syndicated radio show on CBS News. In 1980, she became the radio show's column executive editor, and in 1987, she became its co-editor. Phillips spent six years helping with the radio show. Beginning in 1987, she worked with her mother on the nationally syndicated Dear Abby column. She began writing a majority of the columns since the early 1990s, though her mother did not publicly acknowledge her as the column's co-writer until 2000. Jeanne worked as the writer, while Pauline edited. While Pauline remained at home, Jeanne would manage the office and their paid staff. Mother and daughter were listed as the writers after a December 12, 2000, letter to readers. A photo of the two was affixed to each column. Beginning on July 22, 2002, Jeanne was attributed as the only writer, adding "Dear Abby is written by Abigail Van Buren, also known as Jeanne Phillips, and was founded by her mother, Pauline Phillips" at the bottom of each column. Kathie Kerr, a spokeswoman for Universal Press Syndicate, the distributor of the column, said: "Over the past couple of years, Pauline Phillips hasn't had any day-to-day activities with the column." The column's photo, which had both the mother and daughter, was replaced with only the daughter's photo.

As of 2009, her column reaches 110 million people through syndication in about 1,400 newspapers. Every week, she gets from 5,000 to 10,000 letters and emails asking her for advice. Owing to email's growing usage, by 2013 less than 10% of her letters were through postal mail. Phillips said she yearned for tangible letters for being more intimate because as described by the Palm Beach Daily News she could see "tear stains on the stationery, the smell of cigarette smoke in the paper, the penmanship style and other things that reflect the individual writing". Reading and replying to the mail sometimes takes her more than eight hours a day. After crafting a response, Phillips sets it aside. A few days later, she reviews it to ensure that her feelings about the subject remain unchanged. When she is not knowledgeable about a subject, she consults experts from various fields, including "medical, psychiatric, legal, ethical", and religious. Phillips noted that the column touches on numerous topics, including "organ donation, domestic violence, mental health, child safety, volunteerism, civility, alcohol abuse, inhalant abuse ... and the dangers of tobacco". According to Pernell Watson of the Daily Press, Phillips will send an unprinted, confidential reply to readers who send a "self-addressed, stamped envelope".

On Valentine's Day in 2001, the Dear Abby radio show was honored with the 2,172nd star on the Hollywood Walk of Fame. Around 60 family members and friends took part in the 30-minute ceremony. Jeanne Phillips paid the $15,000 sponsorship fee for the star and its maintenance to honor her mother. The Dear Abby radio show lasted for 12 years. Jeanne wrote and produced Pauline's shows; Pauline was the host.

In 2018, Phillips counseled a letter writer not to name their kids with "unusual" names. She wrote, "Not only can foreign names be difficult to pronounce and spell, but they can also cause a child to be teased unmercifully. Sometimes the name can be a problematic word in the English language. And one that sounds beautiful in a foreign language can be grating in English." The New York Times's John Eligon said her response sparked fierce discussion on social media and "has inspired a fresh debate about identity, acceptance and inclusion".

=== Style and support of gay marriage ===
Jeanne Phillips characterized her mother's style as "softer", while she herself "[gets] to the root of the problem quickly". Both Jeanne and Pauline have made gay marriage a topic in their column. In 1984, Pauline directed the parent of a gay child to Parents and Friends of Lesbians and Gays (PFLAG). In 2007, Jeanne openly announced her support of gay marriage. In the same year, she was given the "Straight for Equality" award by PFLAG.

=== Operation Dear Abby ===
During the Vietnam War, in 1967, Phillips' mother started Operation Dear Abby, through which holiday messages were sent to American soldiers. Phillips' mother was inspired to create this service when Billy Thompson, a sergeant, requested a letter from home for his Christmas present.

When the 2001 anthrax attacks occurred, the operation was postponed. Jeanne Phillips collaborated with United States Department of the Navy Manpower & Reserve Affairs to create an Internet-based substitute at "AnyServiceMember.mil". In 2003, the website received on average 20,000 to 30,000 messages every day. Prior to the Iraq War, the website received only 2,000 to 3,000 messages every day.

The messages are categorized by state and uniformed service but are not sent to specific individuals. Soldiers received the messages by either accessing them on OperationDearAbby.net or when their officers printed out the messages for distribution.

=== Interviews and media ===
Phillips has appeared on many television talk shows, including multiple appearances on CNN's Larry King Live. Many prestigious national organizations have acknowledged her for her advice and efforts to educate her readers on different topics including those related to health, safety, and acceptance of multiculturalism and diversity.

On December 1, 2005, Jeanne made her first live radio broadcast via Internet radio. In her press release regarding that broadcast, she said that she sometimes calls people who have written her since, in many cases, it is easier to advise people over the phone than through letters.

=== Retirement ===
Jeanne Phillips announced her retirement in the Dear Abby column published July 27, 2026. The column continues to be published, written by an editorial team.

== Personal life ==
Jeanne Phillips was born in Minneapolis, Minnesota, to Pauline Esther "Popo" Phillips, the founder of Dear Abby, and Morton Phillips in 1942. Her grandfather, Jay Phillips, was born in Russia in 1898 and immigrated to Wisconsin when he was two years old. When Jeanne was three years old, her family moved from Minnesota to Eau Claire, Wisconsin. Phillips went to elementary school in Hillsborough, California, and attended Burlingame High School for two years. After her sophomore year she transferred to Crystal Springs Uplands School and attended the private school for one year. Shortly thereafter, her family moved back to Twin Cities in Minnesota so her father could take the helm of her grandfather's liquor distribution business. For her senior year she attended Washburn High School in Minneapolis. Phillips enjoyed the school, saying, "I loved it. I was never the most popular girl in the class. I never aspired to be. But I did make very nice friends." In college, she majored in English and anthropology, and studied anthropology at the University of Colorado and UCLA though she did not work in the field. She attempted interior design and ran the company Jeanne Phillips Interiors but ultimately decided it was unsatisfactory.

Phillips' aunt, Esther Pauline "Eppie" Lederer, Pauline's twin sister and the final columnist of the Ask Ann Landers advice column, died in June 2002. In addition to penning a tribute column, Phillips read a poem about her aunt on Larry King Live. In an interview with the South Florida Sun-Sentinel in 2001, Lederer said: "Jeanne has been working with her mother for 20 years, and it seems to be a perfect fit." Lederer's daughter, Margo Howard, wrote an advice column for 45 years until 2013. After Phillips' appearance on Larry King Live, her cousin Howard censured her. Phillips said: "The term a lot of people have been using is feud. All I can say, and this is from my heart to yours, there's no feud on my part. I wish my cousin the best."

Phillips married Luke McKissack on September 16, 1973, at the Beverly Wilshire Hotel. The California Supreme Court Justice Stanley Mosk officiated at the wedding and Herb Alpert performed. Phillips wore an "antique lace gown". Eppie Lederer and her husband and Irving Stone and his wife were among the attendees. She called him "brilliant, charming, talented" , and he was a California lawyer. The marriage was not successful. She planned to remain single but later fell in love again. In 2001, she married her second husband, a real estate investor named M. Walter Harris. Harris died on March 5, 2020, of lung cancer.

Every day, Phillips read the letters sent to her Dear Abby column and penned her column in the afternoon. When asked who her Dear Abby was, Phillips replied that her husband was her "primary support" and her friends her "secondary support".

She has largely kept her personal life to herself, making only occasional references to it while advising people or during interviews. Her second husband died of lung cancer in 2020. In comparison to her cousin, Margo Howard, Phillips has been called "reserved".

Phillips had a brother, Edward "Eddie" Phillips, who was born in 1945 and died in 2011 of multiple myeloma. According to his obituary in the Star Tribune, Eddie was a "liquor tycoon", a "gifted businessman", and a philanthropist who "enlarged a family tradition of generous giving". He had four children: sons Dean, Tyler, and J.J., and a daughter Hutton; the latter two were twins.

According to a 2002 interview, Phillips and her husband have no children. In 2002, the Phillips family revealed that Jeanne's mother, Pauline, had been diagnosed with Alzheimer's disease. Tim Johnson, a medical journalist for ABC News, wrote in February 2010 that Pauline resides with her husband, Morton, in Minnetonka, Minnesota and has caregivers. Pauline's son, Eddie, said:

We call them angels because they are who are with her 24/7. She watches a lot of television. She loves visitors. She loves to get out. And when she gets out she still wears her Dear Abby sweatshirt and loves to smile and wave and blow kisses.

Pauline Phillips died in 2013 at the age of 94.

Phillips is Jewish. In her column, she writes holiday greetings to people of many religions and occasionally gives advice to people based on their religion.

On August 14, 2018, Phillips' nephew Dean won the Democratic (Democratic-Farmer-Labor Party) nomination for United States Congress from Minnesota's 3rd congressional district. On November 6, Dean went on to win the general election during the 2018 midterm elections.

== See also ==
- List of newspaper columnists
