= Ben Shapiro =

American political commentator (born 1984)

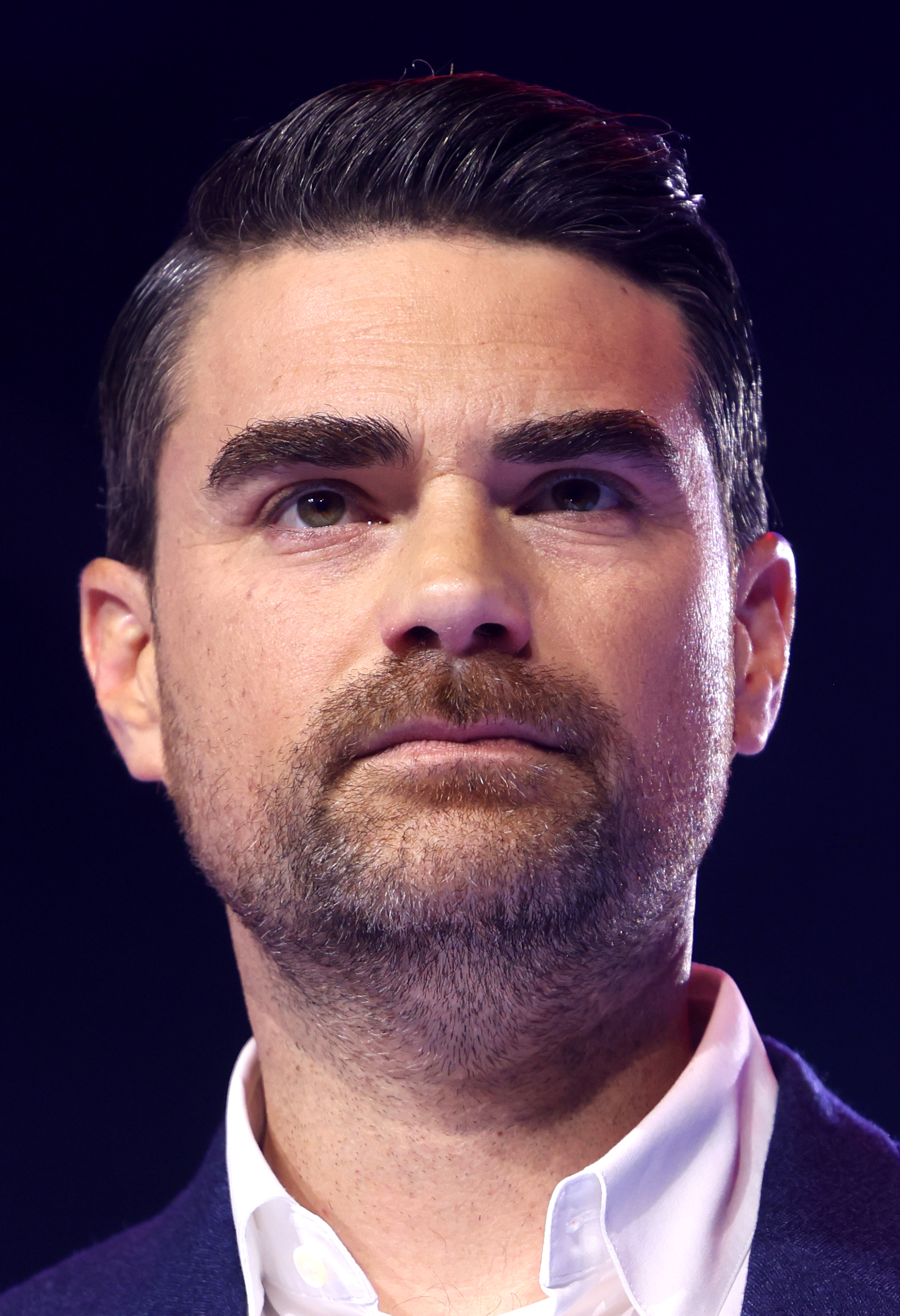
- Shapiro in 2025
- Born: Benjamin Aaron Shapiro; January 15, 1984 (age 42); Burbank, California, U.S.
- Education: University of California, Los Angeles (BA); Harvard University (JD)
- Occupations: Political commentator; media host
- Political party: Republican
- Spouse: Mor Toledano (m. 2008)
- Children: 5
- Relatives: Mara Wilson (cousin)
- Shapiro's voice Shapiro on his opinions on the first presidency and personality of Donald Trump; Recorded January 23, 2018

Benjamin Aaron Shapiro (born January 15, 1984) is an American conservative political commentator and media host. He writes columns for Creators Syndicate, Newsweek, and Ami Magazine, and is editor emeritus for The Daily Wire, which he co-founded in 2015. Shapiro has been the host of The Ben Shapiro Show since 2015, a daily political podcast and live radio show. He was editor-at-large of Breitbart News from 2012 until his resignation in 2016. Shapiro has also authored 16 non-fiction books.

Shapiro has described his political views as economically libertarian and socially conservative, and is critical of the alt-right movement. He opposes abortion, gun control, same-sex marriage, transgender rights, and the Affordable Care Act. He supports capital punishment, tax cuts, and the 2003 invasion of Iraq. He has condemned Hamas and praised Israel and the IDF in their role in the ongoing Gaza war and overall Israeli–Palestinian conflict.

== Early life and education ==
Benjamin Aaron Shapiro was born on January 15, 1984, in Burbank, California, to a Conservative Jewish family. He is Ashkenazi Jewish. When he was 9 years old, his family began to observe Orthodox Judaism. He started playing violin at five years old and performed at the Israel Bonds Banquet in 1996 at age 12. His parents both worked in Hollywood; his mother was a TV company executive and his father, David Shapiro, worked as a composer.

Shapiro went from Walter Reed Middle School in the San Fernando Valley to Yeshiva University High School of Los Angeles in Westside, Los Angeles, where he graduated in 2000 at age 16. He studied political science at the University of California, Los Angeles, graduating in 2004 at age 20 with a Bachelor of Arts, summa cum laude, and membership in Phi Beta Kappa. He then attended Harvard Law School, where he studied under liberal law professors Lani Guinier and Randall Kennedy. Shapiro was a Claremont Institute Publius Fellow in 2006. He graduated from Harvard in 2007 with a Juris Doctor (J.D.), cum laude.

== Career ==
=== 2012: Law ===
After graduating from law school, Shapiro entered private practice at the law firm Goodwin Procter but left after 10 months. As of March 2012, he ran an independent legal consultancy firm, Benjamin Shapiro Legal Consulting, in Los Angeles.

=== 2004–2021: Author ===
Shapiro became interested in politics at a young age. He started a nationally syndicated column when he was 17, becoming the youngest nationally syndicated columnist in the United States, and had written two books by age 21.

In his first book Brainwashed: How Universities Indoctrinate America's Youth (2004), Shapiro argues that the American Left has ideological dominance over universities and that professors do not tolerate non-left opinions.

In 2011, HarperCollins published Shapiro's fourth book, Primetime Propaganda: The True Hollywood Story of How the Left Took Over Your TV, in which Shapiro argues that Hollywood has a left-wing agenda that it actively promotes through prime-time entertainment programming. In the book, the producers of Happy Days and M*A*S*H say they pursued a pro-pacifist, anti-Vietnam-War agenda in those series. Shapiro also became a fellow at the David Horowitz Freedom Center.

In 2013, Threshold Editions published Shapiro's fifth book, Bullies: How the Left's Culture of Fear and Intimidation Silences Americans. In 2017, he released his only novel, True Allegiance, a book about "An illegal immigrant crisis breaking out along America's Southern border". In 2019, Shapiro published the book The Right Side of History: How Reason and Moral Purpose Made the West Great, which focuses on the importance of Judeo-Christian values and laments their decline in modern America.

In 2021, Shapiro published the book The Authoritarian Moment, which argues that there is no pressing authoritarian threat in U.S. politics from the right wing. Instead, he argues that the authoritarian threat comes from the left's control of academia, Hollywood, journalism, and corporate America.

=== 2012–2016: Breitbart News ===
In 2012, Shapiro became editor-at-large of Breitbart News, a news outlet founded by Andrew Breitbart. After Breitbart came under the leadership of Steve Bannon, Shapiro attempted to distance himself from him.

Shapiro resigned from his position as editor-at-large of Breitbart News in March 2016 following what he characterized as the website's lack of support for reporter Michelle Fields in response to her alleged assault by Corey Lewandowski, Donald Trump's former campaign manager, in spite of video and eyewitness evidence of the assault. In his resignation statement, Shapiro stated, "Steve Bannon is a bully, and has sold out Andrew Breitbart's mission in order to back another bully, Donald Trump; he has shaped the company into Trump's personal Pravda".

Shapiro defended Bannon when he was accused of antisemitism.

=== 2015–present: Host and The Daily Wire ===
Shapiro on The Ben Shapiro Show set in 2018

In 2012, Shapiro joined KRLA-AM 870 as a host on their morning radio program alongside Heidi Harris and Brian Whitman. By 2016, he was one of the hosts for KRLA's The Morning Answer talk show. Despite pressure from Salem Media executives for show hosts to be more supportive of Donald Trump during the 2016 United States presidential election, Shapiro remained critical of Trump throughout the campaign.

Shapiro and Jeremy Boreing founded The Daily Wire on September 21, 2015. He serves as editor emeritus as well as the host of his online political podcast The Ben Shapiro Show, which is broadcast every weekday. As of March 2019, the podcast was ranked by Podtrac as the second most popular podcast in the U.S. Westwood One began syndicating The Ben Shapiro Show podcast to radio in April 2018. In 2018, Politico described the podcast as "massively popular". In January 2019, Westwood One expanded Shapiro's one-hour podcast-to-radio program, adding a nationally syndicated two-hour live radio show, for three hours of Ben Shapiro programming daily. As of March 2019, according to Westwood One, The Ben Shapiro Show was being carried by more than 200 stations, and was broadcast in nine of the top ten markets.

In September 2018, Shapiro started hosting The Ben Shapiro Election Special on Fox News. The limited-run series covered news and issues relating to the 2018 midterm elections. Shapiro has made frequent appearances on PragerU with talks on intersectionality and Hollywood with 4,900,000 to 8,400,000 views as of December 2018.

In 2021, Ben Shapiro's podcast was ranked 9th most listened to on Apple podcasts. In June 2020, Shapiro stepped down from his role as editor-in-chief of The Daily Wire — a position he'd held since the site's founding — taking on the role of editor emeritus.

=== 2016–present: Speaker ===
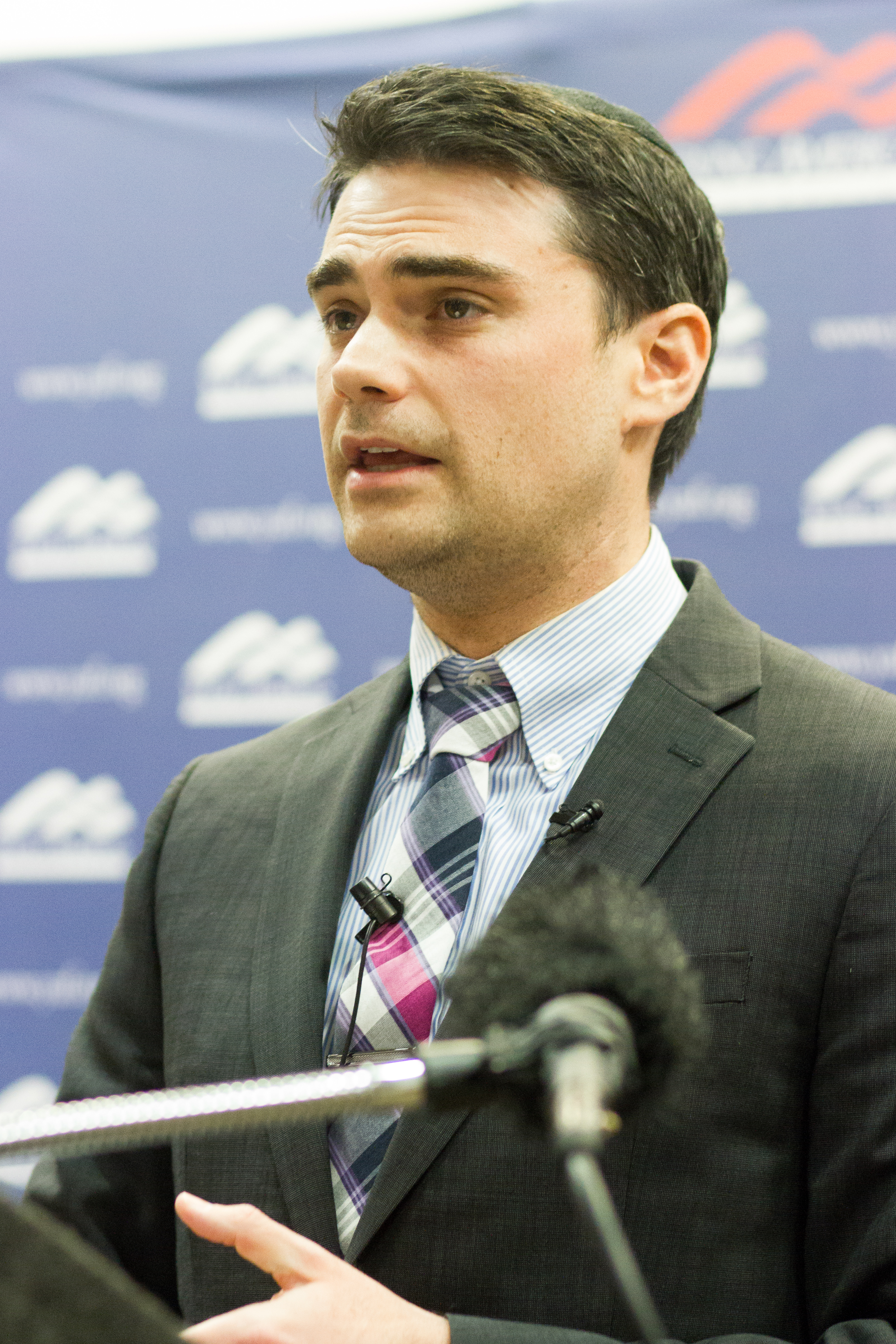
Shapiro at the University of Missouri in 2015

Shapiro speaks at college campuses across the United States. In his speeches, he often presents a conservative viewpoint on controversial subjects. He spoke at 37 campuses between early 2016 and late 2017.

Some students and faculty members at California State University, Los Angeles, objected to a speech that Shapiro, who was then an editor at Breitbart News, was scheduled to hold at the university on February 25, 2016, titled "When Diversity Becomes a Problem". University president William Covino canceled the speech three days before it was to take place, intending to reschedule it so that the event could feature various viewpoints on campus diversity. Covino ultimately reversed his decision, allowing the speech to go on as planned. The day of the speech, student protesters formed human chains, blocking the doors to the event and staging sit-in protests. When Shapiro began his speech, a protester pulled the fire alarm. After the speech ended, Shapiro was escorted out by campus police. Conservative youth organization Young America's Foundation (YAF) announced it was filing a lawsuit against the university (with Shapiro as one of the plaintiffs), claiming that the First and Fourteenth Amendment rights of the students were violated by Covino's attempted cancellation of the event as well as by the physical barricading of students from entering or leaving the event.

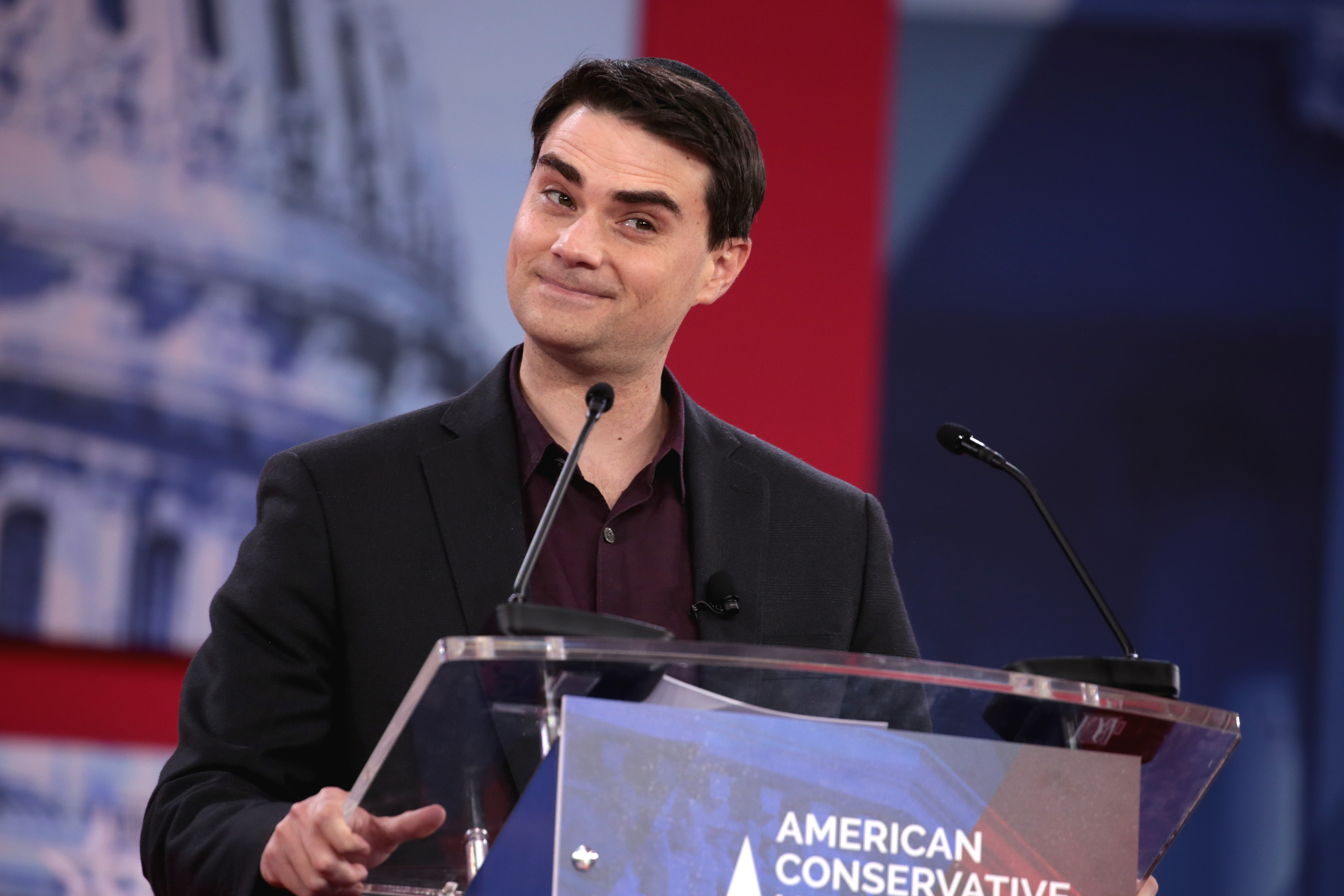
Shapiro speaking at CPAC 2018

In August 2016, DePaul University revoked an invitation for Shapiro to address students at the school and barred him from entering the campus owing to "security concerns".

On September 14, 2017, Shapiro gave a speech at the invitation of the University of California, Berkeley, student organization Berkeley College Republicans, in which he criticized identity politics. The event was supported by the YAF and BCR. It involved a large police presence, which had been promised by Berkeley Chancellor Carol T. Christ in her August letter that supported free speech. Together, the university and the city of Berkeley spent $600,000 (equivalent to $788,080 in 2025) on police and security for the event, which transpired with nine arrests but no major incidents.

=== 2013–present: Other activities ===
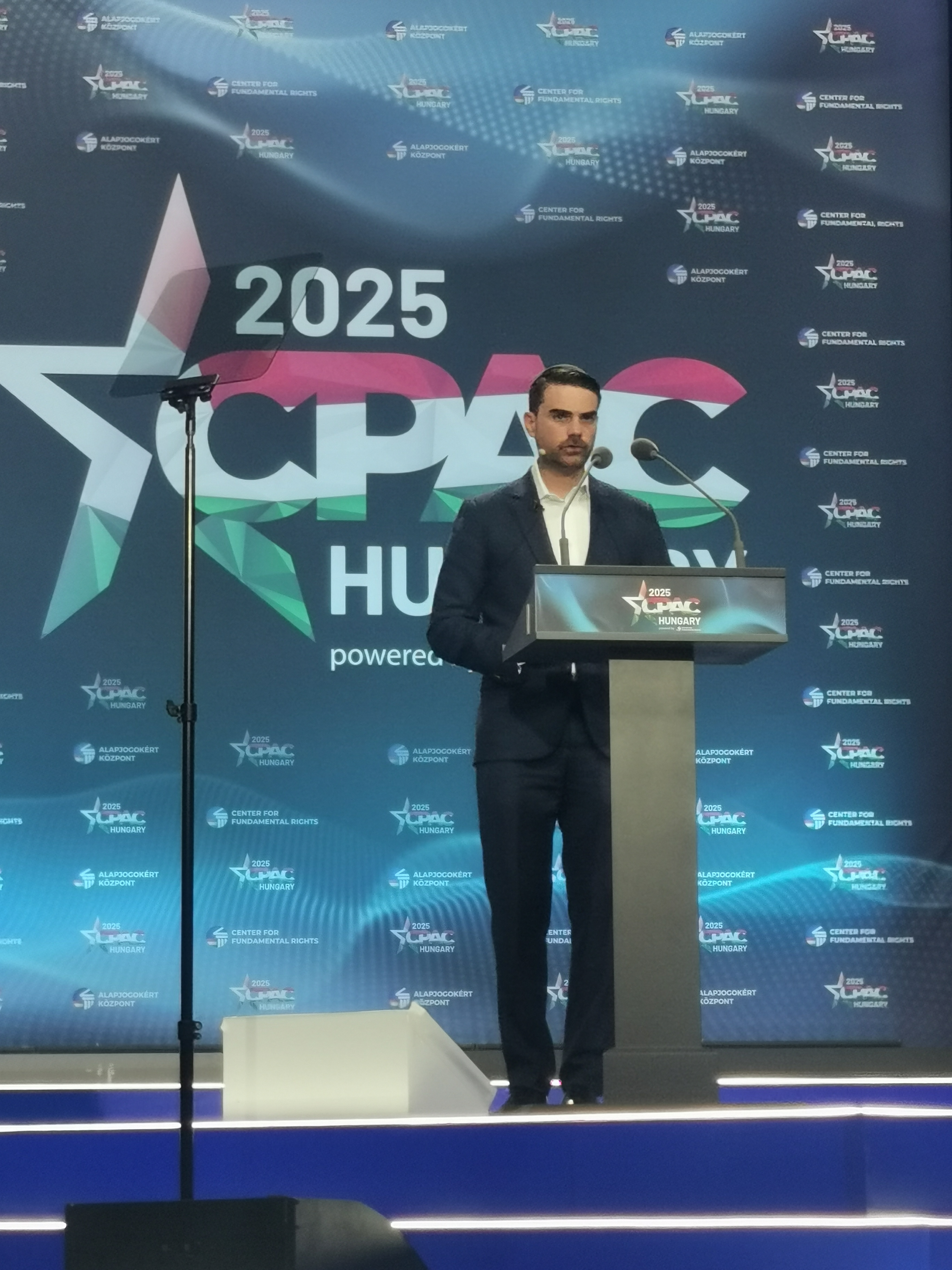
Shapiro speaking at CPAC Hungary 2025

On October 7, 2013, Shapiro and business partner Jeremy Boreing co-founded the U.S. media criticism website TruthRevolt with funding from the David Horowitz Freedom Center. TruthRevolt ceased operations in March 2018.

On January 14, 2021, Shapiro was featured as a guest writer for Politico's Playbook newsletter, where he defended House Republicans who opposed the second impeachment of Donald Trump. The newsletter drew immense backlash from many Politico staffers, some of whom argued that Shapiro should not have been allowed to write the article. Matthew Kaminski, editor-in-chief of Politico, refused to apologize and defended the decision to enable Shapiro to write the article, stating, "We're not going to back away from having published something because some people think it was a mistake to do so." According to the Daily Beast, more than 100 Politico staffers signed on to a letter to publisher Robert Allbritton criticizing both Politico's decision to feature Shapiro's article and the response from Kaminski.

On January 26, 2024, he appeared alongside artist Tom MacDonald in the music video for MacDonald's rap song "Facts", on which Shapiro is featured. The song held the No. 1 spot on Apple Music in late January and early February 2024. On February 5, 2024, the song debuted at No. 16 on the Billboard Hot 100. Concurrent to his feature in MacDonald's song, Shapiro and his father co-produced We Will Rise, a musical about the Warsaw Ghetto Uprising. It ran in Israel from October to December 2024. In 2025, Shapiro was honored as one of the torchbearers in the national Israeli Independence Day ceremony.

Shapiro wrote and produced The Daily Wire psychological historical drama film, Confession, released in November 2026 in the United States.

== Views ==
In 2012, Zman Magazine hailed Shapiro as a "rising star in America's conservative movement". In 2016, Shapiro described himself as "basically a libertarian". In 2021, he described himself as "generally libertarian" with regard to the role of the government and as a conservative with regard to the role of social structures. The New Yorker, Haaretz and Vox have described Shapiro as "right-wing". Shapiro's views have been described by The New York Times as "extremely conservative". The Economist labeled him as a "radical conservative" and as a "classically religious-conservative".

A 2020 study News, Nationalism, and Hegemony: The Formation of Consistent Issue Framing Throughout the U.S. Political Right examining issue framing by right-wing podcasts used The Ben Shapiro Show as an example which "offered a mainstream conservative perspective that favors President Donald Trump and his framing on issues like 'nationalism'" in a two-by-two matrix that also examined a Stormfront podcast, an alt-right podcast, and the Daily Standard podcast; the study argued that Shapiro's rhetoric was similar to that used in the Stormfront podcast, though with a different tone.

Shapiro has described the political left as believing in an imaginary "hierarchy of victimhood" in which the opinions of members of persecuted groups like the LGBT community are afforded more credence. He has argued that the left has dominated American culture through popular entertainment, media, and academia in a way that has made conservatives feel disenfranchised and helped lead to the election of Donald Trump in 2016. Shapiro has stated that "political correctness breeds insanity". He is an outspoken opponent of safe spaces, especially those on college campuses, arguing that they go against free speech. Shapiro frequently praises Western culture and Western civilization, saying "I believe Western civilization is superior to other civilizations."

=== Abortion ===
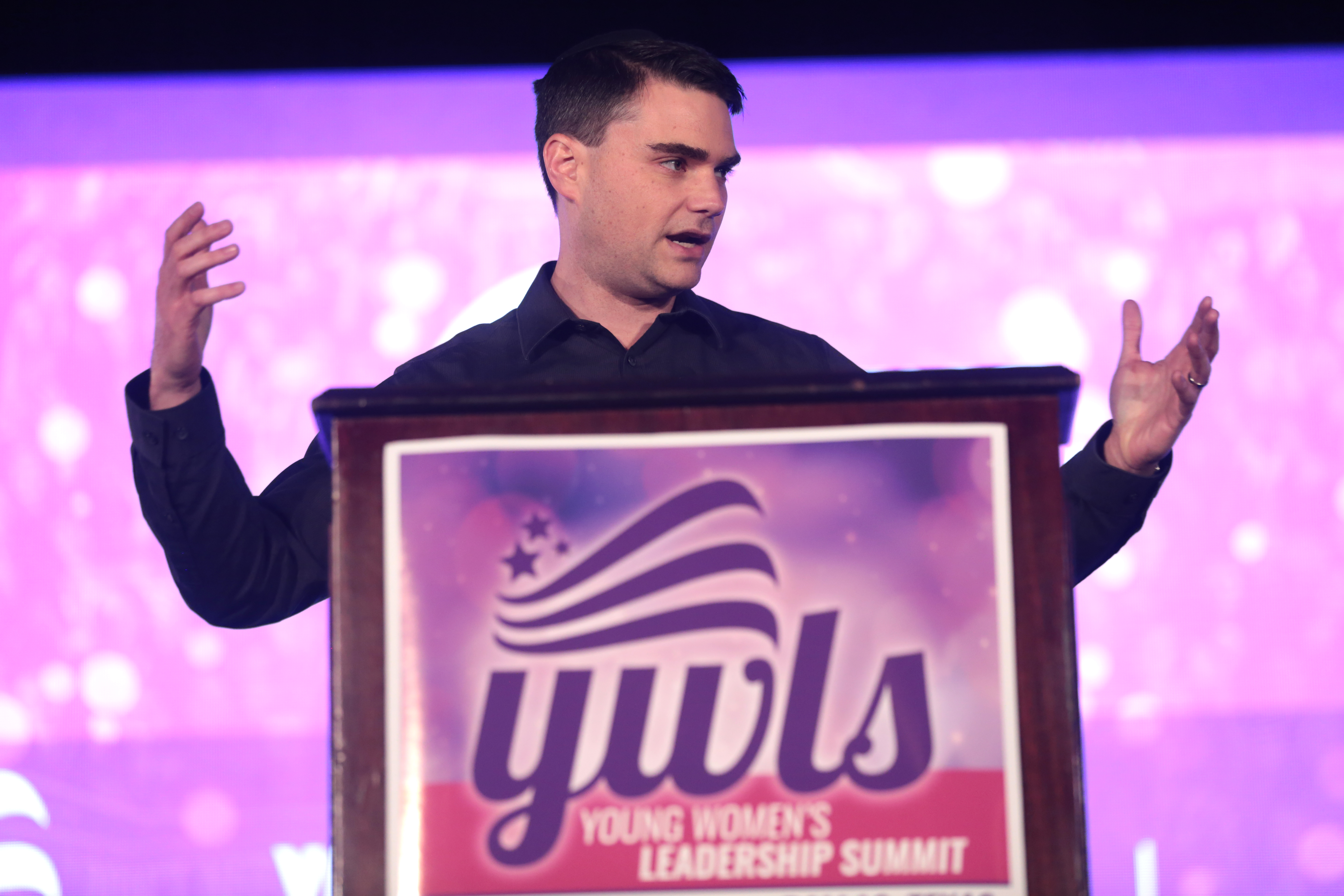
Shapiro speaking at the 2018 Young Women's Leadership Summit in Dallas, Texas

Shapiro supports a ban on abortion, including in cases of rape and incest, with one exception: when competent medical authority determines that the life of the mother is in jeopardy as a result of the pregnancy. He has further clarified that this includes extreme cases of mental illness where the life of the mother is at risk due to suicide. He also believes that doctors who perform abortions should be prosecuted. He has referred to women who have abortions as "baby killers". In 2019, Shapiro said that "the Supreme Court overturning Roe v. Wade" was "not going to happen", and added that he had "serious doubts" about "whether the Supreme Court, as currently constituted, would vote to overturn Roe v. Wade". (Roe v. Wade was later overturned by Dobbs v. Jackson Women's Health Organization in 2022.)

In 2019, Shapiro spoke at the annual March for Life in Washington, D.C., where he said abortion is a "violent act".

=== Alt-right ===
Shapiro is a critic of the alt-right movement, stating in 2017, "It is a garbage movement composed of garbage ideas. It has nothing to do with constitutional conservatism." In 2019, Shapiro criticized weekly newspaper The Economist for describing him as "alt-right" in their interview with him; in response, The Economist issued an apology and modified the article title to instead describe Shapiro as a "radical conservative".

Shapiro has been a target of online harassment and antisemitic threats from the alt-right. After leaving Breitbart News, Shapiro was a frequent target of antisemitic rhetoric from the alt-right. According to a 2016 analysis by the Anti-Defamation League, Shapiro was the most frequent target of antisemitic tweets against journalists.

=== Capital punishment ===
Shapiro is an advocate of capital punishment and "strongly" supports it remaining legal in the United States. Explaining his beliefs, Shapiro has stated that, "You can forfeit the right to life if you take another life, just as you can forfeit your right to liberty (this is called prison) by infringing on the liberty of another".

=== Climate change ===
Shapiro has acknowledged climate change as a legitimate phenomenon, although he has questioned "what percentage of global warming is attributable to human activity." In relation to concerns over increased flooding of coastal property from sea-level rise as a result of climate change, Shapiro stated, "You think people aren't just going to sell their homes and move?" Writing for GQ, in response to that remark, Jay Willis adds, "The possibility that no market will exist for property that is literally underneath the ocean seems not to have occurred to him." In an opinion piece on the 2020 California wildfires, Shapiro argued that state policies had contributed more to the severity of the fires than climate change. In response, Scientific American accused Shapiro of promoting climate change denial.

In 2021, he stated that a global temperature increase over the next century of 4 °C (7.2 °F) did not amount to an emergency, and that describing it as one was "purely a political designation". Shapiro's comment was mocked on social media, and an article in The Independent quoted the United Nations, NASA, and the Intergovernmental Panel on Climate Change, each of which rejected the idea that a 4 °C (7.2 °F) increase would not amount to an emergency.

=== Donald Trump ===
In the spring of 2016, Shapiro wrote an article for the Daily Wire in which he stated he would "never vote for Donald Trump". Shapiro supported Ted Cruz in the 2016 presidential election and opposed Trump's candidacy. In August 2016, Shapiro wrote an article for the Daily Wire arguing that Trump, if elected, would not appoint conservative justices to the Supreme Court. He described Steve Bannon as a "bully" who "sold out Breitbart founder Andrew Breitbart's mission in order to back another bully, Donald Trump." Shapiro has stated that Trump's victory in the 2016 election was more of a vote against Hillary Clinton than a vote in favor of Trump.

Shapiro supported the Trump administration's ordering of the killing of Qasem Soleimani, recognizing Jerusalem as the capital of Israel, as well as the nominations of Brett Kavanaugh and Neil Gorsuch to the Supreme Court. Shapiro also supported Trump withdrawing from the Paris Agreement, cutting regulations, and his nomination of 12 appellate court judges. However, Shapiro criticized Trump for firing James Comey, for appointing Michael Flynn and Steve Bannon, and for endorsing Roy Moore.

On October 19, 2020, Shapiro announced that he would be voting for Trump in the 2020 presidential election: "There are three reasons I'm going to vote for Donald Trump in 2020 when I didn't four years ago: First, I was simply wrong about Donald Trump on policy. Second, I wasn't really wrong about Donald Trump on character, but whatever damage he was going to do has already been done, and it's not going to help if I don't vote for him this time. And third, and most importantly: The Democrats have lost their fucking minds." He rebuked Trump on election night, November 3, 2020, when Trump prematurely claimed himself the winner when neither he nor his opponent Joe Biden had yet reached the 270 electoral votes required to win the presidency. He tweeted: "No, Trump has not already won the election, and it is deeply irresponsible for him to say he has." Shapiro denounced the false claim that Trump was the legitimate winner of the 2020 election. He criticized the January 6 Capitol attack whilst also criticizing the Democratic Party's response to it. In 2024, during 2024 Republican primaries, Shapiro favored Florida governor Ron DeSantis over Trump but later supported Trump after DeSantis dropped out of the primary. Shapiro also later helped host a fundraiser for Trump. In October 2024, Shapiro interviewed Trump on his show.

=== Economics and social security ===
In March 2024, Shapiro attracted criticism when he stated on his show that "No one in the United States should be retiring at 65 years old. Frankly, I think retirement itself is a stupid idea unless you have some sort of health problem."

Shapiro has backed privatizing Social Security, and for lowering taxes on the very wealthy. In August 2022, Shapiro argued that "Marxism can't work in America", saying this was because of "high levels of societal income mobility".

=== Facebook ===
In 2018, Shapiro argued that Facebook was targeting conservative sites after the platform implemented an algorithm change, limiting their traffic, and that they are not transparent enough. In 2021, an article in NPR revealed that, under Shapiro's leadership, the Daily Wire had dominated Facebook news feeds and received more engagement than any other news outlet "by a wide margin".

=== LGBTQ issues ===
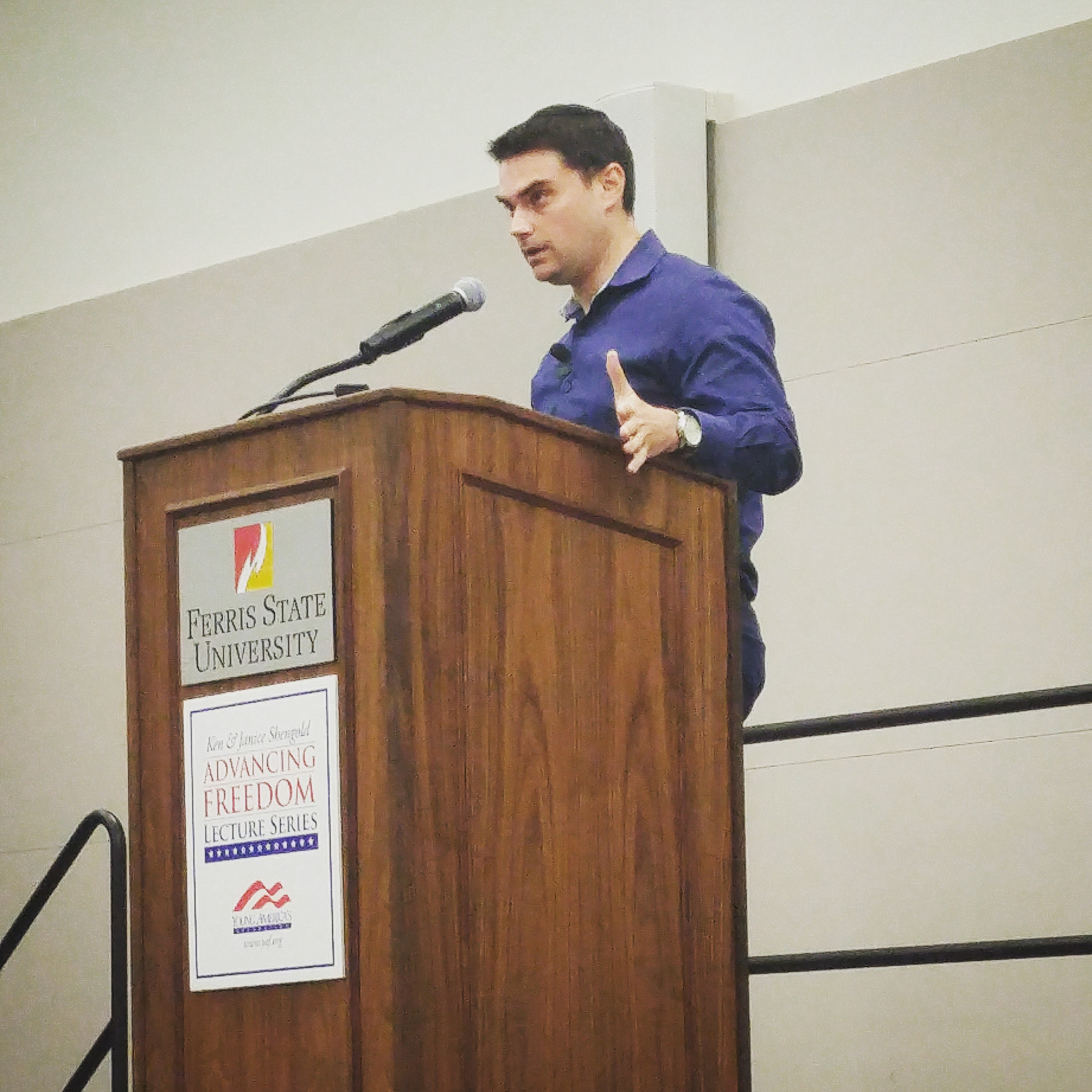
Shapiro debating at the Ferris State University in 2017, where he said "You can't magically change your gender. You can't magically change your sex. You can't magically change your age."

In 2010, Shapiro argued that homosexuality should not have been removed as a mental illness from the DSM. In 2014, Shapiro argued that the United States "is not a country that discriminates against homosexuals" and that "there is a vastly minute amount of discrimination against gays in this country."

Shapiro opposed the 2015 Obergefell v. Hodges Supreme Court ruling that deemed bans of same-sex marriage unconstitutional. However, he opposes government involvement in marriage, saying, "I think the government stinks at this", and expressing concern that because of the ruling in Obergefell v. Hodges, at some point the government may try to force religious institutions to perform same-sex weddings against their will. According to Slate's Seth Stevenson, Shapiro has described homosexuality as a sin. Shapiro also opposes same-sex couples raising children. He has said that "a man and a woman do a better job of raising a child than two men or two women". Shapiro opposes same-sex marriage being covered in school classrooms.

Shapiro believes transgender people suffer from mental illness. He has commented, "You can't magically change your gender. You can't magically change your sex." He compared such changes to the notion of changing one's age or identifying as an animal.

In 2019, in response to 2020 Democratic Party presidential candidate Beto O'Rourke calling for the removal of the tax-exempt status of religious institutions opposed to same-sex marriage, Shapiro said that if O'Rourke was going to try to "indoctrinate" his children in religious schools, Shapiro would be forced to either "leave the country" or "pick up a gun."

=== Gun ownership ===
Following the December 2012 Sandy Hook Elementary School shooting, Shapiro appeared on CNN's Piers Morgan Tonight on January 10, 2013. On the issue of gun control, Shapiro called Piers Morgan a "bully" who "tends to demonize people who differ from you politically by standing on the graves of the children of Sandy Hook, saying they don't seem to care enough about the dead kids." Videos of the encounter quickly received millions of views and went viral.

Writing in October 2017, in the aftermath of the Las Vegas shooting, Shapiro argued that "banning all guns would be unwise as well as immoral", additionally Shapiro stated, "...here's the problem: Not a single gun law short of full-scale gun confiscation would have prevented Las Vegas or any of the other mass shootings we've seen. Furthermore, there is no correlation between states with high rates of gun ownership and states with high rates of gun homicide."

=== Healthcare ===
Shapiro has backed repealing the Affordable Care Act. In 2021, Shapiro said that he was in favor of the COVID-19 vaccine and that he was vaccinated, but is against COVID-19 vaccine mandates.

=== Israeli–Palestinian conflict ===
In 2003, Shapiro published a column on Townhall stating that Israel must be allowed to "transfer Palestinians and Israeli-Arabs from Judea, Samaria, Gaza and Israel proper." Citing expulsion of Germans after World War II as a precedent, Shapiro insisted that "expelling a hostile population is a commonly-used and generally effective way of preventing violent entanglements." In the same article, Shapiro said that "The ideology of the Palestinian population is indistinguishable from that of the terrorist leadership." Journalist Jeffrey Goldberg criticized Shapiro's comments as an example of his "fascist" views. Shapiro later reversed his view on the West Bank issue, saying it was "both inhumane and impractical".

In 2010, Shapiro said "Israelis like to build. Arabs like to bomb crap and live in open sewage". He later claimed that he had been talking about the Israeli and Arab leadership, as well as terrorist groups in Palestine.

In a 2008 Townhall opinion piece, Shapiro expressed support for Israel's settlement building in the occupied Palestinian territories in the West Bank.

In 2019, Shapiro said that Democratic congresswoman Ilhan Omar, whose comments about American support for Israel were accused of evoking antisemitic tropes, and the white supremacist San Diego shooter, hold "a lot of the same opinions about Jews".

During the 2021 Israel–Palestine crisis, Shapiro published an op-ed in The Marshall News Messenger in which he stated that the reason behind the conflict between Israel and Hamas is that "Israel exists, and Hamas wishes it didn't exist". Shapiro additionally stated that Hamas's rocket attacks "would entail an anti-Semitic genocide", adding that Hamas was spending "tens of millions of dollars in foreign aid" on building "terror tunnels and rocket capacity to strike at the Jews." Shapiro argued that Hamas was positioning its rockets in civilian areas, seeking to "force Israel to kill Palestinian civilians so Hamas can propagandize about supposed Israeli human rights atrocities." He stated that Hamas was killing not only Jews but also Israeli Arabs and foreign workers. He also criticized the media coverage of the crisis, labeling it as "absurd" and specifically criticized The New York Times for its opinion article featuring a Palestinian writer titled "The Myth of Coexistence in Israel". Shapiro stated that an image used in the article, a map of Israel, was "so bad that MSNBC, which used the image in 2015, had to retract it and admit it was factually incorrect."

In an October 2024 appearance co-sponsored by The Daily Wire and the Young American's Foundation at the University of California, Los Angeles, Shapiro was asked whether or not he'd condone the actions of the Israeli Defense Forces and Netanyahu-led Israeli government amidst the deaths of over 40,000 people during the ongoing Gaza war. He responded "I don't just condone [their] actions, I celebrate and laud them". In the same statement, he claimed that the Israeli government has gone through "such extraordinary efforts not to kill civilians" that they have managed to have "the best civilian-to-terrorist kill ratio in the history of urban warfare". Furthermore, he blamed the Palestinian casualties on Hamas, which he believes uses civilians as human shields. He did not address use of human shields by Israel.

=== Military policy ===
In a 2002 article, Shapiro wrote, "I am getting really sick of people who whine about 'civilian casualties'... when I see in the newspapers that civilians in Afghanistan or the West Bank were killed by American or Israeli troops, I don't really care". Shapiro declared that "One American soldier is worth far more than an Afghan civilian", accusing Afghan civilians of being "fundamentalist Muslims" who provide cover for terrorists or give them money. Shapiro later apologized for these comments, stating that the 2002 article was "just a bad piece, plain and simple, and something I wish I'd never written". He said that while he still partially agreed with his article's main point—"that we must calculate the risk to American services members when we design rules of engagement"—he "expressed [that point] in the worst possible way, and simplified the issue beyond the bounds of morality (particularly by doubting the civilian status of some civilians)".

Shapiro supported the 2003 invasion of Iraq, arguing that "China is a dictatorship. North Korea is a dictatorship. Saudi Arabia, Libya, Syria, Pakistan and Egypt are all dictatorships. We can't overthrow all of those regimes simply to free their citizens. We have to focus on those regimes that endanger American security."

=== Music ===
In 2009, he wrote an article titled "Rap Is Crap" and said "Rap isn't music. Music has three elements: melody, harmony, and rhythm. Rap is all rhythm, very little melody, and virtually no harmony." Throughout his career, he has criticized hip-hop music and culture numerous times. Despite this, he featured alongside artist Tom MacDonald in the rap song "Facts" in 2024.

=== Race ===
Shapiro has stated that, while African-Americans were historically victims of injustice in the United States, he does not believe in the existence of widespread systemic injustice today. In 2017, Shapiro stated that "the idea that black people in the United States are disproportionately poor because America is racist; that's just not true." Shapiro has dismissed the idea that the United States was founded on slavery and argued that America was founded in spite of slavery.

Shapiro was one of several conservative commentators condemning Representative Steve King (R-IA) after King's January 2019 comments in defense of the terms "white supremacy" and "white nationalism". Shapiro called for King to be censured, and supported King's 2020 primary challenger Randy Feenstra.

Shapiro has criticized Black Lives Matter and stated that "the Black Lives Matter movement did indeed begin with protests about police brutality but quickly morphed into broader debates over the validity of looting and rioting, tearing down historic statues, slavery reparations and defunding the police."

After police officer Derek Chauvin was convicted of the murder of George Floyd, on March 4, 2025, Shapiro launched a website urging President Trump to pardon Chauvin, though this would not cover Chauvin's conviction in state court for second-degree murder, for which he is serving a 22.5-year sentence.

=== Religion ===
Shapiro identifies as an orthodox Jew. He wears a yarmulke, the traditional Jewish skullcap. In a 2011 tweet, Shapiro claimed that Judaism is plagued by "Bad Jews" who "largely vote Democrat". The same year, he wrote an article titled "Jews in Name Only" in which he claimed "Jews who vote for Obama are, by and large, Jews In Name Only (JINOs)" and that such Jews "do not care about Israel" or that they "care about it less than abortion, gay marriage and global warming". During the 2016 presidential election, he wrote an article titled "No, It Doesn't Matter That Bernie Sanders Is Ethnically Jewish. He's a Jew In Name Only."

In October 2022, Shapiro condemned Kanye West's antisemitic comments, comparing them to propaganda in Nazi Germany. He also called West "unstable".

In a 2014 YouTube video entitled "The Myth of the Tiny Radical Muslim Minority", Shapiro said, "We're above 800 million Muslims who are radicalized – more than half the Muslims on earth. That's not a minority... the myth of the tiny radical Muslim minority is just that: it's a myth". PolitiFact and Channel 4 News in the UK rejected his methodology, arguing that support for Sharia law was not sufficient to label an individual a "radical Muslim", and that "The meaning of Sharia law varies from sect to sect and nation to nation."

In the 2017 Quebec City mosque shooting, six Muslims were killed by Alexandre Bissonnette. Police presented evidence that Bissonnette checked Shapiro's Twitter feed 93 times in the month leading up to the shooting. Shapiro condemned the attack and said he did not incite the shooting.

== Personal life ==
Shapiro married Mor Toledano, an Israeli medical doctor of Moroccan Jewish descent, on July 8, 2008, in a traditional Jewish ceremony in Acre, Israel. Shapiro's wife earned her M.D. from the UCLA David Geffen School of Medicine. The couple have three daughters and two sons. They practice Orthodox Judaism.

In 2020, Shapiro announced that he and his family were leaving California. He relocated headquarters of The Daily Wire to Nashville, Tennessee, while he and his family resettled in South Florida.

Shapiro is the cousin of actress Mara Wilson. According to a 2025 article in The Hollywood Reporter, he has stated that the two have not spoken in years, and that their political beliefs do not align.

== Bibliography ==
- Brainwashed: How Universities Indoctrinate America's Youth (2004)
- Porn Generation: How Social Liberalism Is Corrupting Our Future (2005)
- Project President: Bad Hair and Botox on the Road to the White House (2008)
- Primetime Propaganda: The True Hollywood Story of How the Left Took Over Your TV (2011)
- Bullies: How the Left's Culture of Fear and Intimidation Silences America (2013)
- The People vs. Barack Obama: The Criminal Case Against the Obama Administration (2014)
- A Moral Universe Torn Apart (2014)
- What's Fair and Other Short Stories (2015)
- True Allegiance (2017)
- Say It's So: Papa, Dad, Me and 2005 White Sox Championship Season (2017)
- The Right Side of History: How Reason and Moral Purpose Made the West Great (2019)
- Facts Don't Care about Your Feelings (2019)
- How to Destroy America in Three Easy Steps (2020)
- Catastrophic Thinking (2020)
- Facts (Still) Don't Care About Your Feelings (2020)
- The Authoritarian Moment: How the Left Weaponized America's Institutions Against Dissent (2021)
- Lions and Scavengers: The True Story of America (and Her Critics) (2025)

== See also ==
- Intellectual dark web – A loose collection of public personalities of which Shapiro is often cited as an example
- List of American conservatives
- List of Harvard Law School alumni
- List of Jewish American jurists
- List of Phi Beta Kappa members by year of admission
- List of Republicans who opposed the Donald Trump 2016 presidential campaign
- List of syndicated columnists
- Owning the libs – Strategy of American conservatives
