= Wilson Casey =

American journalist (born 1954)

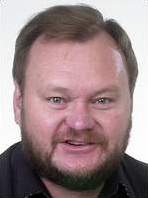
"TrivGuy" Wilson Casey

Wilson Casey (born 1954) is an American columnist, book author, political humorist, entertainer, speaker, and record holder. He earned two Guinness World Records (trivia marathon and radio broadcasting) for a thirty-hour live, continuous broadcast on radio station WKDY-AM on January 9–10, 1999 in Spartanburg, South Carolina. During the 30 hours he asked and identified the correct answer to 3,333 questions. Casey is regularly called and labeled "The Trivia Guy".

Casey was born in Woodruff, South Carolina in 1954. He was elected into the Woodruff High School Athletic Hall of Fame for Tennis in 1991. Casey received a B.S. degree in education from the University of South Carolina - Spartanburg (now USC - Upstate) in 1977 of which he was twice MVP on its varsity tennis team. He was the first tennis scholarship player at the school, though unofficially (Casey was awarded a work-study grant with the unwritten understanding that he'd play on the tennis team). From 1984 - 1991, he played in the amateur USTA tennis leagues and was a player on 7 state championship teams for the State of South Carolina, was on 3 sectional (Southern) championship teams, and went to 3 national championships (Las Vegas, NV; Tucson, AZ; and Seabrook Island, SC). He did this as a player with the Bushwhackers, a team from Spartanburg, SC, at 4 different playing levels (3.5, 4.0, 4.5, and 5.0), of which he was twice team captain.

His weekly Bible Trivia column appears in over 125 newspapers in the United States and is nationally distributed by King Features Syndicate, and his 7-day-a-week General Trivia column has appeared in numerous others including the Albuquerque (NM) Journal, the Hendersonville (NC) Times-News, the Providence (RI) Journal, the Santa Rosa (CA) Press Democrat, the Spartanburg (SC) Herald Journal, the Tacoma (WA) News Tribune, and the Wilmington (NC) Star-News. The General Trivia column began in the Spartanburg, SC paper on September 16, 2000 and is still running continuously 7x/wk 365 days/yr. Casey has created over 4,000 different trivia columns including daily and weekly versions that have appeared, and are appearing in over 500 newspapers across North America.

Casey hosted the "Trivia Fun" radio program on WKDY am 1400 radio for six years in the late 1990s and early 2000s. The program was consistently a top rated program in the Spartanburg, South Carolina, market during the 12 -1 pm "noon hour," fielding hundreds of calls every day. Before that he was a regular "trivia-asking" guest on WSPA-AM 950 for sixteen years. His radio career spanned 22 years of being an on-air personality, and he earned a Guinness World Record in radio broadcasting (trivia marathon).

Casey has appeared as a celebrity contestant (world record holders' segment) on the national NBC-TV game show The Weakest Link with hostess Anne Robinson. He lasted 37 minutes (until voted off by fellow contestants) on the hour-long show that aired nationally for the first time on November 26, 2002 (It is still seen in re-runs on GSN, the Gameshow Network). Casey was guaranteed $10,000 for appearing, which NBC-TV would donate to his favorite charity. He chose to have the entire amount donated to the Christian Life Center for youth athletic programs at Trinity United Methodist Church in Spartanburg, SC. Casey was also in a movie documentary (2009) as one of the world's most unusual Guinness record holders (Chump-Change Productions, Chicago, IL). He has twice been a featured guest on TV's "Your Carolina with Jack & Kimberly".

A national speaker, he also emcees celebrity roasts, hosts live stand-up trivia nights, and is a political humorist entertainer for groups.

The State of South Carolina General Assembly has honored Casey with a Concurrent Resolution. He is also listed as a National Figure from upstate South Carolina and has a trivia fan website. Complete listings (52 versions) of various published works may be found at his amazon author page, many in addition, to below bibliography.

== Bibliography ==
- Golf Trivia 2012 Daily Boxed Calendar (2011) ISBN 978-1-4162-8836-7, Sellers Publishing
- The Cigar Diet! How I Lost 50 Pounds w/o the "D" Word! (2011) ASIN: B0050OXN3W, Amazon Kindle
- UFO-A-Day: Project Black Book (UFO Mystery SOLVED) Vol II (2011) ASIN: B0050OXLRU, Amazon Kindle
- UFO Terms/Phrases: Project Black Book (UFO Mystery SOLVED) Vol I (2011) ASIN: B0050OXIM8, Amazon Kindle
- Golf Trivia 2011 Daily Boxed Calendar (2010) ISBN 978-1-4162-8640-0, Sellers Publishing
- Firsts: Origins of Everyday Things That Changed the World (2009) ISBN 978-1-59257-924-2, Alpha/Penguin Group
- Know It or Not? Vol. 1 (2009) ISBN 1-59393-327-4, BearManor Media
- Trivia! 'Cause You Can't Take 200 Papers to the Bathroom (2008) ISBN 1-59393-137-9, BearManor Media
- Do You Know Your Bible? A Fun Quiz on the Good Book (2007) ISBN 1-4022-0884-7, SourceBooks
- 2008 Bible Trivia Calendar (2007) ISBN 1-4022-0938-X, SourceBooks
- TV Trivia Teasers: 1004 Totally Tubular Brain-Twisters and a Titillating Talking-Head "Photo Teaser" Test (1984) ISBN 0-87650-164-1, Perian Press/Popular Culture Ink
