= Columnist =

Person who writes for publication in a series

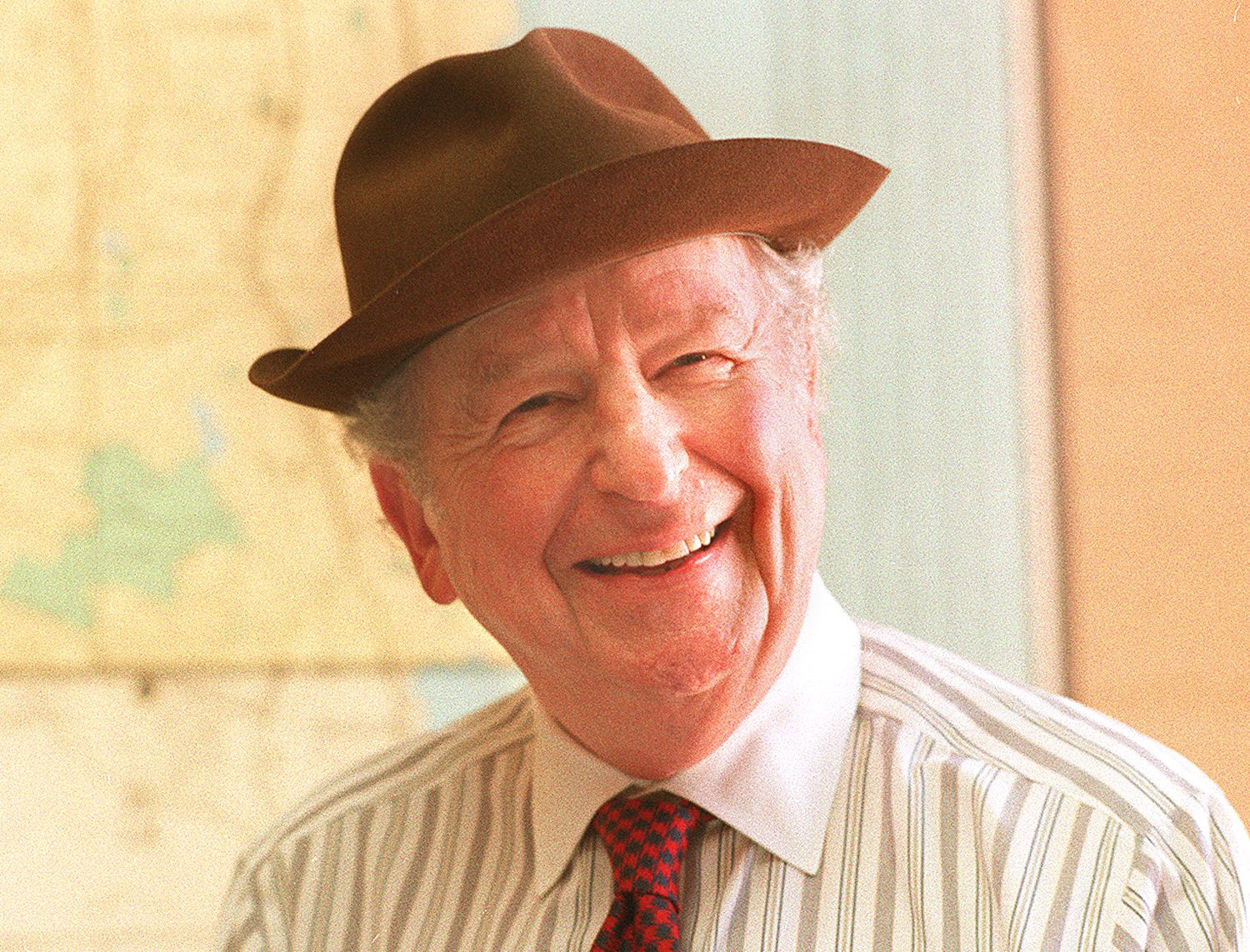
- Herb Caen, who was one of the most renowned columnists in the U.S.

Occupation
- Names: Reporter; writer; journalist
- Occupation type: Profession
- Activity sectors: Mass media; entertainment; newspaper

Description
- Competencies: Communication; responsibility
- Fields of employment: Mass media; newspaper; magazine; broadcasting
- Related jobs: Editor; reporter; writer

A columnist (/ˈkɒləm(n)ɪst/) is a person who writes for publication in a series, creating an article that usually offers commentary and opinions. Columns appear in newspapers, magazines and other publications, including blogs. They take the form of a short essay by a specific writer who offers a personal point of view. Columns are sometimes written by a composite or a team, appearing under a pseudonym, or (in effect) a brand name. Columnists typically write daily or weekly columns. Some columns are later collected and reprinted in book form.

== Radio and television ==
Newspaper columnists of the 1930s and 1940s, such as Franklin Pierce Adams (also known as FPA), Nick Kenny, John Crosby, Jimmie Fidler, Louella Parsons, Drew Pearson, Ed Sullivan and Walter Winchell, achieved a celebrity status and used their syndicated columns as a springboard to move into radio and television. In some cases, such as Winchell and Parsons, their radio programs were quite similar in format to their newspaper columns. Rona Barrett began as a Hollywood gossip columnist in 1957, duplicating her print tactics on television by the mid-1960s. One of the more famous syndicated columnists of the 1920s and 1930s, O. O. McIntyre, declined offers to do a radio series because he felt it would interfere and diminish the quality of writing in his column, "New York Day by Day".

== Books ==
Franklin Pierce Adams and O. O. McIntyre both collected their columns into a series of books, as did other columnists. McIntyre's book, The Big Town: New York Day by Day (1935) was a bestseller. Adams' The Melancholy Lute (1936) is a collection of selections from three decades of his columns. H. Allen Smith's first humor book, Low Man on a Totem Pole (1941), and his two following books, were so popular during World War II that they kept Smith on the New York Herald Tribune's Best Seller List for 100 weeks and prompted a collection of all three in 3 Smiths in the Wind (1946). When Smith's column, The Totem Pole, was syndicated by United Features, he told Time:

Just between you and me, it's tough. A typewriter can be a pretty formidable contraption when you sit down in front of it and say: "All right, now I'm going to be funny."

The writing of French humor columnist Alain Rémond has been collected in books. The Miami Herald promoted humor columnist Dave Barry with this description: "Dave Barry has been at The Miami Herald since 1983. A Pulitzer Prize winner for commentary, he writes about issues ranging from the international economy to exploding toilets." Barry has collected his columns into a series of successful books. He stopped writing his nationally syndicated weekly column in 2005, and the Miami Herald now offers on its website a lengthy selection of past columns by Barry.

In 1950, Editor & Publisher looked back at the newspaper columnists of the 1920s:

"Feature service of various sorts is new", Hallam Walker Davis wrote in a book, The Column, which was published in 1926. "It has had the advantage of high-powered promotion. It is still riding on the crest of the first big wave its own splash sent out." But Mr. Davis did think that in a decade or two the newspapers might be promoting their columns along with their comic strips. The World had started the ball rolling with billboard advertising of Heywood Broun's "It Seems to Me". The McNaught Syndicate was sitting pretty with O. O. McIntyre, Will Rogers and Irvin S. Cobb on its list. The New York Herald Tribune offered Don Marquis and Franklin P. Adams rhymed satirically in "The Conning Tower" for the New York World Syndicate. "A Line o' Type or Two", Bert Leston Taylor's verse column in the Chicago Tribune, was now being done by Richard Henry Little. Other offerings: humorous sketches by Damon Runyon; O. Henry stories; editorials by Arthur Brisbane; Ring Lardner letter; "Rippling Rhymes", by Walt Mason; literary articles by H. L. Mencken.

== Newspaper and magazine ==
In certain instances, a column can prove so popular it becomes the basis for an expansion into an entire magazine. For instance, when Cyrus Curtis founded the Tribune and Farmer in 1879, it was a four-page weekly with an annual subscription rate of 50 cents. He introduced a women's column by his wife, Louise Knapp Curtis, and it proved so popular that in 1883 he started publishing it as a separate monthly supplement, Ladies Journal and Practical Housekeeper, edited by Louise Curtis. With 25,000 subscribers by the end of its first year, it was such a success that Curtis sold Tribune and Farmer to put his energy into the new publication, which became the Ladies' Home Journal.

There is sometimes crossover between being a politician and a columnist. For example, Boris Johnson had a column in the Daily Telegraph, was elected a member of the UK Parliament, became Mayor of London then UK Prime Minister, then became a columnist for the Daily Mail on being forced out of office.

Carl Rowan was a famous black columnist who wrote for The Mineapollis Tribune. His articles about racism and international affairs made him famous across the USA. In 1961, he was asked by the president John F. Kennedy to join his administration. He then became a Deputy Assistant Secretary of Public Affairs. That was all made possible due to his interview with Mr. Kennedy that happened year before.

In pop culture the profession of 'columnist' has been seen as glamorous, and is often used as the career of choice for fictional characters such as Carrie Bradshaw in Sex and the City, Rory Gilmore in Gilmore Girls, Andie Anderson in How To Lose A Guy In 10 Days and dozens of others.

== Events ==
National day of Columnists is on April 18.

== Types ==
- Advice columnist
- Critic
- Editorial opinion columnist
- Gossip columnist
- Humor columnist
- Food columnist

== See also ==
- List of newspaper columnists
- List of syndicated columnists
