= Wendie Malick =

American actress (born 1950)

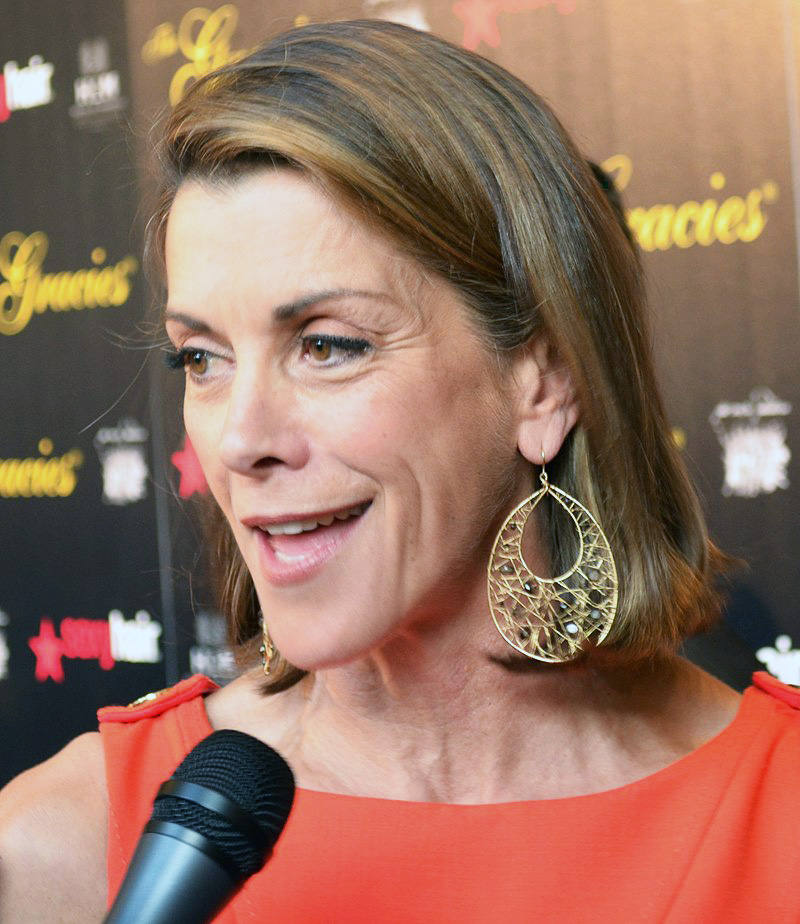
- Malick at the 2012 Gracie Awards
- Born: December 13, 1950 (age 75); Buffalo, New York, U.S.
- Education: Ohio Wesleyan University (BA)
- Occupations: Actress; model
- Years active: 1978–present
- Spouses: Mitch Glazer (m. 1982; div. 1989) Richard Erickson (m. 1995)

Wendie Malick (born December 13, 1950) is an American actress and former fashion model, known for her roles in various television comedies. during her career, Malick has appeared in more than 200 films and television shows since the 1970s. She starred as Judith Tupper Stone in the HBO sitcom Dream On (1990–1996) and as Nina Van Horn in the NBC sitcom Just Shoot Me! (1997–2003), with the latter earning nominations for two Primetime Emmys and a Golden Globe Award.

From 2010 to 2015, Malick starred as Victoria Chase in the TV Land comedy series, Hot in Cleveland. She is also known for her recurring role as Gayle Buchannon on Baywatch (1989–1994) as well as Ronee Lawrence on the eleventh and final season of Frasier (1993–2004). Her film credits include Scrooged (1988), The American President (1995), Waiting... (2005), Confessions of a Shopaholic (2009) and About Fate (2022). In animation, she has voiced Burdine Maxwell in the first season of Bratz, Beatrice Horseman on the Netflix series BoJack Horseman and Eda Clawthorne on the Disney Channel series The Owl House. Her later television credits include recurring roles on American Housewife (2016–2021), The Ranch (2018–2020), Young Sheldon (2021–2024) and Shrinking (2023–2026), and the series regular roles on Rush Hour (2016), Night Court (2023–2025), and The Chicken Sisters (2023–2025).

== Early life and education ==
Wendie D. Malick was born on December 13, 1950, in Buffalo, New York, the daughter of Gigi, a former model, and Kenneth Malick (1920–2021), who worked in sales. Her paternal grandfather, Ayad Malick, was an Egyptian from a Coptic Christian family who met her grandmother Sarah Belle Float, a Pentecostal missionary, in 1913. Her other ancestry is French, German, and English. She graduated from Williamsville South High School in 1968. Malick is an alumna of the William Esper Studio for the performing arts in Manhattan, New York City.

== Career ==
=== Early career ===
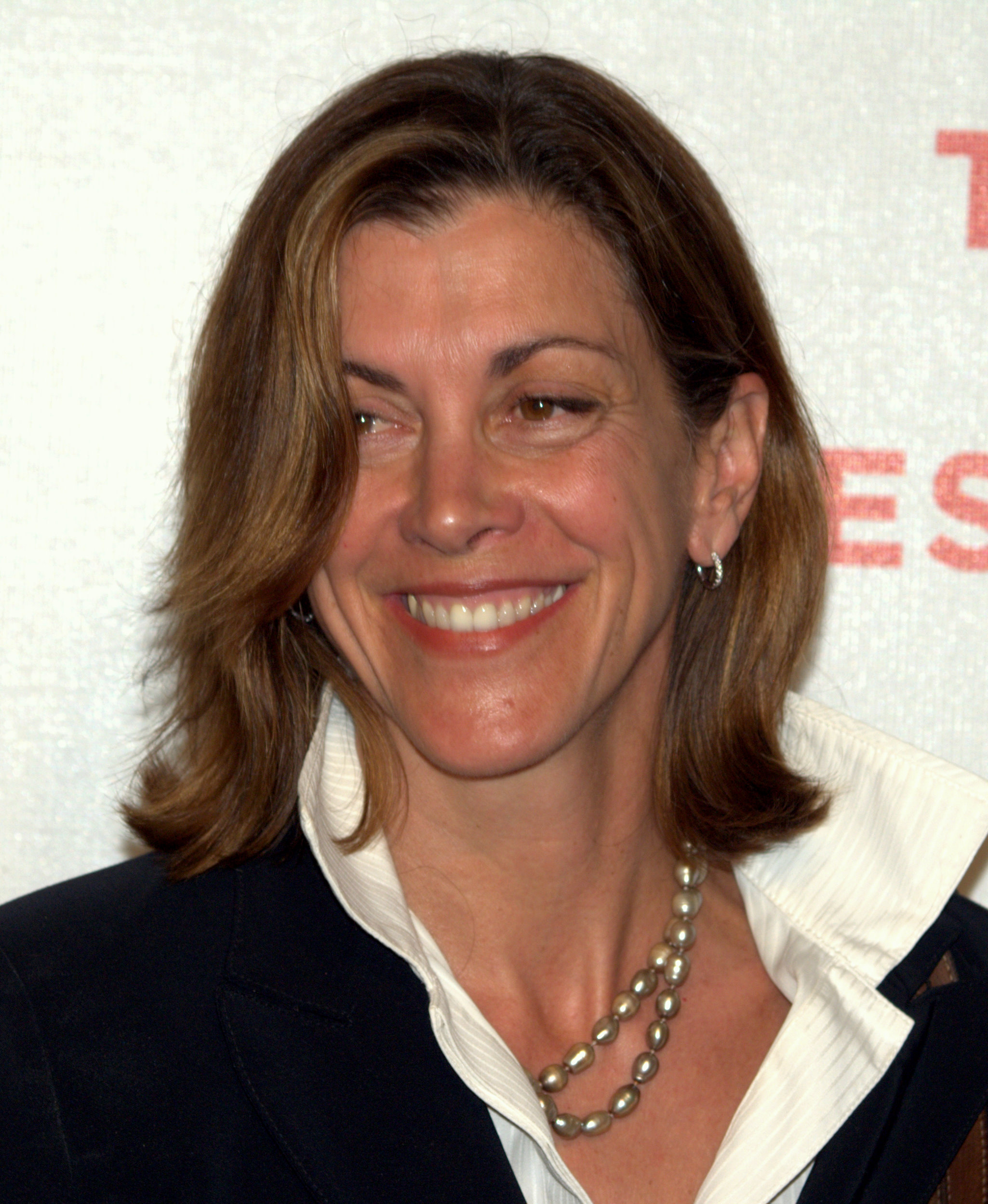
Wendie Malick posing at the 2009 Tribeca Film Festival

After graduating from Ohio Wesleyan University in Delaware, Ohio, in 1972, Malick began fashion modeling for the Wilhelmina modeling agency. She left to work for Republican Congressman Jack Kemp. She soon left Washington, D.C., to pursue a career on stage and screen. She began working as an actress appearing in the 1979 made-for-television romantic comedy film, How to Pick Up Girls! and later made appearances on the soap opera Love of Life and the comedy show Saturday Night Live. In 1982, she played supporting role in the romantic comedy film, A Little Sex. The same year, Malick auditioned for the role of Diane Chambers in the NBC sitcom Cheers,; Shelley Long was ultimately cast as Diane. She later was cast as one of lead characters of the ABC medical drama series Trauma Center. The series was cancelled after a single season. In 1984 she was featured in the pilot episode of ABC primetime soap opera, Paper Dolls and later guest-starred on Mike Hammer, Scarecrow and Mrs. King and Highway to Heaven. She also In 1986, Malick guest starred as Cecile's henchwoman in the 5,559th episode of Another World. In the late 1980s, Malick began her career in television comedies. She had a recurring role on Kate & Allie as Allie's ex-husband's new wife, and played a supporting role in the 1988 film Scrooged as Bill Murray's sister-in-law. In 1989 she starred as Gayle Buchannon, the sharp-tongued ex-wife of Mitch Buchannon (David Hasselhoff), in the Panic at Malibu Pier, a made-for-television movie and the pilot for the action series, Baywatch. She reprised her role in the series from 1989 to 1994 appearing total in six episodes.

=== Dream On and Just Shoot Me! ===
In 1990, Malick was cast in the HBO comedy series Dream On as Judith Tupper Stone, Brian Benben's neurotic but endearing ex-wife. She remained on this show until it ended in 1996, winning four CableACE Awards for Best Actress in a Comedy Series. During Dream On years, Malick also acted in other television series, appearing in dramas, such as MacGyver in 1991, NYPD Blue as a battered socialite in 1993, and L.A. Law and Tales from the Crypt, and sitcoms, including Mad About You, Seinfeld, and Cybill. She also appeared in several television films, including Dynasty: The Reunion (1991), Madonna: Innocence Lost (1994), Hart to Hart: Secrets of the Hart (1995), The Return of Hunter (1995), Apollo 11 (1996) and Perfect Body (1997). Malick starred in the 1999 Lifetime Television film Take My Advice: The Ann and Abby Story, in which she played the dual roles of identical twin sibling advice columnists Ann Landers (Eppie Lederer) and "Dear Abby" Abigail Van Buren (Pauline Phillips). In feature films, Malick appeared in the 1990 romantic comedy, Funny About Love, the 1991 biographical drama Bugsy, the 1995 Rob Reiner-directed comedy-drama The American President, and the 1997 romantic teen comedy Trojan War. As lead actress, she starred in the 1998 independent drama film Jerome.

In 1996, Malick starred as the lead character in her own comedy series, Good Company on CBS. The show was cancelled after only six episodes. In 1997, she began starring as Nina Van Horn, a shallow, boozing former supermodel on the NBC sitcom Just Shoot Me!. She continued in this role until the show ended in 2003. She received positive reviews for her performance.She was nominated for a Primetime Emmy Award for Outstanding Supporting Actress in a Comedy Series in 1999 and 2002, and a Golden Globe Award for Best Supporting Actress – Series, Miniseries or Television Film in 1999. She also guest-starred on The X-Files in 1998. She starred in Disney's animated film The Emperor's New Groove as Chicha in 2000 alongside her fellow Just Shoot Me co-star David Spade, who voices Emperor Kuzco. In 2000, Malick was honored by Women in Film as A Woman of Vision, along with Tipper Gore, Gwen Ifill, and Roseanne Barr.

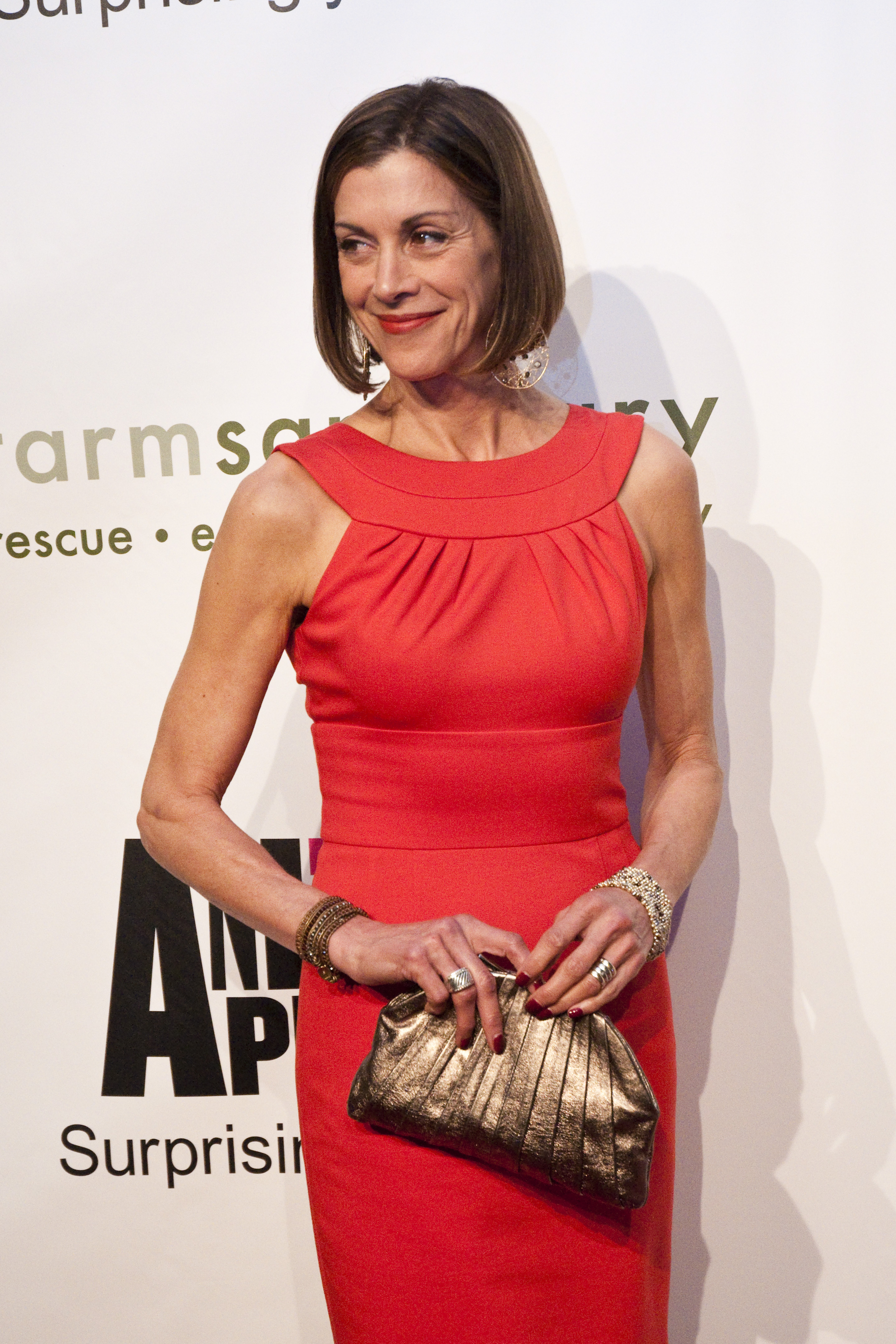
Malick at the Farm Sanctuary 25th Anniversary Gala in New York City on May 14, 2011

In 2003, Malick went to star in the pilot My Life with Men, an unaired ABC comedy pilot about a woman who lives with her ex husband and four sons. Later that year she joined the cast of Cheers spin-off Frasier, portraying Ronee Lawrence, a Seattle lounge singer and Frasier's (Kelsey Grammer) childhood babysitter who develops a relationship with Frasier's father, Martin Crane (John Mahoney). Eventually, her character married Martin in the series finale "Goodnight, Seattle". Malick and Mahoney also both appeared in 1995 film The American President. In 2002, she starred opposite Shirley Jones and Cloris Leachman in the comedy film Manna from Heaven. She provided the voice of Principal Folsom for the Disney animated series Fillmore! until its end in 2004. In 2005, she co-starred in the Nickelodeon animated series The X's as Mrs. X.

=== Later career and Hot in Cleveland ===
From 2005 to 2006, Malick starred opposite John Stamos in the ABC comedy series Jake in Progress. Malick was to be part of the cast of the series Modern Men, but due to a Jake in Progress renewal, her role on Modern Men was recast with Jane Seymour. Both Jake in Progress and Modern Men were cancelled in 2006. Also in 2005, Malick starred as Clara Dalrymple in the film Racing Stripes. In 2005 and 2006, she provided the voice of Burdine Maxwell in the animated series Bratz. In late 2006 and early 2007, she starred in another short-lived comedy series, Big Day on ABC. Starting in 2005, Malick did voice work on radio and television ads for Marshalls department stores. Malick guest-starred on CSI: Crime Scene Investigation and Law & Order in 2005. In film, she appeared in Waiting..., Adventureland, and Confessions of a Shopaholic as the instructor of the "Shopaholics Anonymous" group, Miss Korch.

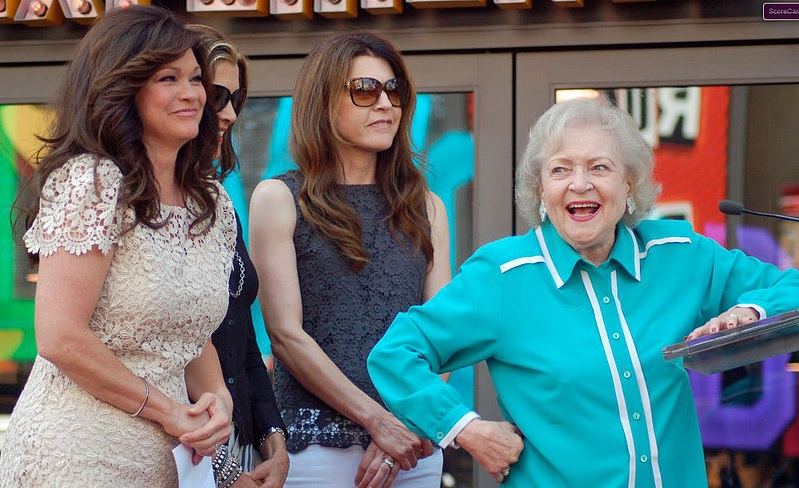
Valerie Bertinelli, Malick, Jane Leeves, and Betty White in August 2012

In 2010, Malick was cast as Victoria Chase, a five-time-divorced, Emmy Award-winning soap opera star, in the TV Land comedy series Hot in Cleveland, alongside Jane Leeves, Valerie Bertinelli, and Betty White. The series made ratings success for TV Land, and won generally favorable reviews from critics. In 2011, Malick was a promising contender for an Emmy Award in the Outstanding Lead Actress in a Comedy Series category, though she did not receive a nomination. In 2012, the Hot in Cleveland cast and she were nominated for a Screen Actors Guild Award for Outstanding Performance by an Ensemble in a Comedy Series. On November 17, 2014, TV Land announced season six would be the final season for the show.

In April 2011, Malick became the celebrity spokesperson for Budget Rent a Car in a series of online and television ads. Malick starred in the 2013 Hallmark original film After All These Years based on the book by best-selling author Susan Isaacs.

After Hot in Cleveland, Malick landed the role in the CBS action comedy-drama series Rush Hour, based on the film franchise of the same name. The series was cancelled after one season. Malick later joined the cast of Fox drama series Pitch in a recurring role as Maxine Armstrong. In 2016 she appeared as Sebastian Lund's (Rob Kerkovich) mother, Sylvia in the fourth episode of NCIS: New Orleans. From 2016 to 2021, she had a recurring role as Katy Mixon, the lead character's mother in the ABC comedy series, American Housewife. Malick also appeared on Mom, Grace and Frankie, This Is Us, Modern Family, and Physical.

From 2014 to 2020, Malick had a recurring voice role playing the titular character's mother Beatrice in the Netflix animated series BoJack Horseman. In 2018, she received Annie Awards nomination for her voice acting. From 2018 to 2020, she also had a recurring role as rancher Lisa Neumann on Netflix comedy series The Ranch. In 2020, she was cast as the voice of Eda Clawthorne on The Owl House.

Malick played Shailene Woodley's character mother in the 2019 romantic drama film Endings, Beginnings, and title role in the 2020 Lifetime thriller Deranged Granny. In 2022, she appeared in several features, include Mack & Rita starring Diane Keaton, A Little White Lie, The Re-Education of Molly Singer, and the leading role in the musical drama Mother of All Shows. As of 2023, she also played Dr. Julie Baram, Harrison Ford’s love interest on the Apple+ series Shrinking.

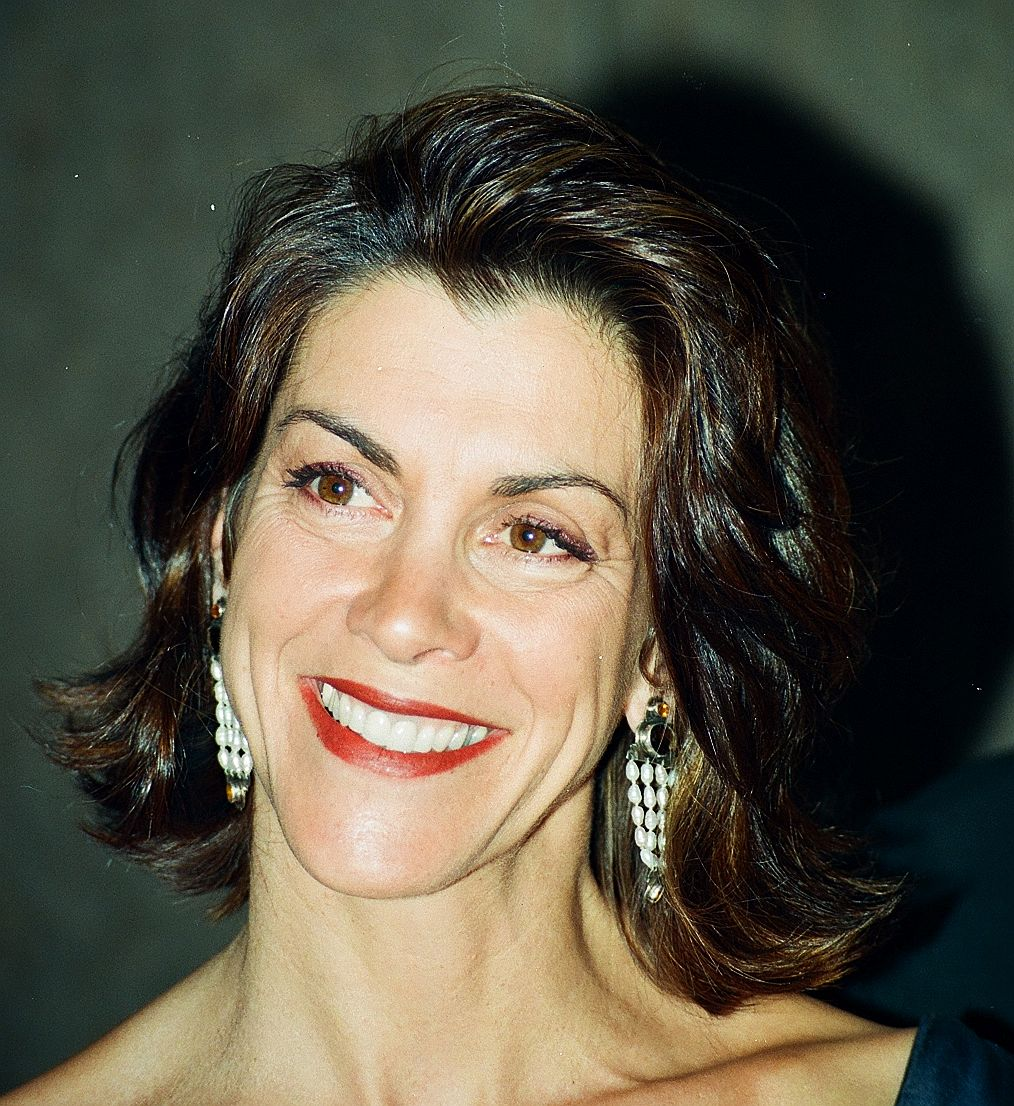
Malick in 1998

== Personal life ==
Malick has been married twice: from 1982 to 1989 to actor and screenwriter Mitch Glazer, and since 1995 to Richard Erickson. They live in Topanga, California, in the Santa Monica Mountains. Malick is a pescetarian. She donates to Democratic political candidates, organizations, and causes.

== Filmography ==
=== Film ===
Year	Title	Role	Notes
1978	How to Pick Up Girls	Stephie	
1979	Mr. Mike's Mondo Video	Herself	
1982	A Little Sex	Philomena	
1988	Scrooged	Wendie Cross	
1990	Funny About Love	Nurse Nancy	
1991	Bugsy	Inez Malick	
1995	The American President	Susan Sloan	
1996	Apollo 11	Pat Collins	
1997	Just Add Love	Charlotte	
1997	Trojan War	Beverly Kimble	
1997	North Shore Fish	Shimma	
1998	Divorce: A Contemporary Western	Terry	
1998	Jerome	Jane	
2000	The Emperor's New Groove	Chicha	Voice
2001	Cahoots	Diane	
2001	On Edge	Mildred Tilman	
2002	Manna from Heaven	Inez	
2003	Strange Frequency 2	Maggie	Segment: "Soul Man"
2004	Raising Genius	Nancy Nestor	
2004	Stuck	Virginia	Short film
2005	Racing Stripes	Clara Dalrymple	
2005	Waiting...	Nacy Mae Cross	
2005	Bratz: Rock Angelz	Burdine Maxwell	Voice
2005	Kronk's New Groove	Chicha	Voice
2006	Brother Bear 2	Aunt Siqiniq	Voice
2006	Bratz: Passion 4 Fashion – Diamondz	Burdine Maxwell	Voice
2008	Eavesdrop	Laura	
2008	Waiting for Yvette	Yvette	Short film
2009	Adventureland	Mrs. Annette Brennan	
2009	Confessions of a Shopaholic	Miss Korch	
2009	The Goods: Live Hard, Sell Hard	Tammy Selleck	
2009	Alvin and the Chipmunks: The Squeakquel	Dr. Rubin	
2010	Adventures of a Teenage Dragon Slayer	Vice-Principal Annie Metz	
2010	Knucklehead	Sister Francesca Romeo Dawson Knight	
2011	About Fifty	Kate	
2011	What Happens Next	Elise	
2012	Jewtopia	Marcy Marx	
2013	Scooby-Doo! and the Spooky Scarecrow	Sheriff Bessie Kern	Voice
2017	A Family for The Holidays	Margaret	
2018	Do You	Gloria	Short film
2019	Endings, Beginnings	Sue	
2020	Beautiful Dreamer	Rita	
2022	Mack & Rita	Angela	
2022	About Fate	Nancy	
2022	A Little White Lie	Dr. Bedrosian	
2023	The Re-Education of Molly Singer	Mrs. Zimmerman	
2023	Mother of All Shows	Rosa	
2023	7000 Miles	Meli Standish	Also producer
2024	Skincare	Colleen	

=== Television ===
Year	Title	Role	Notes
1980	Saturday Night Live	Spectator	Episode: "Elliott Gould/Kid Creole and the Coconuts"
1982	One of the Boys	Joan	Episode: "One of the Boys"
1983	Trauma Center	Dr. Brigitte Blaine	Series regular, 13 episodes
1984	Paper Dolls	Taylor	Episode: "Pilot"
1984	Mike Hammer	Louise Jordan	Episode: "Too Young to Die"
1985	Private Sessions	Tippi	Television film
1985–1989	Kate & Allie	Claire Lowell	Recurring role, 5 episodes
1986	Another World	Cecile's henchwoman	Episode 5559 – May 6, 1986
1986	Scarecrow and Mrs. King	Jennie Stetson	Episode: "Unfinished Business"
1987	Highway to Heaven	Donna Burke	Episode: "With love, the claus"
1988	Supercarrier	Dr. Susan Layden	Episode: "Deadly Enemies"
1988	The Highwayman		Episode: "The Hitchhiker"
1988	Hunter	Paula Banyon	Episode: "Boomerang"
1989	Anything But Love	Alice	2 episodes
1989	The Ed Begley Jr. Show	Carol Hobart	TV pilot
1989	Christine Cromwell	Trudy Baron	Episode: "Easy Come, Easy Go"
1989–1994	Baywatch	Gayle Buchannon	Recurring role, 7 episodes
1990–1996	Dream On	Judith Tupper Stone	Series regular, 119 episodes
1990–1991	The Fanelli Boys	Becky Goldblume	3 episodes
1991	MacGyver	Cindy Finnegan	Episode: "Obsessed"
1991	Dynasty: The Reunion	Carol Marshall	Television film
1992	Civil Wars	Claudia Bentel	Episode: "Dirty Pool"
1992	The Human Factor	Dr. Finnola Keefe	Episode: "Between the Sheets"
1993	NYPD Blue	Susan Wagner	2 episodes
1993	Family Album	Mrs. Gordon	Episode: "Winter, Spring, Summer or Fall All You Gotta Do Is Call"
1993	Love & War	Dr. Kelly	Episode: "I Got Plenty of Nothing"
1994	L.A. Law	Laura Schoen Russianoff	Episode: "Finish Line"
1994	The Commish	Nancy Lambert	Episode: "Nancy with the Laughing Face"
1994	Viper	Iris Nevelson	Episode: "Firehawk"
1994	Mad About You	Carol	Episode: "The Ride Home"
1994	Empty Nest	Denise	Episode: "Absence Makes the Nurse Grow Weirder"
1994	Tales from the Crypt	Rita	Episode: "In the Groove"
1994	Madonna: Innocence Lost	Camille Barbone	Television film
1995	Hart to Hart: Secrets of the Hart	Sarah Powell	Television film
1995	The Return of Hunter	Pat Lafferty	Television film
1995	Dweebs	Alix	Episode: "The Bad P.R. Show"
1995	Seinfeld	Wendy	Episode: "The Kiss Hello"
1995	Cybill	Judy	Episode: "Cybill with an 'S'"
1996	Champs	Barb	Episode: "A Match Made at Seven"
1996	Good Company	Zoe Hellstrom	Series regular, 6 episodes
1996	Goode Behavior	Dr. Stephanie Krienberg	Episode: "Goode Feelings"
1996	Mr. Rhodes	Lenore Green	Episode: "Looking for Mrs. Goodbar"
1996	The Single Guy	Dr. Cornick	Episode: "New Year"
1997	Boston Common	Lauren Stone	Episode: "To Bare Is Human"
1997	Life's Work	Olivia McClure	Episode: "Dates"
1997	Perfect Body	Janet Bradley	Television film
1997–2003	Just Shoot Me!	Nina Van Horn	Series regular, 148 episodes
1998	The X-Files	Assistant Director J. Maslin	Episode: "The Beginning"
1999	The Secret Files of the Spy Dogs	Mistress Pavlov	Voice, episode: "Obedience"
1999	Take My Advice: The Ann and Abby Story	Ann Landers / Abigail Van Buren	Television film
1999	Batman Beyond	Dr. Price	Voice, episode: "Joyride"
2000	Pepper Ann	Denise Goldman	Voice, episode: "Too Cool to Be Mom"
2001	Strange Frequency	Maggie Stanton	Episode: "Don't Stop Believing"
2002	Ozzy & Drix	Sticky Flagella	Voice, episode: "Strep-Finger"
2002	Kim Possible	Elsa Cleeg	Voice, episode: "Kimitation Nation"
2002–2004	Fillmore!	Principal Folsom	Voice, 16 episodes
2003	Oliver Beene	Mrs. Darcel	Episode: "A Day at the Beach"
2003	My Life with Men	Emily Zebrowski	TV pilot
2003–2004	Frasier	Ronee Lawrence	Recurring role, 10 episodes
2003–2005	The Adventures of Jimmy Neutron: Boy Genius	Beautiful Gorgeous	Voice, 3 episodes
2004	The Stones	Gail	Episode: "She Ain't Heavy, She's My Sister"
2004	Wild Card	Melanie St. John	Episode: "A Felony for Melanie"
2004	Reba	Sadie	Episode: "Van's Agent"
2004	Father of the Pride	Victoria the Tiger	Voice, 5 episodes
2004	Static Shock	Dr. Robers / Omnara	Voice, episode: "Kidnapped"
2005–2006	Bratz	Burdine Maxwell / Bernice Maxwell / Gertrude	Voice, season 1
2005–2006	Jake in Progress	Naomi Clark	Series regular, 21 episodes
2005–2006	The X's	Mrs. X	Voice, main cast
2005	American Dragon: Jake Long	Aunt Patchouli	Voice, episode: "Adventures in Troll-Sitting"
2005	CSI: Crime Scene Investigation	Donna Eiger	Episode: "King Baby"
2005	Law & Order	Defense Attorney Dressler	Episode: "Dining Out"
2005	Out of Practice	Lois Turner	Episode: "The Wedding"
2006	Hello Sister, Goodbye Life	Barbara	Television film
2006–2007	Big Day	Jane	Series regular, 12 episodes
2006–2007	The Emperor's New School	Chicha	Voice, 10 episodes
2008	The Hill	Senator Lowell	TV pilot
2008	'Til Death	Dr. Friedman	Episode: "Sob Story"
2008	Will You Merry Me?	Suzie Fine	Television film
2009	The Ex List	Fiona Bloom	2 episodes
2009	Pushing Daisies	Coral Ramora	Episode: "Kerplunk"
2009	Glenn Martin, DDS	North Star Lady	Voice, episode: "Fatal Direction"
2010	True Jackson, VP	Libby Gibbils	Episode: "Saving Snackleberry"
2010	The Life & Times of Tim	Publishing House Executive	Voice, episode: "London Calling/Novelist"
2010–2015	Hot in Cleveland	Victoria Chase	Series regular, 128 episodes
2011	All My Children	Victoria Chase	1 episode
2011–2016	Kung Fu Panda: Legends of Awesomeness	Fenghuang	Voice, 4 episodes
2013	Bubble Guppies	Officer Miranda	Voice, episode: "The Police Cop-etition!"
2013	After All These Years	Audrey	Hallmark Movie Channel Television film
2014–2020	BoJack Horseman	Beatrice Horseman	Voice, 11 episodes
2014	Ultimate Spider-Man	Norma Osborn / Green Goblin	Voice, episode: "The Spider-Verse"
2015–2016	TripTank	Congressman Harkheimer, Sheriff Perkins' Wife	Voice, 2 episodes
2016	Rush Hour	Captain Cole	Series regular, 13 episodes
2016	Pitch	Maxine Armstrong	Recurring role
2016	Law & Order: Special Victims Unit	Regina Prince	Episode: "Assaulting Reality"
2016	NCIS: New Orleans	Sylvia Lund	Episode: "Escape Plan"
2016–2024	Kulipari	Spider Queen Jarrah	Voice, recurring role
2016–2021	American Housewife	Kathryn	11 episodes
2016	Lady Dynamite	Herself	Episode: "Knife Feelings"
2016	Finding Father Christmas	Margaret Whitcomb	Television film
2017	Mom	Danielle	2 episodes
2017	Grace and Frankie	Mimi	Episode: "The Alert"
2017	Darrow & Darrow	Joanna Darrow	Television film
2017	Engaging Father Christmas	Margaret Whitcomb	Television film
2018	Darrow & Darrow 2	Joanna Darrow	Television film
2018	This Is Us	Mary Damon	2 episodes
2018	Marrying Father Christmas	Margaret Whitcomb	Television film
2018–2020	The Ranch	Lisa Neumann	15 episodes
2018, 2020	The Boss Baby: Back in Business	Wendi	Voice, 2 episodes
2019	Witness to Murder: A Darrow Mystery	Joanna Darrow	Television film
2019	Darrow & Darrow 4: Burden of Proof	Joanna Darrow	Television film
2019	Richard Lovely	Alana Lovely	TV pilot
2019	Bluff City Law	Rachel	Episode: "Fire in a Crowded Theater"
2020–2023	The Owl House	Eda Clawthorne	Voice, main cast
2020	Bob Hearts Abishola	Jen Davenport	Episode: "There's My Nigerians"
2020	Modern Family	Audrey Beckman	Episode: "Baby Steps"
2020	Deranged Granny	Barbara Anders	Television film
2020, 2022	Billions	Leah Calder	2 episodes
2020–2024	Young Sheldon	President Hagemeyer	Recurring role
2021	Close Enough	Deborah Trickle	Voice, episode: "Meet the Frackers"
2021	Physical	Sheila's Mother	2 episodes
2021	Dear White People	Geraldine Bernadette	10 episodes
2021	Centaurworld	Gurple Durpleton	Voice, 2 episodes
2022	Family Guy	Judge	Voice, episode: "Lawyer Guy"
2022	Suitcase Killer: The Melanie McGuire Story	Patricia Prezioso	Television film
2022	Acapulco	Helen	Episode: "Hollywood Nights"
2023–present	Shrinking	Dr. Julie Baram	15 episodes
2023	How I Met Your Father	Daphne Dupree	Episode: "The Welcome Protocol"
2023	Rugrats	Judith	Voice, episode: "Tot Springs Showdown"
2023	Star Trek: Lower Decks	Cathiw	Voice, episode: "Empathalogical Fallacies"
2023–2025	Night Court	Julianne Walters	Recurring cast (seasons 1–2), main cast (season 3)
2024	Not Dead Yet	Mary-Sue Manners	Episode: "Not Polite Yet"
2024	The Chicken Sisters	Augusta 'Gus' Moore	Main cast
2026	How Not to Draw	Eda Clawthorne	Web series; voice, episode: "Luz"
2026	Chibiverse	Eda Clawthorne	Voice, episode: "Underground Monster Wrestling Club"

=== Video games ===
Year	Title	Voice role
2008	SpongeBob SquarePants Featuring Nicktoons: Globs of Doom	Beautiful Gorgeous

== Awards and nominations ==
Year	Award	Category	Work	Result
1992	CableACE Award	Outstanding Actress in a Comedy Series	Dream On	Won
1993	CableACE Award	Outstanding Actress in a Comedy Series	Dream On	Won
1994	CableACE Award	Outstanding Actress in a Comedy Series	Dream On	Won
1995	CableACE Award	Outstanding Actress in a Comedy Series	Dream On	Nominated
1996	CableACE Award	Outstanding Actress in a Comedy Series	Dream On	Won
1999	Golden Globe Award	Best Supporting Actress – Series, Miniseries or Television Film	Just Shoot Me!	Nominated
1999	Primetime Emmy Award	Outstanding Supporting Actress in a Comedy Series	Just Shoot Me!	Nominated
2000	Women in Film Lucy Award		Lucy Award	Won
2001	Satellite Award	Best Actress – Television Series Musical or Comedy	Just Shoot Me!	Nominated
2002	Primetime Emmy Award	Outstanding Supporting Actress in a Comedy Series	Just Shoot Me!	Nominated
2007	Gracie Award	Outstanding Supporting Actress in a Comedy Series	Big Day	Won
2011	Screen Actors Guild Award	Outstanding Performance by an Ensemble in a Comedy Series	Hot in Cleveland	Nominated
2013	Gracie Award	Outstanding Performance by an Ensemble in a Comedy Series	Hot in Cleveland	Won
2013	Women's Image Network Awards	Outstanding Actress Comedy Series	Hot in Cleveland	Nominated
2018	Annie Awards	Outstanding Achievement for Voice Acting in an Animated Television/Broadcast Production	BoJack Horseman	Nominated
2023	Catalina Film Festival	Best Actress	7000 Miles	Nominated
2024	Sedona International Film Festival	Best Lead Actress	7000 Miles	Won
2025	Screen Actors Guild Award	Outstanding Performance by an Ensemble in a Comedy Series	Shrinking	Nominated
