= Margo Howard =

American advice columnist (1940–2026)

Margo Howard (née Lederer; March 15, 1940 - July 13, 2026) was an American writer and advice columnist.

== Early life, family, and education ==
Margo Howard was born in Sioux City, Iowa, to Eppie Lederer (née Esther Pauline Friedman), better known as Ann Landers after her long-time advice column Ask Ann Landers, and Jules Lederer, a businessman and eventually the founder of Budget Rent a Car. She was their only child. Margo was the niece of Eppie's sister, Pauline Phillips, and the cousin of Jeanne Phillips (the latter two both better known as Abigail Van Buren and authors of the advice column Dear Abby). Although her mother and aunt were twin sisters, and close in their youth, an intense rivalry developed between them because of their columns. In an echo of that rivalry, Howard and her aunt never got along, and she had public differences with her cousin Jeanne Phillips, who took over the Dear Abby column when her mother died.

Howard attended Brandeis University, but dropped out to marry.

== Career ==
After leaving college, she worked at the Chicago Tribune and Chicago Daily News, and wrote for The New Republic, People, The Nation, and Boston Magazine. She wrote a syndicated social commentary column, Margo, in the 1970s.

For eight years, Howard wrote the Dear Prudence column featured in Slate. Dear Prudence also was featured on National Public Radio and syndicated in more than 200 newspapers. In February 2006, she left the Dear Prudence column, and began writing a Dear Margo column for Yahoo, then for Women on the Web (wowowow.com) through Creators Syndicate. On May 11, 2013, Howard ended the Dear Margo column, announcing that she was retiring from writing on a deadline and saying, "I plan to write long-form pieces as the spirit moves me".

In 2014, Howard published Eat, Drink, and Remarry: Confessions of a Serial Wife, remininsces of her four marriages.

== Personal life and death ==
Howard was married four times, first to John Coleman (1962–1967), second to Jules Furth (1971–1976), third to the actor Ken Howard (1977–1991), and fourth (and finally) to Ronald Weintraub, a Boston cardiac surgeon. After her divorce from Howard, she retained the surname for professional use.

Howard had three children by Coleman - two daughters, Abra and Andrea, and a son, Adam Coleman Howard, who is an actor and director.

Howard died on July 13, 2026, in Sarasota, Florida.
