= Jules Lederer =

American business executive

- Born: 1917; Detroit, Michigan, U.S.
- Died: 1999 (age 81); London, England
- Known for: Budget Rent a Car
- Spouse(s): Esther Pauline Friedman (m. 1938; div. 1975) Elizabeth Lederer
- Children: with Friedman: --Margo Lederer Howard with Elizabeth Lederer: --Anthea Lederer
- Family: Pauline Phillips (sister-in-law)

Jules Lederer (1917–1999) was an American business executive and innovator.

== Early life ==
Born in Detroit, Michigan, he dropped out of school in ninth grade, having to work from the time he was 13 to support his family. He made his living as a salesman.

== Career ==
In the 1950s, Lederer was president of the Autopoint Company in Chicago, Illinois and in 1960, he joined Morris Mirkin, who founded Budget Rent a Car company in 1958. The pair incorporated as Budget Rent a Car Corporation in 1960. In 1968, Transamerica Corporation bought Budget, with Lederer joining the board of Transamerica subsidiary Trans International Airlines. Budget Rent a Car is now a unit of Avis Budget Group. Budget Rent a Car became popular in its early days by renting cars at lower prices than its competitors, and it gained a following among a growing business and leisure travel market by renting cars from offices outside of airports. Additionally, Lederer is credited as one of the first to apply franchising to the rental car industry.

== Personal life ==
In 1938, Lederer married Esther "Eppie" Pauline Friedman in a Jewish ceremony in Sioux City, Iowa. They had one daughter, Margo Howard (ex-wife of actor Ken Howard), before divorcing in 1975.

According to his New York Times obituary of January 23, 1999, Lederer was selling hats at T. S. Martin Department Store in Sioux City, Iowa, when he met Friedman, who was engaged to another man; she and her identical twin sister Pauline Esther "Popo" were shopping for bridal veils for their double wedding. Jules and Esther fell in love and were married in a double ceremony. The two sisters would eventually become the writers of the widely syndicated advice columns, Ask Ann Landers and Dear Abby, respectively. Lederer's daughter Margo also became a newspaper columnist, writing for the Chicago Daily News. Married for 36 years, when the Lederers were divorced, Ann Landers described it in her next column as "one of the best marriages that didn't make it to the finish line."

Lederer later moved to London, where he remarried and had a daughter, Anthea Lederer, with his second wife, Elizabeth.

== Death ==
Lederer died of a heart attack at his home in London, aged 81. He was survived by his wife, Elizabeth; his daughters, Margo Lederer Howard and Anthea Lederer; a brother, Sol; a sister, Madelyn Ferris; three grandchildren; and three great-grandchildren.
