= Dean Phillips =

American businessman and politician (born 1969)

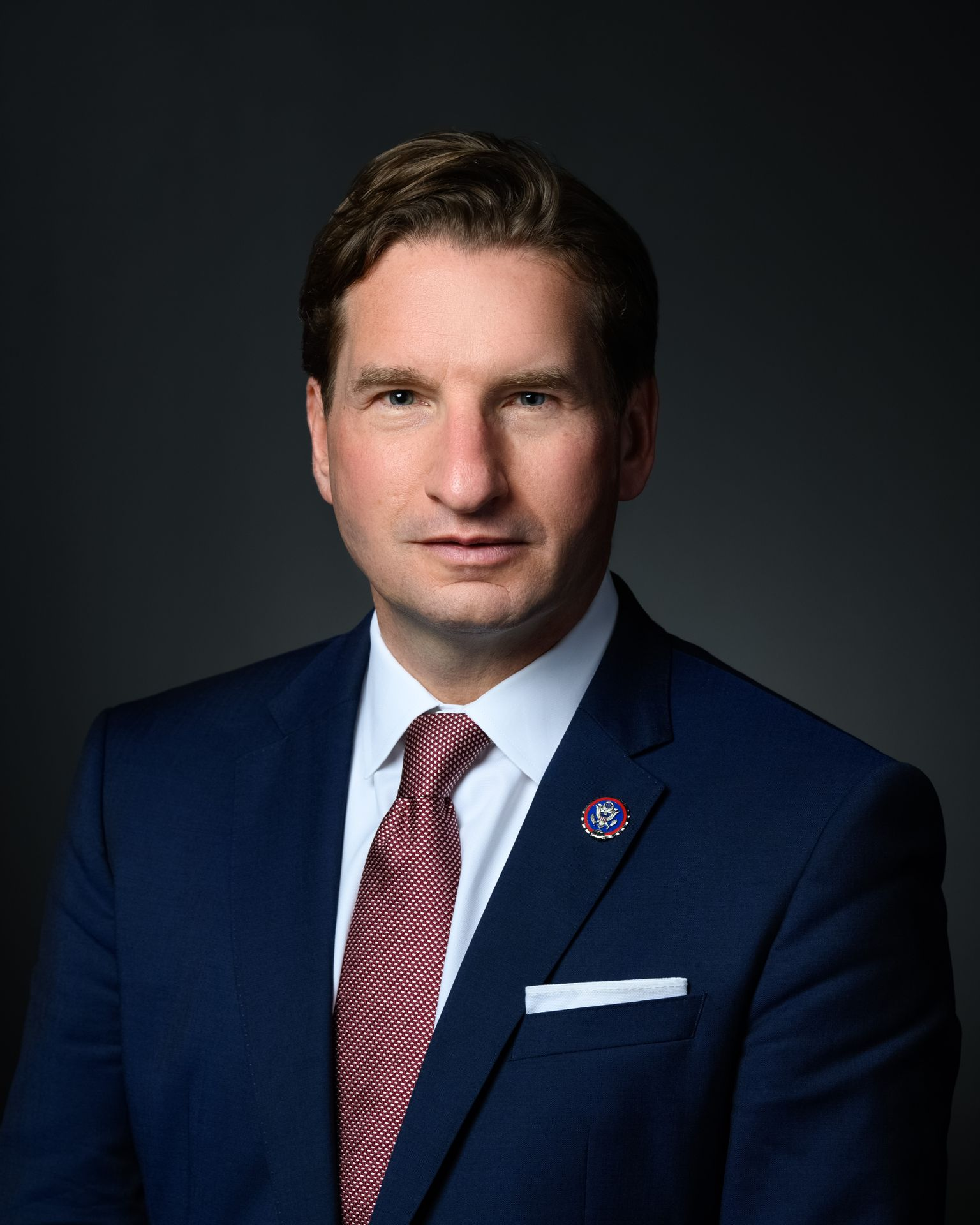
- Official portrait, 2021

Member of the U.S. House of Representatives from Minnesota's 3rd district
- In office January 3, 2019 – January 3, 2025
- Preceded by: Erik Paulsen
- Succeeded by: Kelly Morrison

Co-Chair of the House Democratic Policy and Communications Committee
- In office January 3, 2023 – October 1, 2024 Serving with Veronica Escobar and Lauren Underwood
- Leader: Hakeem Jeffries
- Preceded by: Debbie Dingell; Matt Cartwright; Ted Lieu
- Succeeded by: Lori Trahan

Personal details
- Born: Dean Benson Pfefer; January 20, 1969 (age 57) Saint Paul, Minnesota, U.S.
- Party: Democratic
- Spouse(s): Karin Einisman (m. 1995; div. 2015) Annalise Glick (m. 2019; div. 2024)
- Children: 2
- Relatives: Pauline Phillips (grandmother); Eppie Lederer (great aunt)
- Education: Brown University (BA); University of Minnesota (MBA)
- Phillips's voice Phillips supporting SALT deductions. Recorded December 19, 2019

Dean Benson Phillips (né Pfefer; born January 20, 1969) is an American politician, businessman, and former presidential candidate who served from 2019 to 2025 as the U.S. representative for Minnesota's 3rd congressional district. A member of the Democratic Party, Phillips was an executive in the food and beverage industry before entering politics. Formerly the president and CEO of his family's distilled spirits business, Phillips Distilling Company, he also was the co-owner of Talenti Gelato, Belvedere Vodka, and the Twin Cities-based coffeehouse chain Penny's.

Phillips was first elected in 2018, defeating six-term Republican incumbent Erik Paulsen. He became the first Democrat to win the seat in sixty years, and was reelected twice by comfortable margins. In November 2023, Phillips announced that he would not run for another term, focusing on his presidential bid instead. Phillips was considered a moderate Democrat and briefly co-chaired the House Democratic Policy and Communications Committee.

In October 2023, Phillips challenged incumbent president Joe Biden for the Democratic Party nomination in the 2024 presidential election. Running a long-shot campaign centered around providing younger leadership, he received four delegates to the 2024 Democratic National Convention, the second-most of any candidate in the primaries, making him the runner-up to Biden.

== Early life, education, and career ==
Phillips was born to DeeDee (Cohen) and Artie Pfefer in Saint Paul, Minnesota, in 1969. His father was killed in the Vietnam War six months after Phillips was born, making him a Gold Star Son. His mother married Eddie Phillips, heir to the Phillips Distilling Company and the son of advice columnist Pauline Phillips (popularly known as Dear Abby), in 1972. Eddie adopted Dean, who took the last name Phillips. He was raised Jewish.

In the early 1970s, Phillips moved from Saint Paul to Edina. He attended The Blake School. In the summer of 1989, Phillips interned for Senator Patrick Leahy on Capitol Hill, an experience that helped inspire his own public service 30 years later. Phillips attended Brown University, where he served as consul (president) of the Sigma Chi fraternity, Beta Nu chapter. He graduated in 1991. Phillips worked for bicycle equipment startup InMotion for two years before joining his family's business Phillips Distilling Company, where he served in multiple positions in rectifying, production, sales, and marketing management. He completed his Master of Business Administration at the University of Minnesota's Carlson School of Management in 2000, after which he was named president and CEO of the company.

After selling Belvedere Vodka to luxury conglomerate LVMH for an undisclosed sum in the mid 2000s, Phillips pioneered the organic vodka category with Prairie Organic Vodka and flavored whiskey category with Phillips Union Whisky. In 2012, he stepped aside to run one of his other corporate investments, Talenti gelato, where he served as chairman until it was sold for an undisclosed amount to Unilever in 2014. Phillips served on the board at Allina Health, one of Minnesota's largest nonprofit health care systems, from 2005 to 2011, and as chairman from 2009 to 2011. From 2013 to 2015, he co-chaired the We Day organization events that encourage student volunteerism. Phillips also chaired the board of the Phillips Family Foundation, his family's charitable work foundation.

Minnesota Democratic–Farmer–Labor Party chairman Ken Martin recruited Phillips to run for Congress after trying for many years. Martin and others worked hard to get Phillips elected. He saw Phillips as a "rising star" in the party. In 2018, former Minnesota Supreme Court justice and professional football player Alan Page contributed $1,000 to Phillips's campaign against Republican U.S. representative Erik Paulsen in Minnesota's Third Congressional District. In September 2018, while on her way to the 70th Primetime Emmy Awards ceremony, actress Laura Dern asked people to vote for Phillips in his congressional race. Also in 2018, the gun safety organization Giffords, founded by former congresswoman Gabrielle Giffords, endorsed Phillips in the race for Minnesota's 3rd congressional district. In a statement, Giffords praised Phillips for his commitment to cut ties between Congress and special interests, particularly the gun lobby. During that campaign, Phillips drove a 1960 International Harvester milk truck emblazoned with his name and the tagline "Government Repair Truck" to 32 cities and towns across the district. He also used a pontoon boat to campaign on Lake Minnetonka.

== U.S. House of Representatives ==
=== Elections ===
==== 2018 ====
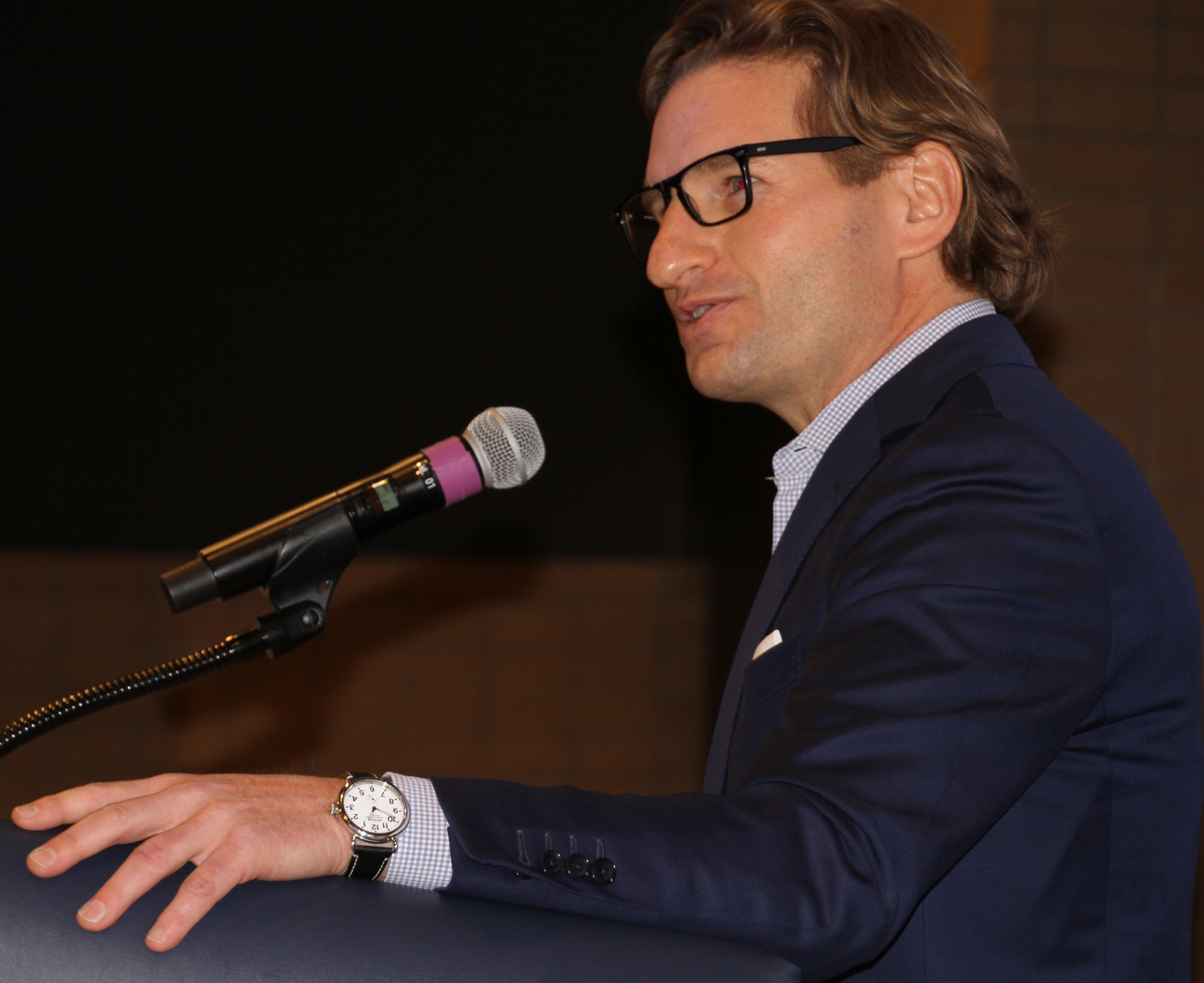
Phillips addressing the Democratic-Farmer-Labor Party State Central Committee in 2017

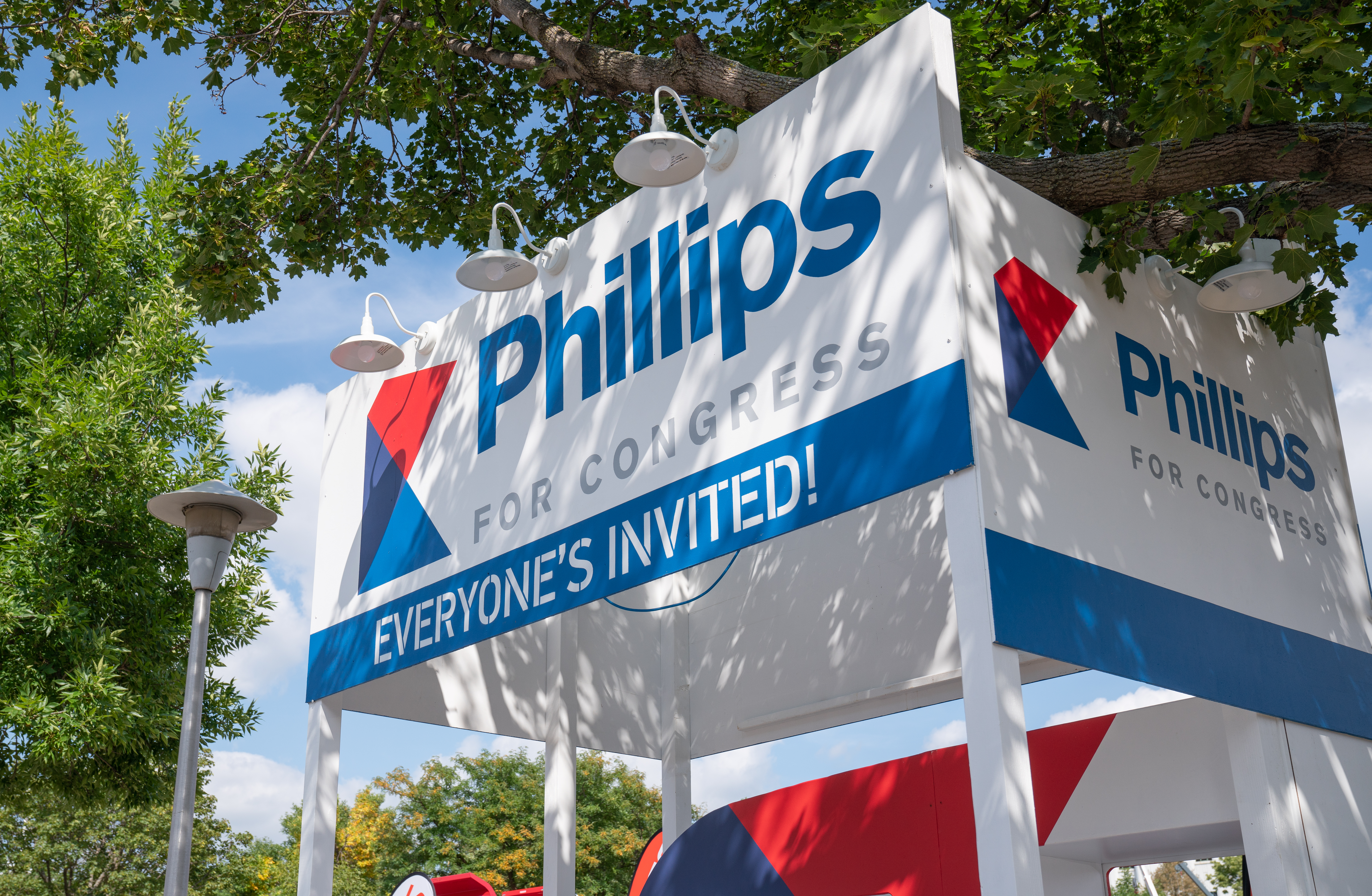
Phillips campaign booth at the Minnesota State Fair

In 2018, Phillips ran for the United States House of Representatives in Minnesota's 3rd congressional district as a Democrat. In the Democratic primary, he defeated former sales associate Cole Young with 81.6% of the vote. Phillips won all three counties in the district. In the general election, Phillips defeated incumbent Republican Erik Paulsen with 55.6% of the vote. When he took office in 2019, he became the first Democrat to hold this seat since 1961.

==== 2020 ====
Phillips ran for reelection in 2020. He defeated Cole Young in the Democratic primary with 90.7% of the vote and faced off against the Republican nominee, businessman Kendall Qualls. Phillips defeated Qualls with 55.6% of the vote.

==== 2022 ====
Phillips was unopposed in the Democratic primary. In the general election, he defeated the Republican nominee, retired U.S. Navy submarine officer Tom Weiler, with 60% of the vote.

=== Tenure ===
According to FiveThirtyEight's congressional vote tracker at ABC News, Phillips voted with President Joe Biden's stated public policy positions 100% of the time, making him more liberal than average in the 117th Congress when predictive scoring (district partisanship and voting record) is used. Phillips voted in favor of Biden's major economic agenda items, including the Inflation Reduction Act, the Bipartisan Infrastructure Law, and the CHIPS and Science Act. During the start of his first term in 2019, the McCourt School of Public Policy at Georgetown University placed him 27th out of 435 members in terms of bipartisanship. In 2021, Phillips received the Bipartisan Policy Center's Bipartisan Legislative Action Award.

Phillips authored five provisions in the For the People Act, an anti-corruption and voting rights reform bill that passed the House in March 2021. It also included a major overhaul of campaign finance and redistricting laws. Phillips's provisions for the package included the Voter NOTICE Act, which sought to fight disinformation, and the FIREWALL Act, which sought to strengthen safeguards of online advertising.

Phillips played for the Democrats' team in the 2021 Congressional Baseball Game at Nationals Park.

Phillips has expressed pride that he is the only member of Congress to have refused all money from lobbyists, special interest groups, and Political Action Committees, and not to have his own leadership Political Action Committee.

On June 21, 2023, Phillips sponsored the Allergen Disclosure In Non-Food Articles (ADINA) Act, which would require drug labels to identify ingredients that contain, or are derived from, major food allergens or gluten-containing grains on par with labeling standards for food products.

On May 17, 2024, Phillips reintroduced the Voter Choice Act, which provides $40 million in federal matching grants, covering up to 50% of the cost for local and state governments that choose to adopt ranked-choice voting.

On December 16, 2024, Phillips delivered his farewell address on the House floor. In it, he criticized America's two major political parties for "legalized corruption" that prioritizes their own "self-protection over principles" and urged his colleagues to find commonsense solutions and focus on ideas over ideology in solving problems.

==== Abortion ====
On December 16, 2021, the Planned Parenthood Action Fund endorsed Phillips for reelection. After Roe v. Wade (1973) was overturned in Dobbs v. Jackson Women's Health Organization (2022), Phillips co-sponsored bills to protect women's reproductive rights that aimed to ensure access to abortion and reproductive health care across states, including H.R. 8297: Ensuring Access to Abortion Act of 2022, as well as HR 8111: My Body, My Data Act of 2022.

==== Campaign finance reform ====
On May 10, 2022, Phillips received an A+ on End Citizens United's anti-corruption and voting rights scorecard for "rejecting corporate PAC money and supporting once-in-a-generation anti-corruption and voting rights legislation".

==== Cannabis ====
Phillips championed cannabis reform bills like the MORE Act and the SAFE Banking Act.

==== Climate action ====
Phillips co-sponsored H.R. 2307, the Energy Innovation and Carbon Dividend Act, which would put a price on carbon and return the proceeds to taxpayers, and H.R. 8395, the EPA Regulatory Authority Act of 2022, which would restore the EPA's ability to regulate greenhouse gas emissions. On July 11, 2022, the Sierra Club endorsed Phillips for reelection to Congress for his environmental advocacy.

==== Congressional stock trading ban ====
Phillips co-sponsored the TRUST in Congress Act, which would require lawmakers, their spouses, and dependent children to place their assets in a blind trust from their first day in office until 180 days after they leave office.

==== Healthcare ====
On December 20, 2023, Phillips co-sponsored the Medicare for All Act. This marked a departure from his earlier position on healthcare; he said that he had previously been "convinced through propaganda that single-payer healthcare was a nonsensical leftist notion". He cited a confluence of factors that shifted his view in favor of Medicare for All, including his experience caring for his daughter who had been diagnosed with Hodgkin lymphoma, the financial strain of providing health insurance to his employees as a business owner, and the dynamics of representing a congressional district that includes the headquarters of UnitedHealth Group as well as many people who struggle to access healthcare. Also, Phillips said that he had “some differences of opinion on some of the transitional plans and some of the parameters” of the “Medicare for All” bill.

==== Immigration ====
Phillips co-sponsored the Liberian Refugee Immigration Fairness Act, giving Liberians a pathway to citizenship, which Trump signed into law.

==== Foreign affairs ====
On March 5, 2022, Phillips was among the lawmakers who met with Ukrainian President Volodymyr Zelenskyy about providing additional help to Ukraine in fending off Russia's invasion. Phillips was among the U.S. delegation that attended the 2022 World Economic Forum in Davos, Switzerland. Phillips supported a two-state solution in the Israeli–Palestinian conflict and has criticized Israeli Prime Minister Benjamin Netanyahu's opposition to Palestinian statehood.

==== January 6 attack ====
During the January 6 United States Capitol attack, the House was in session. After members of congress discovered rioters had entered the building in an attempt to overturn the 2020 presidential election, Phillips shouted "this is because of you!" at his Republican colleagues.

==== Jobs and the economy ====
Phillips sponsored the Paycheck Protection Program Flexibility Act of 2020, which President Donald Trump signed into law. On September 27, 2024, he introduced the American Dream Accounts Act of 2024, which would establish in the Social Security Administration a $5,000 account for every American child to be invested in an index fund and vest upon graduation from high school, GED, or waiver for disability.

==== Public safety ====
On March 5, 2020, Phillips received an endorsement from Brady: United Against Gun Violence for working across party lines to pass gun violence prevention bills. He voted to mandate background checks on every firearm sale, including sales online and at gun shows, and has said that red-flag laws "work". Phillips sponsored the Pathways to Policing Act to provide $50 million to the Department of Justice and local communities to enhance officer recruitment efforts. Another $50 million would go to the Department of Justice to create Minnesota-style Pathways to Policing programs in states across the nation.

==== Public education ====
On July 10, 2023, Phillips co-led the bicameral IDEA Full Funding Act in the House of Representatives. This legislation aimed to ensure Congress fully funds the Individuals with Disabilities Education Act (IDEA).

==== Term limits for Congress and the Supreme Court ====
Phillips has advocated for an 18-year term limit in the House of Representatives, the Senate, and the Supreme Court.

=== Committee assignments ===
For the 118th Congress:

- Committee on Foreign Affairs
  - Subcommittee on the Middle East, North Africa and Central Asia (Ranking Member)
- Committee on Small Business
  - Subcommittee on Economic Growth, Tax and Capital Access
  - Subcommittee on Innovation, Entrepreneurship, and Workforce Development

=== Caucus memberships ===
- Congressional Arts Caucus
- Congressional LGBT Equality Caucus
- New Democrat Coalition
- Congressional Ukraine Caucus
- Problem Solvers Caucus
- Rare Disease Caucus

== 2024 presidential campaign ==
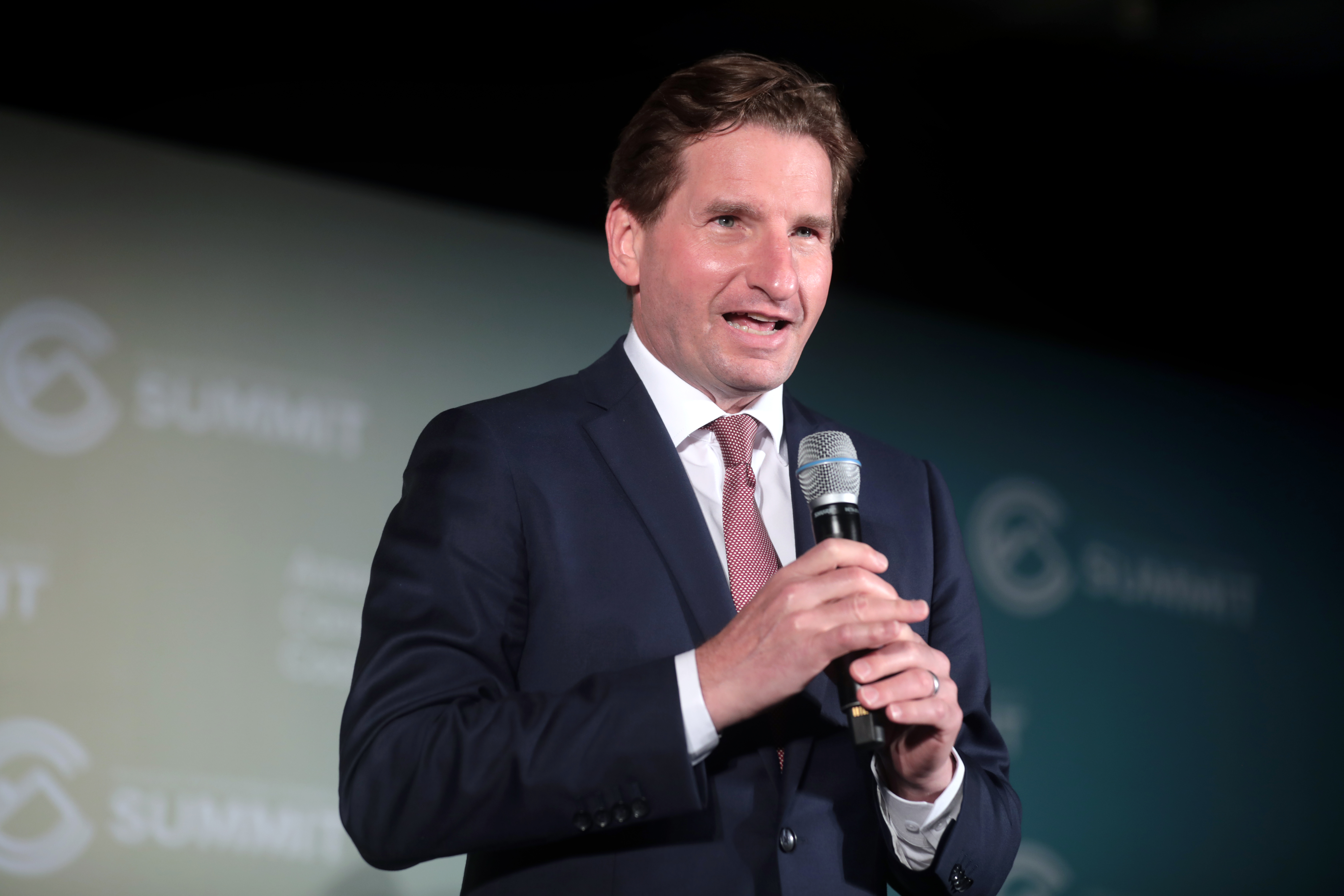
Phillips speaking at a campaign event in June 2022

In July 2022, Phillips became the first Democratic member of Congress to say President Biden should not run for reelection and called for "generational change", pointing to Biden's age. In July 2023, Phillips said he was considering challenging Biden in the 2024 Democratic presidential primaries. Before launching his campaign, Phillips reportedly reached out to other elected Democratic officials, such as governors Gretchen Whitmer and JB Pritzker, to urge them to enter the presidential primary, but they declined to speak with him directly. Phillips said that he found both the city of Washington, D.C., and the reluctance of his fellow Democrats to call on Biden not to run again to be distastefully insular and partisan. In October 2023, he announced that he would step down as co-chair of the House Democratic Policy and Communications Committee because his views on the 2024 U.S. presidential election were incongruent with the majority of his caucus. Many Democrats in Congress urged Phillips not to launch a primary bid against Biden.

Phillips' presidential campaign logo

On October 27, 2023, in Concord, New Hampshire, Phillips announced his candidacy for president after filing the paperwork with the Federal Election Commission the previous day. During his campaign, Phillips argued that Biden would be a weak general-election candidate due to his age and low approval ratings. He campaigned as a younger alternative who would be a stronger opponent to Donald Trump. Phillips's campaign slogan was "Make America Affordable Again", a play on Trump's political movement and "Make America Great Again", as well as high voter dissatisfaction with the economy, especially inflation and prices. Phillips's campaign advisor Steve Schmidt said that Phillips saw not being well-known "as an asset: he doesn't have decades of political stink on him to overcome, and he can build up a lot of name recognition quickly because you can get famous very fast in American politics". Schmidt added, "The idea that voters having a choice in the primary will ultimately threaten democracy by throwing the election to Trump demonstrates how far off the rails we've gotten."

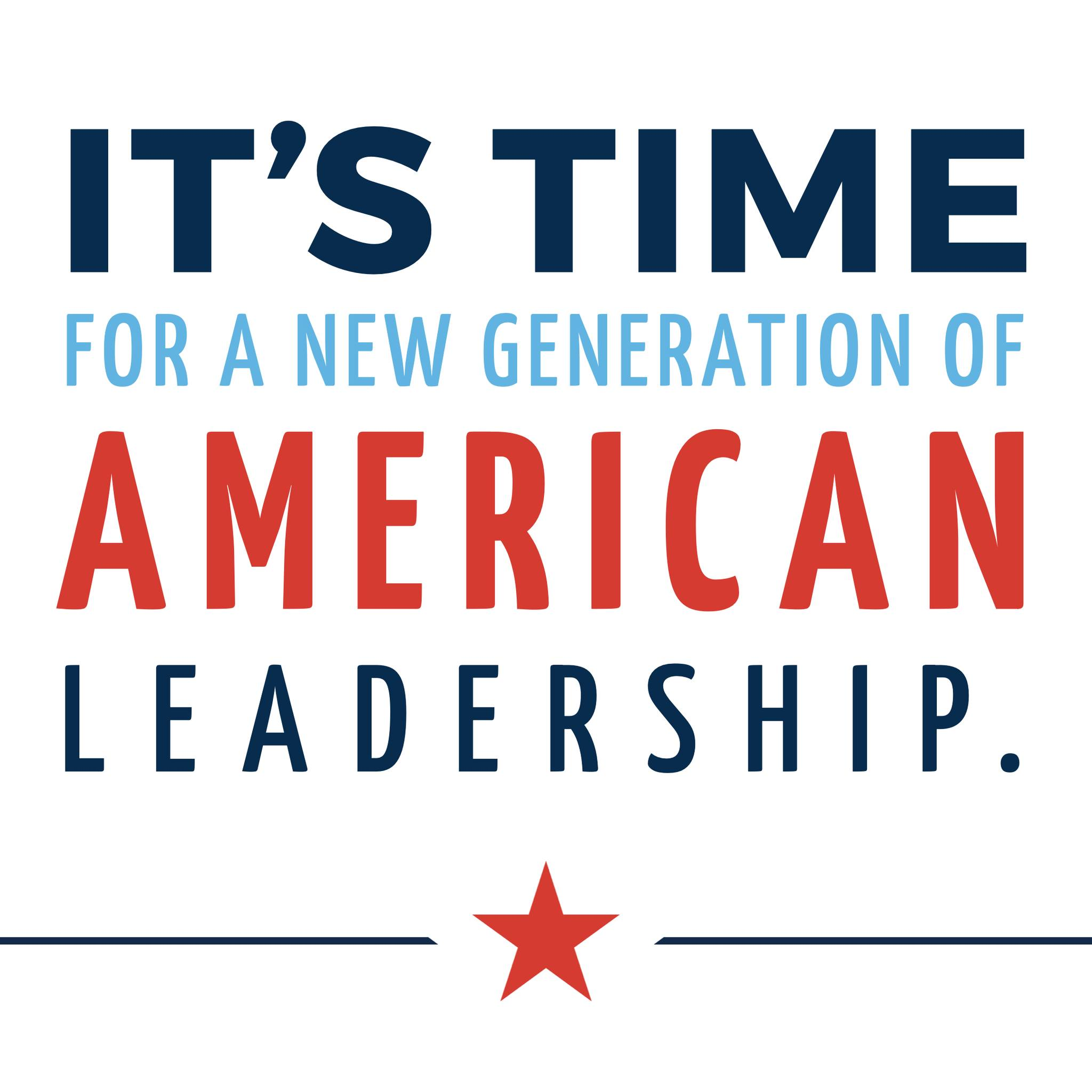
Phillips' secondary presidential campaign logo

In November 2023, the Nelson A. Rockefeller Center for Public Policy and the Social Sciences at Dartmouth College and the Dartmouth Political Union co-hosted a discussion with Phillips as part of their "Path to the Presidency" speaker series to discuss his campaign and policy positions. In New Hampshire, Phillips hit the campaign trail with a “Dean Phillips for President” bus, and his 1960 International Harvester milk truck, dubbed the "government repair truck", made an appearance repainted with "Dean Phillips for President". On November 3, 2023, Phillips appeared on an episode of Real Time with Bill Maher. Host Bill Maher lauded Phillips but stopped short of a full endorsement. On November 17, Phillips joined the All-In podcast for an interview. On November 18, he discussed the case for his campaign at the Blue Jamboree rally hosted by the Charleston County Democratic Party in South Carolina. On November 30, Phillips visited the Pod Save America studio to discuss his campaign. On December 8, he met with voters at a veterans' home in Tilton, New Hampshire, and at a town hall in Exeter, New Hampshire.

On December 14, during an appearance on Meet the Press NOW, Phillips criticized Biden's candidacy, saying, "The president is not a threat to democracy, but running and suppressing other candidates is a threat when you are behind in the polls like he is." He added, "He's a good man and someone I respect, but this delusion that he can win is a threat to democracy." On December 23, Phillips said that Biden should "thoughtfully exit" the race. On January 20, 2024, he told Axios that he thought it was "impossible" for Biden to do the job for four more years, and that "At that stage of life, it is impossible ultimately to conduct, to prosecute the office of the American presidency in the way that this country in the world needs right now. That is an absolute truth."

Phillips said he would try to gain access to the primary ballots in several states where the Democratic Party had excluded him. The Democratic Party of Wisconsin left Phillips off the ballot; he appealed to the Wisconsin Supreme Court on January 26, 2024. On February 2, the court unanimously ruled that Phillips should be included on the ballot. Phillips said his campaign depended on alternative media platforms to get his message across because MSNBC and CNN would not interview him, despite giving every Republican primary challenger to Trump a town hall. Phillips accused Biden campaign representatives of pressuring liberal media outlets into blackballing and deplatforming him. The New York Times reported that during his campaign, Phillips found himself deplatformed, taken off the ballot in some states, and rarely invited on television to make his case. He also accused the Democratic National Committee of obstructing Democrats and Independents from ballot access—"bleeding campaigns dry" by suing non-incumbent candidates and imposing "absurd signature requirements".

Phillips called the DNC's ruling that New Hampshire's presidential primary was "meaningless" and that no New Hampshire delegates would be counted at the convention "one of the most egregious affronts to democracy that I've ever seen in my entire lifetime". In a statement to Politico, he called Florida Democrats' handling of the primary process a "blatant act of electoral corruption" and demanded that Biden "condemn and immediately address" it. Phillips added, "The intentional disenfranchisement of voters runs counter to everything for which our Democratic Party and country stand. Our mission as Democrats is to defeat authoritarians, not become them."

Phillips insisted throughout his campaign that the Democratic Party was "delusional" to believe Biden could beat Trump in a rematch. An argument and central critique of Phillips's campaign was that if Democrats created room for a competitive primary against the unpopular sitting president, voters would have a chance to hear other points of view. He argued that the Democratic establishment was choking off his challenge because it couldn't accept that "Biden is going to get creamed". In public, Phillips was ridiculed. In private, others in the Democratic Party shared his concerns. Phillips said that in his first 100 days as president, he intended to build "the most extraordinary bipartisan cabinet in American history". His other first-100-day priorities included "zero-based budgeting" and hiring an international consulting firm to conduct a "top-down assessment" of the federal government. Phillips told CNN that when he entered the presidential race, "This was not about me ... But my inability to attract other candidates, to inspire the president to recognize that it is time, compels me to serve my country because it appears that President Joe Biden is going to lose the next election."

Phillips received his first endorsement from New Hampshire state representative Steve Shurtleff, who said his main reason for doing so was that Biden allowed the Democratic National Committee to attempt to strip New Hampshire of its first-in-the-nation status. Shurtleff said in January 2023 that he would endorse a candidate other than Biden if one ran. New Hampshire state representative Tom Schamberg also endorsed Phillips. Forward Party founder Andrew Yang consistently expressed support for Phillips's campaign since soon after its launch, and co-hosted campaign events with him in Manchester and Hanover, New Hampshire, on January 18, 2024. In January 2024, billionaire hedge fund manager Bill Ackman said he supported Phillips's campaign, donating $1 million to his We Deserve Better campaign PAC.

On January 8, 2024, Phillips participated in a debate with Marianne Williamson hosted by New England College in Manchester, New Hampshire. On January 12, NewsNation hosted a forum featuring Phillips and other Democratic presidential candidates. Biden was invited but did not attend. Dan Abrams moderated the discussion. The same day, Phillips appeared on The Breakfast Club radio show. On January 20, he appeared on the Modern Wisdom podcast with Chris Williamson to discuss his campaign. On January 22, Phillips met with voters at a meeting of a Rotary Club in Nashua, New Hampshire. On January 23, he scolded reporters during a press gaggle in New Hampshire for not focusing on the issues Americans cared about, namely the economy, inflation, health care, Social Security, homelessness in their cities, and education, not the reporters' "clickbait" questions. On January 27, Biden and Phillips spoke about their bids for the Democratic nomination at the South Carolina Democratic Party's First-in-the-Nation Celebration dinner in Columbia, South Carolina.

Other notable people who endorsed Phillips are angel investor and podcaster Jason Calacanis, Curai Health CEO Neal Khosla (son of Vinod Khosla), entrepreneur and philanthropist Jed McCaleb, Galaxy Investment Partners CEO Michael Novogratz, political and corporate strategist Steve Schmidt, and former Bernie Sanders campaign manager and political strategist Jeffrey P. Weaver. The editorial boards of the New Hampshire Union Leader, Conway Daily Sun, and The Detroit News endorsed Phillips.

Phillips lost the New Hampshire Democratic primary to Biden, receiving 19.9% of the vote. Biden was a write-in candidate. On February 4, 2024, after his loss in the South Carolina primary, Phillips vowed to remain in the race as "a mission of principle". In the California primary, he received 2.8% of the total votes cast, with 100,284 votes. In the Oklahoma primary, he received 8.9% of the vote and a plurality in Cimarron County. On March 6, Phillips suspended his campaign following Super Tuesday and endorsed Biden. After the endorsement, Biden called Phillips on the phone. Phillips said the two "had a wonderful conversation" that ended in an invitation to discuss the state of the 2024 race at the White House.

Phillips had the second-most awarded pledged delegates of any candidate in the 2024 Democratic Party presidential primaries, with four, and received 529,486 votes. In the Ohio Democratic presidential primary, he received 12.9% of the total votes cast and three delegates to the Democratic National Convention, meeting the 15% threshold of votes needed to receive a delegate in a congressional district in the state's 2nd, 6th, and 14th districts. In the Nebraska primary, Phillips received 9.8% of the total vote and earned one delegate by receiving the most votes of any candidate in Logan County, with 55.6% of the vote. Based on the Nebraska primary results, one Phillips delegate represented Madison County at the Nebraska Democratic State Convention. In the Missouri primary, he tied with Biden in Clark County.

=== Post-presidential campaign ===
On April 16, 2024, Phillips blamed the national political parties, the media, and "apathetic" voters for his failure to succeed as a modern-day Paul Revere, warning his party of the dangers of allowing an aging Biden to once again take on Trump. He also said he was surprised by the strength of the nation's two-party system, a "duopoly" that has "a decreasing focus on the country and an increasing focus on winning". Phillips said: "I had a network of donors who could have financially supported the campaign, but most of them were too scared to touch it. If you want to maintain your access to power, you have every incentive not to speak up." After the first presidential debate between Biden and Trump, Politico reported that a former senior Biden White House official said, "No Labels and Dean Phillips won this debate." On July 11, Jermaine Johnson, a Democratic state representative from Richland County, South Carolina, apologized to Phillips on behalf of those who criticized, ignored, and shunned him despite not being one of them himself. On July 19, D.J. Tice, an opinion columnist for the Minnesota Star Tribune, apologized to Phillips for his self-described snide coverage of Phillips's campaign.

Biden withdrew from the presidential election on July 21, 2024. The same day, shortly before Biden ended his campaign, Phillips urged Democrats to hold an "immediate" vote of confidence on Biden in a Wall Street Journal column and Face the Nation interview amid growing concerns about his reelection chances. Despite claiming that he still endorsed Biden, Phillips also said on Face the Nation that "it is time [for Biden] to step aside and turn this over to a new generation." After Biden withdrew, Phillips said numerous Democrats reached out to him and expressed regret at not taking his concerns more seriously. He expressed disappointment that Biden had not dropped out far earlier and said that "vindication has never felt so unfulfilling". The New York Times called him the "modern Cassandra of American politics" because his warnings about Biden's fitness and age proved prescient despite being ignored. The Minnesota Star Tribune reported in August that Phillips said, "If people write anything, I just hope that they might write if [Biden] had debated me then and he had been on one stage, unscripted, with a national audience, and he demonstrated that decline then, this would have been very different circumstances. ... And that's what I was trying to do."

On July 22, 2024, the day after Biden withdrew, Phillips backed eventual Democratic presidential nominee Kamala Harris but also proposed a straw poll of delegates ahead of the Democratic National Convention to determine the party's top four presidential contenders, who would then take part in four town halls outlining their platforms. After the town halls, the delegates would vote to choose the nominee. Phillips explained his reasoning for running against Biden in an August 20 interview at the 2024 Democratic National Convention, saying that he had argued as early as July 2022 that Biden should "pass the torch"; after Biden withdrew in July 2024, some of his colleagues understood why he ran. Phillips was a superdelegate to the 2024 Democratic National Convention and told Politico on the convention floor, "I was trying to be a Paul Revere, not a George Washington."

Both CNN's lead Washington anchor Jake Tapper and political commentator Tim Miller gave Phillips credit for his early questioning of Biden's bid for reelection. On August 17, 2024, an opinion column in the Duluth News Tribune argued that "the Democratic Party owes Dean Phillips an apology".

On November 10, 2024, journalist Shannon Bream asked Phillips whether he felt overlooked by his party during the campaign and election; he replied, "My voice, yes, was ignored, but tens of millions of Americans' voices were ignored and suppressed and disenfranchised." On November 11, 2024, former U.S. representative Joe Cunningham wrote that Phillips "showed immense courage by openly encouraging a primary. And when no one stepped forward offered himself up so voters would have a choice." In an interview after the election, Phillips said: "My run wasn't about me. It was about having a legitimate, invitational, competitive, spirited primary. That means debate. And had there been other candidates on a primary stage, I'm almost certain that Americans, at least Democratic primary voters, would have selected someone in a better position to ultimately beat the most dangerous Republican candidate of our lifetime." HuffPost reported that after the election Phillips said of his White House bid, "I would do it a thousand times again... My only regret—and it's a big one—is that so many of my colleagues who felt exactly the same way couldn't find the courage to say and do something about it." On November 24, Phillips participated in a podcast with The Lever founder and editor-in-chief David Sirota. Sirota credited him for his early warnings to Democrats about Biden's electability. U.S. representative Lloyd Doggett, the first Democrat in Congress to openly call for Biden to withdraw from the election after the first presidential debate, said after Trump won, "I only regret I didn't do it earlier ... I believe that the only person in our caucus who doesn't share some responsibility for the outcome is Dean Phillips, who came out early." On December 26, Mother Jones named Phillips a "Hero of 2024" for being the only elected official to challenge Biden in the Democratic primary who tried to make the case that Biden was unfit for office.

As part of the "11 Democratic Thinkers on What the Party Needs Right Now" article in Politico, Andrew Yang called for Phillips to become the new Democratic National Committee Chairman. He wrote: "First, the Democrats should apologize for sandbagging Bernie Sanders in the 2016 primary. After, they should name Dean Phillips the new chair of the DNC, as the only Democrat with the character to sacrifice his own career for the good of the country." On December 28, 2024, Politico reported that Phillips was right about Biden's reelection campaign and that his decision to launch a primary challenge proved prescient after Biden's performance in his debate against Trump. The same day, the Guardian reported that Phillips was "saddened" to be vindicated in his prediction that Biden could not win reelection. On December 30, The New York Times dubbed Phillips the "Most Prophetic" in its 2024 High School Yearbook of American Politics for challenging Biden for the Democratic nomination.

On January 7, 2025, New York Times columnist Bret Stephens wrote that Phillips should be nominated for a Profile in Courage Award because it was left to him to "play the part of the boy who says the emperor has no clothes". On January 22, during a podcast with New York University professor Scott Galloway, Democratic political strategist Jessica Tarlov said, "there are all these Democrats who now feel emboldened to talk about how they knew Biden shouldn't have been the nominee... and the time for that was in the public square, frankly, when Dean Phillips was screaming from the rooftops, 'if I have to be the guy I'll be the guy'". On February 9, former U.S. representative Tim Roemer wrote the Democratic Party an open letter saying, "We had an opportunity during the primary campaign (when we ignored Rep. Dean Phillips' warnings) to voice our concerns about Biden's age or to remind him that we voted for him in 2020 to defeat Donald Trump and serve one term." On February 14, former U.S. representative John Delaney tweeted, "Democrats certainly would have been better served listening to Dean Phillips because it turns out that he was 100% correct in his assessment of the 2024 election so perhaps the better plan might be to not ignore what he has to say but listen and learn?"

On July 10, 2025, The Hill reported that CNN interviewed Phillips about New York City mayoral nominee Zohran Mamdani. Phillips said: "Mamdani, as you have referenced just moments ago, is a grave threat to Democrats around the country. He could be the mayor of New York." He added: "I think that would be detrimental for the party. Anyone who talks about seizing the means of production or opening government-run grocery stores is at great odds with most of the country."

== Electoral history ==
=== 2018 ===
Democratic primary results, 2018
Party	Candidate	Votes	%
Democratic (DFL)	Dean Phillips	56,697	81.6
Democratic (DFL)	Cole Young	12,784	18.4
Total votes		69,481	100.0

Minnesota's 3rd congressional district, 2018
Party	Candidate	Votes	%
Democratic (DFL)	Dean Phillips	202,402	55.6
Republican	Erik Paulsen (incumbent)	160,839	44.2
Write-in		707	0.2
Total votes		363,948	100
Democratic (DFL) gain from Republican			

=== 2020 ===
Democratic primary results, 2020
Party	Candidate	Votes	%
Democratic (DFL)	Dean Phillips (incumbent)	73,011	90.7
Democratic (DFL)	Cole Young	7,443	9.3
Total votes		80,454	100.0

Minnesota's 3rd congressional district, 2020
Party	Candidate	Votes	%
Democratic (DFL)	Dean Phillips (incumbent)	246,666	55.6
Republican	Kendall Qualls	196,625	44.3
Write-in		312	0.1
Total votes		443,603	100

=== 2022 ===
Minnesota's 3rd congressional district, 2022
Party	Candidate	Votes	%
Democratic (DFL)	Dean Phillips (incumbent)	198,883	59.6
Republican	Tom Weiler	134,797	40.4
Write-in		241	0.2
Total votes		333,921	100
Democratic (DFL) hold			

== Personal life ==
Phillips is divorced and has two adult daughters. He is Jewish, and was acknowledged by the Minnesota publication The American Jewish World for serving on the board of Temple Israel in Minneapolis. Phillips's paternal grandmother, Pauline Phillips, was the author of the advice column "Dear Abby", under the pen name Abigail Van Buren. He has said that Elie Wiesel's book Night has stuck with him and that he kept it on his table in Washington and at home.

Phillips is friends with actor Woody Harrelson, whom he met and befriended when Harrelson rented his house while shooting the movie Wilson. Harrelson joined Phillips on a trip to Vietnam, where Phillips's father was killed in a helicopter crash. The trip to Vietnam gained more attention during a stop in Seoul, South Korea, when Phillips ran into a group of K-Pop stars from BigBang and BLACKPINK and a popular South Korean actor, Park Bo-gum, at a recording studio. Phillips called the South Korean superstars "kind and warm".

Phillips is a childhood friend of Representative Kelly Morrison. Phillips is a college friend of Uber Chief Executive Dara Khosrowshahi. He is a Minnesota Vikings fan.

== Publications ==
=== Articles ===
- "Third Congressional District/Dean Phillips: I'll continue defending abortion rights, families' needs", Minnesota Star Tribune, October 19, 2022
- "Democrats in Congress Should Hold a Confidence Vote on Biden", The Wall Street Journal, July 21, 2024
- "I Warned My Party About Biden's Health. Will They Listen Now?", The Free Press, May 22, 2025
- "Dean Phillips: How to Regain Trust After the Biden Coverup", The Wall Street Journal, May 22, 2025
- "DEAN PHILLIPS: We can fix immigration enforcement without fueling chaos or lawlessness", Fox News, February 4, 2026

U.S. House of Representatives
Preceded by Erik Paulsen	Member of the U.S. House of Representatives from Minnesota's 3rd congressional district 2019–2025	Succeeded by Kelly Morrison
U.S. order of precedence (ceremonial)
Preceded by Mark Kennedy as Former U.S. Representative	Order of precedence of the United States as Former U.S. Representative	Succeeded by Tim Huelskamp as Former U.S. Representative
