= The Cold Within =

Poem by James Patrick Kinney

The Cold Within

Six humans trapped by happenstance
In bleak and bitter cold.
Each one possessed a stick of wood
Or so the story’s told.

Their dying fire in need of logs
The first man held his back
For of the faces round the fire
He noticed one was black.

The next man looking ‘cross the way
Saw one not of his church
And couldn't bring himself to give
The fire his stick of birch.

The third one sat in tattered clothes.
He gave his coat a hitch.
Why should his log be put to use
To warm the idle rich?

The rich man just sat back and thought
Of the wealth he had in store
And how to keep what he had earned
From the lazy shiftless poor.

The black man’s face bespoke revenge
As the fire passed from his sight.
For all he saw in his stick of wood
Was a chance to spite the white.

The last man of this forlorn group
Did nought except for gain.
Giving only to those who gave
Was how he played the game.

Their logs held tight in death’s still hands
Was proof of human sin.
They didn't die from the cold without
They died from the cold within.

"The Cold Within" is a poem written in the 1960s by American poet James Patrick Kinney. It has appeared in countless church bulletins, web sites and teaching seminars, as well as magazines and newspapers, including Dear Abby's column on 5 September 1999. His other popular works are A Better world, A poem, A Glimpse of Pioneer ways and Gone Camping (Eulogy to Johny). According to the poet's widow, he submitted the poem first to the Saturday Evening Post, but it was rejected as it was "too controversial for the time". Kinney sent it later to Liguorian, a Catholic magazine, which was the first commercial publication to print it.

According to Timothy Kinney, the poet's son, the poem was originally read at an ecumenical council meeting, after which the ministers, priests and rabbis in attendance requested copies of it. They read the poem to their congregations and, before long, "The Cold Within" became well known throughout the United States after the council meeting of all religions.

== The Cold within (introduction) ==
The poem displayed a strong message against racial discrimination, because of which it was called "too controversial for the time" before it reached the heights of fame. The poem is a simple but powerful reminder that if we selfishly hold on world's resources, and the wealth offered by it and we persist in discriminating on grounds of race, religion, caste, gender and ethnicity, we are all lost.

The message James Patrick Kinney gives is that harboring prejudices against each other will ultimately prove fatal. The poem teaches how in today's generation prejudices, malices, biases, discrimination and racism can destroy human beings and eventually the world. Therefore, the title was given to show that the group lacked the "warmth of humanity" in them and hence they died from "The Cold Within".
