= Dear Annie =

Dear Annie may refer to:

- Annie's Mailbox, an advice column written by Ann Landers' former editors from 2002 to 2016
- "Dear Annie", a story written by John Wagner
- Dear Annie, an advice column written by Annie Lane
- Dear Annie, Irish rapper Rejjie Snow’s debut studio album
