= Good Company (TV series) =

American television sitcom

- Genre: Sitcom
- Created by: Rob Long; Dan Staley
- Starring: Wendie Malick; Jason Beghe; Jon Tenney; Seymour Cassel; Lauren Graham; Timothy Fall
- Composer: Christophe Beck
- Country of origin: United States
- Original language: English
- No. of seasons: 1
- No. of episodes: 6

Production
- Running time: 30 minutes
- Production companies: Staley-Long Productions; Paramount Television

Original release
- Network: CBS
- Release: March 4 – April 22, 1996

Good Company is an American television sitcom that aired on CBS on Monday nights from March 4, 1996, to April 22, 1996.

== Synopsis ==
The series was set at the offices of Blanton, Booker & Hayden Agency, a Manhattan ad agency. Those seen were Zoe, the newly appointed creative director, Will, the art director, Jack, the senior copywriter, Jody, Jack's assistant, Ron, the account director, Liz, another copywriter, Dale, a junior art director, and Bobby the agency's president and CEO.

== Cast ==
- Wendie Malick as Zoe Hellstrom
- Jason Beghe as Ron Nash
- Jon Tenney as Will Hennessey
- Seymour Cassel as Jack O'Shea
- Timothy Fall as Jody
- Lauren Graham as Liz Gibson
- Elizabeth Anne Smith as Dale
- Terry Kiser as Bobby McDermott

== Episodes ==
| No. | Title | Directed by | Written by | Original release date | Prod. code |
|---|---|---|---|---|---|
| 1 | "10,000 Days" | Andy Ackerman | Dan Staley & Rob Long | March 4, 1996 | 101 |
| 2 | "Day 1038: Downsizing" | Pamela Fryman | Bob Sand | March 11, 1996 | 102 |
| 3 | "Day 1346: Friendship" | Rob Schiller | Bob Sand | March 18, 1996 | 106 |
| 4 | "Day 1304: Evaluation" | Pamela Fryman | Bob Sand | April 8, 1996 | 103 |
| 5 | "Day 1340: Death" | Rob Schiller | Howard Margulies | April 15, 1996 | 105 |
| 6 | "Day 1329: Revenge" | Tom Moore | Bob Keyes & Doug Keyes | April 22, 1996 | 104 |
