= Morris Mirkin =

American businessman

- Born: September 18, 1918 Sioux City, Iowa, United States
- Died: June 27, 1985 (aged 66) Beverly Hills, California, United States
- Allegiance: United States
- Known for: Founder of Budget Rent-a-Car
- Children: 7

Morris Mirkin (September 18, 1918 – June 27, 1985) was an American businessman who founded Budget Rent-a-Car.

== Biography ==
Mirkin was born to a Jewish family in Sioux City, Iowa, the son of immigrants from Russia. Mirkin served in the U.S. Air Force during World War II. In 1958, he opened the first Budget Rent-a-Car office at Wilshire and Robertson boulevards in Los Angeles. In 1960, he was joined by Jules Lederer and they incorporated the company as Budget Rent-a-Car Corporation. In 1968, they sold Budget to Transamerica Corporation.

Mirkin was a thoroughbred horse breeder with wins including the Hollywood Park Gold Cup and the All-American Handicap at Golden Gate Fields.

== Personal life ==
Mirkin was married to Judith Carole Lindenberg on March 9, 1952, and they had three children; Jeffrey Randall Mirkin, Margaux Karen Mirkin and Mitchell Anthony Mirkin. They were divorced in 1976. Mirkin married Claudia Mirkin in 1978; she has four children. He died of cancer on June 27, 1985, at his home in Beverly Hills. Services were held at Hillside Memorial Park Cemetery.

Mirkin established the Morris Mirkin Foundation which was dedicated to helping children with learning disabilities.
