= Budget Rent a Car =

American car rental brand

Budget Rent a Car System, Inc.

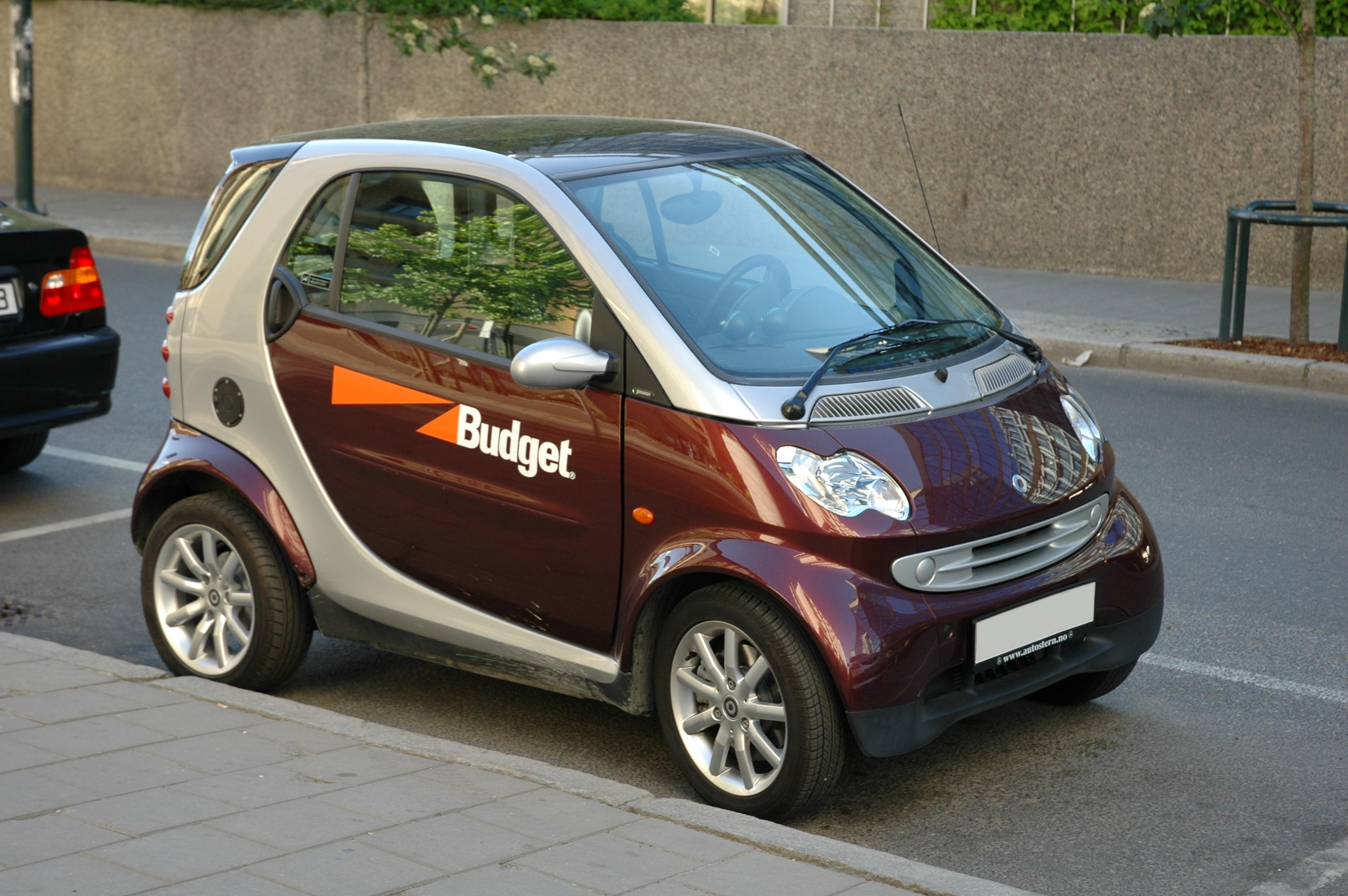
- Smart Fortwo rental from Budget
- Type: Subsidiary
- Industry: Car rental
- Founded: 1958; 68 years ago, in Los Angeles
- Founders: Morris Mirkin; Jules Lederer
- Headquarters: Parsippany, New Jersey, United States
- Number of locations: ≥ 3700 (2025)
- Revenue: US$4.3 billion (2025)
- Parent: Avis Budget Group
- Website: www.budget.com

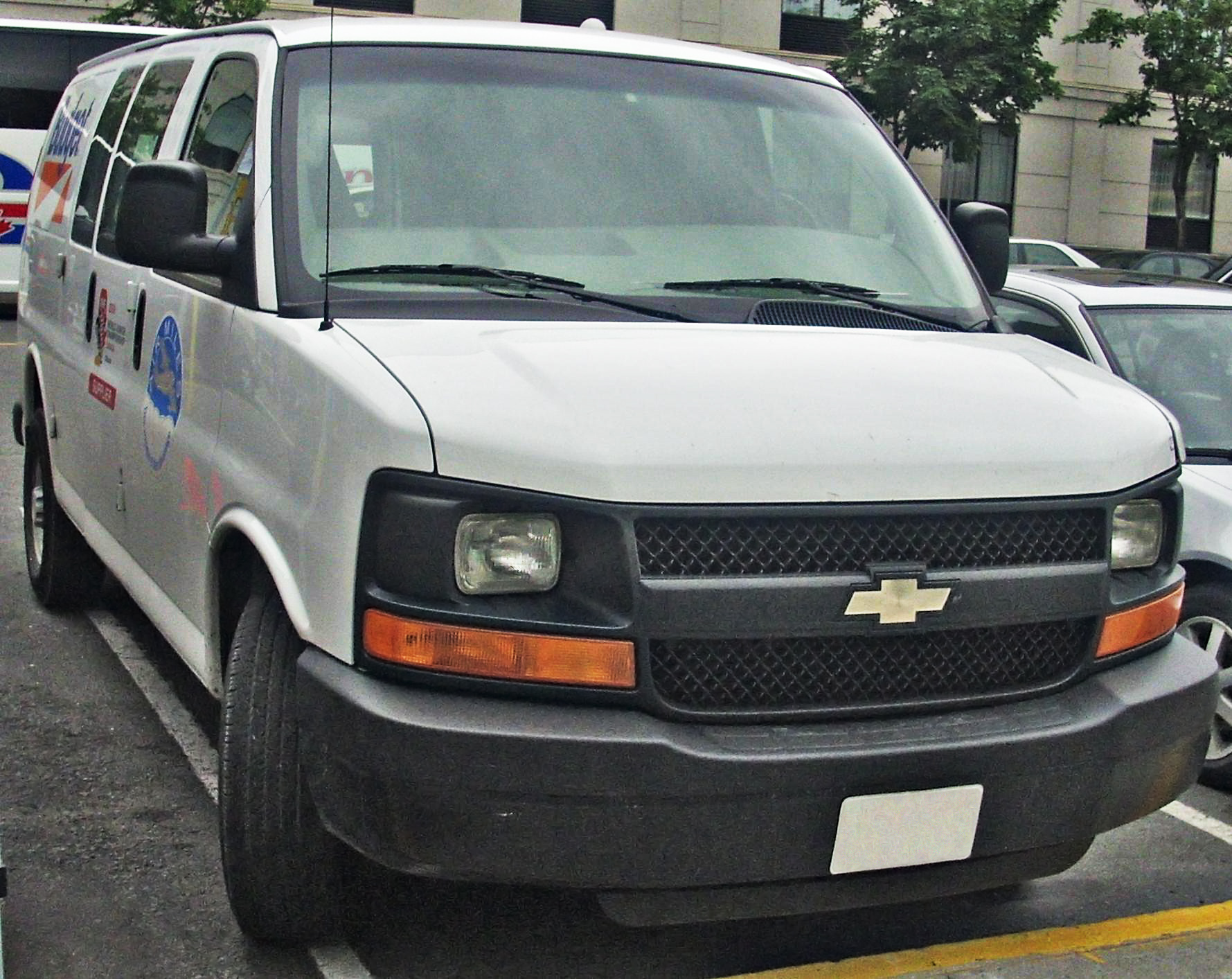
Chevrolet Express wagon from Budget Rent-A-Car (Toronto)

Budget Rent a Car System, Inc. is an American car rental company that was founded in 1958 in Los Angeles, California by Morris Mirkin. Budget is a subsidiary of the Avis Budget Group, with its operations headquartered in Parsippany, New Jersey.

== History ==
With its original fleet of 10 cars, the company lived up to the 'Budget' name by undercutting the daily and per mile rental rates of the established airport based car rental companies. Mirkin was joined in 1959 by Julius Lederer and together, they built the company internationally. In 1960, the headquarters moved to Chicago, Illinois and the rental fleet expanded with franchised and wholly owned rental outlets.

The company was eventually acquired by Transamerica Corporation, and then sold in 1986 in a leveraged buyout by Gibbons, Green and van Amerongen Ltd., along with management (led by CEO Clifton E. Haley) and selected investors. The company made its first public stock offering in 1987.

Team Rental Group purchased the public company in 1997 and took the name Budget Group. In 2002, Budget filed for bankruptcy and was later sold to the Cendant Corporation, which also owned Avis. In September 2006, Cendant Corporation separated into four independent companies. The real estate division became Realogy, Inc., its hospitality services division became Wyndham Worldwide, and the travel distribution services division became Travelport, Inc., an affiliate of The Blackstone Group. In 2006, following the Travelport sale, Cendant—composed solely of its vehicle rental services businesses—renamed itself Avis Budget Group.

== Locations ==
As of 2019, there are 2,275 locations that are company owned worldwide, and 1,650 are licensees. There are 1,925 offices located in the Americas, and 2,000 located internationally.

== Spokespersons ==
Beginning in April 2011, television actress Wendie Malick of Hot in Cleveland became the spokesperson in a series of television and online ads that offer special, limited-time, discount offers.

== See also ==
- Bob Ansett – Budget Australia's owner
