= Eppie Lederer =

American journalist

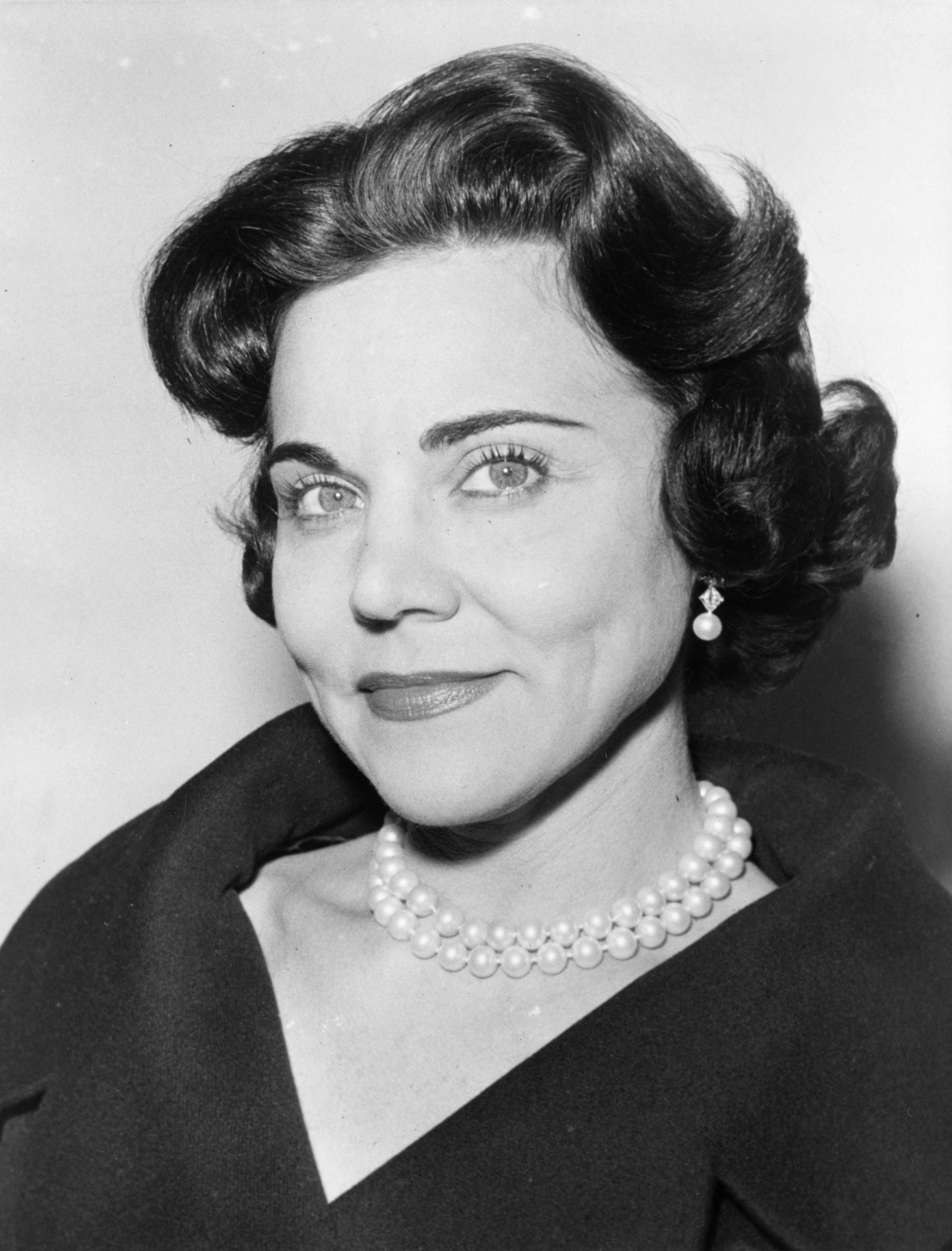
- Publicity photo in 1961
- Born: Esther Pauline Friedman; July 4, 1918; Sioux City, Iowa, U.S.
- Died: June 22, 2002 (aged 83); Chicago, Illinois, U.S.
- Other name: Ann Landers
- Education: Morningside College
- Occupations: Personal advice columnist, author, radio host
- Spouse: Jules Lederer (m. 1939; div. 1975)
- Children: Margo Howard
- Relatives: Pauline Phillips (twin sister)

Esther Pauline "Eppie" Lederer (née Friedman; July 4, 1918 – June 22, 2002), better known by the pen name Ann Landers, was an American advice columnist and eventually a nationwide media celebrity. She began writing the "Ask Ann Landers" column in 1955 and continued for 47 years, by which time its readership was 90 million people. A 1978 World Almanac survey named her the most influential woman in the United States. She was the identical twin sister of Pauline Phillips, who wrote the similarly popular "Dear Abby" advice column as Abigail Van Buren.

Lederer was a profile-raiser for several medical charities, and in 1977 President Jimmy Carter appointed her to a six-year term on a cancer advisory board.

== Early life and relationship with sister Pauline ==
Born in Sioux City, Iowa, Esther Pauline and her identical twin sister Pauline Esther ("Popo", who was 17 minutes younger) were daughters of Russian Jewish immigrants Rebecca Friedman (née Rushall) and Abraham B. Friedman. They grew up in Sioux City and attended its Morningside College for three and a half years (1936–39), where they wrote a gossip column for the college's newspaper. Eppie majored in journalism and psychology.

During Lederer's career writing the Ann Landers column, her sister wrote a similar personal advice column, "Dear Abby", under the name Abigail Van Buren, which she initiated in San Francisco a few months after Eppie took over as Ann Landers in Chicago. As competing columnists they had a discordant relationship. They reconciled publicly in 1964, but acrimony between them persisted. In her July 8, 2017, "Dear Abby" column, Jeanne Phillips said her mother liked being a twin while her aunt wanted to be an individual, and this also caused conflict between them.

== Marriage and family life ==
Eppie and Popo were married to their husbands in a double-wedding ceremony on July 2, 1939. There were 750 guests, and hundreds more who stood outside to watch. Eppie was married to Jules Lederer, who became a business executive; Popo married Morton Phillips of Minneapolis.

Between 1945 and 1949, Lederer was chairwoman of the Minnesota-Wisconsin council of the Anti Defamation League.

== Eppie becomes Ann ==
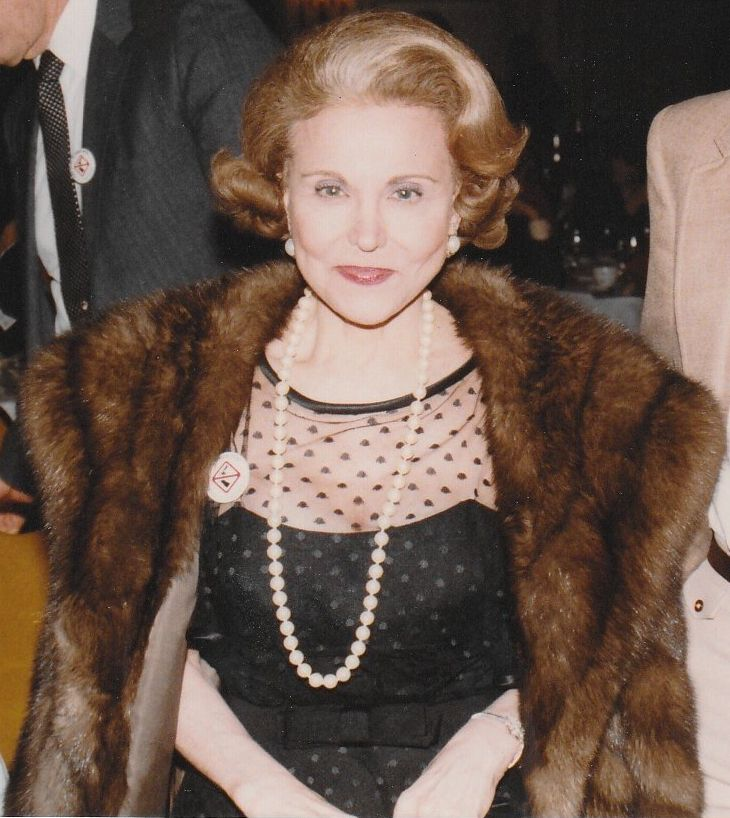
In Chicago, 1983

Ruth Crowley, the creator of the Chicago Sun-Times' "Ask Ann Landers" column, died in 1955. During her nine years writing the column, intermittently from 1943, Crowley's identity had been kept secret. Lederer won a contest to take over the column later that year, and took on the identity. Long before the end of her 47 years as Ann Landers, she had become a North American media celebrity, having appeared on television and traveled the continent to media and charity events. In her later years, Lederer began answering questions about homosexuality and other topics that had once been taboo in print. In a 1993 interview, she said she was happy for the dissolution of restrictions she had to work under in the 1950s.

She appeared on the March 18, 1956, episode of What's My Line?, signing in as Mrs. Jules Lederer.

From the early 1970s until her death, Lederer lived at 209 East Lake Shore Drive, in a 5,500-square-foot upper level apartment.

Jules and Eppie divorced in 1975. In her column of July 1, 1975, Lederer wrote, "The sad, incredible fact is, that after 36 years of marriage, Jules and I are being divorced." She received 30,000 sympathetic letters in response.

== Death ==
Lederer was in good health almost all her life. She was diagnosed with multiple myeloma in January 2002 and died on June 22, two weeks before what would have been her 84th birthday, having refused any medical treatment for her condition. Her former husband had died on January 21, 1999.

== Legacy ==
After Lederer's death, her longtime editors Kathy Mitchell and Marcy Sugar started writing the Annie's Mailbox column. Lederer's desk was purchased by Dan Savage, author of the relationship-and-sex advice column Savage Love.

In 2003, a collection of correspondence between Lederer and her daughter was published.

In 2006, David Rambo wrote a play about the life and work of Lederer as Ann Landers. The production was revived in 2008 at the Pasadena Playhouse in California, starring Mimi Kennedy.
