= Ruth Crowley (journalist) =

American nurse, writer, and TV personality (1906/1907–1955)

Ruth Crowley (1906 or 1907 – July 19, 1955) was an American nurse, newspaper writer, and television personality.

== Early years ==
Crowley was educated in the public schools of Chicago and at Crane College, Northwestern University, and Rosary College.

== Career ==
Crowley was a registered nurse before she began working in journalism.

=== Newspapers ===
Crowley was a feature writer for the Chicago Sun-Times. In that role she originated the Ann Landers advice column, which she continued to write until her death. In 1941 she began writing a column about child care, and in 1943 she initiated a column of general advice. She used the pseudonym Ann Landers for it to avoid confusion between the two columns. She wrote the Landers column until 1948, took a break, and resumed it in 1951. At the time of Crowley's death, the Landers column was syndicated to 26 other newspapers.

=== Television ===
Crowley had two television programs in the 1950s. Women and the World was honored as the best women's TV program by the Chicago Federated Advertising Clubs in 1955. All About Baby began as a local weekday program on WBKB-TV in Chicago. In 1954 the Dumont network began carrying it one day per week, and it continued locally the other four days. She supplemented her own knowledge by having pediatricians and child-care experts appear on the latter show.

=== Child-care adviser ===
In addition to her All About Baby program, Crowley wrote several books for parents. She began learning about child care when her first child was born. "I didn't know how to hold it or bathe it," she said. "Although I was a registered nurse, I found I was afraid of the baby." That feeling motivated her to read about raising children, which in turn led her to write books that might help other mothers who found themselves in similar situations.

== Personal life and death ==
Crowley was married to attorney William J. Crowley, and they had three children. Her daughter, Diane Crowley, began writing an advice column for the Sun Times in 1987 when the Landers column moved to the Chicago Tribune.

She died in Lake Forest Hospital in Lake Forest, Illinois, on July 19, 1955, aged 48 after a brief illness.
