= Ask Ann Landers =

American newspaper advice column

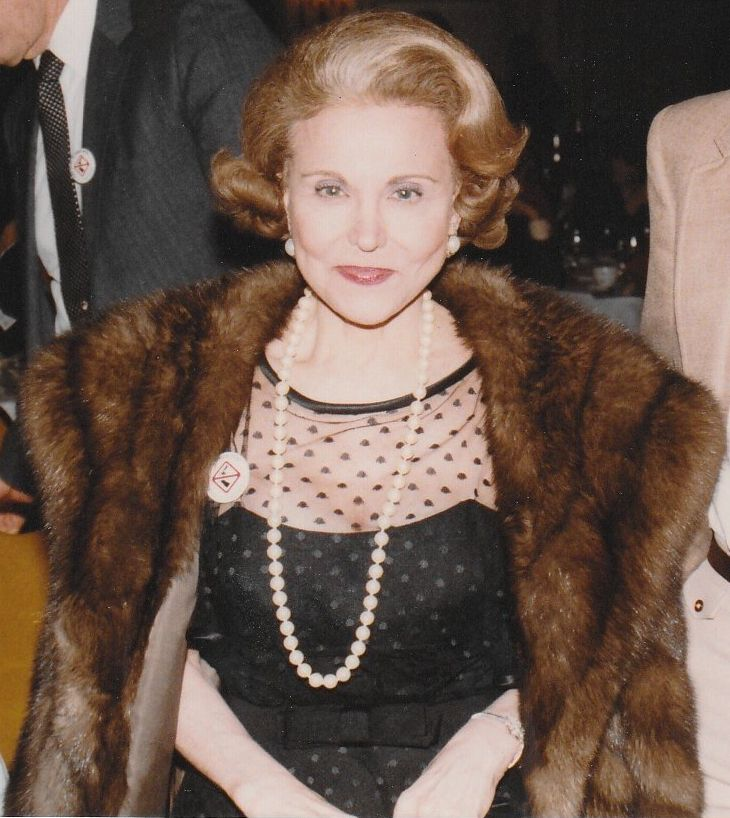
Eppie Lederer, a.k.a. Ann Landers, in Chicago, 1983

Ann Landers was a pen name created by Chicago Sun-Times advice columnist Ruth Crowley in 1943 and taken over by Esther Pauline "Eppie" Lederer in 1955. For 56 years, the Ask Ann Landers syndicated advice column was a regular feature in many newspapers across North America. Owing to this popularity, "Ann Landers", though fictional, is now considered a national institution and cultural icon.

== The Ruth Crowley years (1943–1947, 1952–1955) ==
The creator of the "Ann Landers" pseudonym was Ruth Crowley, a Chicago nurse who had been writing a child-care column for the Chicago Sun newspaper since 1941. On March 29, 1943, Crowley began writing a second column in which she gave advice. She used the name "Ann Landers", taken from a family friend Bill Landers, so as not to confuse the two columns. Unlike her eventual successor Esther Lederer, Crowley kept her identity as Landers secret, even enjoining her children to help her keep it quiet. Crowley took a three-year break from writing the column from 1948 until 1951. After 1951, she continued the column for the Chicago Sun-Times which had begun to syndicate it to 26 other newspapers. Crowley continued to write the column until her death, at 48, on July 20, 1955. In all, she spent a total of nine years writing advice as "Ann Landers". She also was featured as the host (billed under her real name) of the 1953–1955 DuMont Television Network informational daytime series All About Baby.

In the three-month period after Crowley's death, various writers, including Connie Chancellor, took over the column.

== The Esther Lederer years (1955–2002) ==
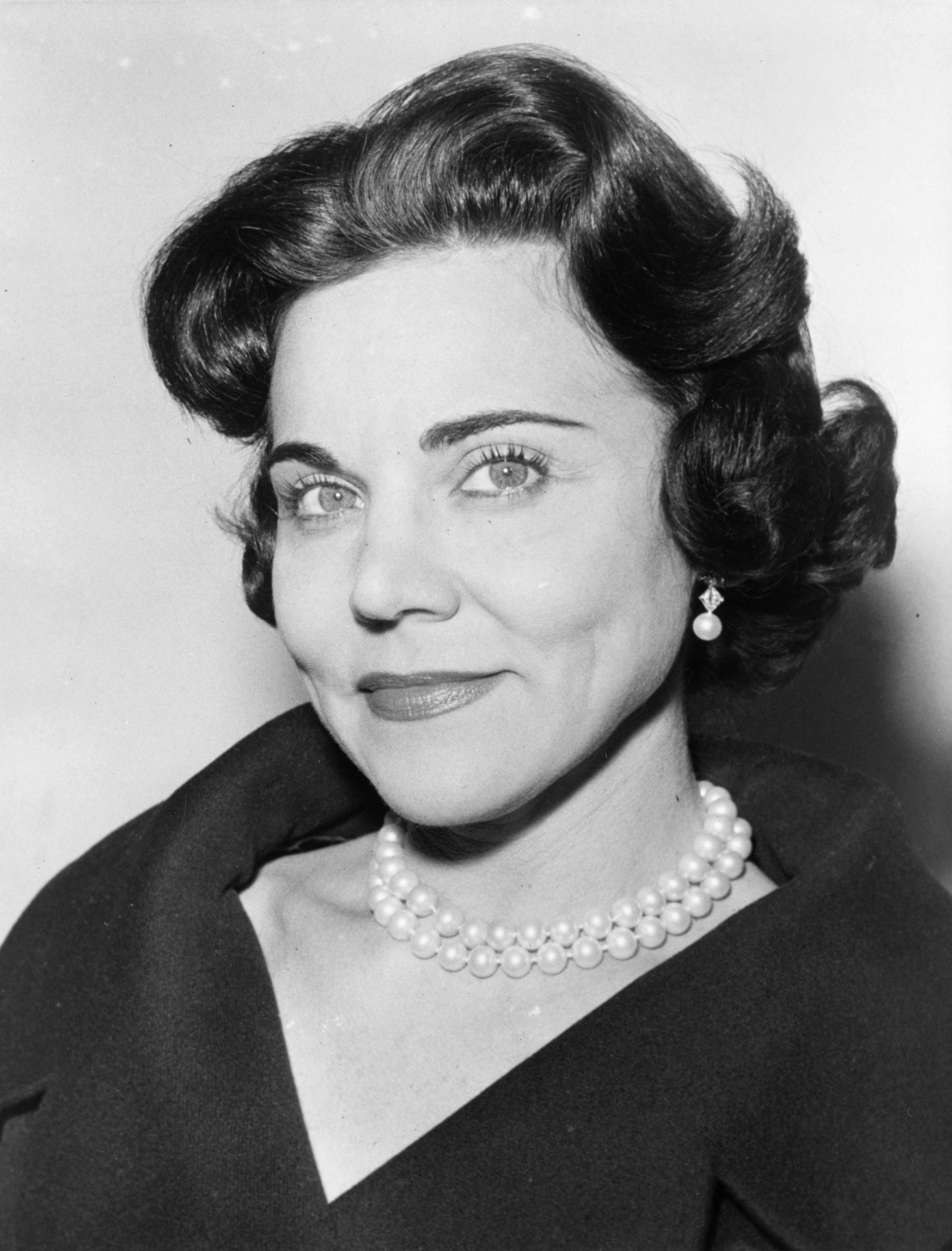
Esther "Eppie" Pauline Friedman Lederer, a.k.a. 'Ann Landers', 1961

The Chicago Sun-Times held a contest to find the next writer of the column. Eppie Lederer was chosen as the winner because her sample columns included advice from experts, including the Supreme Court Justice William O. Douglas. Her debut column on October 16, 1955 column opened with a letter from a "Non-Eligible Bachelor" who despaired of getting married. Her advice was, "You're a big boy now...don't let spite ruin your life." Lederer went on to advise thousands of other readers over the next several decades. Eventually, she became owner of the copyright.

News America Syndicate distributed the Landers column before it was sold to King Features, and Landers moved to the new Creators Syndicate. On February 13, 1987, after years of seeking to run the column, the Chicago Tribune announced the Landers column was moving there, and the Sun-Times replaced her with Ruth Crowley's daughter Diane Crowley and Jeff Zaslow of The Wall Street Journal.

In 1985, the attorney general of Illinois, Neil Hartigan, wrote to Ask Ann Landers requesting assistance in dispelling the hoax that a film was going to depict Jesus as gay. Lederer replied that "Hoaxes die hard, and the zanier the hoax, the more difficult it is to try to convince people that it is not true". She advised readers not to believe the hoax.

Lederer chose not to have a different writer continue the column after her death, so the "Ann Landers" column ceased after publication of the few weeks' worth of material which she had written before her death.

Sometimes she expressed unpopular opinions. She repeatedly favored legalization of prostitution and was pro-choice on abortion, yet denounced atheist Madalyn Murray O'Hair. In 1973, she wrote in support of the legalization of homosexual acts, saying that she had been "pleading for compassion and understanding and equal rights for homosexuals" for 18 years, and wrote in 1976 that she "fought for the civil rights of homosexuals 20 years ago and argued that they should be regarded as full and equal citizens". Nevertheless, for years, she described homosexuality as "unnatural", a "sickness" and a "dysfunction". Not till 1992 did she eventually reverse her opinion, and even then only after reviewing research and receiving nearly 75,000 letters that gay and lesbian readers wrote to her saying that they were happy being gay; she wrote that "it is my firm conviction that homosexuality is not learned behavior", adding that while being gay could be suppressed, it could not be altered.

Even so, in 1996, she wrote regarding gay marriage, "Before you gay-rights folks land on me with both feet ... I cannot support same-sex marriage, however, because it flies in the face of cultural and traditional family life as we have known it for centuries."

=== Controversies ===
==== Pope John Paul II and Joseph P. Kennedy Sr. ====
In 1995, Lederer commented thus in The New Yorker about Pope John Paul II: "He has a sweet sense of humor. Of course, he's a Polack. They're very anti-women." Polish Americans responded with outrage. She issued a formal apology, but refused to comment further. The Milwaukee Journal Sentinel canceled her column after that incident. In the same article she noted that President John F. Kennedy's father, Joseph P. Kennedy Sr., was anti-Semitic.

==== Halloween candy panic ====
A 1995 "Ann Landers" column said, "In recent years, there have been reports of people with twisted minds putting razor blades and poison in taffy apples and Halloween candy. It is no longer safe to let your child eat treats that come from strangers." The vague warning was criticized for causing fear dishonestly, as there have been no documented cases of children receiving poisoned candy during door-to-door Halloween trick-or-treating.

==== Mistaken legal advice ====
In her March 28, 1965, column, regarding ownership of wedding gifts, Lederer wrote that "the wedding gifts belong to the bride." She went on to state that the bride should "consult a lawyer about the checks. In some states this could be considered community property." The advice was mistaken because only gifts given after the marriage would be considered community property in some states (or else because wedding gifts—if so designated—can be considered back-dated gifts to the bride). The response also fails to explain why checks should be treated any differently from any other property that was given as a wedding gift. The column has provided teaching material for law professors and law students.

==== Wedding rice and birds ====
In a 1996 column, she "informed" her readers that they should avoid throwing rice at weddings, lest birds eat it and explode. Such advice was erroneous, as milled rice is not harmful to birds. She later recanted.

== Annie's Mailbox ==
After Lederer died in June 2002, her last column ran on July 27. Lederer's daughter Margo Howard (who wrote Dear Prudence) said the column would end, according to Lederer's wishes. Creators Syndicate President Rick Newcombe said Lederer's editors, Kathy Mitchell and Marcy Sugar, should start a column of their own. Though Mitchell and Sugar were reluctant, many readers wanted the column to continue. Thus, the Annie's Mailbox column began on July 28, 2002, in approximately 800 newspapers. Newspapers were given three possible choices: In addition to Annie's Mailbox, classic Ask Ann Landers, and Dear Prudence. In 2016, the authors responded to a reader question by saying, "[T]here are two of us, and neither of us is named 'Annie.' ... The Mailbox was named in honor of Ann Landers, with whom we both worked for many years. Hence it is 'Annie's Mailbox' with an apostrophe. ... After all, there can be only one Ann Landers. We simply do the best we can to honor her legacy."

Annie's Mailbox was syndicated in numerous newspapers throughout the US until June 30, 2016. On that date, Mitchell and Sugar wrote "...we say farewell. It is time for us to step aside and take advantage of opportunities neither of us has had the time for until now." They also introduced columnist Annie Lane, known as Dear Annie.

== Dear Abby ==
A few months after Eppie Lederer took over as Ann Landers, her twin sister Pauline Esther "PoPo" Phillips introduced a similar, competing column, Dear Abby, using the pseudonym "Abigail Van Buren", which produced a lengthy estrangement between the two sisters. Phillips wrote her column until retiring in 2002, at which time her daughter, Jeanne Phillips, took over.
