= Pauline Phillips =

American advice columnist (1918–2013)

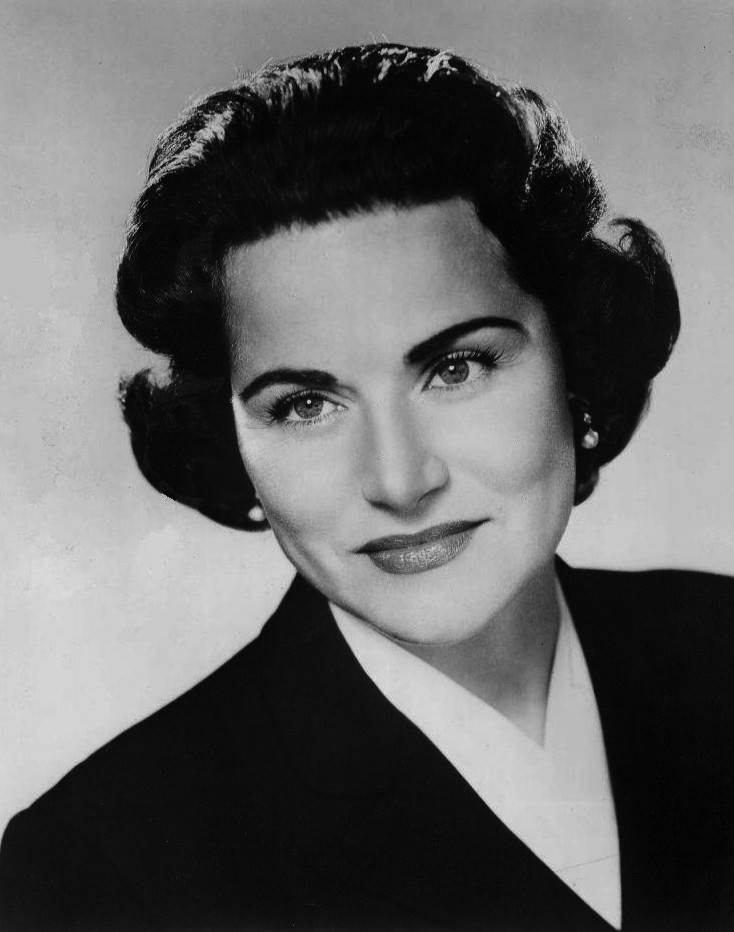
- Publicity photo, 1961
- Born: Pauline Esther Friedman; July 4, 1918; Sioux City, Iowa, U.S.
- Died: January 16, 2013 (aged 94); Minneapolis, Minnesota, U.S.
- Education: Morningside College
- Occupations: Personal advice columnist; author; radio host
- Spouse: Morton Phillips (m. 1939)
- Children: 2, including Jeanne
- Relatives: Esther Pauline "Eppie" Lederer (twin sister); Dean Phillips (grandson)
- Writing career
- Pen name: Abigail Van Buren ("Dear Abby")
- Website: dearabby.com

Pauline Esther Phillips (née Friedman; July 4, 1918 – January 16, 2013), also known as Abigail Van Buren, was an American advice columnist and radio show host who began the well-known Dear Abby newspaper column in 1956. It became the most widely syndicated newspaper column in the world, syndicated in 1,400 newspapers with 110 million readers.

From 1963 to 1975, Phillips also hosted a daily Dear Abby program on CBS Radio. TV anchorwoman Diane Sawyer calls her the "pioneering queen of salty advice". She was also the paternal stepgrandmother of U.S. Congressman Dean Phillips.

== Early life ==
Pauline Friedman, nicknamed "Popo", was born in Sioux City, Iowa, to Russian Jewish immigrants Rebecca (née Rushall) and Abraham B. Friedman, owner of a chain of movie theaters. She was the youngest of four sisters and grew up in Sioux City. Her identical twin was Esther Pauline Friedman (married name Lederer), nicknamed “Eppie”. (Note: Her sister Eppie Lederer was columnist Ann Landers. Lederer had become Ann Landers in 1955, and Phillips soon followed suit by launching her own advice column.)

Phillips graduated from the now-defunct Central High School in Sioux City. She then studied journalism and psychology at Morningside College, where she and her twin sister wrote a gossip column in the school newspaper. The column was called "The Campus Rat", and they used the pen name "PE-EP", inspired by their names Pauline Esther and Esther Pauline. Both sisters were married in a double wedding ceremony on July 2, 1939, two days before their 21st birthday. Pauline married Morton Phillips of Minneapolis, and had son Edward and daughter Jeanne.

== Career ==
Phillips' writing career began in January 1956 when she was 37 and new to the San Francisco area. She phoned the editor of the San Francisco Chronicle and said that she could write a better advice column than the one that she had been reading in the newspaper. After hearing her modest credentials, editor Stanleigh Arnold gave her some letters in need of answers and told her to bring back her replies in a week; Phillips got her replies back to the Chronicle in an hour and a half. In an interview with Larry King, she said that she had no work experience, lacking even a social security number. The editor, however, asked if she was a professional writer. He said that her writing was "fabulous', and she was hired that day.

She went by the pen name Abigail Van Buren, combining the Old Testament prophetess from 1 Samuel with President Martin Van Buren. Her twin sister was the author of the Ann Landers column, and the competition created acrimony between them for many years. In 1956, Phillips offered her column to the Sioux City Journal at a reduced price, provided that the paper refuse to print her sister's column. The sisters ostensibly reconciled in 1964 but remained competitors. They became "the most widely read and most quoted women in the world" in 1958, according to Life magazine.

=== Writing style ===
Newspapers had included gossip and personal columnists for more than a century, but the two sisters added "something special", according to Life, in that they were the first to publish letters and replies covering a wide range of personal problems, replying with "vaudeville punch lines" rooted in common sense. The editor of the Chicago Sun-Times described their skill as "beyond mere shrewdness—a quality very close to genuine wisdom."

With her comic and flinty yet fundamentally sympathetic voice, Mrs. Phillips helped wrestle the advice column from its weepy Victorian past into a hard-nosed 20th-century present.

Phillips stated that she did not publish the most sensitive letters that she received, but instead replied to them individually. Sometimes she would write a brief note on the letter itself, letting one of her secretaries respond fully using her advice. If a person seemed suicidal from their letter, she would call them on the phone.

== Personal life and beliefs ==
Phillips was considered "the embodiment of female orthodoxy." This attitude carried over into her column in the late 1950s, and she considered women "faintly ridiculous" if they were unable to make their marriages work. Her "code of conduct" was "husband and children first." In her later years, she did not avoid suggesting divorce when a relationship became "intolerable", and considered how a bad marriage might affect children: "When kids see parents fighting, or even sniping at each other, I think it is terribly damaging."

Phillips supported gay rights, and season 1, episode 8 of the podcast Making Gay History is about her.

Both Phillips and her sister enjoyed socializing with celebrities, and because of their fame, celebrities liked being seen with them. Among Phillips' friends soon after she began her column were politicians, including Senators Hubert Humphrey and Herbert Lehman; and entertainers, including Jerry Lewis and Dean Martin. They also admired Bishop Fulton Sheen, whom they met when learning about Catholicism while studying about other religions. The bishop admired them both in return due to their ability to remain "unawed" and unaffected by the fame of others. Phillips was Jewish, and she commented: "He's one of the greatest men I ever met, but he'll be a Jew before I'm a Catholic."

Phillips was an honorary member of Women in Communications, the American College of Psychiatrists, and the National Council of Jewish Women. Her columns were collected in Dear Abby, Dear Teenager, Dear Abby on Marriage, Where Were You When President Kennedy was Shot?, The Dear Abby Wedding Planner, and The Best of Dear Abby. She said that writing is "only work if you'd rather be doing something else." She co-wrote the column with her daughter Jeanne from 1987 until her retirement. In 2002, Phillips' Alzheimer's disease made it impossible for her to continue writing, and Jeanne assumed all the writing responsibilities of Dear Abby.

== Death ==
Phillips died on January 16, 2013, at age 94, after battling Alzheimer's for 11 years. She was survived by her husband of 73 years, Morton Phillips, daughter Jeanne Phillips, four grandchildren, and two great-grandchildren. Her son, Edward, had died two years prior.

== Bibliography ==
=== Books about Dear Abby ===
- Aronson, Virginia (2000). Ann Landers and Abigail Van Buren. Women of achievement. Philadelphia: Chelsea House Publishers. ISBN 0-7910-5297-4. (Children's book).
- Pottker, Janice; Speziale, Bob (1987). Dear Ann, Dear Abby: The Unauthorized Biography of Ann Landers and Abigail Van Buren. New York: Dodd, Mead. ISBN 0-396-08906-2.

=== Books by Abigail Van Buren ===
- Dear Abby. Illustrated by Carl Rose. Englewood Cliffs, N.J.: Prentice-Hall, [1958].
- Dear teen-ager. Illustrated by Roy Doty. [New York]: B. Geis Associates; distributed by Random House [1959].
- Dear Abby on marriage. New York: McGraw-Hill, [1962].
- The Best of Dear Abby. Kansas City: Andrews and McMeel, 1981. ISBN 0-8362-7907-7; 081613362X (lg. print.)
- Dear Abby on planning your wedding. Andrews and McMeel, c1988. ISBN 0-8362-7943-3.
- Where were you when President Kennedy was shot?: memories and tributes to a slain president as told to Dear Abby. Foreword by Pierre Salinger. Andrews and McMeel, c. 1993. ISBN 0-8362-6246-8.

== See also ==
- List of newspaper columnists
- Poisoned candy scare
