= Dear Abby =

American advice column

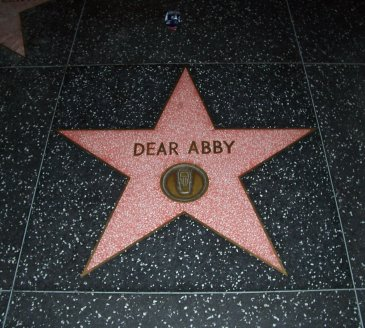
Dear Abby star on the Hollywood Walk of Fame memorializing the Dear Abby radio show

Dear Abby is an American advice column founded in 1956 by Pauline Phillips under the pen name "Abigail Van Buren" and carried on until July 2026 by her daughter, Jeanne Phillips, who now owns the legal rights to the pen name. It is currently written by members of an editorial staff.

== History ==
Pauline Phillips said her pen name, "Abigail Van Buren", comes from the Biblical figure Abigail in the Book of Samuel and the former US president Martin Van Buren.

The Dear Abby column was syndicated by the McNaught Syndicate from 1956 until 1966, when it moved to Universal Press Syndicate. Dear Abby's current syndication company claims the column is "well-known for sound, compassionate advice, delivered with the straightforward style of a good friend." By 1987, over 1,200 newspapers ran the column.

=== Ask Ann Landers ===
Abby was born Pauline Esther Friedman, and her twin sister was born Esther Pauline Friedman. Pauline was known as Popo, and her sister was Eppie (a nickname from E.P.). Pauline Phillips started her Dear Abby column a few months after her twin sister, Eppie Lederer, took over the Ask Ann Landers column. This produced a rivalry and lengthy estrangement between the two sisters.

On February 13, 1987, the Chicago Tribune announced that the Ann Landers column was moving to the Tribune, which had published the Dear Abby column for years. The Tribune ran both columns, Landers every day and Abby six days a week.

In comparing the columns written by each of the sisters, the Jewish Women's Archive wrote that "Both columns were characterized by a straightforward tone, practical advice, and a firm but modern moral sensibility" and that "both women used humor, including sarcasm and one-liners, in their responses."

=== Authorship changes ===
Pauline Phillips wrote the column herself until 1987, at which time her daughter, Jeanne Phillips, began writing the column with her. In December 2000, the elder Phillips wrote a column identifying her daughter as her "co-creator" and added, "I will continue to work on this column until my Maker calls me home." Twenty months later, the Phillips family revealed that Pauline was suffering from Alzheimer's disease.

Although the change in authorship took place in 2000, the official statement—which included adding "Dear Abby is written by Abigail Van Buren, also known as Jeanne Phillips, and was founded by her mother, Pauline Phillips" to the bottom of each column—was not made until July 2002.

Pauline Phillips died on January 16, 2013, aged 94.

On July 27, 2026, Jeanne Phillips announced that she would retire and leave Dear Abby in the hands of her syndication editorial team.

== Impact ==
Dear Abby (which had a readership estimated at 110 million in 2016) was described by The New York Times as "a staple in American households for decades" and has also been accused of being out of step with changing times. A 2016 column claimed a "breakdown of communication" led to the sexual assault of a teen girl. A 2018 column which said that, due to possible teasing and difficulty pronouncing, traditional Western names may be preferable for mixed-race newborns being raised in a Western country, gave rise to accusations of xenophobia.

== See also ==
- Sweet Revenge (John Prine album) includes the song "Dear Abby"
