= 1949–50 United States network television schedule (daytime) =

Talk shows are highlighted in yellow, local programming is white, reruns of prime-time programming are orange, game shows are pink, soap operas are chartreuse, news programs are gold and all others are light blue. New series are highlighted in bold.

All Monday–Friday Shows for all networks beginning in September 1949. In many cases, during hours when "Local Programming"is listed, stations may have been running test patterns or might have been off the air.

NOTE: This page is missing info on the DuMont Network, which started daytime transmission before any other United States television network.

== Fall 1949 ==
	10:30 am	11:00 am	11:30 am	noon	12:30 pm	1:00 pm	1:30 pm	2:00 pm	2:30 pm	3:00 pm	3:30 pm	4:00 pm	4:30 pm	5:00 pm	5:30 pm	6:00 pm
ABC	local programming
CBS	local programming	**U.N. General Assembly Sessions** (from 11/7)				local programming			2:30: local programming 2:45: Classified Column (to 12/9)	**U.N. General Assembly Sessions** (from 11/7) 3:45 Classified Column (from 12/12)		**Homemaker's Exchange** (from 10/10)	Vanity Fair (from 10/10)	Vanity Fair (to 10/7) / The Ted Steele Show (from 10/10)	The Chuck Wagon
NBC	local programming													5:00: local programming 5:15: **Judy Splinters**	Howdy Doody	**Cactus Jim** (from 10/31)
DMN	TV Shopper	?				Okay, Mother	?

== Winter 1949-1950 ==
	10:30 am	11:00 am	11:30 am	noon	12:30 pm	1:00 pm	1:30 pm	2:00 pm	2:30 pm	3:00 pm	3:30 pm	4:00 pm	4:30 pm	5:00 pm	5:30 pm	6:00 pm
ABC	local programming
CBS	local programming										3:30 local programming 3:45 Classified Column (to 1/13)	Homemaker's Exchange	Vanity Fair	5:00 The Ted Steele Show 5:15 local programming	The Chuck Wagon
NBC	local programming													5:00: local programming 5:15: Judy Splinters	Howdy Doody	Cactus Jim
DMN	TV Shopper	?				Okay, Mother	?

== Spring 1950 ==
	10:30 am	11:00 am	11:30 am	noon	12:30 pm	1:00 pm	1:30 pm	2:00 pm	2:30 pm	3:00 pm	3:30 pm	4:00 pm	4:30 pm	5:00 pm	5:30 pm	6:00 pm
ABC	local programming													5:00 **Mr Magic and J.J.** (W Th F) 5:15 local programming	local programming
CBS	local programming											Homemaker's Exchange	Vanity Fair	5:00 The Ted Steele Show (to 4/28) 5:15 local programming	The Chuck Wagon
NBC	local programming													5:00: local programming 5:15: Judy Splinters	Howdy Doody	Cactus Jim
DMN	TV Shopper	?				Okay, Mother	?

== Summer 1950 ==
	10:30 am	11:00 am	11:30 am	noon	12:30 pm	1:00 pm	1:30 pm	2:00 pm	2:30 pm	3:00 pm	3:30 pm	4:00 pm	4:30 pm	5:00 pm	5:30 pm	6:00 pm
ABC	local programming													5:00 Mr Magic and J.J. (W Th F) 5:15 local programming	local programming
CBS	local programming											Homemaker's Exchange	Vanity Fair	local programming	The Chuck Wagon
NBC	local programming													5:00: local programming 5:15: **Hanson Baldwin's War News Digest** (from 7/31)	Howdy Doody	Cactus Jim
DMN	TV Shopper	?				Okay, Mother	?

== By network ==
=== ABC ===
**Returning Series**

**New Series**

- **Mr Magic and J.J.**

**Not Returning From 1948 to 1949**

- Cartoon Teletales
- The Singing Lady

=== CBS ===
**Returning Series**

- The Chuck Wagon
- Classifield Column
- The Ted Steele Show
- Vanity Fair

**New Series**

- **Homemaker's Exchange**
- **U.N. General Assembly Sessions**

**Not Returning From 1948 to 1949**

- The Adventures of Lucky Pup
- Ladies Day
- The Missus Goes a-Shopping
- This Is the Missus

=== NBC ===
**Returning Series**

- Howdy Doody

**New Series**

- **Cactus Jim**
- **Henson Baldwin's War News Digest**
- **Judy Splinters**

**Not Returning From 1948 to 1949**

- Here's Archer
- These Are My Children
- Western Balladeer

=== DuMont ===
**Returning series**

- Okay, Mother
- TV Shopper

**New Series**

**Not Returning From 1948 to 1949**

- Amanda
- Camera Headlines
- Fashions in Song
- Johnny Olson's Rumpus Room
- The Magic Cottage
- Man in the Street
- Russ Hodges' Scoreboard
- Vincent Lopez Speaking
- Welcome, Neighbors
- The Wendy Barrie Show
- A Woman to Remember

== See also ==
- 1949-50 United States network television schedule (prime-time)

== Sources ==
- https://web.archive.org/web/20071015122215/http://curtalliaume.com/abc_day.html
- https://web.archive.org/web/20071015122235/http://curtalliaume.com/cbs_day.html
- https://web.archive.org/web/20071012211242/http://curtalliaume.com/nbc_day.html
