= 1948–49 United States network television schedule (daytime) =

Talk shows are highlighted in yellow, local programming is white, reruns of prime-time programming are orange, game shows are pink, soap operas are chartreuse, news programs are gold and all others are light blue. New series are highlighted in bold.

== Monday-Friday ==
		10:00 am	10:30 am	11:00 am	11:30 am	noon	12:30 pm	1:00 pm	1:30 pm	2:00 pm	2:30 pm	3:00 pm	3:30 pm	4:00 pm	4:30 pm	5:00 pm	5:30 pm	6:00 pm	6:30 pm
ABC	Fall	local programming															The Singing Lady	local programming
ABC	November	local programming															**Cartoon Teletales** (M W) / The Singing Lady (Tu Th)	local programming
ABC	Winter	local programming
CBS	Fall	local programming						**Vanity Fair** (Tu Th) / This Is the Missus	The Missus Goes a-Shopping / **Ladies Day**	local programming									6:30 PM: The Adventures of Lucky Pup 6:45 PM: local programming
CBS	Winter	local programming						Ladies Day (MWF)	Ladies Day / Vanity Fair (M Tu Th F)	local programming							**The Chuck Wagon**		6:30 PM: The Adventures of Lucky Pup 6:45 PM: local programming
CBS	February	local programming						Ladies Day (MWF)	Vanity Fair (M Tu Th F)	local programming							**The Chuck Wagon**		6:30 PM: The Adventures of Lucky Pup 6:45 PM: local programming
CBS	Spring	local programming				Ladies Day	Vanity Fair (MWF)	local programming									The Chuck Wagon	local programming	6:30 PM: The Adventures of Lucky Pup 6:45 PM: local programming
CBS	Summer	local programming				**The Ted Steele Show**	Vanity Fair (MWF)	local programming									The Chuck Wagon		6:30 PM: The Adventures of Lucky Pup 6:45 PM: local programming
CBS	July	local programming									2:30: local programming 2:45: **Classified Column** (from 7/25)	local programming				5:00: local programming 5:15: **Classified Column** (from 7/25)	The Chuck Wagon		6:30 PM: The Adventures of Lucky Pup 6:45 PM: local programming
NBC	Fall	local programming															Howdy Doody	local programming
NBC	Winter	local programming														5:00: **These Are My Children** 5:15: **Western Balladeer** (variety)	Howdy Doody	local programming
NBC	Spring	local programming														Western Balladeer (M F, then Tu Th from 5/9, at 5:15) / **Here's Archer** (Tu Th) (to 5:15)	Howdy Doody	local programming
NBC	Summer	local programming														5:00: Here's Archer (Tu Th) 5:15: Western Balladeer (Tu Th)	Howdy Doody	local programming
NBC	July	local programming															Howdy Doody	local programming
DMN	Fall	?																	6:30 PM: Russ Hodges' Scoreboard (F, to 6:45)
DMN	November	?	**TV Shopper** (since November 1)	?															6:30 PM: Russ Hodges' Scoreboard (F, to 6:45)
DMN	Winter	**Johnny Olson's Rumpus Room**	Welcome, Neighbors	local programming		Man in the Street (to 12:15) / Amanda (from 12:15)	Camera Headlines (encore to 12:45) / Fashions in Song (from 12:45)	**Okay, Mother**	?		The Wendy Barrie Show	**A Woman to Remember** (to 3:15) / Vincent Lopez Speaking (from 3:15)	?						6:30 PM: Russ Hodges' Scoreboard (F, to 6:45)
DMN	Spring	**Johnny Olson's Rumpus Room**	TV Shopper	?	11:45: A Woman to Remember (to 12:00, until May 2)	?		**Okay, Mother**	?										6:30 PM: Russ Hodges' Scoreboard (F, to 6:45)
DMN	Late April	**Johnny Olson's Rumpus Room**	TV Shopper	?	11:45: A Woman to Remember (to 12:00, until May 2)	?		**Okay, Mother**	?
DMN	May	**Johnny Olson's Rumpus Room**	TV Shopper	?				**Okay, Mother**	?
DMN	July	**Johnny Olson's Rumpus Room**	TV Shopper	?				**Okay, Mother**	?										**The Magic Cottage** (since July 18)

There is some dispute as to the exact lineup on DuMont in the winter. The above listing is according to What Women Watched: Daytime Television in the 1950s (University of Texas Press, 2005) by Marsha Cassidy. This would create a conflict with some other sources that have TV Shopper still in the lineup at this time.

- On Dumont, Okay, Mother was previously aired on New York based WABD channel, then the network flagship station.

== By network ==
=== ABC ===
**Returning Series**

- The Singing Lady

**New Series**

- **Cartoon Teletales**

**Not Returning From 1947 to 1948**

=== CBS ===
**Returning Series**

- The Adventures of Lucky Pup
- The Missus Goes a-Shopping
- This Is the Missus

**New Series**

- **The Chuck Wagon**
- **Classifield Column**
- **Ladies Day**
- **The Ted Steele Show**
- **Vanity Fair**

**Not Returning From 1947 to 1948**

=== NBC ===
**Returning Series**

- Howdy Doody

**New Series**

- **Here's Archer**
- **These Are My Children**
- **Western Balladeer**

**Not Returning From 1947 to 1948**

- Playtime
- The Swift Home Service Club

=== DuMont ===
**Returning series**

- Amanda
- Camera Headlines
- Fashions in Song
- Man in the Street
- Russ Hodges' Scoreboard
- Vincent Lopez Speaking
- Welcome, Neighbors
- The Wendy Barrie Show

**New Series**

- **Johnny Olson's Rumpus Room**
- **The Magic Cottage**
- **Okay, Mother**
- **TV Shopper**
- **A Woman to Remember**

**Not Returning From 1947 to 1948**

- The Walter Compton News

== See also ==
- 1948-49 United States network television schedule (prime-time)

== Sources ==
- https://web.archive.org/web/20071015122215/http://curtalliaume.com/abc_day.html
- https://web.archive.org/web/20071015122235/http://curtalliaume.com/cbs_day.html
- https://web.archive.org/web/20071012211242/http://curtalliaume.com/nbc_day.html
- https://web.archive.org/web/20070803174527/http://soapoperahistory.com/daytime/series/womantoremember/index.htm
