= The Needle Shop =

- Presented by: Alice Burrows
- Country of origin: United States

Production
- Running time: 15 minutes

Original release
- Network: DuMont Television Network
- Release: November 1948 – December 1949

The Needle Shop is an early American television program which aired on the DuMont Television Network in a 15-minute timeslot on weekday afternoons. The program was broadcast from New York City television station WABD from November 1948 to December 1949.

== DuMont begins daytime programing ==
On November 1, 1948, DuMont began programming shows during daytime hours. As the only television network without a radio network, and since TV was cutting into radio audiences, ABC, CBS and NBC did not want to hurt their daytime radio profits. DuMont's core business was manufacturing TV sets, so they wanted to replace test patterns with live programs, since most shopping was done in the daytime hours, and programing would attract TV buyers. DuMont began selling daytime commercial spots for as little as $25, and businesses took advantage of the low rates.

The Needle Shop was one of the first of the daytime programs to find a sponsor. Starting in November 1948 Martin Fabrics began advertising during the Wednesday slot of the series, and offered a booklet How to Sew Velvet to anyone who sent in 25 cents. The company received over 300 requests for the booklet, which was considered remarkable for the start of daytime programing. In March 1949 it was reported that The Needle Shop would soon be sponsored by Steam-O-Matic, a maker of clothes irons.

== Broadcast history ==
The series of home-sewing lessons was hosted by Alice Burrows, who was sixty-two years-old when she started appearing on the program. In a news article published across the country Burrows was described as being "pretty, silvery-haired and bristling with energy".

Burrows stated she applied for the job as a teacher on television, and was hired on the spot to do a daily 15-minute sewing show. She received fan mail from across the United States, much of it from men who asked her to influence their wives to do more mending and darning. Because of her high volume of mail from husbands she did special programs showing men how to sew on buttons and let out trouser waist bands to make room for "middle-age spread." She received a good response to her shows aimed at men.

== Daytime time slot ==
According to the book What Women Watched: Daytime Television in the 1950s the DuMont daytime schedule beginning in January 1949 was:

- 10-10:30am Johnny Olson's Rumpus Room
- 10:30-11am Welcome, Neighbors
- 11am-12noon The Stan Shaw Show
- 12noon-12:15pm Amanda
- 12:15-12:30pm Man in the Street
- 12:30-12:45pm Camera Headlines
- 12:45-1pm Fashions in Song
- 1-1:30pm Okay, Mother
- 2:30-3pm Inside Photoplay (The Wendy Barrie Show)
- 3-3:15pm The Needle Shop
- 3:15-3:30pm Vincent Lopez Speaking (The Vincent Lopez Show)

However, the daytime lineup changed frequently. Newspaper television listings show The Needle Shop broadcast from 2:30-2:45 in October 1948, from 1:30-1:45 in April 1949, and 1:45-2:00 in December 1949.

== Preservation status ==
There are no known preserved episodes of The Needle Shop.

== Reception ==
Billboard magazine felt a younger and more attractive host would have been a better choice, but also stated that Burrows "obviously knows her stuff" and that the series "might prove of value".

== See also ==
- List of programs broadcast by the DuMont Television Network
- List of surviving DuMont Television Network broadcasts
- 1948-1949 United States network television schedule (weekday)
- Amanda - Also part of the 1948 WABD morning line-up
