= Alison Steele =

American DJ

- A promotional shot of Steele at WNEW c.1977
- Born: Ceil Loman; January 26, 1937; Brooklyn, New York
- Died: September 27, 1995 (aged 58); Manhattan, New York City
- Spouse: Ted Steele
- Children: Heather Steele (changed to Alizah Solomon)
- Presenting career
- Stations: WNEW; WXRK
- Style: Disc jockey

Alison Steele (born Ceil Loman; January 26, 1937 – September 27, 1995) was an American radio personality who was also known by her air name, The Nightbird. She amassed a large and loyal following on her night shifts on WNEW-FM in New York City during the late 1960s and 1970s. Her show featured progressive rock and artists associated with the counterculture of the 1960s, combined with listeners' calls and Steele's own unique brand of mellow DJ patter, peppered with poetry and mysticism. Her original Nightbird show ran from 1968 to 1979.

Steele also worked in television for many years in a variety of roles including performer, writer, and producer. She returned to WNEW in 1982 for another three years, and then joined New York's WXRK in 1989 for another six. Steele was honored with the Billboard award for FM Personality of the Year (1976), and she was the first woman to receive it. Years later, the same magazine established a new award in her honor, The Alison Steele Award for Lifetime Achievement.

== Early life ==
Steele was born Ceil Loman on January 26, 1937, in Brooklyn, New York. She had two sisters, Joyce and Emalie. She told an interviewer that her childhood had been comfortable until a sudden and drastic reversal of the family's fortunes. She credited the situation for creating a lifestyle of hard work and a lasting ambition for success. At 14, she landed a job running errands for a local television station, and opted not to go to college as she was "too impatient".

== Career ==
=== Early period ===
Steele developed her career by working for various New York City television and radio stations, eventually becoming a production assistant and associate producer. Along the way she worked for bandleader Ted Steele's television show, The Ted Steele Show, on WOR-TV, and by 1954 she was a regular cast member. At the age of 19, she married Steele and got her first taste of radio broadcasting with their husband and wife music show, Ted and the Redhead. The couple had one daughter, Heather, before the marriage ended in divorce.

=== WNEW-FM: 1966–1979 ===
In 1966, the popular music station WNEW-FM sought to distinguish itself from its competitors by establishing an all-female disc jockey lineup. Out of the 800 women who applied, Steele was one of the team of four who were hired. Steele worked the 2–7pm slot, Sunday through Friday. In doing so, she became one of the first female disc jockeys in the country. When WNEW abandoned the all-female pop music format after an 18-month trial to the increasingly popular progressive rock format, Steele was the only host who was asked to stay at the station.

On January 1, 1968, WNEW placed Steele in the overnight "graveyard shift" which granted her more creative freedom, leading her to develop her on-air personality and rapport with her listeners. "I thought there must be a lot of people ... that need something to relate to in the middle of the night, and if I could create some kind of camaraderie, a relationship between myself and the rest of the night people, then it would be more than just music". She thought of a new air name, based on gender ("bird" being slang for a girl) and her night owl hours of work, and chose The Nightbird.

Steele would begin her night show by reciting poetry over music, before introducing her show in her distinctive soft and sultry voice, aided by her preference of smoking small cigars. She often hosted with her dog, a French poodle named Genya. Her show always began with a bit of Andean flute music and some variation of her regular introduction:

The flutter of wings, the shadow across the moon, the sounds of the night, as the Nightbird spreads her wings and soars, above the earth, into another level of comprehension, where we exist only to feel. Come, fly with me, Alison Steele, the Nightbird, at WNEW-FM, until dawn.

She then transitioned to recordings of some of the more exceptional and experimental music being recorded at the time, as well as featuring the best of the familiar favorites of her audience. As well as music, she recited texts and poetry over music. She favored mystical and romantic writing for her recitations, and sometimes offered up her own writing as well. Whether poetry or prose, her spoken segments were almost always gently optimistic: "I abhor negativism," she stated. "I want to convey a positive attitude so that people will reach out to other people." She would end her show with the Beatles' instrumental song "Flying", over which she would say her goodbye message: "Hello night bird. How was your day? Did you visit the gods in the valleys far away? What did you bring me, in your visit from the sea?"

By 1971, Steele had acquired approximately 78,000 nightly listeners, the majority being men between 18 and 34.

She was a supporter and promoter of prog-rock bands like Yes, Genesis, Renaissance and the Moody Blues, as well as hippie favorites like Santana and the Grateful Dead. Her show was a major success for its timeslot, and when DJ John Zacherle left for another job in June 1971, WNEW sought to maximize her exposure by placing her in his 10pm to 2am shift, six nights a week. By 1974, she had more than 100,000 listeners at any given average quarter hour of her show, and hosted a syndicated rock radio show to 600 stations nationwide, a radio show for women, and a cable television talk show. According to Jimi Hendrix's manager Michael Jeffery, the song "Night Bird Flying", recorded by Hendrix and released posthumously on the album The Cry of Love (1971), was inspired by Steele's show. Steele became known as "The Grande Dame of New York Night".

Steele was on the credit committee of the American Federation of Television and Radio Artists.

At one point, she served as the station's music director. She was a member of the Rock and Roll Hall of Fame. In 1976, Steele became the first woman to receive a Billboard award for FM Personality of the Year, and the magazine also named an award in her honour, The Alison Steele Award for Lifetime Achievement, which was first awarded to Casey Kasem in 1997.

=== Television and writing work: 1979–1984 ===
After her departure from WNEW, Steele focused her career around television and writing. From 1982 to 1984, she was the announcer for the daytime soap opera Search for Tomorrow, and was the producer, writer, and correspondent for Limelight on CNN.

=== Return to WNEW and WXRK: 1984–1995 ===
In 1984, Steele returned to radio on WNEW–AM which lasted until 1986. For a number of years, Steele was also the disc jockey for the pop/rock in-flight audio entertainment channel on board Trans World Airlines.

Steele's final radio job was working overnights at WXRK from 1989 to 1995. In this position she returned to her original overnight hours, 2 to 6am. During these years, she also did some work for VH1, as well as running the cat boutique Just Cats with her sister in Manhattan.

Steele did a substantial amount of voice-over work for radio and television commercials, and she provided the narration for one of Howard Stern's popular radio bits, "Larry Fine at Woodstock", featuring impressionist Billy West.

== Personal life ==
Steele did frequent charity work and was a member of the board of the New York City chapter of the Epilepsy Foundation. She also helped raise funds for cerebral palsy and muscular dystrophy charities, as well as the Humane Society. She was a member of the Science of Mind religion.

Alison had a daughter, Heather, who attended a private school in upstate New York in the 1970s.

== Death and legacy ==
In June 1995, Steele was forced to leave WXRK due to illness from stomach cancer. She died on September 27, 1995, at Lenox Hill Hospital in Manhattan, aged 58. She is interred at Mount Hope Cemetery in Hastings-on-Hudson.

Steele was long recognized as a primary force in making overnight radio a notable medium, as well as developing the progressive rock radio format. She also was a female pioneer in a field traditionally dominated by men. Fellow New York disc jockey Jo Maeder said of Steele: "She was the one who really blazed a trail for all women in radio."
