= Chen Yifei =

Chinese artist (1946–2005)

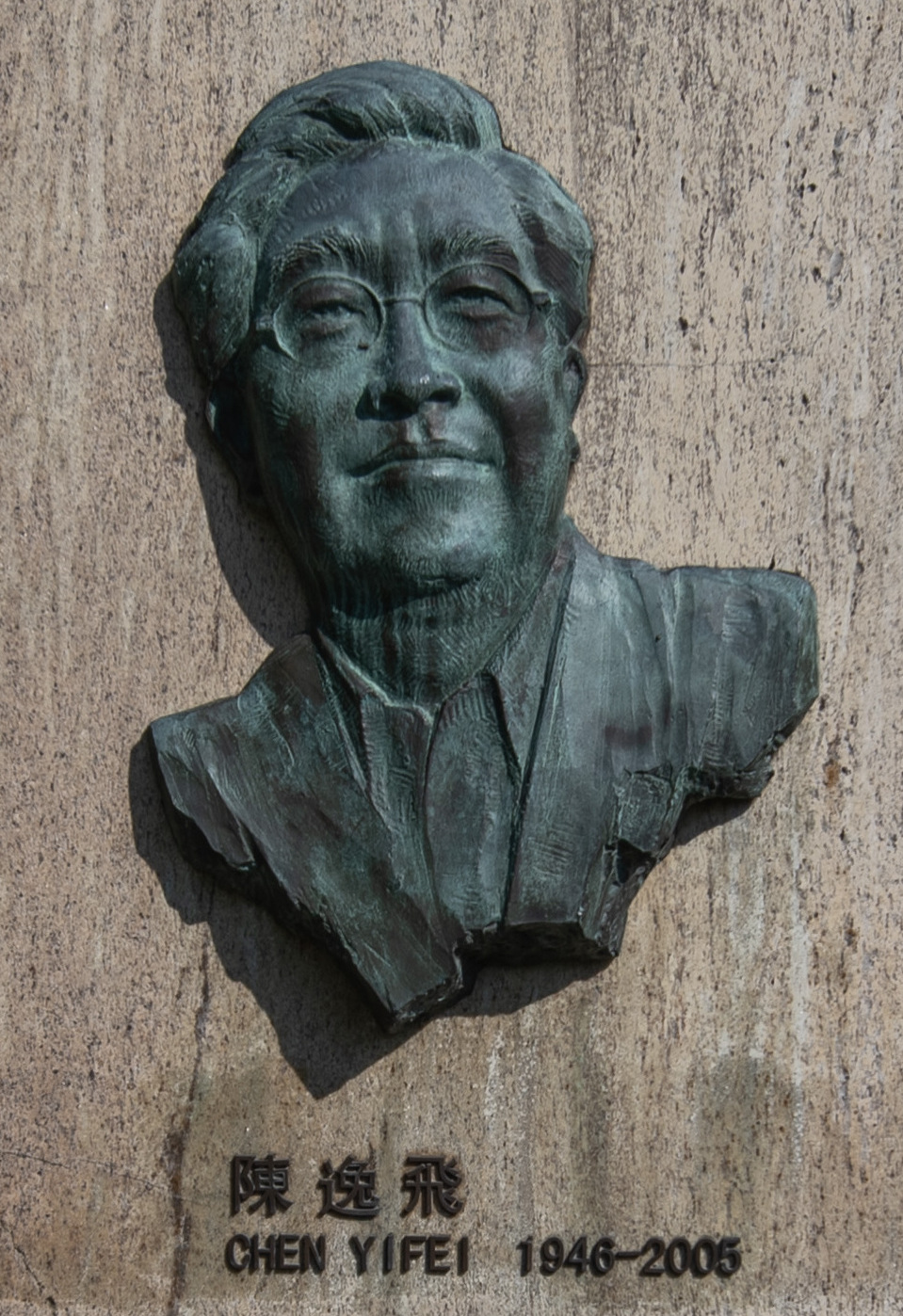
A relief of Chen Yifei at his grave

Chen Yifei (Chinese: 陈逸飞; April 12, 1946 – April 10, 2005) was a renowned Chinese classic-style painter, art director and film director. He has made many films such as The Music Box and Inyak Twilight.

== Achievements ==
Chen Yifei is a central figure in the development of Chinese oil painting. He is also considered one of China's most renowned contemporary artists. Although denounced for "capitalist behaviour", Chen's work with oil painting earned him recognition from Chinese authorities.

Chen soon became one of the leading painters of the Cultural Revolution. He was famous for his portraits of Mao Zedong and depiction of historic events of the modern Chinese nation. Since the Cultural Revolution, Chen became the forerunner of a new age in Chinese art, promoting a new sense of modernity and lifestyle in his paintings, including fashion, cinema and design. In his oil paintings, Chen abandoned his uncritical glorification of the party to blend realistic technique and romanticism with Chinese subject matter, especially melancholic and lonely women in traditional dresses. His characteristic "Romantic Realism" paintings use dark and dense colours and convey a sense of richness and integrity.

In 1980, he became one of the first artists from the People's Republic of China permitted to study art in the United States. Wally Findlay Galleries was the first gallery to grant Chen Yifei an exclusive contract. Chen Yifei enrolled at Hunter College and later found work as an art restorer. In 1983, before he attained his master's degree at Hunter, his solo exhibition at the Hammer Galleries was a great success. Later, he established himself as a contract artist for the gallery.

Chen returned to China and settled in Shanghai in 1990. He painted Impressionist landscapes of Tibet and his native Zhejiang Province. At the same time, he had also transformed himself into a style entrepreneur, creating fashion brands, decorating hotels and selling high-end clothing and chic home furnishings. He also supervised one of the country's biggest modelling agencies. Some critics said he turned increasingly commercial. In 2005, while working on a feature film Barber, Chen fell ill and died.

== Biography ==
=== Early life ===
Chen was born in Ningbo of the coastal province of Zhejiang. Later, the Chen family moved to Shanghai and Chen began his studies of Russian artists and Socialist Realism.

=== Early career ===
Chen graduated from the High School for Art in Shanghai in 1964, then graduated from the Shanghai Training School of Art (also called the Shanghai College of Art) in 1965 and soon after began focusing almost exclusively on oil painting. Within a year, as the Cultural Revolution gained steam, Chen caught the attention of Communist officials for his propaganda works that frequently glorified soldiers of the Communist party and portrayed grand images of Mao Zedong. Chen was soon viewed as "one of the leading artists at the state-financed Shanghai Institute of Painting." As the Cultural Revolution ended in 1976, Chen continued making oil paintings, now shifting his focus to a more romantic and European style. Chen was considered "one of the first artists to bridge the gap between the art of the Cultural Revolution and Western contemporary art".

In the 1970s, his profile rose due to his oil works. Chen began to attract the attention of Western buyers, including Armand Hammer (Chairman of the Occidental Petroleum Corporation in the United States), who purchased Chen's Hometown Recall as a gift for Deng Xiaoping.

In 1980 Chen left his position as head of the Oil Painting Department of the Shanghai Painting Academy in China to explore the art scene of New York, being one of the first artists of the People's Republic of China allowed out of the state to study art in the USA. Chen often told interviewers that he arrived in New York "with only $38 in his pocket" but still managed to catch the attention of gallery owners early after arrival. Although he was successful as an artist in China, he ventured to the United States, not to necessarily make his print on the art establishment, but to explore his predilections of artistic style. The New York art scene offered him the freedom to experiment and to settle with a form that he could be comfortable using. Chen expressed "elat[ion] by the freedom to look at art" and explore his boundaries. He gained entrance at Hunter College in the US after he arrived and worked as an art restorer. By 1983, before graduating from Hunter College, Chen's solo exhibitions at the Hammer Galleries had promoted his fame to where he later signed a contract to paint for Hammer Galleries. Chen then graduated from Hunter College in 1984 with a Master's in Art.

=== Career ===
In 1990, Chen returned to China, settling in Shanghai. Critics of Chen's work say that this period marked when Chen became a more commercial artist. The early 1990s denoted a point when Chen's art sold for record-breaking prices in big-name galleries. In the early 1990s, Chen also began building his name as a businessman, investing in a magazine called the "Shanghai Tatler," his Layefe fashion brands and later home design brands, and a restaurant in Xintiandi. Chen also began his film production career in 1993.

In 1994, Chen started his long-standing friendship and partnership with Gilbert Lloyd of the Marlborough Fine Art gallery who acted as his art dealer until his death.

In the last part of Chen's life, he devoted his time increasingly to acting as a "style entrepreneur" working as a modeling agent, fashion designer and decorator as well as focusing on his film productions.

== Art ==
=== Style and content ===
Chen worked primarily in oil painting which portrayed his sense of romanticism and realism combined. His works frequently featured beautiful women in traditional Chinese attire working with musical instruments or other romanticized objects. There are many examples of this brand of paint including Young Cellists (1984) and Two Women and Fan (2003). Other works featuring Chinese women in traditional clothing include Beauty (Blue/Red) (1998), Beauty with Fan (2002), Group of Beauties with Fans (2004), Seated Beauty with Fan (1998), and Reclining Beauty (1997) The realism of Chen's works often evokes a photographic or cinematic feeling, inspired by the framing, lighting and positioning of the paintings.

In addition to painting the female form, some of Chen's earlier works were often more impressionistic landscape paintings done in his style, such as his piece Shadow from 1983 in which a scene of a canal in absence of human life is painted in muted tones. Chen first received inspiration for these works when he travelled to Europe in the summer of 1982 and toured the canals, noting similarities in the ambiance between the East and West. He later returned to Zhejiang and studied, what he considered, the "Venice of the East" for more inspiration. His landscapes often featured similar scenes of canals inspired by the canals of Venice, Italy as well as the canals of his hometown in Zhejiang province.

=== "Official" art ===
Chen's artistic career began soon after graduating from the Shanghai College of Art when his realistic style of oil painting caught the attention of Communist officials. Chen painted many famous portraits of Mao in heroic, glorified positions. One of these works, Seizing of the Presidential Palace (1977) received great favor in the Communist party, earning a place in the great halls around China. The picture is a historical epic depiction of a group of soldiers raising a red flag, representative of the history of the Revolution. His work Eulogy of the Yellow River, completed in 1972, is still considered one of his most commercially successful works, featuring his singular techniques in expressive brushstrokes that create a realistic view of a soldier standing above a yellow-toned valley, turned to face the viewer. The work was originally inspired by a poem (written by Guang Weiran) and a song (composed by Xian Xinghai). The work was first presented to the public in 1977 at the United Armies Art Exhibition when Chen was 25 years old. The revelation of this work marked a pivotal point in Chen's artistic career, propelling his art into further success in the future. In 2007, two years after the artist's death, Eulogy of the Yellow River sold at The China Guardian 2007 Spring Auction of Oil Painting and Sculptures for a record high of RMB 40.28 million, breaking both Chen's previous world record high sale and the national record for Chinese oil paintings.

In 1979, Chen painted Looking at History from My Space, a piece that critics consider Chen's work considers "one of his most original works". The painting features the artist standing in front of a large mural of painted events from the 1910s and 1920s, symbolically representing the artist trying to distance himself from history, to examine his place in history.

=== Realism ===
Along with his predilection for painting women, Chen painted a series of realistic works featuring people of Tibet; the series was called "Tibet." To gather intelligence and insight into the people and customs of Tibet, Chen spent some time in the 1980s exploring Jiangnan. The works that followed his excursion held to his highly realistic brand of paint, but traveled away from only painting the most beautiful forms of life. His "Tibet" works feature the tanned and coarse Tibetan people with no pretense of activity and muted expressions. One of the most famous works from this series was called Upland Wind (sometimes called Wind of Mountain Village) and was painted in 1994. The painting features a family of Tibetan travelers, heavily clothed and layered (to convey a sense of coldness) in traditional Tibetan styles. The painting was initially auctioned at the China Guardian 1994 Autumn Auctions, selling for a record-high price of 2.86 million Yuan. At the time, this was a record for Chinese oil paintings. In May 2011 the painting was auctioned off for 81.65 million Yuan, beating the record again for highest-selling oil painting as well as beating his record for highest-selling work.

=== Acclaim and criticism ===
His works are considered a unique combination of both Western and Eastern influences. Chen's style combines the realism associated with European art styles, with Eastern subject matter and themes close to the artist's history. One such example of this unique blend is his painting Poppy which derives its content from a Tang dynasty song about a woman who solemnly questions her fate. The painting features a Chinese woman in traditional Chinese garb, yet the style of painting coupled with her posture is more reminiscent of ancient Greek artworks than Tang dynasty works. His Eastern-Western fusion of artistic styles is apparent in another of his famous paintings called Soiree, which depicts Chinese musicians in traditional apparel, symbolizing an Eastern theme, but the atmosphere of the painting aligns more with the Western ideal of "carpe diem".

Critics of Chen's work comment that his works lack an edge possibly due to his commercialization. Chen, however, viewed his entrepreneurship and businessman-like approach to art as an extension of what he truly loved: beauty. In answering a question regarding his work, Chen is quoted to have said: "I love paintings, clothing and films because they are all beautiful things".

== Complete list of exhibitions ==
- 1980 Wally Findlay Galleries, New York, NY (solo)
- 1981 Wally Findlay Galleries, New York, NY (solo)
- 1982 Wally Findlay Galleries, New York, NY (solo)
- 1984 Hammer Galleries, New York, NY (solo)
- 1983 New England Center for Contemporary Art, USA (solo)
- 1988 Hammer Galleries, New York, NY (solo)
- 1990 Hammer Galleries, New York, NY (solo)
- 1990 Recent Paintings, Seibu Museum, Tokyo, Japan (solo)
- 1996-1997 The Homecoming of Chen Yifei, Shanghai Museum, Shanghai, China; The China National Museum of Fine Arts, Beijing, China (solo, retrospective)
- 1996-1997 First London Exhibition, Marlborough Fine Art, London, England (solo)
- 1997 Chen Yifei, Première Exposition en France, Musée Granet, Aix-en-Provence, France (solo)
- 1997 Paintings of Tibet, Pavilion of the People's Republic of China, XLVII Venice Biennale (solo)
- 1999 New Works, Marlborough Gallery, New York, NY (solo)
- 2001 Initial Image, Yibo Gallery, Shanghai, China
- 2001 Galerie Wimmer, Munich, Germany (solo)
- 2003 Oeuvres Récentes, Marlborough Monte-Carlo, Monaco (solo)
- 2005 Chen Yifei (1946–2005), Marlborough Galerie AG, Zurich, Switzerland (solo)
- 2005 Chen Yifei (1946–2005), Marlborough Fine Art, London, England (solo)
- 2006 Fiction@Love, MOCA Shanghai, Shanghai, China
- 2006 Summer Exhibition, Marlborough Fine Art, London, England

== Film ==
In 1993 Chen entered the film production industry with an autobiographical film named Old Dream at Sea: Personal Recollections on Chen Yifei. Chen delved further into his career in film production in 1995 with his first feature titled A Date at Dusk (also known as Ren Yue Huang Hun) which was featured at the Cannes Film Festival. The film was about the 1930s in Shanghai.

In 2002 Chen began preparations for his film Barber (also known as The Music Box). The production of the film halted in 2003 when Chen reported having issues with one of the leading actors, Jiang Wen. The film began production in February 2003 when Chen Kun was brought in to replace Jiang Wen as a leading actor. Filming for Barber was still in progress when Chen became ill and died of a gastric haemorrhage in April 2005. There have been recurring plans to finish the film.

== Fashion and home design ==
Chen launched his fashion brand, Layefe (a play on his first name), in 1998, followed by the introduction of Layefe Home, his designer homeware line, in 2000.

Chen initially created the fashion line to offer affordable clothing in his home country. After spending time abroad and gaining a broader perspective on fashion, he developed a collection that reflected a fusion of Western and Eastern influences. Through Layefe, he sought to "provide beautiful and affordable clothing for Chinese women."

== Social life ==
Chen Yifei had an active social life, living life as a sort of celebrity in Shanghai due to his successes in art, fashion and business. He often appeared in local tabloids if not for his accomplishments as an artist and businessman, then for gossip about his alleged "affairs with models".

Chen has two sons; one, Chen Lin, from his first marriage and another from his second marriage. Chen's second son from his second marriage, Chen Tian, was to a former model named Song Meiying.

Chen was one of the celebrities who gave out his cellular phone number to reporters.
