= Johnny Olson's Rumpus Room =

American TV variety series (1949–1952)

- Presented by: Johnny Olson
- Country of origin: United States

Production
- Running time: 60 mins.

Original release
- Network: DuMont
- Release: January 17, 1949 – July 4, 1952

Johnny Olson's Rumpus Room is an American television variety show hosted by Johnny Olson. It was broadcast from January 17, 1949, to July 4, 1952, on the DuMont Television Network.

== Broadcast history ==
The show aired at 10 a.m. Eastern Time.

The show was one of the first daytime television shows broadcast from New York City to DuMont's small network of East Coast cities. Olson also hosted the DuMont talent show Doorway to Fame (May 1947 – July 1949), and DuMont's Saturday-morning children's show Kids and Company (September 1951 – June 1952).

According to the book What Women Watched: Daytime Television in the 1950s (University of Texas Press, 2005) by Marsha Cassidy, the DuMont daytime schedule beginning in January 1949 was:

- 10-10:30 am Johnny Olson's Rumpus Room
- 10:30-11 am Welcome, Neighbors
- 11 am-12 noon The Stan Shaw Show
- 12 noon-12:15 pm Amanda
- 12:15-12:30 pm Man in the Street
- 12:30-12:45 pm Camera Headlines
- 12:45-1 pm Fashions in Song
- 1-1:30 pm Okay, Mother
- 2:30-3 pm Inside Photoplay (The Wendy Barrie Show)
- 3-3:15 pm The Needle Shop
- 3:15-3:30 pm Vincent Lopez Speaking (The Vincent Lopez Show)

== Olson's career ==
In the 1940s, Olson hosted a popular radio show also titled Johnny Olson's Rumpus Room at WTMJ in Milwaukee. Sometime after 1943, Johnny moved the show (WTMJ continued to air Rumpus Room with a new host) to WMAQ in Chicago as an evening variety show running 10:30 pm to 12 midnight (CT). Olson went on to become a famous announcer on American game shows, including as the announcer on The Price Is Right on CBS Television and first-run syndication from 1972 until his death (the nighttime version of The Price Is Right reunited Olson with another prominent DuMont personality, Dennis James, for its first five years on air).

== See also ==
- List of programs broadcast by the DuMont Television Network
- List of surviving DuMont Television Network broadcasts
- 1949–50 United States network television schedule (weekday)
