= Vincent Lopez =

American bandleader, actor, and pianist (1895–1975)

Vincent López
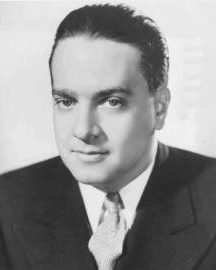
- Lopez in a 1942 advertisement

Background information
- Born: December 30, 1895; Brooklyn, New York City
- Died: September 20, 1975 (aged 79) North Miami, Florida, US
- Genre: Jazz
- Occupation: Bandleader
- Instrument: Piano
- Formerly of: Jimmy Dorsey; Tommy Dorsey; Gloria Parker

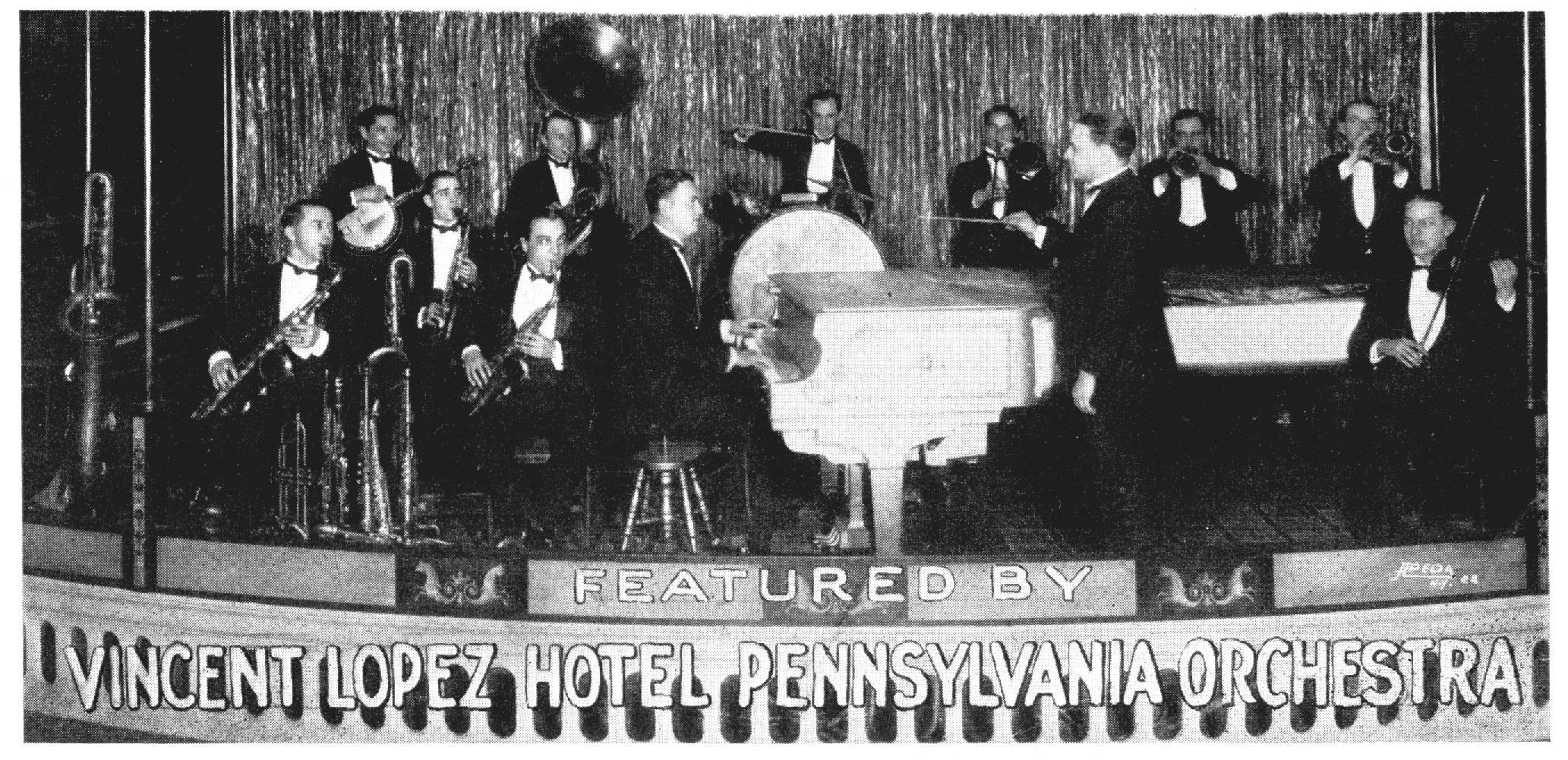
Vincent Lopez and his band in the early 1920s

Vincent Lopez (December 30, 1895 – September 20, 1975) was an American bandleader, actor, and pianist.

== Early life and education ==
Lopez was born of Portuguese immigrant parents in Brooklyn, New York City, United States, and was leading his own dance band in New York City by 1916. On November 27, 1921, his band began broadcasting on the new medium of entertainment radio; the band's weekly 90-minute show on the Newark, New Jersey, station WJZ boosted the popularity of both himself and of radio. He became one of North America's most popular bandleaders, and would retain that status through the 1940s.

== Career ==
"Afghanistan" (1920)
Lopez and his band playing "Afghanistan" in 1920

"I'm Just Wild About Harry" (1922)
Lopez and his playing "I'm Just Wild About Harry" in 1922

He began his radio programs by announcing "Hello everybody, Lopez speaking!" His theme song was "Nola", Felix Arndt's novelty ragtime piece of 1915, and Lopez became so identified with it that he occasionally satirized it. (His 1939 movie short for Vitaphone, Vincent Lopez and his Orchestra, features the entire band singing "Down with Nola".)

Lopez worked occasionally in feature films, notably The Big Broadcast (1932) and as a live-action feature in the Max Fleischer cartoon I Don't Want to Make History (1936). In 1940, he was one of the first bandleaders to work in Soundies movie musicals. He made additional Soundies in 1944.

Noted musicians who played in his band included Artie Shaw, Xavier Cugat, Jimmy Dorsey, Tommy Dorsey, Bob Effros, Mike Mosiello, Fred Lowery, Joe Tarto and Glenn Miller. He also featured singers Keller Sisters and Lynch, Betty Hutton, and Marion Hutton. Lopez's longtime drummer was the irreverent Mike Riley, who popularized the novelty hit "The Music Goes Round and Round".

Lopez's flamboyant style of piano playing influenced such later musicians as Eddy Duchin and Liberace.

In 1941, Lopez's Orchestra began a residency at the Taft Hotel in Manhattan that would last 25 years.

In the early 1950s, Lopez along with Gloria Parker hosted a radio program broadcast from the Taft Hotel called Shake the Maracas in which audience members competed for small prizes by playing maracas with the orchestra.

In 1960 he published his autobiography Lopez Speaking. Vincent Lopez died at the Villa Maria nursing home in North Miami, Florida, on September 20, 1975.

== Business interests ==
Lopez saw jazz and bandleading as a big business opportunity. Like rival Paul Whiteman had done a few years earlier with his United Orchestras, Inc, in 1924 he created the company Vincent Lopez, Inc, with a stated goal of starting jazz orchestras and schools in major North American cities, and managing copyrights. By 1926 the endeavor became insolvent, and to avoid bankruptcy Lopez, Inc went into partnership with Eugene Geiger's Eldorado Finance Co.

In 1927, he partnered with other major bandleaders Paul Whiteman, Ben Bernie, George Olson, Roger Kahn, Fred Rich, B. A. Rolfe, and Ernie Golden to launch the trade union National Association of Orchestra Leaders. They hired Julian T. Abeles at an annual salary of $25,000; his stated goal was to stop competition among their orchestras for musicians, contracts, and bookings. In practice this was a labor cartel, and the NAOL's efforts and lawsuits on behalf of orchestra leaders and owners continued into the 21st century.

== Big band / swing-era music ==
- Early In The Morning, recorded by Vincent Lopez on Columbia Records, lyrics and music by Gloria Parker
- Here Comes That Mood, recorded by Vincent Lopez, music and lyrics by Gloria Parker
- In Santiago by the Sea, recorded by Vincent Lopez and his Orchestra, music and lyrics by Gloria Parker
- I Learned To Rumba', recorded by Vincent Lopez and his Orchestra, music and lyrics by Gloria Parker
- My Dream Christmas, recorded by Vincent Lopez, lyrics and music by Gloria Parker
- Shake The Maracas, name of a radio program on WABC hosted by Vincent Lopez and Gloria Parker, lyrics and music by Gloria Parker
- When Our Country Was Born, recorded by Vincent Lopez, lyrics and music by Gloria Parker
- Song of the Flame in March 1926, on OKeh record 40586.
- Blue Skies, Recorded by Vincent Lopez in 1927
- Since I found you, Recorded by Vincent Lopez in 1927

== See also ==
- The Vincent Lopez Show (1949-1957 TV show)
- Dinner Date (1950 TV show broadcast from the Hotel Taft)
