= Russ Hodges =

American sportscaster (1910–1971)

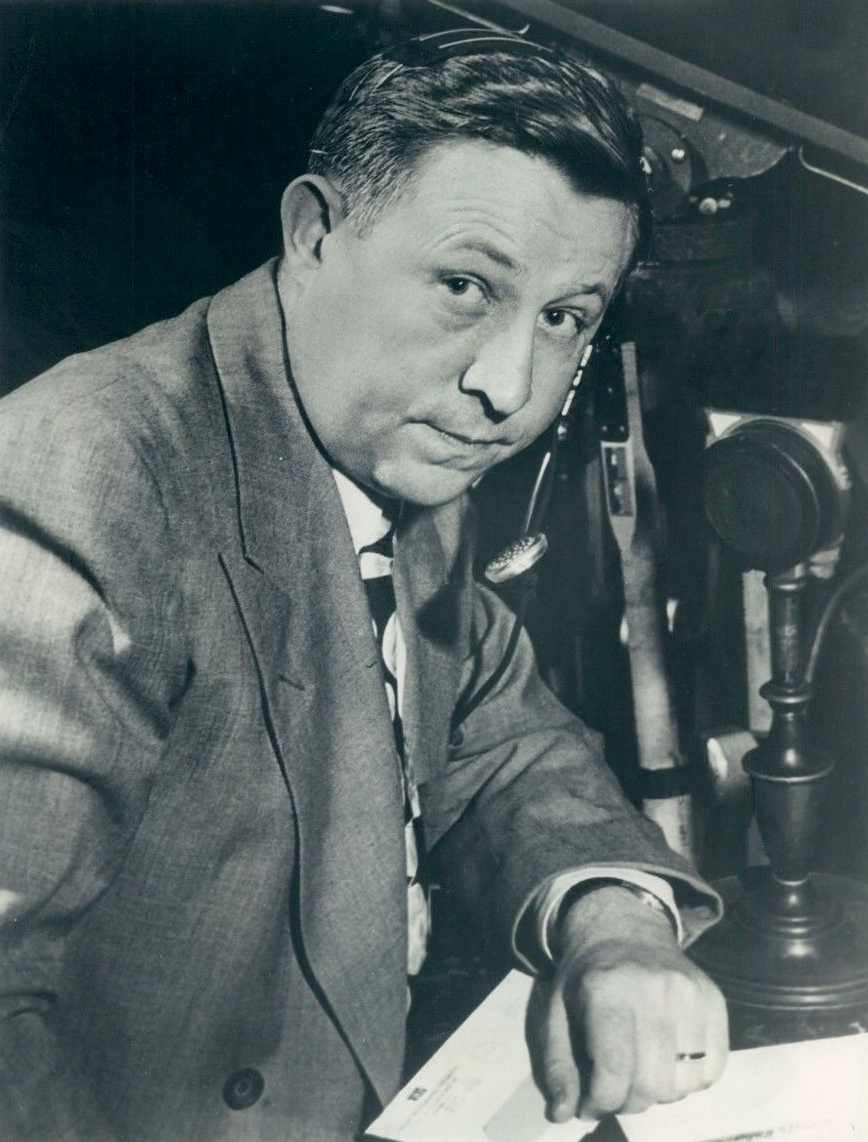
- Hodges in 1955
- Born: June 18, 1910; Dayton, Tennessee, U.S.
- Died: April 19, 1971 (aged 60); Mill Valley, California, U.S.
- Education: University of Kentucky
- Occupation: Sports announcer
- Years active: 1934–1970
- Known for: Major League Baseball coverage The Giants won the pennant!
- Children: 2
- Awards: Ford C. Frick Award (1980)

Russell Pleasant Hodges (June 18, 1910 – April 19, 1971) was an American sportscaster who did play-by-play for several baseball teams, most notably the New York Giants / San Francisco Giants. He is perhaps best remembered for his call of Bobby Thomson's "Shot Heard 'Round the World"—The Giants win the pennant! The Giants win the pennant!

== Early career ==
Born in Dayton, Tennessee, Hodges began his broadcasting career in 1934. He was sports editor of WBT, Charlotte, North Carolina until October 1941, when he moved full-time to WOL in Washington, D.C., where he had already been doing play-by-play for the Washington Redskins. He worked for the Chicago Cubs, Chicago White Sox, Washington Senators, and Cincinnati Reds before landing in New York City with the New York Yankees and New York Giants, who during much of the 1940s only broadcast home games and shared the same radio team — lead announcer Mel Allen and No. 2 man Hodges.

From April 14, 1948, to April 22, 1949, Hodges hosted the 15-minute DuMont series Scoreboard, also known as Russ Hodges' Scoreboard. In 1949, Hodges became a No. 1 announcer when the Giants and the Yankees separated their radio networks to each broadcast a full, 154-game schedule. He was the voice of the Giants for the next 22 seasons on both coasts.

== 1951 Bobby Thomson home run call ==
On October 3, 1951, Hodges was on the microphone for Bobby Thomson's "Shot Heard 'Round the World". It was Hodges who cried, "The Giants win the pennant! The Giants win the pennant!"

This famous moment in sports broadcasting was nearly lost. This was in an era before all game broadcasts were recorded. However, in his autobiography, Hodges related how a Brooklyn fan, excited over what appeared to be a certain Dodger victory, hooked up his home tape recorder to his radio. The fan wanted to capture Hodges "crying." Instead, he recorded history; the next day, he called Hodges and said, "You have to have this tape." In reality the fan, Lawrence Goldberg, was a lifelong Giants fan. On the 50th anniversary of the game, Goldberg told The New York Times Richard Sandomir about his fateful decision: "I knew I wouldn't be able to listen to the broadcast and I knew something was going to happen. It was the third game of the playoffs. That kind of game had to be climactic."

Bobby Thomson... up there swingin'... He's had two out of three, a single and a double, and Billy Cox is playing him right on the third-base line... One out, last of the ninth... Branca pitches... Bobby Thomson takes a strike called on the inside corner... Bobby hitting at .292... He's had a single and a double and he drove in the Giants' first run with a long fly to center... Brooklyn leads it 4–2...Hartung down the line at third not taking any chances... Lockman with not too big of a lead at second, but he'll be runnin' like the wind if Thomson hits one... Branca throws... [audible sound of bat meeting ball]

There's a long drive... it's gonna be, I believe...THE GIANTS WIN THE PENNANT!! THE GIANTS WIN THE PENNANT! THE GIANTS WIN THE PENNANT! THE GIANTS WIN THE PENNANT! Bobby Thomson hits into the lower deck of the left-field stands! The Giants win the pennant and they're goin' crazy, they're goin' crazy! HEEEY-OH!!! [ten-second pause for crowd noise]

I don't believe it! I don't believe it! I do not believe it! Bobby Thomson... hit a line drive... into the lower deck... of the left-field stands... and the whole place is goin' crazy! The Giants! Horace Stoneham has got a winner! The Giants won it... by a score of 5 to 4... and they're pickin' Bobby Thomson up... and carryin' him off the field!

In the years that have followed, Hodges "The Giants win the pennant! The Giants win the pennant!" has been echoed in other sports. Commentators have echoed it when announcing their team's championship victories. Examples include Stanley Cup wins by the Philadelphia Flyers in 1974 and the Chicago Blackhawks in 2010.

On October 16, 2014, the eventual World Series champion Giants won the National League pennant on a three-run walk-off homer by Travis Ishikawa, and Fox broadcaster Joe Buck quoted the line as the ball landed in the right-field stands. However, Giants radio broadcaster Jon Miller on KNBR radio yelled, "Good-bye, a home run for the game and for the pennant! The Giants have won the pennant!...Travis Ishikawa with the Bobby Thomson moment."

This historic call is also preserved at the Hall of Fame, in the form of the original score sheet Hodges was personally logging. Under Thomson's name in the ninth inning slot, there begins a long streak across the entire score sheet where Hodges, pencil to the paper awaiting the outcome of the at-bat, jumped up in excitement, and his pencil-holding hand streaked across his score sheet, unintentionally capturing the moment.

In the film The Godfather, Sonny Corleone is listening to this broadcast on his car radio when he is murdered at a toll booth. The broadcast is also used in an episode of M*A*S*H and has been fictionalised in the first chapter of Don DeLillo's epic magnum opus novel, Underworld, (published separately as a novella under the title Pafko at the Wall.)

In the film Parental Guidance, Artie Decker (Billy Crystal) plays the broadcast for his grandson Turner (Joshua Rush), as a way of boosting his self-esteem due to his speech impediment. At the end of the film, Turner delivers the commentary at his sister's recital without a single stutter, receiving a standing ovation.

== Later career ==
When the Giants moved to San Francisco in 1958, Hodges followed the club west. He continued working for the team through 1970, when he retired. His signature home run call was, "Bye-Bye, Baby!", a phrase that was set to music as the Giants' theme song during the 1960s.

Hodges was also the lead announcer for Pabst Blue Ribbon Bouts on CBS from 1948 to 1955. The most famous fight called by Hodges was Sonny Liston vs. Cassius Clay, one of the most anticipated, watched, and controversial fights in boxing history. Some other fights Hodges called include Beau Jack vs. Ike Williams, Ezzard Charles vs. Joe Louis, Sugar Ray Robinson vs. Jake LaMotta, Floyd Patterson vs. Hurricane Jackson, and Joe Louis vs. Cesar Brion. Hodges, who had played halfback for the University of Kentucky before suffering a broken ankle in his sophomore year, also broadcast professional and college football at various times in his career, including several years in which he teamed with Giants partner Lon Simmons to call San Francisco 49ers radio broadcasts.

== Death and subsequent honors ==
Hodges died suddenly of a heart attack at age 60 in Mill Valley, California, on April 19, 1971. He was survived by his wife, Gay, and two children.

The National Sportscasters and Sportswriters Association inducted Hodges into its Hall of Fame in 1975. In 1980, became the fourth recipient of the Ford C. Frick Award for excellence in baseball broadcasting from the Baseball Hall of Fame. In 2000, the Giants named the broadcast booths in their new ballpark the Hodges-Simmons Broadcast Center in honor of Hodges and his former partner Lon Simmons. In 2008, Hodges was elected into the Bay Area Radio Hall of Fame, joining his longtime broadcast partner Simmons, who was inducted in 2006.
