= Deadline Dramas =

1940s American radio drama

- Genre: Drama
- Running time: 30 minutes
- Country of origin: United States
- Language(s): English
- Syndicates: NBC; Blue Network
- Starring: Bob White; Ireene Wicker
- Created by: Bob White
- Produced by: Charles Martin; Eddie Pola
- Original release: December 29, 1940 – September 24, 1944

Deadline Dramas is an American old-time radio drama. It was broadcast on NBC from December 29, 1940, to July 20, 1941, and on the Blue Network from December 26, 1943, to September 24, 1944.

== Format ==
Deadline Dramas' roots can be traced back to medieval days when a court jester would take plot suggestions offered by noblemen and improvise short plays. Bob White, who created Deadline Dramas, adapted the technique to radio. John Dunning described the technique as follows in On the Air: The Encyclopedia of Old-Time Radio:

Listeners submitted plot situations of no more than 20 words. White and his cast of two would retire to a soundproof control room where they had just two minutes to work out a fully developed plot. While they frantically picked at story threads, a sound man listened in via earphones, improvising his effects and devising cues for organist Rosa Rio. When the three players emerged, they delivered a polished seven-minute playlet, to the amazement of those listening at home.

Each episode of the show included three such playlets, with each submission that was used earning a $25 war bond for the person who sent it in. Some of the presentations "were praised by trade magazines." Others were panned, as exemplified by a 1944 episode about which Joe Koehler wrote in the trade magazine Billboard, "There's everything in Deadline Dramas but entertainment."

== Personnel ==
Bob White and Ireene Wicker appeared in both versions of the program. The 1940-1941 version also included William Fadiman. The 1943-1944 version also included Joan Banks and Elsie Gordon.

Rosa Rio was the organist. Producers were Eddie Pola and Charles Martin.
