= The Wendy Barrie Show =

1948 American television series

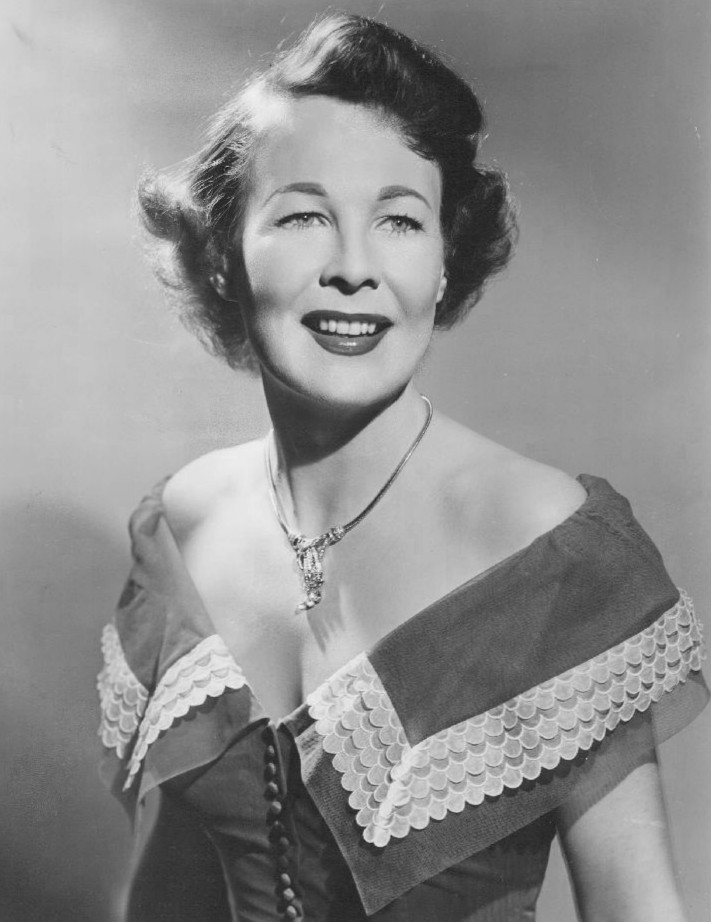
- Barrie in NBC publicity photo (1950) inscribed "Wendy Barrie, called Television's No. 1 interviewer, meets the great and near-great on her show, Tuesdays and Thursdays on NBC Television"
- Also known as: Inside Photoplay; Photoplay Time; Through Wendy's Window
- Genre: Talk show
- Presented by: Wendy Barrie
- Country of origin: United States
- Original language: English

Production
- Camera setup: Multi-camera
- Running time: 30 mins. (March 1949–February 1950); 15 mins. (February 1950–September 1950)

Original release
- Network: ABC
- Release: November 10, 1948 – September 1950
- Network: DuMont (January–July 1949)
- Release: January 17 – July 13, 1949
- Network: NBC
- Release: February 21 – September 27, 1950
- Network: WHIO-TV
- Release: January 11 – October 30, 1954

The Wendy Barrie Show (also known as Inside Photoplay, Photoplay Time, Through Wendy's Window, and Who's Who With Wendy Barrie) is an American talk show hosted by Wendy Barrie, which aired from November 10, 1948, to September 27, 1950.

== Broadcast history ==
The Wendy Barrie Show is notable as one of the first examples of a televised talk show. It aired separately on ABC, DuMont, and NBC, debuting on ABC on November 10, 1948 (Wednesday), at 8:30 pm ET as the sketch comedy Inside Photoplay before switching to Mondays in September–December 1949 as Photoplay Time, then becoming Through Wendy's Window in August–September 1950 The DuMont version aired from 2:30 to 3:00 pm ET from January 17, 1949 (Monday), to July 13, 1949 (Wednesday).

The NBC version debuted on February 21, 1950. It aired Tuesdays and Thursdays from 7:30 to 7:45 pm Eastern Time, with the final episode airing on September 27, 1950. Martin Goodman was the producer, and Alan Neuman was the director.

The series stars Wendy Barrie, a film and television actress with over 40 films to her credit.

According to the book What Women Watched: Daytime Television in the 1950s (University of Texas Press, 2005) by Marsha Cassidy, the DuMont daytime schedule beginning in January 1949 was:

- 10–10:30 am Johnny Olson's Rumpus Room
- 10:30–11 am Welcome, Neighbors
- 11 am–12noon The Stan Shaw Show
- 12noon–12:15 pm Amanda
- 12:15–12:30 pm Man in the Street
- 12:30–12:45 pm Camera Headlines
- 12:45–1 pm Fashions in Song
- 1–1:30 pm Okay, Mother
- 2:30–3 pm Inside Photoplay (The Wendy Barrie Show)
- 3–3:15 pm The Needle Shop
- 3:15–3:30 pm Vincent Lopez Speaking (The Vincent Lopez Show)

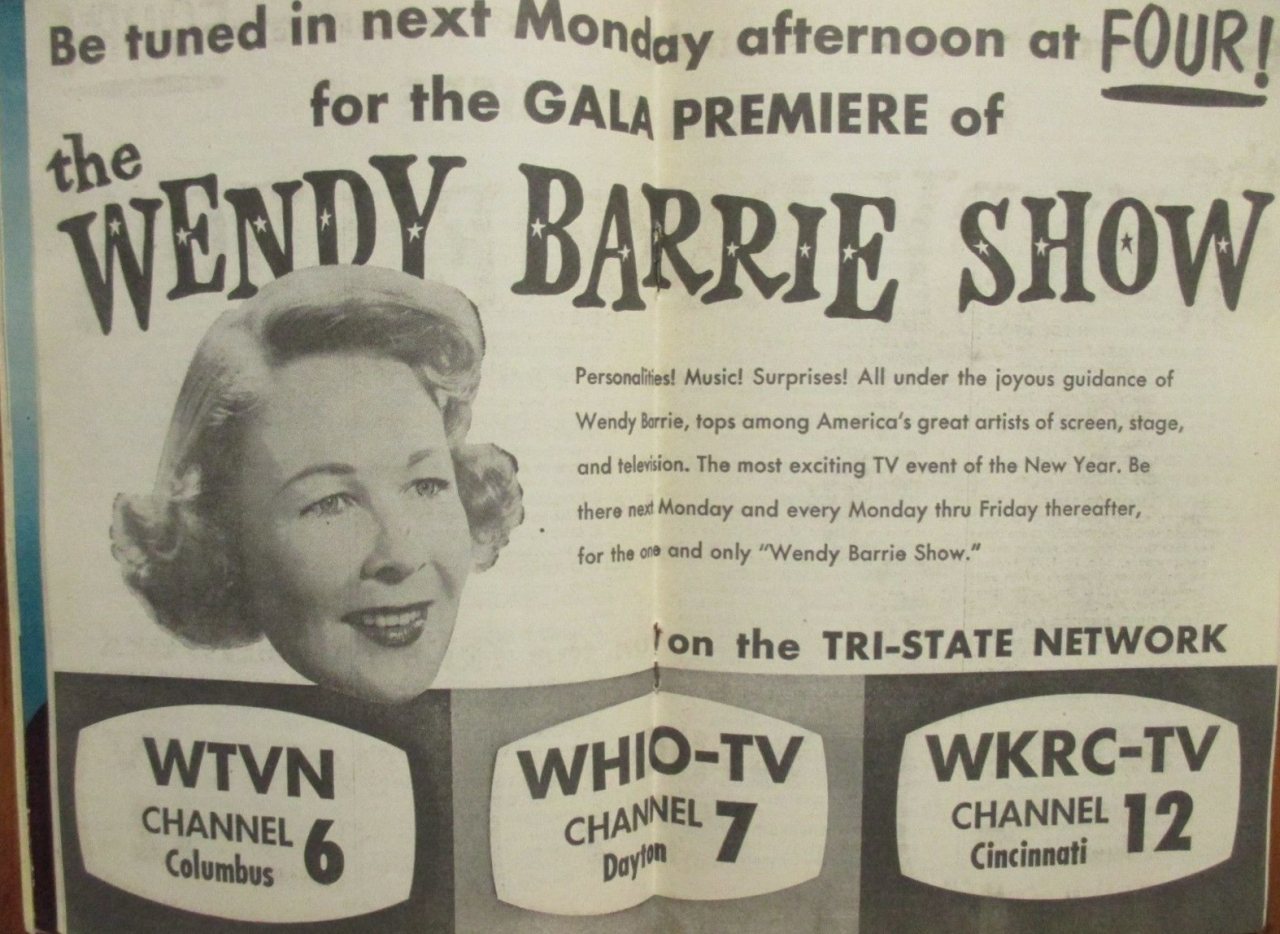
Advertisement for the Premier of The Wendy Barrie Show originating from WHIO-TV in Dayton and simulcast on WKRC-TV in Cincinnati and WTVN-TV (now WSYX) in Columbus, all in Ohio

=== Tri-State Network ===
In 1953, three television stations owned by Taft Broadcasting Company and Cox Communications formed the short-lived "Tri-State Network" to compete with entertainment programming produced by Crosley Broadcasting Corporation on Crosley television stations in the Cincinnati, Columbus, and Dayton, Ohio, broadcast markets. On January 11, 1954, a new The Wendy Barrie Show premiered from the studios of WHIO-TV in Dayton, simulcast on Taft Broadcasting's WKRC-TV in Cincinnati and WTVN-TV (now WSYX) in Columbus. Wendy Barrie's contract was terminated in October 1954.

== Episode status ==
A DuMont episode survives on YouTube under the title The Wendy Barrie Show, and featuring guest Jack Shaindlin.

One DuMont episode from June 1949, under the title Who's Who With Wendy Barrie, is held in the J. Fred MacDonald collection at the Library of Congress.

An episode from the ABC run, dated October 17, 1949, and titled Photoplay Time, is in the collection of the UCLA Film and Television Archive.

== See also ==
- The Adventures of Oky Doky (1948–1949 on DuMont)
- Picture This (1948–1949 on NBC)
- List of programs broadcast by the DuMont Television Network
- List of surviving DuMont Television Network broadcasts
- 1949–50 United States network television schedule

== Bibliography ==
- David Weinstein, The Forgotten Network: DuMont and the Birth of American Television (Philadelphia: Temple University Press, 2004) ISBN 1-59213-245-6
- Alex McNeil, Total Television, Fourth edition (New York: Penguin Books, 1980) ISBN 0-14-024916-8
- Tim Brooks and Earle Marsh, The Complete Directory to Prime Time Network TV Shows, Third edition (New York: Ballantine Books, 1964) ISBN 0-345-31864-1
