= Dinner Date (American TV series) =

US television program

- Also known as: Dinner Date with Vincent Lopez
- Genre: Variety show
- Presented by: Vincent Lopez (conductor); Lee Russell; Ann Warren
- Country of origin: United States
- No. of episodes: 28

Production
- Running time: 30 minutes

Original release
- Network: DuMont
- Release: January 28 – July 29, 1950

Dinner Date, also known as Dinner Date with Vincent Lopez, is a musical variety show that was broadcast on the DuMont Television Network on Saturdays from 8 to 8:30 pm ET from January 28, 1950, to July 22, 1950, or July 29, 1950.

The show, "a relaxed program of music and song", hosted by bandleader Vincent Lopez, was broadcast from the Grill Room at the Hotel Taft in New York City, where Lopez and his orchestra performed from 1942 to 1962. Besides Lopez's longtime vocalists Lee Russell and Ann Warren, the show featured guest stars such as Cab Calloway, Arthur Tracy, and Woody Herman.

Episodes often featured content related to letters sent in by viewers or to names of some of the viewers. The shows were unscripted, but Lopez planned "to the second" what he, the orchestra, and other performers would do. Unlike some contemporary variety programs, performers appeared only once in each episode.

Warren Russell and George Putnam were the announcers.

Dinner Date's competition included Saturday Night Revue, TV Teen Club, and Ken Murray's show.

== Critical reception ==
A review in the trade publication Variety said the program "looks like one of the first successful entertainment programs to be aired from a remote location." It commended Warren and Russell for their singing and director Harry Coyle for his handling of the "usual difficult conditions imposed by working outside a TV studio."

== Episode status ==
None of the episodes are known to survive.

== See also ==
- List of programs broadcast by the DuMont Television Network
- List of surviving DuMont Television Network broadcasts
- The Vincent Lopez Show (1949–1950, 1957), a TV series also hosted by Lopez

== Bibliography ==
- David Weinstein, The Forgotten Network: DuMont and the Birth of American Television (Philadelphia: Temple University Press, 2004) ISBN 1-59213-245-6
- Alex McNeil, Total Television, Fourth edition (New York: Penguin Books, 1980) ISBN 0-14-024916-8
- Tim Brooks and Earle Marsh, The Complete Directory to Prime Time Network TV Shows, Third edition (New York: Ballantine Books, 1964) ISBN 0-345-31864-1
