= Patricia Wheel =

American actress

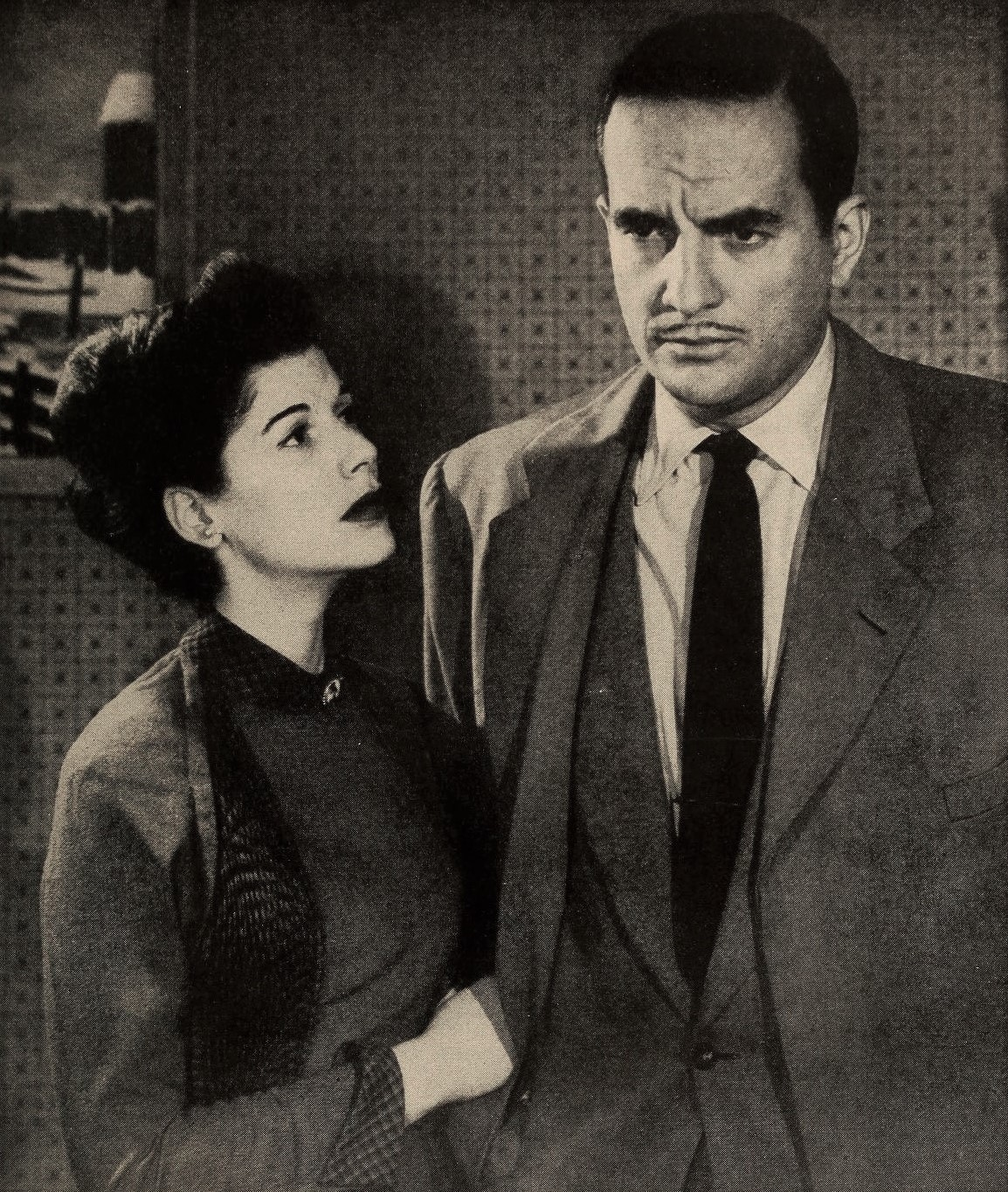
- Wheel with Donald Curtis, 1953
- Born: December 9, 1925; New York City, U.S.
- Died: June 3, 1986 (aged 60); New York City, U.S.
- Occupation: Actress
- Years active: 1949–1976
- Spouse: Eric Henry Alba Teran (m. 1954)
- Children: 2

Patricia Wheel (December 9, 1925 – June 3, 1986) was an American actress who appeared in films and TV series from the 1940s to the 1970s.

== Early years ==
Wheel was the daughter of Lester H. Wheel and his wife, Helene, and she had a sister, Lesley. She was born in New York City in 1925. She graduated from St. Agatha's school in New York and attended Hunter Model School. When she was 15, she received a dramatic scholarship and performed with a Long Island summer stock company.

== Career ==
During World War II, Wheel participated in a six-month USO tour through the South Pacific. Her activities with the troupe included tap dancing and acting in a production of Doughgirls. She also presented plays using people selected from the military personnel at Army camps.

Wheel began her acting career in 1949, appearing in TV series like A Woman to Remember, Ford Theatre, Cameo Theatre, Somerset Maugham TV Theatre, The Billy Rose Show, and Lux Video Theatre among others.

She also appeared in the films Cry Uncle! and Jeremy. In the 1950s she had the title role in The Doctor's Wife, a soap opera on NBC radio.

Wheel appeared in several Broadway Productions during the 1950s and 1960s like Cyrano de Bergerac, Charley's Aunt and Butterflies Are Free.

== Personal life and death ==
On September 27, 1954, Wheel married industrial designer Eric Henry Alba Teran. They had two sons, Andrew and Timothy Teran. She died on June 3, 1986, aged 61, in New York City after a long illness.

== Selected filmography ==
=== Film ===
- Cry Uncle! (1971)
- Jeremy (1973)

=== Television ===
- A Woman to Remember (1949)
- Ford Theatre (1950)
- Cameo Theatre (1950)
- Somerset Maugham TV Theatre (1950)
- The Billy Rose Show (1951)
- Lux Video Theatre (1951)
- The Web (1951)
- The Guiding Light (1952)
- Kraft Television Theatre (1950–1954)
- Westinghouse Studio One (1952–1954)
- Producers' Showcase (1955)
- Armstrong Circle Theatre (1950–1959)
- The United States Steel Hour (1954–1961)
- Naked City (1961–1962)
- The Defenders (1964)
- For the People (1965)
- Coronet Blue (1967)
- The Doctors (1973)
- The Adams Chronicles (1976)
