= The Singing Lady (TV series) =

- Directed by: Blair Walker
- Presented by: Bob Dixon
- Starring: Ireene Wicker
- Composer: Allan Grant
- Country of origin: United States

Production
- Producer: Blair Walker

Original release
- Network: ABC
- Release: August 12, 1948 – August 6, 1950

The Singing Lady is an American children's television program that was broadcast on ABC August 12, 1948 - August 6, 1950.

== Format ==
The Singing Lady starred Ireene Wicker, whose children's radio program of the same name won 24 awards, and now was "releasing her old magic in a new medium . . . television". Bob Dixon, the announcer, assumed the character of Mr. Mittens and performed magic tricks.

The Suzari Marionettes initially enacted fairy tales on the program, with Wicker supplying all of the characters' voices — as many as 19 in one episode — off-camera. She also provided background narration. Over time the format expanded to include the childhoods of famous people, re-creations of historic events, and depictions of travel adventures.

Fairy tales presented on the program were sometimes modified from their original versions. In the show's version of "Cinderella" the sisters and stepmother were allowed to repent and vow to behave themselves, whereas the king ordered them beheaded in the original version. In "Hansel and Gretel", the wicked witch's desire to bake Hansel and Gretel in an oven and eat them was changed to her wanting to put them in the oven and have them come out as gingerbread men.

== Production ==
Allan Grant composed the program's music and provided accompaniment for episodes. Blair Walker was the producer and director. Esther Carter designed costumes for the marionettes. After Dixon, Dick Collier and John Griggs were announcers in 1949 and 1950, respectively.

When the program debuted, it used a single stage, and episodes typically had six or fewer characters. By July 1950 it used three stages "with miniatures, revolving scenery, film effects and optical illusions for backgrounds".

The program initially was sustaining but when ABC expanded its coverage from the Eastern United States to the Midwest via coaxial cable, Kellogg's cereals began sponsoring it.

== Critical reception ==
A review of the August 19, 1948, episode of The Singing Lady in the trade publication Billboard described the program as "one of the most diverting moppet shows to face the cameras, one which is considerably more entertaining for adults than a great many shows which are ostensibly for the grown-ups". The review commended Wicker's "wonderful knack of switching voice ranges to take all parts" and complimented the integration of puppets with the story.

An article in The Boston Globe described the program's format as "a delightful fairy-land trip which could not possibly be made more enjoyable for children between three and seven".

== Red Channels accusations ==
Kellogg ended its sponsorship of The Singing Lady after Wicker's name was listed in the publication Red Channels: The Report of Communist Influence in Radio and Television. She described the timing of the company's decision as a "curious coincidence". A Kellogg representative called the cancellation "simply a matter of business", saying that the program's ratings were less than what company officials expected.

Wicker said that she opposed Communism and pointed out that many episodes of her program featured "childhood stories of famous American heroes". She added, "Much of my work is deeply religious". Theodore C. Kirkpatrick, one of the people responsible for publishing Red Channels, responded, "Just being religious is negative; what have you done positive against Communism?"

Wicker persevered through a court case "to the point of retraction". Newspaper columnist Alice Hughes wrote, "But the damage is done; her radio and TV contracts were cancelled and the legal fees were costly to procure denial of an unproved charge . . ."
