= The Vincent Lopez Show =

- Also known as: Vincent Lopez Speaking
- Starring: Vincent Lopez (conductor); Ray Barr; Lee Russell; Barry Valentino; Ann Warren
- Country of origin: United States

Production
- Running time: 15 minutes (approx. 12 minutes minus ads, 1949-1950); 30 minutes (approx. 25 minutes minus ads, 1957)

Original release
- Network: DuMont (1949-1950); CBS (1957)
- Release: March 7, 1949 – March 9, 1957

The Vincent Lopez Show, also known as Vincent Lopez Speaking, is a 1949-1957 American musical television program hosted by Vincent Lopez and broadcast on the DuMont Television Network, and later on CBS Television. The latter title is a take-off on Lopez's introduction on his longtime radio show: "Lopez speaking!"

== Broadcast history ==
The series ran from 1949 to 1950 on DuMont and from February to March 1957 on CBS. Lopez also hosted a 30-minute DuMont series Dinner Date, which aired live from the Grill Room at the Hotel Taft in New York City, Saturdays at 8pm ET from January to July 1950.

From March to May 1949, the show aired from 6:45 to 7pm ET every Monday, Wednesday, and Friday on most DuMont affiliates. From May to July 1949, the series aired Monday through Friday in the same time slot. From July 1949 to June 1950, the series aired Monday through Friday from 7:30 to 7:45pm ET. Music programs aired in a 15-minute time-slot were common at the time.

According to the book What Women Watched: Daytime Television in the 1950s (University of Texas Press, 2005) by Marsha Cassidy, Vincent Lopez Speaking also aired from 3:15 to 3:30pm ET on DuMont. According to the book, the DuMont daytime schedule beginning in January 1949 was:

- 10-10:30am Johnny Olson's Rumpus Room
- 10:30-11am Welcome, Neighbors
- 11am-12noon The Stan Shaw Show
- 12noon-12:15pm Amanda
- 12:15-12:30pm Man in the Street
- 12:30-12:45pm Camera Headlines
- 12:45-1pm Fashions in Song
- 1-1:30pm Okay, Mother
- 2:30-3pm Inside Photoplay (The Wendy Barrie Show)
- 3-3:15pm The Needle Shop
- 3:15-3:30pm Vincent Lopez Speaking (The Vincent Lopez Show)

== CBS Television version ==
Six years later, Lopez hosted a similar program on CBS Television. The DuMont version featured notable performers including Ray Barr, Lee Russell, Barry Valentino, and Ann Warren, all series regulars. Dinner Date also featured guest stars such as Cab Calloway, Arthur Tracy, and Woody Herman.

Lopez's show went on CBS's nationwide network after it debuted as a local program in New York City. Performers included Judy Lynn, Teddy Norman, Eddie O'Connor, Johnny Messner, Johnny Amorosa, and Danny Davis. The half-hour program was broadcast from New York at 7 p.m. Eastern Time on Saturdays.

== Episode status ==
A single kinescope of a 1950 episode survives at the UCLA Film and Television Archive.

== See also ==
- List of programs broadcast by the DuMont Television Network
- List of surviving DuMont Television Network broadcasts
- 1949-50 United States network television schedule
- Dinner Date (January to July 1950) also hosted by Lopez

== Bibliography ==
- David Weinstein, The Forgotten Network: DuMont and the Birth of American Television (Philadelphia: Temple University Press, 2004) ISBN 1-59213-245-6
- Alex McNeil, Total Television, Fourth edition (New York: Penguin Books, 1980) ISBN 0-14-024916-8
- Tim Brooks and Earle Marsh, The Complete Directory to Prime Time Network TV Shows, Third edition (New York: Ballantine Books, 1964) ISBN 0-345-31864-1
