= Camera Headlines =

- Country of origin: United States

Production
- Running time: 15/30 minutes

Original release
- Network: DuMont Television Network
- Release: January 1948 – 1949

Camera Headlines is an early American television series that aired from January 1948 to 1949 on the DuMont Television Network.

== Broadcast history ==
DuMont's previous national news program, The Walter Compton News, had premiered on DuMont station WTTG in June 1947, then on the DuMont network on August 25, 1947, but was off the air by January 1948. This show had movie publicist Compton (1912-1959) reading news from a script with the occasional use of slides.

Premiering in January 1948, Camera Headlines was an attempt by DuMont to present a TV news program using newsreel film footage. As with some other early television programs, there is conflicting information about the show, with some sources reporting that the series was 30 minutes long, while other sources stating it was 15 minutes long. Camera Headlines aired Monday through Friday at 7:30 pm Eastern Time, with I.N.S. Telenews following at 7:45pm on Tuesdays only.

Camera Headlines also aired weekdays 12:30 to 12:45pm ET. The DuMont daytime schedule beginning in January 1949 was:

- 10-10:30am Johnny Olson's Rumpus Room
- 10:30-11am Welcome, Neighbors
- 11am-12noon The Stan Shaw Show
- 12noon-12:15pm Amanda
- 12:15-12:30pm Man in the Street
- 12:30-12:45pm Camera Headlines
- 12:45-1pm Fashions in Song
- 1-1:30pm Okay, Mother
- 2:30-3pm Inside Photoplay (The Wendy Barrie Show)
- 3-3:15pm The Needle Shop
- 3:15-3:30pm Vincent Lopez Speaking (The Vincent Lopez Show)

== Episode status ==
As with most DuMont programs, no episodes of Camera Headlines are known to survive. Little else is known about the series, even though it aired on a major United States television network.

== See also ==
- The Walter Compton News
- I.N.S. Telenews
- DuMont Evening News
- Television news in the United States
- List of programs broadcast by the DuMont Television Network
- List of surviving DuMont Television Network broadcasts
- 1948-49 United States network television schedule

== Bibliography ==
- David Weinstein, The Forgotten Network: DuMont and the Birth of American Television (Philadelphia: Temple University Press, 2004) ISBN 1-59213-245-6
- Alex McNeil, Total Television, Fourth edition (New York: Penguin Books, 1980) ISBN 0-14-024916-8
- Tim Brooks and Earle Marsh, The Complete Directory to Prime Time Network TV Shows, Third edition (New York: Ballantine Books, 1964) ISBN 0-345-31864-1
