= TV Shopper =

- Presented by: Kathi Norris
- Country of origin: United States

Production
- Running time: 30 minutes

Original release
- Network: DuMont
- Release: November 1, 1948 – December 1, 1950

TV Shopper, also known as Your Television Shopper or Kathi Norris' Television Shopper, is an early American daytime television series which aired on the DuMont Television Network at 10:30 am ET from November 1, 1948 to December 1, 1950.

The show was hosted by Kathi Norris, also host of DuMont's Spin the Picture, and was an early example of a TV shopping show. Johnny Stearns recalled that his wife Mary Kay had received an offer to be a model for this or a similar program, but, at his request, refused and instead did television's first sitcom, Mary Kay and Johnny.

== Overview ==
The program evolved from Norris's experiences as a wife and mother, when she gathered with other women in her neighborhood for coffee and conversation, which usually related to shopping. The show's concept was that she was dropping into viewers' homes to chat with them. In preparation for broadcasts, Norris shopped, looking for "good buys, new gadgets and interesting gimmicks". After she presented her discoveries on the program, viewers who liked the items could order them with help from the program's seven-person staff.

== Episode status ==
As with most DuMont Network programs, no episodes of TV Shopper are known to survive today.

== See also ==
- List of programs broadcast by the DuMont Television Network
- List of surviving DuMont Television Network broadcasts
- 1948–49 United States network television schedule (daytime)
- 1949–50 United States network television schedule (daytime)

== Bibliography ==
- David Weinstein, The Forgotten Network: DuMont and the Birth of American Television (Philadelphia: Temple University Press, 2004) ISBN 1-59213-245-6
- Alex McNeil, Total Television, Fourth edition (New York: Penguin Books, 1980) ISBN 0-14-024916-8
- Tim Brooks and Earle Marsh, The Complete Directory to Prime Time Network TV Shows, Third edition (New York: Ballantine Books, 1964) ISBN 0-345-31864-1
