= Ruth McDevitt =

American actress (1895–1976)

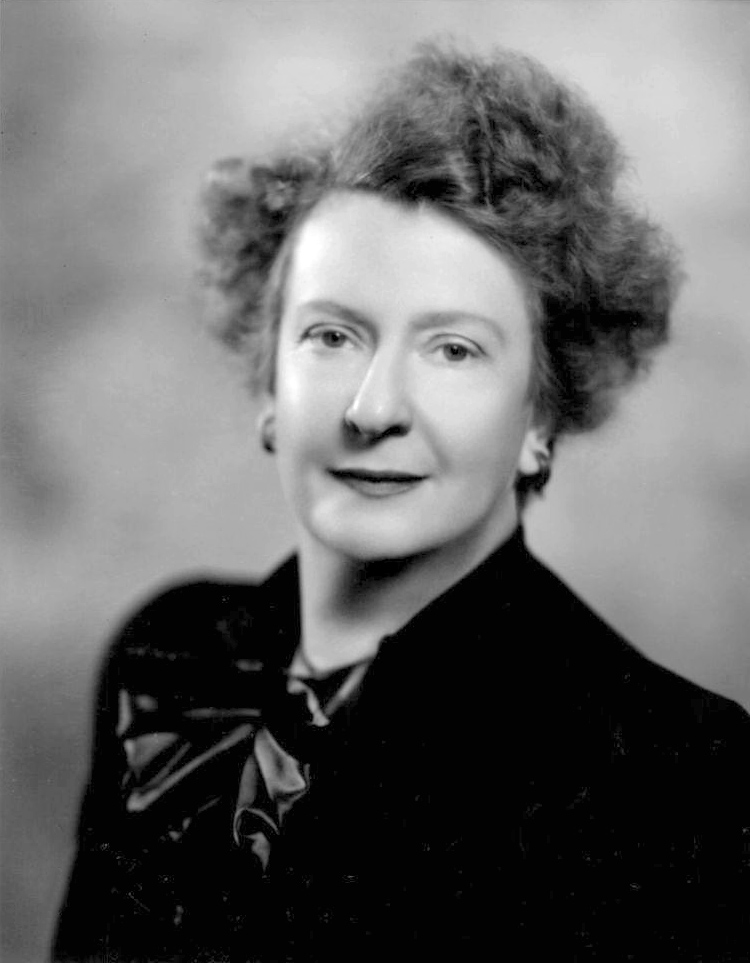
- McDevitt in 1950
- Born: Ruth Thane Shoecraft; September 13, 1895; Coldwater, Michigan, U.S.
- Died: May 27, 1976 (aged 80); Hollywood, California, U.S.
- Other name: Ruth Thane McDevitt
- Occupation: Actress
- Years active: 1949–1976
- Spouse: Patrick McDevitt (m. 1928; died 1934)

Ruth Thane McDevitt (née Shoecraft; September 13, 1895 – May 27, 1976) was an American film, stage, radio, and television actress.

== Career ==
The daughter of John Barnabas Shoecraft and Elizabeth Imber Shoecraft, McDevitt was born in Coldwater, Michigan, but grew up in Ohio. After attending the American Academy of Dramatic Arts, she married Patrick McDevitt on December 10, 1928, and decided to devote her time to her marriage. After her husband's death in 1934, she returned to acting. She made her debut on Broadway in 1940, and succeeded her friend Josephine Hull in Arsenic and Old Lace, Harvey, and The Solid Gold Cadillac.

McDevitt also acted on radio, portraying the title character's mother in Keeping up with Rosemary and Jane in This Life Is Mine.

On television, McDevitt portrayed Bessie Thatcher in the DuMont drama A Woman to Remember (1949). She played Mom Peepers in the 1950s sitcom Mister Peepers and Grandma Hanks on CBS's Pistols 'n' Petticoats. She was a regular on The Everly Brothers Show and the NBC soap Bright Promise from September 1969 to June 1970. McDevitt also had a regular role as Emily Cowles on Kolchak: the Night Stalker, starring Darren McGavin.

McDevitt guest starred in such series as Suspense, Cosmopolitan Theatre, Decoy, The United States Steel Hour, Westinghouse Studio One, The Alfred Hitchcock Hour (2 episodes), The Andy Griffith Show (2 episodes), The Debbie Reynolds Show, The Ghost & Mrs. Muir, Mayberry R.F.D., I Dream of Jeannie, Bewitched (3 episodes), The Courtship of Eddie's Father, Love, American Style, That Girl, Nanny and the Professor, Room 222, Mannix (2 episodes), Here's Lucy, Gunsmoke, Marcus Welby, M.D., Phyllis, Little House on the Prairie, The Streets of San Francisco, Naked City, and All in the Family (on which she had a recurring role during 1974 and 1975).

Her film debut was in The Guy Who Came Back (1951), followed by memorable roles in The Parent Trap (as camp counselor Miss Inch), Alfred Hitchcock's The Birds (as Mrs. MacGruder, the pet store saleslady), Boys' Night Out, Dear Heart, The Shakiest Gun in the West, Angel in My Pocket, The Love God?, Change of Habit, The War Between Men and Women, and Mixed Company.

== Death ==
McDevitt died, aged 80, in Hollywood, Los Angeles, California and is interred in Westwood Village Memorial Park Cemetery.

== Filmography ==
Film
Year	Title	Role	Notes
1951	The Guy Who Came Back	Grandma	
1953	The Long, Long Trailer	Mrs. Vagabond	Uncredited
1961	The Parent Trap	Miss Inch	
1962	Boys Night Out	Beulah Partridge	
1963	The Birds	Mrs. MacGruder, bird shop employee	
1963	Love Is a Ball	Mathilda, grandmother	
1964	Dear Heart	Miss Tait	
1968	The Shakiest Gun in the West	Mrs. Olive Heywood	with film's star Don Knotts
1969	Angel in My Pocket	Nadine	with Andy Griffith
1969	The Love God?	Miss Keezy	with film's star Don Knotts
1969	Change of Habit	Lily	
1972	The War Between Men and Women	Old woman	
1974	Mame	Cousin Fan	
1974	Homebodies	Mrs. Loomis	
1974	Mixed Company	Miss Bergquist	

Television
Year	Title	Role	Notes
1949	A Woman to Remember	Bessie Thatcher	Unknown episodes
1958	Harbourmaster	Mrs. Markham	1 episode
1958	Omnibus	Ewa	1 episode
1961	Naked City	Mrs. Abbie Dobbins	1 episode
1962	The Nurses	Miss Dillion	1 episode
1962	Dr. Kildare	Adele Fromm, RN	1 episode
1963	The Alfred Hitchcock Hour	Mrs. Fister	Season 2 Episode 8: "The Cadaver"
1964	The Alfred Hitchcock Hour	Miss Emmy Wright	Season 2 Episode 24: "The Gentleman Caller"
1964	Route 66	Mrs. Harris	1 episode
1964	The Doctors	Mrs. McMurtrie	Unknown episodes
1966–1967	Pistols 'n' Petticoats	Grandma Effie Hanks	26 episodes
1967	Bewitched	The Queen Ticheba / Mrs Parsons / Aunt Millicent	3 episodes
1968	The Andy Griffith Show	Mrs. Pendleton	2 episodes
1969	The Debbie Reynolds Show	Mrs. Patterson	1 episode
1969	Bright Promise	Clara Ryan	September 29, 1969 to June 1970
1970	The Courtship of Eddie's Father	Miss Bristol	1 episode
1970	That Girl	Aunt Belle	1 episode
1970-1974	Marcus Welby, M.D.	Mrs. Pryor/Mrs. Davis	2 episodes
1971	The New Andy Griffith Show	Mrs. Gossage	3 episodes
1971	Nanny and the Professor	Mrs. Rumble	1 episode
1971	In Search of America	Grandma Rose	ABC Movie of the Week
1972	Room 222	Miss Brown/Vivian Higgins	2 episodes
1973	The New Dick Van Dyke Show	Mrs. Ferguson	1 episode
1973	The Girl Most Likely to...	Housemistress	ABC Movie of the Week
1973-1975	All In the Family	Josephine "Jo" Nelson	3 episodes
1974	Kojak	Mrs. Farenkrug	12 episodes
1974	Gunsmoke	Grandma Boggs	"The Tainted Badge" (S20E9)
1974	McCloud	Landlady	1 episode
1974	Little House on the Prairie	Maddie Elder	1 Episode
1974	Skyway to Death	Aunt Louise	ABC Movie of the Week
1974	The Rookies	Mrs. Lockett	Episode: "Blue Christmas"
1974	Run, Joe, Run	Antique Dealer	Episode: "Little Old Lady Antique Dealer"
1974-1975	Emergency!	Mrs. Quincy/Mrs. Blaine	2 episodes
1974–1975	Kolchak: The Night Stalker	Emily Cowles	12 episodes
1975	The Abduction of Saint Anne	Sister Patrick	ABC Movie of the Week
1975	Phyllis	Miss McDermott	1 episode
1975	Ellery Queen	Zelda Van Dyke	1 episode
1975	Medical Center	Alice	1 episode

She also appeared in a The Streets of San Francisco episode "Winterkill" from season 2 on December 13, 1973. She also appeared in a I Dream of Jeannie episode "The Blood of Jeannie" from season 5 on Oct 28, 1969 episode 7.
