= Victor Hammer (businessman) =

American art dealer (1901–1985)

- Born: November 1, 1901; New York City, U.S.
- Died: July 21, 1985 (aged 83); New York City, U.S.
- Education: Princeton University (B.A.)
- Spouses: Barbara (div. 1928) Ireene Wicker (m. 1941)
- Children: 2
- Relatives: Armand Hammer (brother)

Victor J. Hammer (November 1, 1901 – July 21, 1985) was an American businessman, the founder and owner of Hammer Galleries in New York City, and a philanthropist.

== Early life and education ==
Hammer was born in New York City, to Ukrainian-born Jewish immigrants, Julius and Rose (née Lipshitz) Hammer. His father came to the United States from Odessa in the Russian Empire (today Ukraine) in 1875, and settled in The Bronx, where he ran a general medical practice and five drugstores. Victor Hammer attended Princeton University, where he graduated in 1921 with a degree in art history. His older brother was businessman Armand Hammer.

== Career ==
He was business partner of his brother Armand on several business ventures, including Hammer Galleries in New York City, founded in 1928 as a way to funnel profits made in the Soviet Union out of that country. At one point, British Intelligence believed Hammer Galleries was a front for Soviet Intelligence.

In fact, according to the KGB documents copied by Alexander Vassiliev, Victor Hammer was recruited by OGPU in 1931. In 1951-53 he had some contacts with Soviet intelligence operatives in the USA, but was unable to provide any valuable information.

The Hammer brothers had been in contact with Soviet authorities for a number of reasons, such as famine relief, as well as when the Soviets sought a buyer for the treasures of the Hermitage Museum as a way to earn hard currency. Victor was responsible for acquisitions for Hammer Galleries, including the so-called Romanov Treasures and Fabergé eggs. In 1937, Time described Victor and Armand as "Two of the most startling characters in the U.S. art world are the Brothers Armand and Victor Hammer, one with a medical degree, both friends of Soviet Russia."

According to Fabergé expert Geza von Habsburg, Victor stated that Stalin's trade commissar Anastas Mikoyan provided Fabergé hallmarking tools to his brother Armand to sell fakes. Victor stated a 1938 New York sale he ran with Armand, which grossed several million dollars, consisted of both genuine and faked items (called Fauxbergé by Habsburg), with commissions going back to Mikoyan.

== Philanthropy ==
Hammer was a philanthropist. Alongside his brothers Harry and Armand, he purchased the Roosevelt estate on Campobello Island in New Brunswick and donated it to the United States and Canada as the countries' first joint park, known as Roosevelt Campobello International Park.

== Personal life ==
Hammer's first wife, Barbara, was a performer of gypsy romances. In 1927, their son Armand was born. They divorced in 1928. Hammer's second wife was Ireene Wicker; they had a daughter: Nancy Hammer Eilan.
