= The Singing Lady (radio series) =

American children's radio program (1932–1945)

The Singing Lady is an American children's radio program that was broadcast on the Blue Network beginning on January 11, 1932. It ended on ABC on September 7, 1945. It had "the largest daily audience of children in the history of radio" (at least up to 1939), and it won awards for NBC. In 1945 the program was syndicated by the World Broadcasting System, with 52 episodes available.

== Background ==
The Kellogg Company's desire to have a radio program oriented toward children led to the creation of The Singing Lady. Officials at WGN in Chicago acted on the cereal company's wishes by designating Ireene Wicker, who was a character actress on WGN, to create a show. She was handed a list of nursery rhymes and told to do a children's program. Realizing that nursery rhymes and music alone would be insufficient to keep the program on the air for very long, Wicker developed dramatizations of fairy tales and played each role herself. In doing so she adapted singing and storytelling techniques that she had used with her own children.

The show debuted on April 6, 1931, as a local program on WGN. Broadcast from 5:15 to 5:30 p.m. Central Time Monday-Saturday, it featured music, stories about children in other countries, and stories about nursery-rhyme characters such as Tom Thumb, Jack the Giant Killer, and Little Boy Blue. A full-page advertisement in the April 5, 1931, issue of the Chicago Tribune promoted the program as helping mothers because it was scheduled "to entertain the children at one of the busiest times of your day". It added that in addition to providing entertainment for children, the program "will teach them many constructive things". Effective July 6, 1931, the program was moved to 6 p.m. C. T.

Initially the Singing Lady's identity was "a great mystery"; Wicker's name was withheld from the public. At one point, reports had her incorrectly identified as Edna Kellogg. A representative of the N. W. Ayer & Son advertising agency that represented the sponsor said that Kellogg was not the woman on the program. The identity was being kept a mystery to avoid disturbing the imaginations of children who listened to the show. Wicker's identity was revealed publicly in September 1933.

== Overview ==
The Singing Lady stood out over other programs of its era that provided music for children and related stories to them. An article in the December 1937 issue of Radio Stars magazine attributed the program's success partially to a combination of Wicker's personality, her ability to select songs that children liked, and her knack for telling stories, "but even more than any of these," it said, "it's due to the fact that she really understands" children. As a result, "In cities and on farms and in trailers, childrcn sit with their ears glued to the radio and mothers can go about their tasks or relax", content that their little ones would remain absorbed in the program.

In addition to performing, Wicker wrote all of the songs that she sang on the show — approximately three new songs for each episode. She wrote the prose segments of the show based on research that she conducted using second-hand books that she bought.

By 1935 Wicker had expanded the scope of her program from telling about fictional characters and historical characters to include stories about childhood activities of living celebrities. As she did so she realized that most people who achieved success as adults had been encouraged by their parents when they were children. Material for those segments came from her interviews with the celebrities. Some, like Mary Pickford and George Gershwin cooperated readily. (Gershwin also provided some of his unpublished music for her to use on the show.) Leopold Stokowski refused to provide any information about his life before he became well-known, and an agent for one potential subject asked for $5,000 to feature her.

The Singing Lady was radio's top-rated children's program from 1931 to 1936. In August 1935 Kellogg's president noted that one indication of the size of the audience was that "we have received as many as 100,000 box tops in a single week".

In June 1936 origination of the program was moved from Chicago to Radio City studios in New York.

== Ireene Wicker's Music Plays ==
On December 11, 1938, Ireene Wicker's Music Plays debuted on NBC; it ended on May 7, 1939. The format was similar to that of Let's Pretend, with the programs differing primarily in how they used music. On Let's Pretend, music was incidental, but on Music Plays, "the musical contributions are essential furnishings to each half hour and consume a large proportion of the air time". In contrast to The Singing Lady, in which Wicker was the sole speaker with instrumental accompaniment, Music Plays had professional actors, an orchestra, and a children's chorus. Wicker was still the main performer, however, playing leading roles and singing solos. Performers who were heard on the show included Agnes Moorehead, Junius Matthews, and Florence Malone.

== Promotions ==
In June 1932 sending in the top from a box of Kellogg's Corn Flakes brought a listener a Kellogg Treasure Chest. The chest contained "the story of the Treasure Hunt, details of the Kellogg Game Book, and trial packages of Kellogg's Corn Flakes, Pep, Rice Krispies and All-Bran".

In November 1935 Kellogg's offered cash prizes totalling $9,000 for letters providing "new ideas for new story material" for The Singing Lady. A full-page advertisement in Radio Stars magazine contained a letter from Wicker saying, "Please write me a letter telling the kind of stories you think children like best. Or give a brief suggestion for new story ideas — the kind your children — or children you know — enjoy most." The page included a list of specific prizes, ranging from $1,000 for the best letter to $5 each for 1,000 letters at the low end of the scale.

One promotion offered a copy of Wicker's song book to each person who sent in box tops from Kellogg's packages. At one point approximately 14,000 submissions arrived per day, requiring 38 people to process the requests. An article in the trade publication Heinl Radio Business Letter said that indicated "nearly 100,000 sales of Kellogg products every week".

== Popularity ==
During the program's tenure, Wicker's personal appearances in department stores sometimes "actually jammed the stores with mothers and children". When it was transmitted to Europe via short wave broadcasts, its popularity there almost matched what it had in the United States.

== Critical response ==
An article in the December 1934 issue of Radio Stars described The Singing Lady as "soothing, entertaining and minus blood curdling tales." and called it "the kindergarten of the air and a broadcast that any mother can trust. The article added that the program "has raised children's programs to a high level".

The program was the only children's show recommended by the National Organization of Parent-Teachers Association. The Michigan Child Study Association designated it as the finest radio program for children, and it was the only children's show to receive the Distinguished Service to Radio medal from Radio Stars.
