= Jo Maeder =

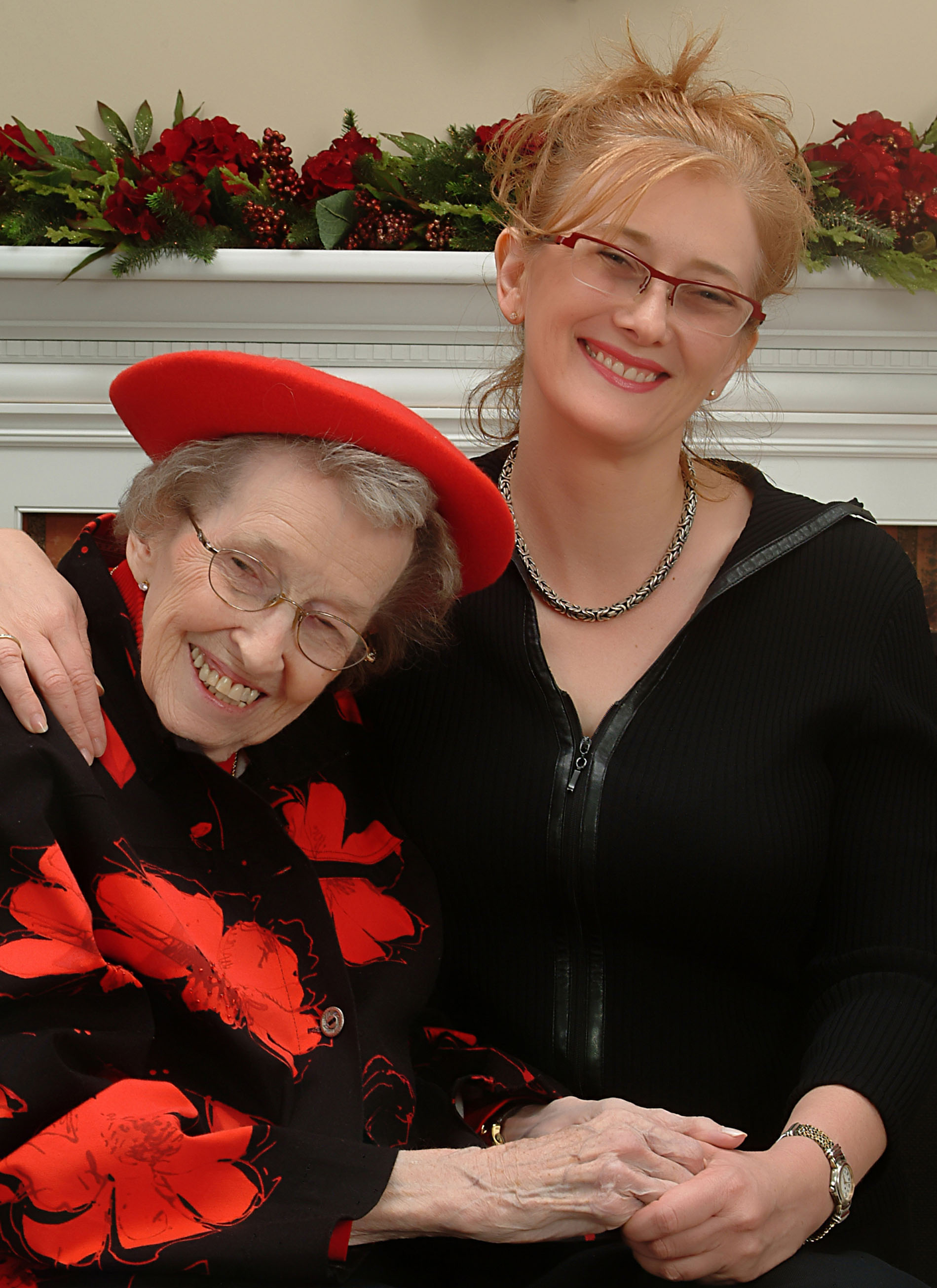
Photo of Jo Maeder with Mama Jo, subject of the memoir "When I Married My Mother"

Jo Maeder is an American writer and voiceover artist.

== Biography ==
Maeder is the author of the memoir When I Married My Mother. She has written for The New York Times, Vanity Fair, and More Magazine. In 1977, after spotting station bumper stickers and giving away prizes as Y100/Miami's "Y-onic Woman", she became their first female disc jockey, and one of the first female Top 40 DJs in the United States. Her air name was "The Madame." She was the first woman in that market to host a morning drive radio program: "Up and At 'Em with the Madame" on WINZ-FM/I-95. In 1984 she joined Jay Thomas as co-host of the WKTU/New York morning show. On July 13, 1985, WKTU became WXRK/K-Rock and she became known as "The Rock and Roll Madame". In addition to playing classic rock, she hosted "Knockin' On Dylan's Door", a weekly show that showcased and discussed the music of Bob Dylan, and "Bluesbreakers" that highlighted several blues songs. Her show often followed Howard Stern's in the six more years she remained with the station. In 1993 she co-hosted a talk show on WABC as herself, and in 1995 she joined Z100 using her real name. From 1995 to 2000 she taught a course on radio for N.Y.U.'s continuing education department. Her interview subjects included Bob Marley, Michael Jackson, Willie Dixon, Stevie Ray Vaughan, George Michael, the Bee Gees and many more.

On April 13, 2011, she organized and hosted the first Triad "Bookup" at Bin 33 restaurant in Greensboro, NC, to "promote long-form reading in a short-form world." The public was invited to show up with any book of their choosing and read it to themselves. Maya Angelou issued a statement supporting the concept.

Opposites Attack was published April 22, 2013. Her novel Naked DJ, based on her long radio career, was published May 18, 2016. Zerk 'Em and Pull the Push Rods: A Wry Squint at Aviation in the Mid-20th Century was co-authored with her late father 33 years after his passing and published September 25, 2018.

On August 21, 2012, Maeder opened Mama Jo's House of Dolls on collectibles site Ruby Lane to find homes for her mother's vast doll collection. While all dolls were sold, many can be seen on the Facebook page for the shop and Pinterest page. Her essay about the pain and joy of doing this appeared in The New York Times on May 9, 2013. A short film about the dolls, Jacob Rosdail's The Doll Dilemma, was shown in several film festivals.
