= A Woman to Remember =

American TV soap opera

- Genre: Soap opera
- Created by: John Haggart
- Written by: John Haggart
- Directed by: Bob Steele
- Starring: Patricia Wheel; Joan Catlin; John Raby; Ruth McDevitt; Frankie Thomas
- Country of origin: United States
- Original language: English

Production
- Producer: Bob Steele
- Running time: 15 minutes

Original release
- Network: DuMont
- Release: February 21 – July 15, 1949

A Woman to Remember is a soap opera which ran on the DuMont Television Network from February 21 to July 15, 1949. The show began on February 21 as a daytime series at 3 pm ET. However, starting May 2, the show moved to nighttime, airing Monday through Friday from 7:30 to 7:45 pm ET.

John Haggart was the writer, and Bob Steel was the director. The 7:30 pm version of the show followed Captain Video and His Video Rangers and had no sponsor.

The series is believed to be lost.

== Synopsis ==
The soap opera featured a story within a story. Set in a radio studio, it had actors portraying the director, technicians, and other personnel of inner soap opera. The director's replacing a regular actor with a detested new actor led to conflicts within the company.

== Cast and characters ==
The main focus of A Woman to Remember was the backstage drama of a radio serial. Radio soap opera star Christine Baker (Patricia Wheel) was the central heroine who had to spend much of her time dealing with malicious Carol Winstead (Joan Catlin), who fought against her both at work and in Christine's relationship with Steve Hammond (John Raby). Other characters included Christine's actress pal Bessie Thatcher (Ruth McDevitt) and sound man Charley Anderson (Frankie Thomas). Thomas would later star in popular series Tom Corbett, Space Cadet. His mother, Mona Bruns (who appeared on many soaps), had a small part on the show and described the backstage atmosphere as very hectic.

== Production ==
The show was broadcast live from a tiny radio studio in Wanamaker's Department Store, Philadelphia, with a budget of $1,750 a week, a three-hour rehearsal period, and, at most, two TV cameras. The studio bathroom was used as the dressing room, there was little ventilation, the sets were cheap and the actors were barely paid. One day, the air conditioning broke down and five technicians fainted from heat exhaustion. Bruns had to say, "I've just had a tooth pulled," but was so delirious, she said (live on air), "I've just had a pooth tulled." The actors struggled not to laugh, which kept them from fainting from the heat. Leading man Raby once had a scene with an actress who panicked once the broadcast began. She tried to flee the set, but he pushed her into a chair and kept her there. He blurted out, "I can guess what you came to tell me," and proceeded to recite all of her dialogue, along with his own lines. After the scene ended he went to the bathroom and threw up.

For many years, A Woman to Remember was considered the first television soap opera, due to some magazine articles which erroneously claimed the series debuted in 1947. However, DuMont's Faraway Hill, which ran for several months in 1946, is now considered the first soap opera on television.

== Critical response ==
A review in the trade publication Variety said that A Woman to Remember "succeeds in shaping the soap opera formula to television's requirements." It commended the writing for containing "honest, simple dialog."

== See also ==
- List of programs broadcast by the DuMont Television Network
- List of surviving DuMont Television Network broadcasts
- 1948–49 United States network television schedule (weekday)

== Bibliography ==
- David Weinstein, The Forgotten Network: DuMont and the Birth of American Television (Philadelphia: Temple University Press, 2004) ISBN 1-59213-245-6
- Alex McNeil, Total Television, Fourth edition (New York: Penguin Books, 1980) ISBN 0-14-024916-8
- Tim Brooks and Earle Marsh, The Complete Directory to Prime Time Network and Cable TV Shows, Ninth edition (New York: Ballantine Books, 2007) ISBN 978-0-345-49773-4
