= Vanity Fair (American TV series) =

American TV talk series (1948–1951)

- Country of origin: United States
- Original language: English

Original release
- Network: CBS
- Release: October 12, 1948 – November 2, 1951

Vanity Fair is an American daytime television talk show, the first CBS daytime TV program targeted at women. It began on October 12, 1948, and ended on November 2, 1951.

== Background ==
Vanity Fair began in October 1948 as a local program broadcast two times a week on WCBS-TV in New York City. It gained network status when stations in Philadelphia and Washington, D. C. added it. CBS selected Dorothy Doan as hostess, "desiring a reporter rather than an actress" to fill that role. Doan's background as a reporter for newspapers and the International News Service equipped her to cover topics beyond "fashion, beauty and cooking hints". She succeeded in doing so, "despite some opposition", and received enthusiastic response from the show's mostly female audience. Doan said in 1951 that she was told, "It's too bad that you aren't a little heavier and older." She explained, "They thought that was the only type who could sell a sponsor's product."

== Overview ==
The first segment of each episode usually dealt with how to do something around the house. During the second segment, the hostess usually interviewed a guest or guests, sometimes with a debate on a topic of interest. Topics debated on the show included "the Iranian oil problem and the unrest in Egypt". The setting for the interviews was a living room that resembled the one in Doan's home. It was her idea to use such a setting because that would make guests on the show feel more comfortable.

When more weekdays were added to the program's schedule, Robin Chandler became the hostess for some days. Models from Lilly Daché appeared regularly. Tony Marvin was the announcer, and Johnny Green provided music. Guests on the program included Morton Downey, Sherman Billingsley, James A. Michener, Maria Tallchief, Sarah Churchill, Joan Blondell, Mr. John, Marjorie Lawrence, Harriet Van Horne, Cleveland Amory, and Eleanor Roosevelt.

== Production ==
Frances Buss was the initial producer. She was followed in 1951 by Virginia Schone, who also wrote the program. Doan also was a producer in 1951. Dan Levin was the director. Two researchers gathered background material for each episode. In addition to Schone, writers included Shirley Reeser and Marcia Durant. Episodes originated in Liederkrantz Hall on East 58th Street in New York City and were transmitted from WCBS-TV. Sponsors included Maidenform bras and Air Wick.

== Critical response ==
The trade publication Ross Reports called Vanity Fair "a successful example of an established daytime program" at a time when daytime television was in its infancy. A review of the December 29, 1950, episode said, "Miss Doan presided in a relaxed manner" and noted that viewers were able to remain focused on the guests and conversation thanks to unobtrusive camera work.

A review of the October 12 and October 14, 1948, episodes in the trade publication Variety said, "CBS has come up with an engaging and adult matinee femme [sic] program. It is at all times informal and natural, yet informative and interesting." The review noted some production problems that needed to be resolved, but it concluded by saying that the program "shows promise of giving quite a boost" to TV programming targeted at women.
