= Ireene Wicker =

American actress

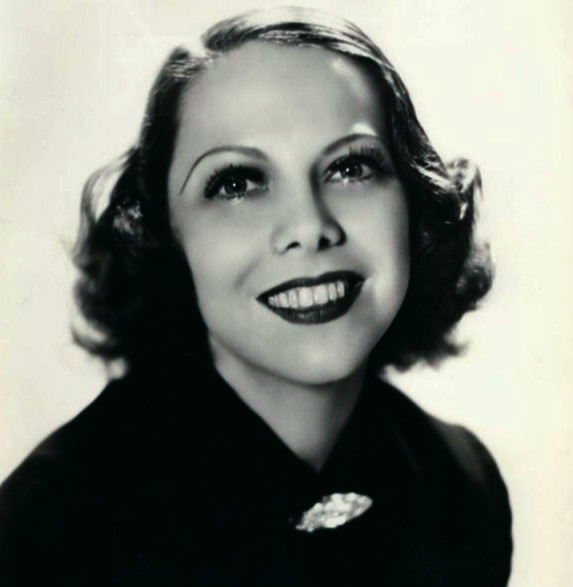
- Wicker in 1937
- Born: Irene Seaton; November 24, 1905; Quincy, Illinois, U.S.
- Died: November 17, 1987 (aged 81); West Palm Beach, Florida, U.S.
- Occupations: Singer, actress
- Spouse: Victor J. Hammer (m. 1941; died 1985)

Ireene Wicker (born Irene Seaton, November 24, 1905 – November 17, 1987) was an American singer and actress, best known to young radio listeners in the 1930s and 1940s as “The Singing Lady”, which was the title of her radio program. She added the second 'e' in her first name on the advice of an astrologer.

== Early years ==
Wicker's hometown was Quincy, Illinois. She left there at age 15 to go to the University of Illinois, where she said, "I took all the dramatic work there I could find." She studied at the Goodman School of the Theater in Chicago.

== Stage ==
Wicker appeared in professional roles at the Goodman Theatre in 1929 and 1930.

== Radio ==
Early in Wicker's radio career, she changed the spelling of her first name to Ireene, adding the extra "e" as she was told by a numerologist that one more letter would bring her great success.

Her radio show was first sponsored by the Kellogg Company, beginning in 1931. Her show was promoted as America’s first radio network program for children. Despite the title of her show, The Singing Lady, most of it involved Wicker telling adaptations of stories for children, ranging from fairy tales by the Brothers Grimm and Hans Christian Andersen through to Rudyard Kipling’s Just So Stories. Also in the 1930s and early 1940s, she portrayed Jane Lee on the serial Judy and Jane on NBC-Blue.

In the 1940s, Wicker was a regular on Deadline Dramas on NBC and the Blue Network. In the 1950s, she told stories on Big Jon and Sparkie on ABC radio.

== Television ==
Wicker came to television at WJZ-TV in 1949 with The Ireene Wicker Show in which she told fairy tales. She also had a program, The Singing Lady, on ABC-TV (1948-1950).

In 1950, Wicker was one of several broadcasters whose name was included in the book Red Channels, used by many organizations to blacklist anyone who was included as a supposed Communist "sympathizer". The book charged that she had sponsored a re-election committee for Benjamin J. Davis, a Communist councilman in New York. Although Wicker denied she had even heard of the man, her listing within Red Channels was followed – in what she herself described as a "curious coincidence" – by her sponsor, Kellogg, failing to renew her option for the ABC TV show. The charges by the House Un-American Activities Committee were later withdrawn with apologies. Another claim, that she sided with leftists during the Spanish Civil War, turned out to refer to her support of a fund-raising drive for Spanish refugee children.

Wicker returned to the ABC network in 1953-1954 with Little Lady Story Time, an unusual half-hour series. Here, she told classic fairy tales while a cast of juvenile ballet dancers enacted the storylines. The sponsor was Little Lady toiletries, a line of soaps, powders, and mild cosmetics for young girls. Among the stories produced were "Puss in Boots", "King Midas and the Golden Touch", "Little Red Riding Hood", and "Pinocchio". One episode ("The Green Monkey") of The Ireene Wicker Show and 15 kinescopes of it are housed at the Library of Congress in the J. Fred and Leslie W. MacDonald Collection.

== Personal life ==
Wicker married Walter Charles Wicker, a radio writer, producer, and actor; they had a son, Walter Charles Jr., who during World War II joined one of the Eagle Squadrons that served with the RAF and was killed in action over the English Channel, and a daughter, Nancy.

Her first marriage ended in divorce in 1938. In 1941, she became the second wife of businessman Victor J. Hammer.

== Recognition ==
On April 19, 1961, Wicker was recipient of a Peabody Award—Personal Award for Children's Programs for her weekly program, The Singing Lady on WNYC radio.

== Publication ==
- Ireene Wicker The Singing Lady's Favorite Stories (Whitman, 1934)
- Ireene Wicker Young Music Makers: Boyhoods of Famous Composers (The Bobbs-Merrill Company, 1961)
