= Scoreboard (TV series) =

- Also known as: Russ Hodges's Scoreboard
- Presented by: Russ Hodges
- Country of origin: United States
- No. of seasons: 1
- No. of episodes: 52

Production
- Running time: 15 minutes

Original release
- Network: DuMont
- Release: 14 April 1948 – 22 April 1949

Scoreboard, also known as Russ Hodges's Scoreboard, is a sports series aired on the DuMont Television Network on Fridays at 6:30pm ET from 14 April 1948 to 22 April 1949. The 15-minute show was hosted by sports announcer Russ Hodges.

== Episode status ==
As with many DuMont series, no episodes are known to exist in any film or television archive.

== See also ==
- List of programs broadcast by the DuMont Television Network
- List of surviving DuMont Television Network broadcasts
- 1948-49 United States network television schedule

== Bibliography ==
- David Weinstein, The Forgotten Network: DuMont and the Birth of American Television (Philadelphia: Temple University Press, 2004) ISBN 1-59213-245-6
- Alex McNeil, Total Television, Fourth edition (New York: Penguin Books, 1980) ISBN 0-14-024916-8
- Tim Brooks and Earle Marsh, The Complete Directory to Prime Time Network TV Shows, Third edition (New York: Ballantine Books, 1964) ISBN 0-345-31864-1
