= Cartoon Teletales =

American TV series

- Starring: Jack Luchsinger; Chuck Luchsinger
- Country of origin: United States

Production
- Running time: approx. 30 minutes (per episode)

Original release
- Network: ABC
- Release: November 14, 1948 – September 24, 1950

Cartoon Teletales is a television series on ABC from 1948–1950. The show was the first children's series on ABC. It began in May 1948 as a local program in Philadelphia, before moving to New York as a late-afternoon program in June, and expanding to the national network in November.

The show consisted of an original tale told by Jack Luchsinger, illustrated by 10–12 drawings that his brother Chuck Luchsinger did as the story unfolded. Episodes were filmed with a small in-studio audience of children who listened and made suggestions. Musical accompaniment was provided by organist Rosa Rio. Viewers were encouraged to do their own drawings of the story and send them in to compete for prizes and be shown. At the conclusion of each episode, Chuck gave a drawing lesson. Contests drew as many as 5,600 entries a month during 1949.

The story characters included Maurice the Mouse, Melody the Humming Bird, Leon the Lightning Bug, Usta the Rooster, Bamboozle the Ostrich, Mimi the Mole, Bumsniff the Bloodhound, Bigstuff the Elephant, Roscoe the Raccoon, Bungle the Beaver, Dipsy the Dolphin, Pinto the Pony, Cletus the Caterpillar, Alice the Alligator, and a human boy named Hezekiah.

Besides Rio several others involved with the show went on to have notable careers in entertainment.

These include:

- Babette Henry, who was the director, shortly thereafter directed the Buck Rogers TV series
- Ed Nofziger, who was a substitute for Chuck on occasion, went on to be an animator at UPA and Hanna-Barbera plus did magazine gag cartoons and comic book scripts for the Disney Studio program
- Lee Orgel, who was the producer, went on to develop and produce Gay Purr-ee, Mister Magoo's Christmas Carol, The New Three Stooges and Defenders of the Earth

The Luchsinger family own copies of 1 or 2 episodes, and some are held by the UCLA Film and Television Archive.

Two similar shows, Tele-Comics and NBC Comics aired from 1949 to 1951, showing still images of cartoon panels with accompanying voiceover.
