= The Ted Steele Show =

- Starring: Ted Steele
- Country of origin: United States

Production
- Running time: 15 mins. (NBC, CBS); 30 mins. (DuMont)

Original release
- Network: NBC (1948-49); DuMont (1949); CBS (1949-1950)
- Release: September 29, 1948 – July 12, 1949

The Ted Steele Show is the title of several television and radio programs that were hosted by bandleader Ted Steele.

== Television ==
Steele's programs were broadcast on three networks in three consecutive seasons: NBC September 29, 1948 - October 29, 1948; DuMont February 27, 1949 - July 12, 1949; CBS June 6, 1949 - April 28, 1950. The NBC and CBS programs were 15 minutes long, while those on DuMont were 30 minutes.

Other regular performers on the program included Helen Wood, Michael Rich, Nola Day, Marci Bryant and Charles Danford.

Steele later presented local daytime TV shows under the same title, running from 2:30 to 5:30 p.m. ET, on WPIX-TV and WOR-TV, which hired Steele away from WPIX in July 1954. The WPIX program was described in Billboard as "Live talent show, with Steele vocalizing and performing on several instruments, ork [orchestra] numbers, guests, news and sports round-ups, contest gimmicks."

== Episode status ==
The final DuMont episode (July 12, 1949) is in the collection of the UCLA Film and Television Archive.

== Radio ==
The Ted Steele Show was the title of a program Steele had on the Blue Network in 1942. A review in Billboard's January 31, 1942, issue indicated that the 30-minute show featured a singing group and a "playet" by a guest in addition to Steel's performances. He also did the Ted Steele Show on Mutual in the mid-1950s.

In the late 1940s, Steele had a disc jockey program, The Ted Steele Show, on WMCA in New York City. In 1940, he had a program with just his own name as the title, Ted Steele, on WFIL in Philadelphia, Pennsylvania. On that program, Steele played a Novachord synthesizer "as he kept up an entertaining stream of chatter."

== See also ==
- List of programs broadcast by the DuMont Television Network
- List of surviving DuMont Television Network broadcasts
- 1948-49 United States network television schedule

== Bibliography ==
- David Weinstein, The Forgotten Network: DuMont and the Birth of American Television (Philadelphia: Temple University Press, 2004) ISBN 1-59213-245-6
- Alex McNeil, Total Television, Fourth edition (New York: Penguin Books, 1980) ISBN 0-14-024916-8
- Tim Brooks and Earle Marsh, The Complete Directory to Prime Time Network and Cable TV Shows, Ninth edition (New York: Ballantine Books, 2007) ISBN 978-0-345-49773-4
