= Okay, Mother =

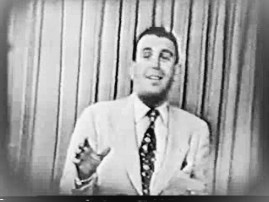
- Screenshot of the show with host Dennis James
- Genre: Game/Variety Show
- Presented by: Dennis James
- Country of origin: United States
- No. of seasons: 3

Production
- Camera setup: Multi-camera
- Running time: 23-24 minutes

Original release
- Network: WABD (1948–1949); DuMont (1949–1951)
- Release: November 1, 1948 – July 6, 1951

Okay, Mother is an American daytime variety/game show which originally aired on WABD in New York City in 1948.

== Broadcast history ==
The series, hosted by Dennis James, began on WABD. On December 12, 1949, it went on the DuMont Television Network weekdays from 1pm to 1:30pm ET. The director was Lou Sposa.

After receiving good ratings and largely positive reviews the show, originally titled Mothers Inc., aired nationally from 1 pm to 1:30 pm ET on the DuMont from early 1949 to July 6, 1951.

== Premise ==
The show was a "tribute to mothers" featuring a mix of interviews, game show segments, sketch comedy, and viewer letters. Recurring games included the "Mother-Grams," a series of poems that alluded to a historical or fictional character that the mother had to guess in order to win a small prize, and "Rhyme Games," in which James would canvass the audience, get a mother to start a sentence, and James would have to finish it with a rhyme or else give the mother a prize (in the lone surviving episode, James complains that the same difficult-to-rhyme "trick words" would often come up day after day, which he would often reject if caught).

The series was an early example of demographics and dayparting: as daytime television audiences were expected to be mostly stay-at-home mothers, DuMont commissioned the series specifically to target that audience. The series was sponsored by Bayer, who advertised Phillips' Milk of Magnesia Toothpaste, Double Danderine dandruff shampoo, and Bayer Aspirin on the existing 1950 episode. James often addressed the TV audience as "Mother", a practice he had begun when discussing the finer points of wrestling during his sports broadcasts. By addressing the TV audience this way, James avoided insulting male sports fans at home or elsewhere about their knowledge of sports.

== Episode status ==
One DuMont episode, recorded on kinescope and with a slightly damaged audio track, survives: the July 18, 1950 episode (dated based on contemporary mentions in The New York Times) with "honor mother" Judith Doniger Lipsey (1912–2007) mentioning her upcoming New York City recital on October 12. The episode in question likely came from Dennis James' personal collection, which held samples of several of the shows he hosted.

Clips of this episode were shown during Pioneers of Television: Game Shows (2008), the last episode of the PBS miniseries' first season. As no copyright was registered or renewed on the kinescope, it is available on the Internet Archive and numerous other places.

== See also ==
- List of programs broadcast by the DuMont Television Network
- List of surviving DuMont Television Network broadcasts
- 1948-1949 United States network television schedule (weekday)
- 1949-1950 United States network television schedule (weekday)

== Bibliography ==
- David Weinstein, The Forgotten Network: DuMont and the Birth of American Television (Philadelphia: Temple University Press, 2004) ISBN 1-59213-245-6
- Alex McNeil, Total Television, Fourth edition (New York: Penguin Books, 1980) ISBN 0-14-024916-8
- Tim Brooks and Earle Marsh, The Complete Directory to Prime Time Network and Cable TV Shows 1946–Present, Ninth edition (New York: Ballantine Books, 2007) ISBN 978-0-345-49773-4
