= Amanda (TV program) =

- Starring: Amanda Randolph
- Country of origin: United States

Production
- Running time: 15 minutes

Original release
- Network: DuMont Television Network
- Release: November 1, 1948 – 1949

Amanda is an American music television program starring Amanda Randolph that debuted on the DuMont Television Network on November 1, 1948. The ending date for the show is unclear, but it still appears in a TV schedule from October 1949.

== Broadcast history ==
Aired in New York City at 9:45 am ET on the DuMont Television Network's flagship station WABD (some sources say the show aired noon to 12;15 pm ET). The show was a 15-minute daytime music program starring Amanda Randolph, who hosted the program and sang.

The program is significant as one of the first regularly scheduled television show to feature an African-American woman as host. On the program, Randolph sang songs ranging from spirituals to boogie woogie. According to the book The Forgotten Network (2004), DuMont began offering 4.5 hours of morning and afternoon programming to affiliates in January 1949, but it is not clear which program these included. The program and several other WABD daytime shows seem to appear in Pittsburgh television schedules (on station WDTV) during 1949, so the program may have been shown on a network level.

According to the April 30, 1949, edition of newspaper Pittsburgh Courier, the program also featured guest appearances, the first of which was Etta Moten.

== Reception ==
The program aired as part of the DuMont experiment in daytime television. While not the first with daytime programming, DuMont's WABD was the first station to offer a schedule that started in the morning and ended after the evening programs; prior to this, daytime programming was occasional with schedules heavy on test patterns.

Billboard magazine gave a very mixed review of the line-up, but Amanda was one of several program on the schedule they liked, with the magazine saying that the songs were "well-sung" and that "the gal is by far the most entertaining part of the early stretch".

== Preservation status ==
As with most DuMont programs, no episodes are known to exist. Kinescopes of daytime television of the 1940s are exceptionally rare, as are kinescopes of local programming (since kinescopes were intended for time-delay purposes, all U.S. stations saw little need to record local programming, and this would remain the case for years).

Although DuMont's main stations very occasionally made kinescopes of their local programming (there are more surviving WABD local kinescopes from the late-1940s/1950s than there are for many other stations of the period), most of the local programming is lost. DuMont's archives are alleged to have been dumped into the New York City waterway system and have never been recovered.

== See also ==
- List of programs broadcast by the DuMont Television Network
- List of surviving DuMont Television Network broadcasts
- 1948-1949 United States network television schedule (weekday)

== Bibliography ==
- David Weinstein, The Forgotten Network: DuMont and the Birth of American Television (Philadelphia: Temple University Press, 2004) ISBN 1-59213-245-6
- Alex McNeil, Total Television, Fourth edition (New York: Penguin Books, 1980) ISBN 0-14-024916-8
- Tim Brooks and Earle Marsh, The Complete Directory to Prime Time Network TV Shows, Third edition (New York: Ballantine Books, 1964) ISBN 0-345-31864-1
