= Your Television Babysitter =

- Presented by: Pat Meikle; Don Hastings
- Country of origin: United States

Production
- Running time: 30 minutes

Original release
- Network: DuMont
- Release: November 1, 1948

Related
- The Magic Cottage

Your Television Babysitter, also billed as Your TV Babysitter, is a daytime live television children’s series which debuted November 1, 1948, on the DuMont Television Network, and was hosted by Pat Meikle and created by her husband Hal Cooper.

== Broadcast history ==
Your Television Babysitter was hosted by Pat (Mary Patricia) Meikle. In each episode, Meikle would tell a story using her “magic chalkboard”, from which colorful fairy-tale characters would appear, including Maxwell the Mouse. The series was produced by Hal Cooper, Meikle's husband. They married on December 21, 1944, had two children Bethami (b. August 16, 1954) and Pamela. Meikle and Cooper divorced in 1970.

Your Television Babysitter, which aired Monday through Friday 8:30am to 9am ET, led to a spin-off, Meikle and Cooper’s The Magic Cottage, which was aimed at slightly older children, and aired on weekday evenings from 6:30 to 7 pm ET.

According to the book The Forgotten Network, both series were well received at the time. Variety praised Meikle and stated that "her knowing method of not talking down to her moppet audience, is probably the answer to a mother's prayer. She's already being touted as a new TV star..." The Magic Cottage continued on DuMont’s flagship station WABD until 1955. Meikle continued to work at WABD after both series had finished their runs.

== Episode status ==
As with most DuMont series, no episodes are known to exist.

== See also ==
- List of programs broadcast by the DuMont Television Network
- List of surviving DuMont Television Network broadcasts
- 1948–49 United States network television schedule (weekday)
- Playroom, DuMont children's series
- Kids and Company, DuMont children's series hosted by Johnny Olsen
- The Magic Cottage (1949-1951) DuMont series also created by Meikle and Hal Cooper

== Bibliography ==
- David Weinstein, The Forgotten Network: DuMont and the Birth of American Television (Philadelphia: Temple University Press, 2004) ISBN 1-59213-245-6
- Alex McNeil, Total Television, Fourth edition (New York: Penguin Books, 1980) ISBN 0-14-024916-8
- Tim Brooks and Earle Marsh, The Complete Directory to Prime Time Network TV Shows, Third edition (New York: Ballantine Books, 1964) ISBN 0-345-31864-1
