= The Magic Cottage (TV series) =

- Presented by: Pat Meikle; Don Hastings
- Country of origin: United States

Production
- Running time: 30 minutes

Original release
- Network: DuMont
- Release: July 18, 1949 – September 12, 1952

Related
- Your Television Babysitter

The Magic Cottage is an American children's program broadcast on the now-defunct DuMont Television Network from 1949 to 1952.

== Broadcast history ==
The Magic Cottage was hosted by Pat (Mary Patricia) Meikle (pronounced Michael), an artist and actress. In each episode, Meikle would tell a story illustrated by her drawings on a sketch pad propped on an easel, from which fairy tale characters would transform into live characters who acted out the adventures. Among them were the likes of Larry the Leprechaun, Maxwell the Mouse, and Wilmer the Pigeon, and in each episode Pat herself transformed into a princess who became part of the story being told, as the drawings "rippled" into real-time action to the accompaniment of a strum on a harp.

The series was produced by Pat's real-life husband Hal Cooper (February 23, 1923 - April 11, 2014). Pat and Hal married on December 21, 1944, had two children—Bethami (b. August 16, 1954) and Pamela—and divorced in 1970. The Magic Cottage was a spinoff of their Your Television Babysitter which aired in daytime 8:30 to 9 a.m. ET Monday through Friday on DuMont beginning November 1, 1948. However, The Magic Cottage was aimed at slightly older children who had just entered school, and aired on weekday evenings from 6:30 to 7 p.m. ET.

It was a low-tech show, consisting largely of Meikle telling stories while drawing charcoal-stick pictures on a large sketch pad and chatting with visitors such as Oogie The Ogre. The basic set showed the interior of a cozy cottage with a window and a Dutch half-door at the rear, with Pat sitting mid-stage and speaking directly into the camera until the action transformed into the story of the day.

According to the book about DuMont called The Forgotten Network, both series were well received at the time. Variety praised Meikle, stating that "her knowing method of not talking down to her moppet audience, is probably the answer to a mother’s prayer. She's already being touted as a new TV star..." And, The Magic Cottage continued on DuMont's flagship station WABD until 1955. In fact, Meikle continued to work at WABD, after both series had finished their runs.

Other regular cast members included Don Hastings, perhaps best remembered in the main supporting role of the Video Ranger on DuMont's popular series Captain Video; and later as the long-running character of Dr. Bob Hughes on the CBS daytime soap opera As the World Turns. Because it was done in New York City, veteran stage actors were commonplace as cast members. Among them were the likes of Broadway and television veteran Ruth White, a Tony- and Emmy-nominated actress who appeared regularly as the librarian named "Bessie Bookbinder."

== Episode status ==
Although suffering the same fate as so many series of its era—virtually all the episodes are lost, a kinescope of one episode is held at the UCLA Film and Television Archive, with another (dating from December 28, 1950) held by the Paley Center for Media. An additional episode may survive as part of the Peabody Award collection.

== See also ==
- List of programs broadcast by the DuMont Television Network
- List of surviving DuMont Television Network broadcasts
- 1949-50 United States network television schedule
- Playroom, DuMont children's series
- Kids and Company, DuMont children's series hosted by Johnny Olsen
- Happy's Party, DuMont children's series broadcast by WDTV-TV in Pittsburgh
- Your Television Babysitter

== Bibliography ==
- David Weinstein, The Forgotten Network: DuMont and the Birth of American Television (Philadelphia: Temple University Press, 2004) ISBN 1-59213-245-6
- Alex McNeil, Total Television, Fourth edition (New York: Penguin Books, 1980) ISBN 0-14-024916-8
- Tim Brooks and Earle Marsh, The Complete Directory to Prime Time Network TV Shows, Third edition (New York: Ballantine Books, 1964) ISBN 0-345-31864-1
