= Li'l Abner (musical) =

American musical based on comic strip by Al Capp

- 1956 Original Cast Recording
- Music: Gene De Paul
- Lyrics: Johnny Mercer
- Book: Norman Panama; Melvin Frank
- Basis: Al Capp's comic strip Li'l Abner
- Productions: 1956 Broadway

Li'l Abner is a 1956 musical with a book by Norman Panama and Melvin Frank, music by Gene De Paul, and lyrics by Johnny Mercer. Based on the comic strip Li'l Abner by Al Capp, the show is, on the surface, a broad spoof of hillbillies, but it is also a pointed satire on other topics, ranging from American politics and incompetence in the United States federal government to propriety and gender roles.

After several other writers and composers considered musicalizing the comic strip, Al Capp finally made a deal in 1955 with the eventual creators for a musical to be financed by Paramount Pictures, which wanted to follow the stage version with a film musical. The Broadway production opened on November 15, 1956, and ran for a moderately successful 693 performances. The score and Michael Kidd's choreography received critical praise, but some critics felt that the book's adaptation lost the spirit of the comic strip. Kidd and Edie Adams, as Daisy Mae, won Tony Awards, while newcomer Peter Palmer, in the title role, won a Theatre World Award. Paramount released a film version with the same title in 1959, with most of the Broadway cast reprising their roles.

== History ==
A musical version of the popular comic strip Li'l Abner was first planned in 1946, with the book to be written by the comic strip's author, Al Capp. Richard Rodgers and Oscar Hammerstein II were named as potential producers, though reports did not state whether they intended to write the score. However, this version never materialized, and over the next several years, various authors and composers sought to musicalize Li'l Abner, including writers Arnold Horwitt and Josh Logan.

In 1953, Arthur Schwartz and Alan Jay Lerner obtained the rights to the show from Al Capp; the three were to co-produce the show, with Schwartz writing the music and Lerner writing the book and lyrics for an opening during the 1954–55 season. The familiar comic strip characters were to be retained but Li'l Abner and his longtime sweetheart Daisy Mae would not yet be married in the musical. Hollywood star Van Johnson expressed interest in the title role, saying he would dye his hair black to match the comic strip character; he had not appeared on Broadway since the 1940 production of Pal Joey.

The Schwartz–Lerner version also fell through, but by the next year Lerner and composer Burton Lane planned to write the musical. Herman Levin would serve as producer, and rehearsals were scheduled to begin in November 1954. However, later that year, Levin announced a musical version of George Bernard Shaw's Pygmalion, by Lerner and Loewe. Although work was supposed to continue on the Lane–Lerner Li'l Abner, this version never appeared, and My Fair Lady, Lerner and Loewe's adaptation of Pygmalion, opened in 1956, becoming the hit musical of the decade.

In 1955, Norman Panama and Melvin Frank announced a Li'l Abner musical to open on Broadway in 1956, followed by a film of the musical. The music was to be written by Gene de Paul with lyrics by Johnny Mercer. De Paul and Mercer had previously written the score for the popular movie musical, Seven Brides for Seven Brothers. Michael Kidd, who had choreographed Seven Brides for Seven Brothers, was to direct and choreograph Li'l Abner. Al Capp approved the production and was to receive a share of any profits. Paramount Pictures was the sole backer of the musical and also paid $300,000 for its film rights, with Panama and Frank slated to adapt, direct, and produce the film version.

The producers conducted a long search for the actor to play the title role: over 400 actors auditioned for the part, and at one time, Dick Shawn was reported to be their preferred choice. However, the producers eventually chose unknown singer Peter Palmer, who had been serving in an army entertainment unit; Panama and Frank saw him perform on a segment of The Ed Sullivan Show featuring talented American soldiers. Palmer was a trained singer with a music degree from the University of Illinois, where he had also played football; at 6'4" and 228 pounds, Palmer had the right "look" to play Li'l Abner. He was 15 years younger than Van Johnson, who had expressed an interest in the role.

The leading female role, Daisy Mae, was relatively easier to cast. The producers knew that they wanted soprano Edie Adams, who had given a star-making performance as Eileen in the 1953 musical Wonderful Town. Adams, however, had also been offered the lead role in the original production of Candide. Adams asked director George Abbott, who had directed her in Wonderful Town, which show she should choose, and he advised her to take Daisy Mae, which she subsequently did. Coincidentally, Al Capp had been one of the three judges for the "Miss U.S. Television" contest broadcast on the DuMont Television Network in 1950 that first brought Adams national attention.

== Original Broadway Cast ==
- Li'l Abner Yokum - Peter Palmer
- Daisy Mae Scragg - Edie Adams (billed as Edith Adams)
- Stupefyin' Jones - Julie Newmar
- Appassionata Von Climax - Tina Louise
- Marryin' Sam - Stubby Kaye
- Mammy Yokum - Billie Hayes
- Romeo Scragg, also Dr Schleifitz - Marc Breaux
- Moonbeam McSwine - Carmen Álvarez
- Earthquake McGoon - Bern Hoffman
- Lonesome Polecat - Tony Mordente (billed as Anthony Mordente)
- Senator Jack S. Phogbound - Ted Thurston
- Mayor Dogmeat - Oran Osburn
- Available Jones - William Lanteau
- General Bullmoose - Howard St. John
- Pappy Yokum - Joe E. Marks
- Evil Eye Fleagle - Al Nesor
- Hairless Joe - Chad Block
- Alf Scragg - Anthony Saverino
- Clem Scragg - James Hurst
- Dr. Rasmussen T. Finsdale - Stanley Simmonds
- Government Man - Richard Maitland
- Colonel, also Dr. Smithborn - George Reeder
- Dr. Krogmeyer - Ralph Linn
- President, also State Department Man, also 2nd Colonel - Lanier Davis
- Butler - James J Jefferies

== Synopsis ==
=== Act One ===
"It's a Typical Day" as the citizens of Dogpatch, U.S.A. go about their daily activities. As usual, sweet, curvaceous Daisy Mae Scragg is pursuing Li'l Abner Yokum who, despite being a strapping, handsome young man, isn't interested in girls or employment. Abner's domineering, diminutive Mammy sends Daisy Mae to tell Abner to come to the Cornpone Meetin' in the town square. At the fishing hole with his friends, Abner lazily reflects that if he could be anyone in the world, he'd rather be himself ("If I had my Druthers"). Daisy Mae tells the young men about the meeting, and they rush into town. Daisy is frustrated because Abner has failed to take any romantic interest in her ("If I Had My Druthers" (reprise)).

The townspeople assemble for the Cornpone Meetin', where parson Marryin' Sam leads a celebration of Dogpatch's founder, "Jubilation T. Cornpone", a bumbling Confederate general whose leadership was more beneficial to the North than to the South. Senator Fogbound, Dogpatch's U.S. congressman, tells the citizens that Congress has declared Dogpatch the most unnecessary town in the U.S., and so it must be evacuated to be used as a nuclear bomb test site to be overseen by Dr. Finsdale, a government scientist. Everyone is thrilled that Dogpatch has been picked out of the entire U.S. ("Rag Offen the Bush").

But Earthquake McGoon reminds them that if they leave Dogpatch, the annual Sadie Hawkins Day race won't take place: in Dogpatch, the only way anyone can be married is if a young woman catches a boy on Sadie Hawkins Day. Daisy Mae's sleazy unscrupulous relative, Romeo Scragg, gives Earthquake permission to marry Daisy Mae (in exchange for a $1 bribe). The townspeople decide to save Dogpatch and Sadie Hawkins Day by proving there is something necessary in the town. Daisy Mae asks Abner if he will let her catch him on Sadie Hawkins Day and tries to persuade him that he deserves to marry a girl like her, and Abner agrees that she should marry a boy like him ("Namely You"). The townspeople lament that their beloved home has been declared an "Unnecessary Town" as Dr. Finsdale declares all of their attempts to prove their worth were in vain.

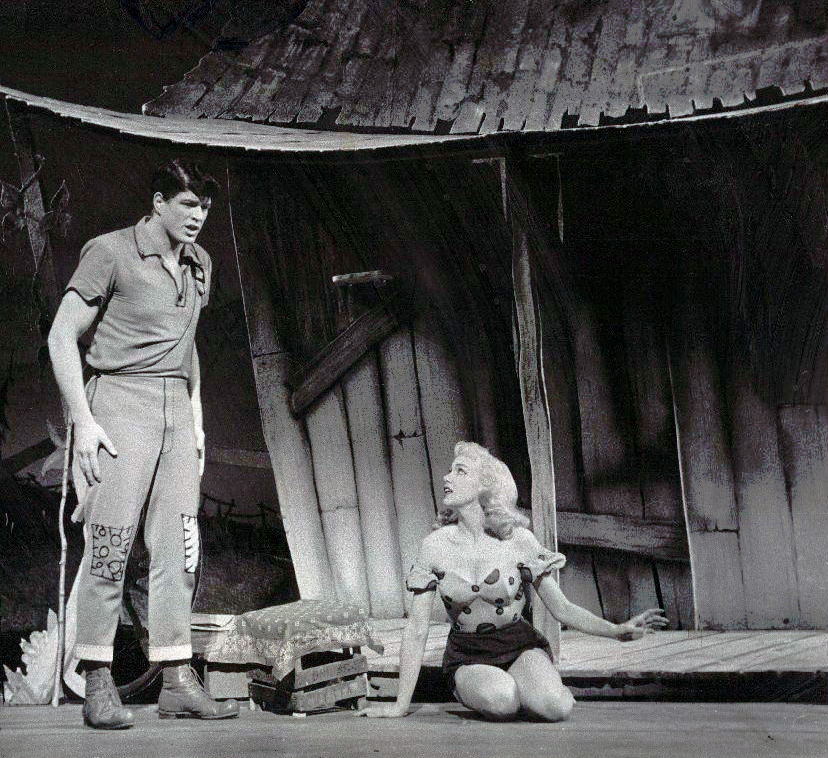
Palmer as Li'l Abner and Adams as Daisy Mae in the original production

It turns out that Mammy Yokum's Yokumberry Tonic, which she makes from the one-of-a-kind Yokumberry tree growing outside her home, is what has made Abner so strong and handsome.

When a short, pudgy government scientist is given a spoonful, he turns into a tall, muscular man. Abner also agrees to go to Washington, accompanied by Marryin' Sam, to allow Dr. Finsdale and the government to test the tonic on the scrawny men of Dogpatch. There, greedy, tyrannical General Bullmoose wants to buy the formula for Yokumberry Tonic, and he is angry that Li'l Abner intends to turn the formula over to the government for free ("What's Good for General Bullmoose"). He hatches a dastardly scheme in which his girlfriend, femme fatale Appassionata Von Climax, will catch Abner on Sadie Hawkins Day. Once they're married, Bullmoose will kill Abner, and the formula will belong to his widow, Appassionata.

Abner and Marryin' Sam return to Dogpatch with the happy news that "The Country's In the Very Best of Hands". On Sadie Hawkins Day, General Bullmoose and Appassionata arrive in Dogpatch. They hire Evil Eye Fleagle to help Appassionata catch Abner. The race begins, and the young women of Dogpatch pursue the young men ("Sadie Hawkins Day" ballet). Though Daisy Mae, with the help of Stupefyin' Jones (any man who looks at her freezes), almost succeeds in catching Abner, Evil Eye Fleagle uses his evil eye to freeze everyone in the race, and Appassionata calmly walks up to Abner and claims him as hers.

=== Act Two ===
In Washington, Dr. Finsdale and the scientists testing Yokumberry Tonic dream of a time when life will be totally controlled by science ("Oh Happy Day"). In Dogpatch, Daisy Mae concludes that the reason she couldn't win Abner is that she, at age seventeen, is too old and no longer beautiful, and Marryin' Sam joins her lament ("I'm Past My Prime"). Mammy Yokum has a vision in which she sees Bullmoose and Appassionata's plot to kill Li'l Abner. Daisy Mae asks Earthquake McGoon to go to Washington, D.C. to save Li'l Abner, promising to marry him if he does.

In Washington, an engagement party is being held for Li'l Abner and Appassionata. General Bullmoose has Evil Eye Fleagle on hand; since Fleagle's evil eye can require him to do anything requested, Appassionata won't even have to marry Abner to get the formula. The General is planning to simply have Fleagle use his eye on Abner, get the formula for Yokumberry Tonic, and then order Abner to commit suicide. Mammy and Pappy Yokum, Earthquake, Daisy Mae, and the ladies of Dogpatch all show up to sabotage the party. When Fleagle tries to use his evil eye on Abner, Earthquake holds up a mirrored serving tray to protect himself, and the beam from Fleagle's eye bounces off the tray and rebounds onto General Bullmoose. Mammy Yokum questions the General, and he reveals the entire plot. The police arrest him and Appassionata.

The women of Dogpatch go to the laboratory to see the results of Yokumberry Tonic. Their scrawny husbands have been transformed into handsome men, but they have no interest in their wives. Dr. Finsdale explains that this is an unfortunate side effect of the tonic: it kills men's romantic interests. The women beg for him to "Put 'Em Back" the way they were before they took the tonic. Daisy tells Abner that she's promised to marry Earthquake since he came to Washington and saved Abner, but she'd rather marry Abner ("Namely You" (reprise)). Softspoken Pappy Yokum tells Abner that he has a secret potion which will make Abner want to marry Daisy Mae. Abner agrees to take it once they get back to Dogpatch.

Back in Dogpatch, Marryin' Sam is officiating at Daisy Mae and Earthquake's wedding. Before the wedding, Daisy introduces her filthy relatives to Earthquake, saying that they'll be coming to live with them once they are married. Marryin' Sam begins the ceremony by warning Earthquake of the potential consequences of marriage ("The Matrimonial Stomp"). Abner and Pappy interrupt the ceremony, and Abner takes the potion (Pappy whispers to Mammy that it's really just water) and declares that he wants to marry Daisy Mae. Earthquake now happily relinquishes Daisy Mae to marry Abner instead. Dr. Finsdale arrives, warning that the atomic bombs will arrive soon. As the townspeople try to move the town's statue of Jubilation T. Cornpone, a plaque bearing a declaration by Abraham Lincoln is revealed: because Cornpone's military blunders almost single-handedly allowed the North to win the Civil War, Dogpatch is designated a national shrine. Dr. Finsdale cancels the bombings, the scrawny men of Dogpatch return home to their happy wives, and the citizens of Dogpatch honor Jubilation T. Cornpone as Abner kisses Daisy Mae (Finale).

== Musical Numbers ==
Act I

- A Typical Day – Dogpatchers
- If I Had My Druthers – Li'l Abner and Cronies
- If I Had My Druthers (Reprise) – Daisy Mae
- Jubilation T. Cornpone – Marryin' Sam and Dogpatchers
- Rag Offen the Bush – Dogpatchers
- Namely You – Daisy Mae and Li'l Abner
- Unnecessary Town – Li'l Abner, Daisy Mae and Dogpatchers
- What's Good for General Bullmoose – Secretaries
- There's Room Enough For Us†
- The Country's in the Very Best of Hands – Li'l Abner and Marryin' Sam
- Sadie Hawkins Day (Ballet) – Dogpatchers

Act II

- Oh Happy Day – Drs. Finsdale, Smithborn, Krogmeyer and Schleifitz
- I'm Past My Prime – Daisy Mae and Marryin' Sam
- Love in a Home – Li'l Abner and Daisy Mae
- Progress Is the Root of All Evil – Bullmoose
- Progress Is the Root of All Evil (Reprise) – Bullmoose
- Put 'Em Back – Wives
- Namely You (Reprise) – Daisy Mae
- The Matrimonial Stomp – Marryin' Sam and Dogpatchers
- Finale – Company

†Added after the show opened

== Productions ==
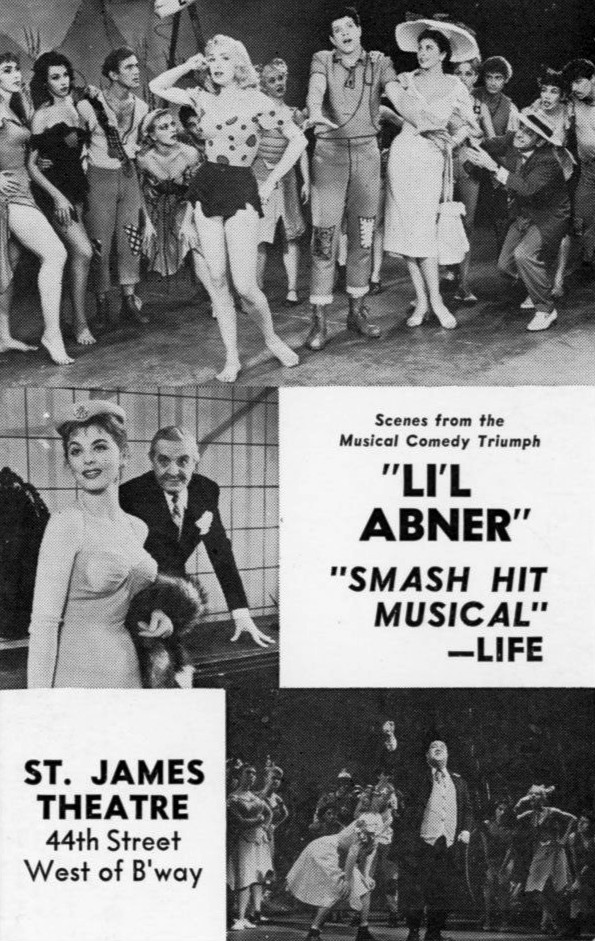
Promotional material for original Broadway production

The Broadway production, directed and choreographed by Michael Kidd and orchestrated by Philip J. Lang, opened on November 15, 1956, at the St. James Theatre where it ran for 693 performances. Alvin Colt designed the costumes, for which he was nominated for a Tony Award for Best Costume Design. The wardrobe is on display at the Costume World Broadway Collection in Pompano Beach, Florida.

In 1998, Li'l Abner was presented in concert as part of the New York City Center's Encores! series.

Goodspeed Musicals in East Haddam, Connecticut, presented the musical from April 21 to July 2, 2006. The production was updated to contemporary times and included references to Martha Stewart, Donald Trump, and Al Sharpton, among others, and the actor who played General Bullmoose was a Dick Cheney (at the time the U.S. vice president) look-alike.

"Reprise! Broadway's Best" produced the musical in Los Angeles in February 2008.

== Film and television ==
A film based on the stage musical was made by Paramount and released in 1959, with most of the Broadway cast reprising their roles. The film was shot to resemble a stage set, with the buildings and surroundings in two-dimensions, giving the sense of a "proscenium dividing audience and performer".

A TV adaptation was produced in 1971 starring Ray Young as Li'l Abner, Nancee Parkinson as Daisy Mae, Billy Bletcher as Pappy Yokum, Donald O'Connor as General Bullmoose and Billie Hayes, reprising her role as Mammy Yokum, which she had played in the 1959 film version.

== Response ==
=== Critical reception ===
1956 Original Broadway Production

The 1956 original Broadway production opened to great praise for Michael Kidd's choreography, and the score was generally well received. However, some critics thought that the creators of the musical had not effectively translated the original comic strip to the stage, and there was some critical disagreement about whether the satirical elements were effective. In the New York Herald Tribune, for example, Walter Kerr praised Kidd's direction and choreography, saying that Kidd "knows how to set fists and feet pounding against the floor. ... Every time he does it the air sizzles and crackles". He also praised the score, stating, "Every time ... the orchestra strikes up for one of Johnny Mercer's and Gene de Paul's salutes to comic-strip fury, the beat is driving, the voices are clamoring. ... It's all done with zip and zingo". John Chapman of the Daily News found Li'l Abner very enjoyable, stating, "I decided I was going to like it all very much soon after the curtain rose and this fetching little Edith Adams sidled up to this big hunk, Peter Palmer, and said, shyly, 'Abner, I brought you some worms.' There is a cast which is as remarkable for its ability to entertain as for its picturesqueness". He praised the satirical lyrics, stating, "Johnny Mercer's lyrics bring to mind the salty and saucy days of Lorenz Hart and Ira Gershwin [as they] jab at our personal and national foibles".

Brooks Atkinson of The New York Times lauded Michael Kidd's choreography, stating, "If everyone in Li'l Abner were as talented as Michael Kidd, everything would be as brilliant as the ballets, and probably the world would be gayer, too. But it is difficult to make a fluent musical romance out of some characters who may have hearts of gold but are not very bright in the upper story". Atkinson thought the book of the musical was inferior to the choreography, stating that the book did "not have the lightness, simplicity, and speed of the Dogpatch folks. ... Mr. Kidd has caught the spirit of Dogpatch civilization brilliantly enough to suggest that ballet is a more suitable medium than words for animating Al Capp's cartoon drawings".

Tom Donnelly of the New York World-Telegram & Sun thought that the production had not retained the spirit of the comic strip, stating, "Those aren't real Dogpatch people stompin' and whompin' and cavortin' across that stage. Those are (sob!) Broadway actors done up in funny looking costumes". He also thought that too much of the libretto was spent explaining the Dogpatch milieu, which Donnelly assumed would be familiar to most audience members since Li'l Abner was at that time a very popular comic strip. Conversely, John McClain of the New York Journal American thought the show would have been incomprehensible to anyone not already familiar with the comic strip. McClain also thought the show's political satire was of "questionable taste", asserting, "it's poor timing to feature a song about 'The Country's in the Very Best of Hands', which attempts to show it isn't, and to haul out and shove all over the stage that dreary caricature of a relentless millionaire". However, McClain still concluded, "it is sure to be a great big hit. Li'l Abner is bountiful, lively, and tuneful".

1998 Encores! Production

In his review of the 1998 Encores! production, Anthony Tommasini of The New York Times praised the production, calling it a "stylish revisiting", saying, "everything we have come to expect of [the Encores! series] is in evidence here: a fresh faced, multitalented cast; imaginative staging from the director, Christopher Ashley; careful attention ... to recreating the original orchestrations; stylish playing from the band, and wonderfully kinetic choreography". However, Tommasini thought the show itself was flawed, pronouncing the book "dated-on-arrival" and saying, "Even in 1956 it must have been hard to find much satirical humor in [the plot]. Today it's downright creepy". He conceded that "the Mercer–De Paul has some tuneful gems" but opined that "Mercer's witty lyrics create a paradox for the actors: characters who sing clever lyrics inevitably sound clever. ... So the score undermines the dimwitted characterizations". Irv Lichtman of Billboard favorably reviewed both the production and the show itself, saying the performance exemplified Encores' "utterly delightful, right-on-the-mark performances". He wrote, "The successful but largely forgotten 1956 musical Li'l Abner is certainly not a dud, for it has good-natured energy and a bright and tuneful score by Gene DePaul and Johnny Mercer ... the show serves well as one of those solid "knockabout" shows Broadway turned out with regularity through the '50s". He praised the "playful zest" of the characterizations and "fine re-creations of the original choreography".

2006 Goodspeed Revival

In The New York Times review of the 2006 Goodspeed production, Anita Gates generally approved of the new topical references added to the show, noting that "Scott Schwartz's colorful new production at the Goodspeed Opera House in East Haddam has updated some of the political references, but the show's message – typified by the gullible Dogpatchers' song "The Country's in the Very Best of Hands" – remains the same". Gates stated that "the musical is cartoonish by definition and hardly one of Broadway's great treasures, but the show grows on you", opining that "most of the Johnny Mercer–Gene de Paul songs are forgettable, but "Namely Me" ... stands out". Frank Rizzo of Variety was more critical of the production, declaring, "even cartoon characters with a diminishing fan base should be shown some respect. This production, helmed with ever-increasing doses of exaggeration by Scott Schwartz, pushes the idiot quotient to new levels and overwhelms the piece's playful political commentary". He praised the show itself, asserting that it contained "many Mercer–de Paul gems in a tuneful, bright score". Rizzo stated that updating Li'l Abner was "not a bad idea, given that there are perennial themes ... that fit into today's social zeitgeist", but he thought that the updates had not been applied consistently, as the show had retained many 1950s references.

=== Awards and nominations ===
1957 Tony Awards

- Tony Award for Best Featured Actress in a Musical - Edith Adams (winner)
- Tony Award for Best Costume Design - Costume Design by Alvin Colt (nominee)
- Tony Award for Best Choreography - Michael Kidd (winner)

Theatre World Awards

- 1957 Theatre World Award - Peter Palmer (winner)
- 1958 Theatre World Award - Wynne Miller (winner)
