= All About Baby =

- Genre: Children
- Starring: Ruth Crowley
- Country of origin: United States
- Original language: English

Production
- Producer: WGN-TV
- Running time: 15 minutes

Original release
- Network: DuMont
- Release: 1953 – July 1955

All About Baby is an American daytime television series offering tips for mothers that aired from October 15, 1954, to July 1955 on several stations of the DuMont Television Network, including flagship station WABD.

== Background ==
All About Baby began as a local weekday program on WBKB-TV, the ABC affiliate in Chicago. When ABC declined to carry the program, the show's sponsor and packager contacted DuMont, which agreed to take it. The program was on the network one day per week and continued locally the other four days. At some point the program was broadcast locally on WNBQ-TV, and on November 22, 1954, it moved to WGN-TV.

Broadcast on Wednesdays, All About Baby was one of five weekly programs that DuMont offered under the umbrella heading Good Living. The others were

- Mondays - Time to Live - It offered advice to "save your labor, plan your leisure".
- Tuesdays - Rooms for Improvement - Pat McAlister helped viewers turn their houses into homes.
- Thursdays - Individually Yours - Celeste Carlyle informed viewers about design and personal appearance and helped them to develop their own style rather than adhere to fashion trends.
- Fridays - Face the Facts - This program offered "beauty hints for 'graceful living'".

== Format ==
The host was Ruth Crowley, a nurse and childcare expert who had been writing an advice column under the name "Ann Landers" since 1943. On the show, she offered advice to new mothers on how to care for their infant children. Crowley died on July 19, 1955. Her last appearance on the show was via kinescope on the July 21, 1955, episode. The series continued with Lorraine Douglas replacing Crowley.

Each year's episode followed a chronological progression, beginning in January with a focus on prenatal care. Subsequent episodes dealt with aspects of childbirth, infancy, toddlers, and pre-school children. The sequence concluded with episodes about children who were ready to start kindergarten. A different child appeared on each episode.

Episodes included "When Baby Sits" and "The Child Who Won't Eat".

== Production ==
Produced by DuMont affiliate WGN-TV in Chicago, the series originally began as a local show in 1953. Sponsors included Swift Meats and Libby's Baby Food. Episodes aired in a 15-minute time-slot, as was often the case with US daytime series of the era. Bernard Miller was the producer for Jules Power Productions. Dick Locke was the director.

== Episode status ==
Although few recordings survive of daytime programs by DuMont stations, three episodes of All About Baby are held by the UCLA Film and Television Archive.

== Critical response ==
Larry Wolters wrote in the Chicago Tribune, "This is the kind of show we feel most young mothers (and fathers, if they could get to see it) would appreciate. It's interesting to watch." He added that pediatricians, in addition to Crowley, often provided advice on the show.

A review in the trade publication Broadcasting praised All About Baby, particularly the manner in which Crowley "explained away the natural but groundless fears every parent has over the newborn child's lack of coordination, spindly arms and bowed legs, crossed eyes and other unattractive characteristics". The review also complimented Crowley's way of integrating commercials into the program, which it said was more effective than typical sales pitches by professional announcers.

== See also ==
- List of programs broadcast by the DuMont Television Network
- List of surviving DuMont Television Network broadcasts
- 1954–55 United States network television schedule (weekday)
- 1954–55 United States network television schedule
- Happy's Party (1952–53, originated from WDTV in Pittsburgh)
- Kids and Company (1951–52)
- The Most Important People (1950–51, sponsored by Gerber's Baby Food)
- Playroom (1948)

== Bibliography ==
- David Weinstein, The Forgotten Network: DuMont and the Birth of American Television (Philadelphia: Temple University Press, 2004) ISBN 1-59213-245-6
- Alex McNeil, Total Television, Fourth edition (New York: Penguin Books, 1980) ISBN 0-14-024916-8
- Tim Brooks and Earle Marsh, The Complete Directory to Prime Time Network TV Shows, Third edition (New York: Ballantine Books, 1964) ISBN 0-345-31864-1
