= The Magic Cottage =

The Magic Cottage may refer to:

- The Magic Cottage (novel), a book written by James Herbert
- The Magic Cottage (TV series), a children's television series broadcast on the DuMont Television Network in the 1940s and 1950s
