= People Are Funny (film) =

1946 film by Sam White

- Directed by: Sam White
- Written by: Dorcas Cochran; John Guedel; David Lang; Maxwell Shane
- Produced by: William H. Pine; William C. Thomas; Sam White
- Starring: Jack Haley; Helen Walker; Rudy Vallee
- Cinematography: Frank Jackman Jr.
- Edited by: Henry Adams
- Music by: Rudy Schrager
- Production company: Pine-Thomas Productions
- Distributed by: Paramount Pictures
- Release date: January 11, 1946
- Running time: 93 minutes
- Country: United States
- Language: English

People Are Funny is a 1946 American musical comedy film directed by Sam White and starring Jack Haley, Helen Walker and Rudy Vallee. It is based on the popular radio show of the same name and was produced by Pine-Thomas Productions for release by Paramount Pictures.

== Plot summary ==
Radio producer John Guedel is panicked and dumbfounded when his popular radio show Humbug is immediately taken off the air for making fun of the legal profession. Given a deadline to produce a replacement, Gudel contacts his writer girlfriend Corey Sullivan to help him but Corey has another client, Leroy Brinker seeking a radio show for himself. The two come across a radio show put on in a small town called People Are Funny that mixes bizarre challenges to contestants with musical entertainment. Corey gets the show's producer Pinky Wilson to bring his show to Mr Guedel.

== Cast ==
- Jack Haley as Pinky Wilson
- Helen Walker as Corey Sullivan
- Rudy Vallee as Ormsby Jamison
- Ozzie Nelson as Leroy Brinker
- Phillip Reed as John Guedel
- Bob Graham as Luke
- Roy Atwell as Mr. Pippensigal
- Barbara Roche as Aimee
- Clara Blandick as Grandma
- Art Linkletter as Master of Ceremonies
- Frances Langford as Frances Langford
- Byron Foulger as Mr. Button (uncredited)

== Production ==
Pine-Thomas bought the screen rights to the radio show in 1944. Jack Haley, who signed a two-picture deal with Pine-Thomas, was assigned to star.

== Soundtrack ==
- Frances Langford with chorus -"I'm in the Mood for Love" (by Jimmy McHugh and Dorothy Fields (lyrics))
- Bob Graham - "Every Hour on the Hour" (by Duke Ellington and Don George)
- Jack Haley with chorus - "Hey Jose" (by Pepe Guízar and Tito Guízar, English lyrics by Jay Livingston and Ray Evans)
- The Vagabonds (in blackface) - "Angelina" (by Allan Roberts and Doris Fisher)
- The Vagabonds - "The Old Squaredance is Back Again" (by Don Reid and Harry Tobias)
- Rudy Vallee with Ozzie Nelson and others - "Alouette" (traditional French Folksong, orchestrated and English lyrics by Rudy Vallee)
- The Vagabonds (in drag)- "Chuck a Luckin'" (by Archie Gottler and Jay Milton and Walter G. Samuels)
- Rosarita Varela - "Celito Lindo"
