= Happy's Party =

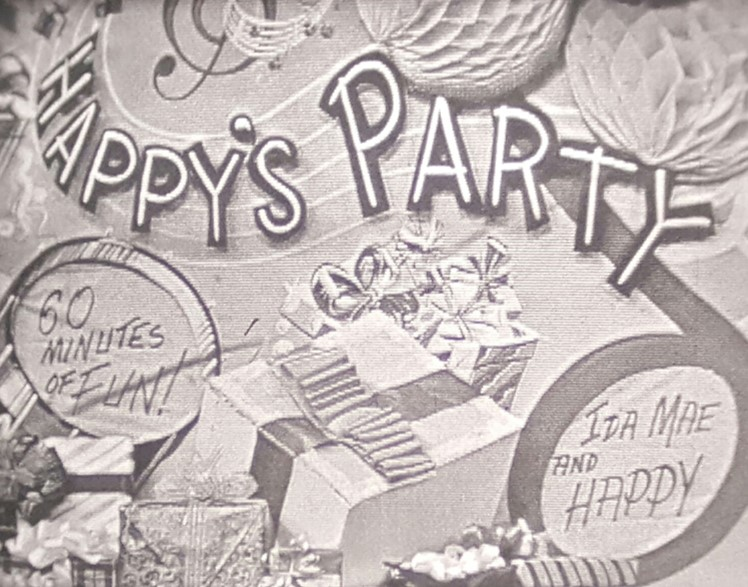
- Opening Title Card
- Presented by: Ida Mae Maher
- Country of origin: United States

Production
- Running time: 30 minutes (network); 60 minutes (local)

Original release
- Network: DuMont
- Release: September 6, 1952 – May 9, 1953

Happy's Party is a children's TV program originating at WDTV in Pittsburgh, Pennsylvania and broadcast for one season on the DuMont Television Network.

The show debuted locally on March 1, 1951, and appears to have had its last telecast on August 13, 1955 (by which time WDTV had been purchased by Westinghouse and became KDKA-TV). It was aired by the DuMont network from September 6, 1952 to May 9, 1953, with a 30 minutes segment on the network and an additional 30 minutes broadcast to the local Pittsburgh market. It also appears to have aired on WQED in Pittsburgh in 1959. Happy was a dog puppet which interacted with host Ida Mae Maher, who also made public-service appearances at elementary school classrooms in the Pittsburgh area. She used a puppet named, "Happy Tooth", to encourage young children to practice good dental hygiene.

== Series premise ==
Ida Mae Maher, the chief dental hygienist for the Pittsburgh Board of Education, came up with the idea of a using a puppet dog on a television series to teach children the importance of good dental health in an entertaining way. The puppet Happy was a "champion of good health, good manners, and good citizenship". In addition to Maher's interaction with Happy there was a panel of four children who answered questioned asked by adult visitors, and playlets written by viewers were presented.

== Episode status ==
No episodes were believed to have survived. In 2015, however, Clarke Ingram, creator of the DuMont historical website, announced he had located a partial show. This fragment, which aired on February 5, 1955 (just six days after WDTV changed to KDKA-TV), is the only known existing footage of the program. In 2019, this footage was digitized and uploaded to YouTube. The original film now resides at the UCLA Film and Television Archive.

== See also ==
- List of programs broadcast by the DuMont Television Network
- List of surviving DuMont Television Network broadcasts
- List of local children's television series
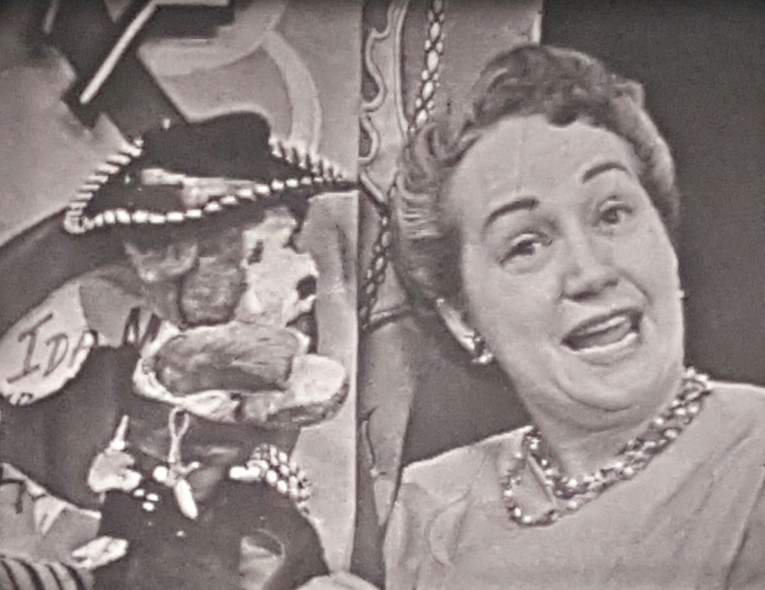
  Ida Mae and Happy
- All About Baby (1953–55), originating from WGN-TV in Chicago
- Kids and Company (1951–52)
- The Most Important People (1950–51), sponsored by Gerber's Baby Food

== Bibliography ==
- David Weinstein, The Forgotten Network: DuMont and the Birth of American Television (Philadelphia: Temple University Press, 2004) ISBN 1-59213-245-6
- Alex McNeil, Total Television, Fourth edition (New York: Penguin Books, 1980) ISBN 0-14-024916-8
- Tim Brooks and Earle Marsh, The Complete Directory to Prime Time Network TV Shows, Third edition (New York: Ballantine Books, 1964) ISBN 0-345-31864-1
