= The Ruff and Reddy Show =

American animated television series

- Also known as: Ruff and Reddy
- Genre: Comedy
- Created by: William Hanna; Joseph Barbera
- Written by: Joseph Barbera; Charles Shows
- Directed by: William Hanna; Joseph Barbera; Bob Hultgren (NBC sequences)
- Presented by: Jimmy Blaine (original run); Robert Cottle (reruns)
- Voices of: Daws Butler; Don Messick
- Narrated by: Don Messick
- Theme music composer: Hoyt Curtin
- Opening theme: "Here Comes Ruff and Reddy"
- Composer: Hoyt Curtin
- Country of origin: United States
- No. of seasons: 3
- No. of episodes: 156 (list of episodes)

Production
- Producers: William Hanna; Joseph Barbera
- Running time: 4 minutes
- Production company: H-B Enterprises

Original release
- Network: NBC
- Release: December 14, 1957 – April 2, 1960

The Ruff and Reddy Show (also known as Ruff and Reddy) is an American animated television series created by William Hanna and Joseph Barbera for NBC. It has been referred to as the earliest original color Saturday-morning cartoon, following Mighty Mouse Playhouse, which was made up of theatrical shorts. This was the first series made by H-B Enterprises, later known as Hanna-Barbera. The series follows the adventures of Ruff (a smart and steadfast cat) and Reddy (a good-natured and brave but not overly bright dog). It was presented by Screen Gems, the television arm of Columbia Pictures. It premiered in December 1957 and ran for 156 episodes until April 1960, comprising three seasons total. It was repeated on NBC Saturday mornings from 1962 to 1963. In the late 1950s, it was sponsored by Post Consumer Brands.

Hanna and Barbera created The Ruff and Reddy Show for their newly founded animation studio, then named H-B Enterprises. The buddy film genre had previously been explored in their Tom and Jerry theatrical shorts, but unlike Tom and Jerry's signature rivalry, Ruff and Reddy have an amicable relationship. The series is notable as one of the earliest original animated television programs as well as a pioneer of the use of limited animation techniques for television, paving the way for Hanna-Barbera's future productions.

== History ==
=== Background ===
In 1957, the animation producer-director team of William Hanna and Joseph Barbera were terminated from an 18-year tenure at Metro-Goldwyn-Mayer producing the animated Tom and Jerry and Droopy theatrical short subjects. Their staff - composed of 110 animators, inkers, painters, and other artists - were also let go, as MGM found it more profitable to continually re-release older cartoons than to produce new ones. Hanna and Barbera remained a partnership and invested $30,000 out of pocket into a new venture, H-B Enterprises.

The duo began work on storyboards featuring new characters, the first among them being Ruff (a cat) and Reddy (a dog). Hanna later equated their respective names with he and his partner's dispositions at the period in which they were created. They forged a deal with former MGM colleague George Sidney in which he received a minority stake in the new company in return for acting as a business representative. Sidney arranged for a meeting at Screen Gems, which had at the time been considering re-entering the animation business. Feeling confidence in the Ruff and Reddy characters, the duo presented their proposal, along with a streamlined production budget, employing limited animation.

=== Animation ===
Back at MGM our budget was lavish enough to allow as many as sixteen drawings per foot of fully animated film. It was a new ballgame for TV. In order to meet our budget for Ruff and Reddy, we had to pare the drawings down to no more than one or two per foot of film.

— William Hanna on the show's use of limited animation

Ruff and Reddy, as one of the first original animated series produced for television, pioneered the technique of limited animation. Limited animation would require far fewer drawings, and, by extension, less inking and painting. This method was employed by necessity, as higher budgets had been the cause for the collapse of the theatrical cartoon business. Hanna, in a six-page memo, had attempted to convince his superiors at MGM to employ economized techniques in order to reduce the cost of their short films, but received no response. At that time, he had estimated a six-minute cartoon to cost $17,500 if it employed the limited animation technique (down from the $35,000 budget the duo received at MGM). When pitching to Screen Gems, Hanna had worked down the numbers to a much smaller $3,000, and the duo were very confident the company would respond with great excitement. Screen Gems appreciated the show concept, but explained to the duo that the budget for television, still an experimental medium, would be very stringent. Eventually, the company gave the partnership an option to produce five five-minute segments, with an escalating budget starting from $2,700.

Hanna described the process in his 1996 memoir, A Cast of Friends: "It was essential that we select only the key poses necessary to convincingly impart the illusion of movement in our cartoons." This method often emphasizes close-ups, rather than full or medium shots. All in all, the production process for Ruff and Reddy was not dissimilar from the process used to create theatrical cartoons: a script was written, followed by a storyboard illustrating key poses. Afterwards, a recorded soundtrack with dialogue was used to create a "pose reel," which would give the filmmakers a sense of timing. Watching pose reels during their MGM years had emphasized that simple key poses would be enough to demonstrate humor. Hanna believed the process to be in line with the nature of television during the period, stressing "intimacy rather than spectacle,". It thus represented an entirely different viewing experience, a large movie screen versus a small, standard-dimension television screen.

In addition to the quicker, cheaper production process, Hanna and Barbera made the decision to produce the segments in full color. "It was one of the smartest things we did," Hanna said. "We said, 'Color will be here soon. Cartoons last forever. Let's go ahead and do them in color, and we'll be a jump ahead of the game.'" This strategy paid off, as Hanna-Barbera's following series continued to be reran after color television increased its prevalence in the late 1960s. Ruff and Reddy also eschewed lavish, detailed background art for simple, colorful illustrations.

=== Writing and music ===
Hanna and Barbera were fond of the "ongoing comedic rapport" of cartoon duos, among them the Wile E. Coyote and the Road Runner and Sylvester the Cat/Tweety rivalries of Warner Bros. Cartoons. Their own creation at MGM, Tom and Jerry, had been a variation on this theme. With Ruff and Reddy, they decided to delete the nemesis theme and make the characters best friends instead. "Consequently, this softer relationship placed a greater emphasis on the humor and wit conveyed to the audience through dialogue," wrote Hanna.

Hanna wrote the series' theme music, in his first foray into theme music composition, which would become a staple of Hanna-Barbera for nearly 30 years. His goal to capture the spirit of the characters while also catching the listeners' ear, he penned the lyrics one morning while storyboarding, handing off the sheet music to musical director Hoyt Curtin, who composed the melody. Unlike Tom and Jerry, the two new characters would speak, and the duo held auditions to find voice artists. Mainly selecting those they worked with at MGM, Hanna and Barbera decided to cast Don Messick as Ruff and Daws Butler as Reddy. Messick and Butler became the main long-time voice actors of H&B cartoons.

The series was set to be the opening and closing acts for a half-hour children's program airing on Saturday mornings. While they had screened the pilot episode prior to broadcast, Hanna later admitted he was nervous as to how the public would respond. He writes in his book that reviews in trade papers were mainly positive, deeming it an "entertaining and clever cartoon program." NBC, following this success, signed the duo to a five-year contract to produce and develop additional animated television series.

NBC paired the opening and closing episodes of the show (usually with a cliffhanger) with live segments and classic cartoons from the prior incarnation of Screen Gems, including The Fox and the Crow and Li'l Abner.

== Plot ==
The series follows the adventures of the titular duo Ruff the cat and Reddy the dog. Unlike other Hanna-Barbera productions, every season is divided into four lengthy "story arcs", where the titular duo engage in lengthy confrontations with adversaries.

== Episodes ==
Season	Episodes	Originally released	
Season	Episodes	First released	Last released
1	52	December 14, 1957	June 7, 1958
2	52	December 13, 1958	April 4, 1959
3	52	December 19, 1959	April 2, 1960

== Voice cast ==
- Don Messick as Ruff, Narrator, Professor Gizmo, Salt Water Daffy, Diller, Wooly, Ubble-ubble, Various
- Daws Butler as Reddy, Pinky, Scary Harry Safari, Captain Greedy, Killer, Various

== Other appearances ==
- In 1972, the duo appeared on Yogi's Ark Lark, a TV movie part of The ABC Saturday Superstar Movie (which featured almost every Hanna-Barbera animal character that existed at the time).
- In 1987, Ruff made his first solo appearance as a newspaper vendor in the season three episode of Yogi's Treasure Hunt, "Goodbye Mr. Chump".
- In 2017, the pair appeared in the comic book Green Lantern/Space Ghost Annual #1, where they are portrayed as 1950s stand-up comedians turned TV stars, and in a six-issue miniseries adaptation of The Ruff and Reddy Show.
- In the Wacky Races episode "The Wacky Always Races Twice", Professor Gizmo appears as one of Professor Bella's thugs and henchmen.
- Ruff and Reddy appear in the HBO Max original series Jellystone! with Ruff voiced by Oscar Reyez and Reddy voiced by Jakari Fraser. They appear as robotic children and are also shown to be brothers. Reddy lacks his Southern accent, however.

== Merchandise ==
A video game, Ruff and Reddy in the Space Adventure, was released in 1990 for the Amstrad CPC, ZX Spectrum, Commodore 64, Amiga, Atari 8-bit computers, and Atari ST.

== Lawsuit ==
According to Mark Kausler, sometime during the show's airing, Hanna and Barbera's former co-worker at MGM, Rudolf Ising, sued the duo for the names Ruff and Reddy due to his involvement in conceptualizing two characters with the same name during their time at MGM.

== Home media ==
Episodes of the series appeared on the Animal Follies volume released on October 20, 1988, on VHS and 1989 on LaserDisc (as part of the Hanna-Barbera Personal Favorites home video series) along with Yippee, Yappee and Yahooey, Touché Turtle and Dum Dum, Augie Doggie and Doggie Daddy and Snagglepuss. Warner Bros. Home Entertainment never released the series on home media; the first episode of the show, "Planet Pirates", was listed on the press release for The Best of Warner Bros.: Hanna-Barbera 25 Cartoon Collection DVD set to be released on May 21, 2013; however, due to an inaccuracy in that press announcement, the episode is among several that were not on the actual set.

== See also ==
- List of works produced by Hanna-Barbera Productions
- List of Hanna-Barbera characters
