= People Are Funny =

US radio and television game show (1942–1960)

- Sam Berman's caricature of Art Linkletter for NBC's 1947 promotional book.
- Presented by: Art Baker (1942–43); Art Linkletter (1943–60); Flip Wilson (1984)

Production
- Executive producer: John Guedel
- Running time: 30 minutes

Original release
- Network: NBC; CBS (Radio, 1951–54)
- Release: April 10, 1942 – April 13, 1961
- Release: March 24 – July 21, 1984

People Are Funny is an American radio and television game show, created by John Guedel that ran from 1942 to 1960 in which contestants were asked to carry out stunts in order to prove that "People Are Funny." Many stunts lasted weeks, months, or even years; but those who were successful received prizes. People Are Funny rarely had celebrities, focusing instead on everyday people. As a result, few recordings of the show were saved.

== Radio ==
The series began in 1938 when Guedel made an audition recording, and the following year, his concept of a comedy stunt show aired in Los Angeles as Pull Over, Neighbor, later reworked into All Aboard. Watching a bored, unreceptive audience listening to an after-dinner speaker, Guedel scribbled, "People are funny, aren't they?" on a napkin, and he had his title.

In 1942, learning of a show that was canceled, he pitched People Are Funny to NBC, and it went on the air April 10, 1942, with Art Baker as host. In a popular first-season stunt, a man was assigned to register a trained seal at the Knickerbocker Hotel while explaining that the seal was his girlfriend.

On October 1, 1943, Baker was replaced by Art Linkletter, who continued for the rest of the series. For a memorable stunt of 1945, Linkletter announced that $1,000 would go to the first person to find one of 12 plastic balls floating off California. Two years later, an Ennylageban Island native claimed the prize.

As the popularity of the program escalated, a film musical titled People Are Funny was released in 1946, offering a fictional version of the show's origin in a tale of rival radio producers. Phillip Reed appeared as Guedel, with Linkletter and Frances Langford portraying themselves. Also in the cast were Jack Haley, Helen Walker, Ozzie Nelson and Rudy Vallée. One outstanding moment in the film is a Spanish dance number performed by Lupe Mayorga (aka Lillian Molieri) to the song "I Love My Marimba." The radio series moved to CBS from 1951 to 1954, returning to NBC from 1954 to 1960.

== Television ==
Linkletter continued as host of the show during its run on television from September 19, 1954, to April 1, 1960. In one stunt, a contestant would win a prize if he could sustain a phone conversation with a puzzled stranger (picked at random from the phone directory) for several minutes without the other party hanging up. The series received Emmy nominations in 1955 and 1956. It finished #27 in the Nielsen ratings for the 1955–1956 season, then finished #21 for 1956–1957 and #29 for 1957–1958.

Although the series ended on April 1, 1960, the network aired encores until April 13, 1961, making People Are Funny the first game show to air repeats. On March 24, 1984, a "reconstituted" version of People Are Funny with Flip Wilson as host returned to NBC where it was telecast until July 21.

== U.S. television ratings ==
Season	Episodes	Start date	End date	Nielsen rank	Nielsen rating
1983–84		March 24, 1984	July 24, 1984	62	14.0

== Cultural legacy ==
- Derek Roy was the host of a 1955 British version.
- The series was satirized in the 1959 Warner Bros. cartoon, People Are Bunny. The Art Linkletter character was named Art Lamplighter, and the show was titled People Are Phony, in which contestant Daffy Duck became one of his unfortunate victims; his goal was to help an elderly lady across the street.
- People Are Funny is mentioned in the "Ladies Room" episode of the series Mad Men, and later a clip from the show is seen on a TV set in the background.
- People Are Funny is referenced in a cameo by Art Linkletter in the 1960s series Batman (episode 2.49, "Catwoman Goes to College"). The Dynamic Duo are rope-climbing the side of a building when Art Linkletter (as himself) opens a window and briefly converses with them.
