= Hal Cooper (director) =

American director, producer and actor (1923–2014)

- Born: Harold Cooper; February 23, 1923; The Bronx, New York, U.S.
- Died: April 11, 2014 (aged 91); Beverly Hills, California, U.S.
- Education: University of Michigan
- Occupations: Television director, executive producer
- Spouse(s): Pat Meikle (1944-1970); Martha Salcido (1971-2010)
- Children: 1

Harold "Hal" Cooper (February 23, 1923 – April 11, 2014) was an American television director and executive producer who worked primarily on sitcoms. After establishing himself as a pioneer of the Golden Age of Television, Cooper became a regular director on many of the popular and enduring shows of the 1960s, 1970s and 1980s.

Cooper directed 54 episodes of I Dream of Jeannie between 1966 and 1969 and 126 of the 141 episodes of Maude, where he also served as executive producer from 1975 through 1978. His work on the latter series earned him two Emmy Award nominations as well as three nominations from the Directors Guild of America Awards.

== Early life ==
Born in The Bronx, New York, on February 23, 1923, Cooper began his entertainment career at the age of 9, becoming part of the acting troupe on the children's radio show Rainbow House. When he wasn't on microphone, Cooper spent his time in the control room, learning about directing from the show's producer and director, Bob Emery. One day in 1936, Emery fell ill two hours before the show was to go live and he chose Cooper to fill in for him, resulting in Cooper directing his first live broadcast at the age of 13.

Cooper began attending the University of Michigan, but his education was interrupted by World War II. After serving in the United States Navy for three years, he returned to the university and completed his degree. While he was at the university he was heard in original dramas on WUOM radio. He graduated in 1946.

== Career ==
In 1947 Cooper worked at the Dock Street Theatre in Charleston, South Carolina, as a director and an actor.

Beginning on November 1, 1948, Cooper wrote, produced and acted in the pioneering live daytime children's series Your Television Babysitter for the DuMont Network. This show, which was co-written and hosted by Cooper's wife, Pat Meikle, aired on DuMont's first full day television broadcasting and led to a spin-off, The Magic Cottage, which Cooper also produced.

From 1950 to 1957, Cooper directed and produced a number of daytime soap operas, including Search for Tomorrow. He moved to Los Angeles, California in 1958, where he produced and directed the soap opera For Better or Worse during 1959-1960. He broke into network television sitcoms in 1962, starting with two episodes of The Dick Van Dyke Show. Over the next three decades, he amassed an extensive number of directing credits, which, in addition to I Dream of Jeannie and Maude, included 38 episodes of Mayberry R.F.D., 23 episodes of That Girl, 27 episodes of The Courtship of Eddie's Father, 11 episodes of The Odd Couple, 8 episodes of The Brady Bunch, 81 episodes of Gimme a Break!, 19 episodes of Empty Nest and 67 episodes of Dear John. He was also an executive producer on the latter three series.

== Personal life ==
Cooper married Pat Meikle in 1944, the year she graduated from the University of Michigan. They had a daughter.

=== TV movies and pilots ===
- Bobby Jo and the Good Time Band (1972 CBS pilot)
- Jerry (1974 CBS pilot)
- One Day at a Time (1975 CBS pilot)
- The Rear Guard (1976 ABC pilot)
- Freeman (1976 ABC pilot)
- McNamara's Band (1977 ABC pilot)
- King of the Road (1978 pilot)
- Snavely (1978 ABC pilot)
- Did You Hear About Josh and Kelly? (1980 pilot)
- Mr. and Mrs. and Mr. (1980 TV movie)
- And They Lived Happily Ever After (1981 CBS pilot)
- Million Dollar Infield (1982 TV movie)
- The Astronauts (1982 CBS pilot)
- A Fine Romance (1983 CBS pilot)
- Never Again (1984 NBC pilot)
- The Stiller and Meara Show (1986 pilot)
- Starting Now (1989 CBS pilot)

== Later years and death ==
Cooper retired in 1996; his final screen credit as director was a January 1997 episode of Something So Right. He died of heart failure at his home in Beverly Hills on April 11, 2014. He was 91.
