= Jimmy Blaine =

American radio and television performer, producer, and writer (1924–1967)

Jimmy Blaine (born James William Bunn; December 26, 1924 - March 18, 1967) was an American radio and television performer, producer, and writer.

== Early years ==
Blaine was born James William Bunn on December 26, 1924, in Greenville, Texas. The son of Mr. and Mrs. Ellis B. Bunn, he had three brothers and three sisters. He began singing when he was 3 years old. At age 7 he had an act, The Three Brats, which performed in clubs until he was 12. When he was 13 years old he sang two songs on the Pepper Upper program on the Dr. Pepper-Dixie Network. By that time orchestra leader Paul Whiteman had predicted that he would do well as an entertainer. He attended Southwest High School and, for one year, Creighton University. He went on to study three years at the Conservatory of Music of Kansas City.

== Military service ==
Beginning in 1942, Blaine was a B-17 pilot with the Eighth Air Force during World War II. After being in combat missions in that role he was appointed commanding officer of the Paris station of the Armed Forces Radio Service. He had three weekly 30-minute radio shows on that station. While there he and Madeleine Carroll appeared in shows for the French Red Cross, and he headlined some programs in nightclubs. In 1946, after he was discharged he became a member of the Army Air Force Active Reserve, flying out of Mitchel Field.

== Career ==
In the early 1940s Blaine was the master of ceremonies at the Tower Theater in Kansas City, and he sometimes sang as part of the show. A newspaper review in 1942 said that he provided "smooth continuity to affairs" and had a "pleasant voice".

=== Radio ===
Before Blaine joined the military he sang on WOW in Omaha and was an announcer at times on WDAF in Kansas City. He worked on several programs on KCMO in Kansas City, and during that time he began using Jimmy Blaine as his professional name at the request of a program's sponsor. In 1947 he won a talent contest on the NBC program Big Break, which enabled him to go to New York. In one day he had two auditions at ABC, one for singing and one for announcing. He was hired as an announcer.

Blaine worked as a singer on radio station WNEW in New York City, and he was the "'sweet' vocalist" on The Buddy Weed Show on ABC Radio. He was featured as a singer on Tomorrow's Tops. He was one of the hosts on Ladies Be Seated and the announcer on Criminal Casebook, Superstition, The Lanny Ross Show and Get Rich Quick.

On June 4, 1950, he began the Jimmy Blaine Show, a 15-minute weekly program, on the WJZ network.

=== TV ===
Blaine sang on Stop the Music and was the announcer on Cavalcade of Stars and The Paul Winchell and Jerry Mahoney Show. He portrayed Jersey Jim on Howdy Doody and acted on Hollywood Screen Test. He was the host of The Dunninger Show, Jimmy Blaine's Junior Edition, The Billy Daniels Show, Music from Cedar Grove (also known as Music from Meadowbrook), Ruff and Ready and Talk of the Town, and he was the singing master of ceremonies on Hold That Camera.

=== Other commercial ventures ===
Blaine was one of two hosts heard on the Grand Award record album Children of Paris, released in 1962. The album featured two versions of each of its songs, first sung in French by French children and then sung in English by American children. He introduced the latter versions. A review in the trade publication Billboard called the album "Worth hearing for its own sake, and a dandy aid to language teachers." A booklet that accompanied the album contained music and lyrics in both languages for the songs. In 1967 he completed a recorded adaptation of the Curious George book.

Blaine was head of the Jimbo Productions company, and he wrote the special programs Let's Keep Christmas (1965) and Sing out for Uncle Sam (1966) for ABC Radio.

=== Religious work ===
In the early 1960s Blaine decided to pursue religious activities professionally. His work in the Junior High Department in Larchmont Avenue Church's Sunday School was one cause of that decision. He felt that entering the ministry would prepare him to produce religiously oriented programs for radio and TV. He commended the programs that already existed in that genre, but he said that more were needed. He took courses at Columbia University, majoring in religion, to complete work on an undergraduate degree. He planned to study at Union Theological Seminary as preparation for being ordained. Rather than taking him into a different career, such preparation would prepare him for a different emphasis in his broadcasting career. He wrote 90-second versions of Bible stories for broadcast on radio beginning in late 1961 or early 1962. They were heard on the Flair program on ABC Radio. He graduated from Columbia with bachelor's and master's degrees in English and comparative literature.

== Personal life and death ==
Blaine married Phyllis Fish on September 28, 1948, in New York. They had a son and two daughters. He died of a heart attack in Wilton, Connecticut, on March 18, 1967, aged 42.
