= Steve Randall =

- Also known as: Hollywood Off Beat
- Starring: Melvyn Douglas; Mary Beth Hughes; Will Jordan
- Country of origin: United States
- No. of episodes: 13

Production
- Producers: Marion Parsonnet; Lester Lewis
- Running time: 30 minutes

Original release
- Network: DuMont (Feb 1952-Jan 1953); CBS (June-Aug 1953)
- Release: 1952 – 1953

Steve Randall (also known as Hollywood Off-Beat) is an American detective television series starring Melvyn Douglas. The series' 13 episodes were initially seen in syndication during the summer of 1952, before being picked up and rerun by the DuMont Television Network from November 7, 1952, to January 30, 1953. CBS subsequently ran 9 of the same 13 episodes again from June 16, 1953, to August 11, 1953.

== Background and premise ==
The series' concept originated from stories written by Louis Blatz, an attorney. The initial TV adaptation was A Hollywood Affair, starring Lee J. Cobb and Adele Jergens. The pilot for that series did not sell, but the producers tried the same concept again with Steve Randall.

Steve Randall is a disbarred attorney who became a private detective in an effort to be reinstated as a lawyer. He handled cases such as blackmail and murder before he was reinstated in the series's final episode.

== Cast and production ==
In addition to Douglas, the program featured Mary Beth Hughes.

Some episodes of the program were broadcast on local stations as Hollywood Off Beat before it began its network run. The episodes on DuMont were broadcast on Fridays from 8 to 8:30 p.m. Eastern Time.

United Television Programs distributed the show. Marion Parsonnet was the producer and director. Sponsors included Swank men's jewelry and Dixie Cups.

== Episode status ==
The series' final episode, "The Trial" (September 11, 1952), is available for viewing on the Internet Archive. Four episodes (June 12, July 3, August 14, and September 11, 1952) are in the J. Fred MacDonald collection at the Library of Congress.

== Critical response ==
Critic Jack Gould wrote in The New York Times in 1953 that a repeat of an episode was "just as familiar and just as tired" as it had been previously, with "the usual quota of murders, an oomphy siren and tough guys talking out of the side of the mouth."

A capsule review in the trade publication Billboard said that Douglas "is adept at lending importance where little or none is due." As a result, it added, the series "often rises above its material."

Syndicated critic John Crosby wrote, "As adventure whodunits go, this is a pretty good one."

== See also ==
- List of programs broadcast by the DuMont Television Network
- List of surviving DuMont Television Network broadcasts

== Bibliography ==
- David Weinstein, The Forgotten Network: DuMont and the Birth of American Television (Philadelphia: Temple University Press, 2004) ISBN 1-59213-245-6
