= For Better or Worse (1959 TV series) =

1950s American soap opera

- Genre: Soap opera
- Created by: John Guedel
- Screenplay by: Franklin Barton
- Directed by: Hal Cooper
- Starring: Jim Bannon; Dr. James A. Peterson
- Country of origin: United States
- No. of seasons: 1
- No. of episodes: 268

Production
- Producer: Hal Cooper
- Production location: CBS Television City
- Running time: 30 minutes

Original release
- Network: CBS
- Release: June 29, 1959 – June 24, 1960

For Better or Worse is an American soap opera that aired on CBS from June 29, 1959, to June 24, 1960. The show was atypical for its genre in that episodes were grouped into distinct storylines or "cases", each following a different fictional couple, with the cast changing along with the storyline. The only permanent cast members were the narrator Dr. James A. Peterson and the series host Jim Bannon.

== Premise ==
The show was promoted as "Video Marriage Counselling" rather than as a traditional soap opera. The storylines were fictionalized accounts from the case files of Dr. Peterson, a clergyman and associate professor of sociology at USC, who trained graduate students to become professional marriage counselors. Storylines ran from 15 to 25 episodes in length. Each episode would open with a brief introduction by host Jim Bannon, followed by the dramatic performance. At the end of each episode, Bannon would ask questions of Dr. Peterson on camera to draw out his observations.

== Response ==
Reviewers were not impressed with the veneer of professionalism provided by Dr. Peterson's analysis at the end of each episode. For one critic For Better or Worse was "pseudo-scientific soap opera" and "pap by any name". Another felt the stories might better have been presented as pure fiction, as the writing for each episode seemed forced, in order to illustrate a specific point by Peterson. This same reviewer, after watching the entire first storyline, felt it "was staged, acted, and written with competence", but was too repetitive. Columnist Harriet Van Horne was more scathing: "Every point was made three times and then reviewed for the hard of hearing."

== Production ==
The show was created by executive producer John Guedel. He had used Dr. Peterson on another TV program, Art Linkletter's House Party, where he proved popular with home audiences. The show's sponsors were Scott Paper and Lever Brothers. Hal Cooper served as both producer and director. The teleplays were written by Franklyn Barton.

Made at a studio in CBS Television City, the actors' performances and the analysis by Dr. Peterson were recorded on Quadruplex videotape a week in advance of the actual broadcast. When a writer's strike was threatened in spring 1960, CBS revealed it was three weeks ahead on For Better or Worse scripts.

== Broadcast history ==
For Better or Worse replaced Jimmy Dean Show starting June 29, 1959. It was slotted at 2:00 pm on CBS' daytime schedule, directly following As the World Turns and right before Art Linkletter's House Party. Network affiliated stations would generally follow that schedule, with the usual one hour offset in the Central time zone and two hours in the Mountain time zone. However, as the show was taped with no live broadcast offered, many stations chose to run it at different times. Such tinkering with daytime schedules was more common than with primetime, where national sponsors had greater say in programming.

For Better or Worse was pre-empted twice, for hour-long afternoon CBS specials titled Woman!. Otherwise it appeared five days a week, even on holidays, thanks to advance videotaping. It was allowed to finish out its first season but wasn't picked up for another. Its last broadcast was on Friday, June 24, 1960; it was replaced on the CBS schedule by Full Circle the following Monday.

=== Storylines ===
No. overall	No. in season	Title	Directed by	Written by	Episodes	Original release date
1	1	"The Case of the Childish Bride"	Hal Cooper	Franklin Barton	16	June 29, 1959
Spoiled young bride marries man on a whim. Cast: Dyan Cannon (Jane), Ronald Foster (Russell), Frank Albertson (Jane's Father), Grace Albertson (Jane's Mother)
2	2	TBA	Hal Cooper	Franklin Barton	TBA	July 21, 1959
Can marriage be run on a time clock basis? Cast:
3	3	TBA	Hal Cooper	Franklin Barton	TBA	TBA
Cast:
4	4	TBA	Hal Cooper	Franklin Barton	TBA	TBA
Cast:
5	5	TBA	Hal Cooper	Franklin Barton	TBA	TBA
Cast:
6	6	TBA	Hal Cooper	Franklin Barton	TBA	TBA
Cast:
7	7	TBA	Hal Cooper	Franklin Barton	TBA	TBA
Cast:
8	8	TBA	Hal Cooper	Franklin Barton	TBA	TBA
Cast:
9	9	TBA	Hal Cooper	Franklin Barton	TBA	TBA
Cast:
10	10	"The Case of Don and Louise"	Hal Cooper	Franklin Barton	25	March 1, 1960
Executive uses dirty tactics to meet ambitions of well-heeled wife Cast: Patricia Huston (Louise)
11	11	TBA	Hal Cooper	Franklin Barton	TBA	April 5, 1960
Cast:
12	12	TBA	Hal Cooper	Franklin Barton	TBA	TBA
Cast:
13	13	"The Case of Mike and Linda"	Hal Cooper	Franklin Barton	15	June 6, 1960
Husband alienates wife by postponing their having a child Cast:
