= The Billy Daniels Show =

American TV variety series (1952)

The Billy Daniels Show is an American television variety series that was broadcast on the American Broadcasting Company (ABC) from October 5, 1952, to December 28, 1952. It was the first TV series featuring a Black entertainer that was fully sponsored on a national network. Another TV series with the same name was broadcast in the Los Angeles area in 1959.

== Overview ==
The program featured songs by Billy Daniels, accompanied by the Benny Payne Trio. Jimmy Blaine was the host. It was broadcast on Sundays from 6:30 to 6:45 p.m. Eastern Time. Songs performed on the program included "Honeysuckle Rose", "The Thrill Is Gone", "Sunny Side of the Street", and "There'll Be Some Changes Made".

Fred Heider was the producer and writer. Alex Segal was the initial director; when he left ABC, Charles Dubin replaced him. Blaine delivered commercials for Rybutol. The show originated from WJZ-TV in New York. Vitamin Corporation of America (manufacturer of Rybutol), ended the series after the December 28, 1952, episode. It was replaced by Lash of the West.

== Critical response ==
The trade publication Billboard called The Billy Daniels Show "... one of those programs which you just can't visualize failing to make it big". The magazine's review called Daniels "a dynamic performer" and pointed out "a highly effective" duet that he performed with Payne.

John Lester wrote in the Staten Island Advance that Daniels's performance on the program had an "intense, vigorous, exciting oldtime [sic] style". Lester complimented Daniels's personality and the show's emphasis on music with a limited amount of talk.

== 1959 program ==
Another version of The Billy Daniels Show debuted in the Los Angeles area on KTLA-TV on January 13, 1959. Daniels sang and interviewed guests in a setting that resembled a nightclub. Payne played piano, and a studio orchestra provided additional music.
