= John Guedel =

American television producer

- Born: October 9, 1913; Portland, Indiana, U.S.
- Died: December 14, 2001 (aged 88); Los Angeles, California, U.S.
- Occupations: Radio and television producer
- Known for: You Bet Your Life; People Are Funny; House Party; The Adventures of Ozzie and Harriet
- Spouse(s): Beth Pingree; Helen Parrish; Valerie McDonald
- Children: 2

John Guedel (October 9, 1913 – December 14, 2001) was an American radio and television producer who co-created and produced Art Linkletter's and Groucho Marx's most important and successful broadcast properties, including You Bet Your Life, House Party and People Are Funny. He also created The Adventures of Ozzie and Harriet and is sometimes credited with the first singing radio commercial in 1937. He was a producer for The Charlotte Greenwood Show on radio.

Earlier in his career, he wrote for Hal Roach Studios, including work on the Laurel and Hardy and Our Gang series. In the 1946 film People Are Funny, Guedel was portrayed by actor Phillip Reed.

One of his less successful creations was a daytime soap opera, For Better or Worse, for which he also served as executive producer. It preceded his House Party show during 1959–1960 but lasted only one season.

== Personal life ==
In 1957–1959 he was married to actress Helen Parrish.
