= Sense and Nonsense =

- Presented by: Bob Kennedy
- Country of origin: United States

Production
- Running time: 30 minutes

Original release
- Network: DuMont (WABD)
- Release: 1951 – 1954

Sense and Nonsense is an American game show hosted by Bob Kennedy which ran on New York City TV station WABD from 1951 to 1954. The show consisted of two three-child teams using their five senses to complete challenges and earn money, with the high-scoring team returning on the next show.

Sponsored by Coca-Cola (specifically "Coke in-a-bottle"), and with a somewhat-unorthodox Monday-Wednesday-Friday airing schedule, Sense has since gained something of a "cult following" among fans of early television. While only shown on WABD, it is often considered a DuMont Television Network program due to not only being on the network's flagship affiliate, but having several production "quirks" typical of many DuMont programs.

== Gallery ==
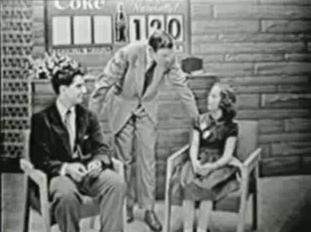
Kennedy with the team captains (the display showing $120 denotes the returning champions).

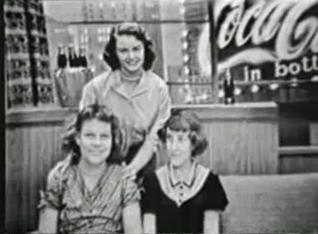
The hostess introducing the other two members of the returning team.

== Episode status ==
Only one episode is known to exist, from February 19, 1954 (one commercial mentions the upcoming weekend and celebrating George Washington's birthday with Coke in-a-bottle, showing a boy and girl doing so in Colonial attire and powdered wigs). Among other things, the episode is notable for a young Leonard Frey playing on the challenging team.

This episode is held by the UCLA Film and Television Archive, but can be purchased on DVD through various public-domain retailers and is available for viewing on the Internet Archive.

== See also ==
- List of programs broadcast by the DuMont Television Network
- List of surviving DuMont Television Network broadcasts
