= Hold That Camera =

- Presented by: Jimmy Blaine (game format); Kyle MacDonnell (variety format)
- Country of origin: United States

Production
- Running time: 30 Minutes

Original release
- Network: DuMont
- Release: August 27 – December 15, 1950

Hold That Camera is an American game show that ran on the DuMont Television Network's primetime schedule from August 27 to December 15, 1950. It was initially broadcast on Sundays from 7:30 to 8 p.m. Eastern Time. In September 1950 it was moved to Fridays from 8:30 to 9 p.m. E. T.

Originally a game show hosted by Jimmy Blaine (1924-1967), after the first few episodes the format was completely overhauled into a variety show with Kyle MacDonnell as host. The orchestra leader was Ving Merlin.

== Production ==
Ted Kneeland was the producer for West Hooker Productions Corporation in association with Emil Mogul. The director was Raymond E. Nelson. The writers were Kneeland and Myron Mahler. The sponsor was Esquire Boot Polish.

== Episode status ==
Two episodes are known to exist: October 20, held by the J. Fred MacDonald collection at the Library of Congress and December 1, held by the Paley Center for Media.

== See also ==
- List of programs broadcast by the DuMont Television Network
- List of surviving DuMont Television Network broadcasts
- 1950-51 United States network television schedule
