= Robert Cottle =

American television host

Robert S. Cottle
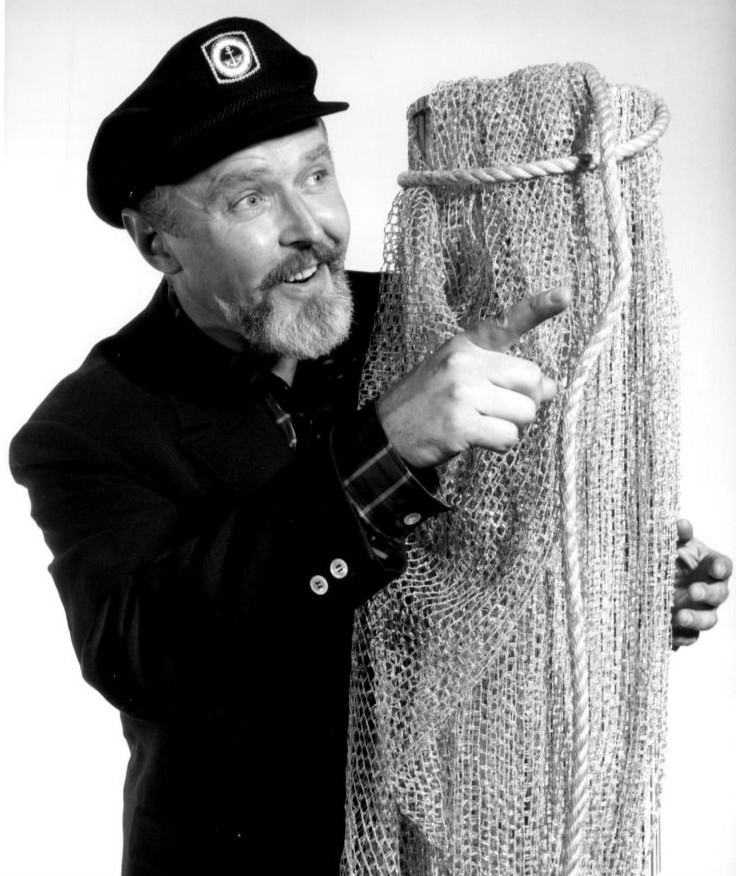
- Cottle as "Captain Bob" in 1962.
- Born: August 7, 1920; Brockton, Massachusetts, U.S.
- Died: April 25, 1999 (aged 78); San Mateo, California, U.S.
- Occupation: Television host
- Spouse(s): Bette Volpe; 1 child Beth (Willis) Johnson

Robert S. Cottle (August 7, 1920 – April 25, 1999) was an American television host.

== Early life ==
Robert Cottle was the son of Earle W. and Gladys E. (Pierce) Cottle. He grew up and attended local schools in Brockton, Massachusetts. During World War II, Cottle was a B-17 Flying Fortress flight instructor for the USAF at Lackland AFB.

== Television career ==
In the 1950s, Cottle began a career in television as a host for children's TV shows, often appearing as "Captain Bob." One of his first shows, The Nature World of Captain Bob began in Hartford, Connecticut, it was a thirty-minute Saturday morning art instruction program offering sketching techniques for wildlife subjects and set in a sea shanty. Later, in 1953, the show moved to Boston, Massachusetts, where it ran for another 14 years.

In addition to hosting his own TV shows in the Boston area, Cottle took over as host for the NBC TV show The Ruff & Reddy Show in September 1962. The show ran for two more years, at times beating CBS-TV's Captain Kangaroo in the Nielsen ratings. Cottle appeared for the last time on national TV in the 1963 Macy's Thanksgiving Day Parade, which aired on NBC and CBS.

From 1976 to 1982, The Nature World of Captain Bob aired Saturday mornings on WCVB (Channel 5) and was re-run for several years afterward well into the early 1990s. Many episodes of the show were recently unearthed and archived at the Northeast Historic Film Archive of Captain Bob.

== Later life ==
In the late 1960s, Cottle and a friend, Robert Bourque, created the Prophetron Zoltan Fortune Teller machine, to which Cottle lent his voice. He continued to host local TV shows in Boston and in Hartford, Connecticut, including the show The Magic Window, on WBZ-TV.

== Personal life ==
Cottle had a son, Robert S. Cottle, Jr. with his first wife, the former Bette Volpe, a native of Medford, Massachusetts. In 1987, Bette Cottle died, and Cottle remarried to his high school sweetheart, Beth Willis Johnson. They moved to Block Island, Rhode Island, and, in 1997, to San Mateo, California, where Cottle died in 1999 from a stroke, aged 78. Robert and his wife Bette lived in Norwell for many years in the 1960s to 1980s. He also had a pet crow.
