= List of The Ruff and Reddy Show episodes =

This is a list of episodes for the animated series, The Ruff and Reddy Show.

Each season consists of four story arcs, each of which is divided into thirteen segments. Two Ruff and Reddy shorts were shown in each episode alongside pre-existing Screen Gems shorts and live-action host segments.

== Series overview ==
Season	Episodes	Originally released	
Season	Episodes	First released	Last released
1	52	December 14, 1957	June 7, 1958
2	52	December 13, 1958	April 4, 1959
3	52	December 19, 1959	April 2, 1960

== Episodes ==
=== Season 1 (1957–58) ===
No. overall	No. in season	Title	Original release date
1	1.01	"Planet Pirates"	December 14, 1957
Ruff and Reddy are abducted by some space creatures in a UFO.
2	1.02	"Night Flight Fright"	December 14, 1957
On board the flying saucer, Ruff and Reddy avoid the space creatures and commandeer the control room.
3	1.03	"The 'Whama Bama Gamma' Gun"	December 21, 1957
Reddy gets hold of the space creatures' gun and ejects them into space but are approaching a planet.
4	1.04	"The Mastermind of Muni-Mula"	December 21, 1957
On planet Muni-Mula, Ruff and Reddy are taken to the Mastermind who wants them duplicated as robots. The Mastermind has a spherical metal head with two faces, one with the voice and personality of Phil Silvers's Sgt. Bilko, the other domineering.
5	1.05	"The Mad Monster of Muni-Mula"	December 28, 1957
Reddy tries to stop the mass production of robots but gets brainwashed by a machine.
6	1.06	"Hocus Pocus Focus"	December 28, 1957
As Ruff tries to rescue Reddy, the Mastermind orders Reddy to capture him.
7	1.07	"Muni-Mula Mix-Up"	January 4, 1958
Reddy's brainwash wears off. The Hocus Pocus Focus takes Ruff and Reddy to the Mastermind.
8	1.08	"The Creepy Creature Feature"	January 4, 1958
The Mastermind turns out to be Dr. Gizmo imprisoned by the mechanical brain, so Reddy destroys it.
9	1.09	"The Creepy Creature"	January 11, 1958
Ruff, Reddy and Dr. Gizmo are chased by the Creepy Creature until Reddy deals with it.
10	1.10	"Surprise in the Skies"	January 11, 1958
With the Muni-Mula army on their tail, Ruff and Dr. Gizmo escape the planet without Reddy.
11	1.11	"Crowds in the Clouds"	January 18, 1958
As Dr. Gizmo and Ruff go back to help Reddy and cover their advance, Reddy gets hold of a flying helmet.
12	1.12	"Reddy's Rocket Rescue"	January 18, 1958
Dr. Gizmo rescues Reddy and blows up the Muni-Mula force.
13	1.13	"Rocket Ranger Danger"	January 25, 1958
Dr. Gizmo's ship is hit by a mammoth meteor and the ship crash lands on a mountain back on Earth.
14	2.01	"Pinky the Pint Sized Pachyderm"	January 25, 1958
A baby elephant escapes from a circus and requests Ruff and Reddy to take him home in Africa.
15	2.02	"Last Trip of a Ghost Ship"	February 1, 1958
Ruff, Reddy and Pinky board the Voo Doo Queen ghost ship. After meeting a parrot, the ship is in motion.
16	2.03	"The Irate Pirate"	February 1, 1958
Captain Crossbones Jones forces Ruff, Reddy and Pinky to be his crew, but they start to escape.
17	2.04	"Dynamite Fright"	February 8, 1958
Ruff, Reddy and Pinky get stranded at sea trying to escape and then they start to sink.
18	2.05	"Marooned in Typhoon Lagoon"	February 8, 1958
Ruff, Reddy and Pinky cruise to an island. Ruff gets captured whilst exploring.
19	2.06	"Scarey Harry Safari"	February 15, 1958
A hunter named Harry Scary uses Ruff as bait to lure a lion, but the lion and Ruff take off.
20	2.07	"Jungle Jitters"	February 15, 1958
Ruff rescues the lion and Harry Scary reveals himself as an elephant hunter.
21	2.08	"Bungle in the Jungle"	February 22, 1958
Before Harry Scary can shoot Reddy, the lion comes to his rescue and all three run for it.
22	2.09	"Miles of Crocodiles"	February 22, 1958
Harry Scary pursues Ruff, Reddy and Pinky. Then Pinky and Ruff are surrounded by crocodiles.
23	2.10	"A Creep in the Deep"	March 1, 1958
Reddy gets trapped with the crocodiles after saving Ruff and Pinky and Harry Scary comes round.
24	2.11	"Hot Shot's Plot"	March 1, 1958
Ruff and Reddy follow Harry Scary who took Pinky away. Harry Scary makes Pinky lure his mother into a trap.
25	2.12	"The Gloom of Doom"	March 8, 1958
Harry Scary gets all Ruff, Reddy, the lion, Pinky and his mother exactly where he wants.
26	2.13	"The Trapped Trap the Trapper"	March 8, 1958
The tables turn because of Harry Scary's empty rifle. Ruff and Reddy stowaway back home.
27	3.01	"Westward Ho Ho Ho"	March 15, 1958
Ruff and Reddy win a trailer and a free vacation to the wild west, but enter the ghost town of Gruesome Gulch.
28	3.02	"Slight Fright on a Moonlight Night"	March 15, 1958
A couple of mobsters drive Ruff and Reddy out of Gruesome Gulch into the desert.
29	3.03	"Asleep While a Creep Steals Sheep"	March 22, 1958
Ruff and Reddy are met by Woolly sheepdog. Reddy dresses as a sheep to catch some rustlers.
30	3.04	"Copped by a Copter"	March 22, 1958
Reddy is taken away by helicopter driving rustlers to their hideout in Gruesome Gulch.
31	3.05	"The Two Terrible Twins from Texas"	March 29, 1958
Reddy is discovered and captured by the Texan Twins, Killer and Diller.
32	3.06	"Killer and Diller in a Chiller of a Thriller"	March 29, 1958
The Texan twins dump Reddy in a speeding railway mine cart.
33	3.07	"A Friend to the End"	April 5, 1958
Ruff and Woolly rescue Reddy and proceed to find the sheep back in Gruesome Gulch.
34	3.08	"Heels on Wheels"	April 5, 1958
As Ruff, Reddy and Woolly pursue the Texan Twins, they get flat tires and take the helicopter for transport.
35	3.09	"The Whirly-Bird Catches the Worms"	April 12, 1958
Ruff, Reddy and Woolly fly after the Texan Twins in their helicopter.
36	3.10	"The Boss of Double-Cross"	April 12, 1958
Ruff, Reddy and Woolly lose sight of the Texan Twins, but the stolen sheep summon the helicopter.
37	3.11	"Ship-Shape Sheep"	April 19, 1958
The sheep save Ruff, Reddy and Woolly from a nasty fall, and the Texas Twins capture Reddy and Woolly.
38	3.12	"Rootin' Tootin' Shootin'"	April 19, 1958
After Killer catches Ruff, Reddy is challenged to duel him.
39	3.13	"Hot Lead for a Hot-Head"	April 26, 1958
Using a trick, Ruff and Reddy defeat the Texas Twins. Ruff and Reddy then conclude their vacation.
40	4.01	"The Treasure of Doubloon Lagoon"	April 26, 1958
Ruff and Reddy visit an aquarium and a seal follows them out to their house.
41	4.02	"Blunder Down Under"	May 3, 1958
Ruff and Reddy pursue the seal for reward money. Then they retrieve a submarine from the sea bed.
42	4.03	"The Metal Monster Mystery"	May 3, 1958
Ruff and Reddy are met by Dr. Gizmo, who seeks treasure located in the Blue Lagoon.
43	4.04	"The Late, Late Pieces of Eight"	May 10, 1958
Ruff, Reddy and Dr. Gizmo dive for the treasure, whilst an enemy submarine lingers.
44	4.05	"The Goon of Doubloon Lagoon"	May 10, 1958
The enemy sub catches Dr. Gizmo's sub and takes Ruff, Reddy and Dr. Gizmo to a secret grotto.
45	4.06	"Two Dubs in a Sub"	May 17, 1958
Captain Greedy and Saltwater Daffy imprison Ruff, Reddy and Dr. Gizmo. Then the seal arrives to help them.
46	4.07	"Big Deal with a Small Seal"	May 17, 1958
The seal releases Ruff, Reddy and Dr. Gizmo from their cell and takes care of Greedy and Saltwater.
47	4.08	"A Real Keen Submarine"	May 24, 1958
Greedy and Saltwater surround Ruff, Reddy, Dr. Gizmo and the seal, but the slippery seal makes a distraction.
48	4.09	"No Hope for a Dope on a Periscope"	May 24, 1958
The seal saves Reddy from drowning but Saltwater catches him.
49	4.10	"Rescue in the Deep Blue"	May 31, 1958
The seal and Reddy manage to get away from Saltwater but are tailed by a shark.
50	4.11	"A Whale of a Tale of a Tail of a Whale"	May 31, 1958
Reddy and the seal lose the shark as they ride on a whale. When they get close to Doubloon Lagoon, Greedy fires.
51	4.12	"Welcome Guest in a Treasure Chest"	June 7, 1958
The seal boards Dr. Gizmo's sub with Ruff inside it and prepares a surprise for Greedy.
52	4.13	"Pot-Shot Puts Hot Shot on a Hot Spot"	June 7, 1958
Saltwater and Greedy have the ship with gold but all that weight sinks the ship. Ruff, Reddy, Dr. Gizmo and the seal then head home.

=== Season 2 (1958–59) ===
No. overall	No. in season	Title	Original release date
53	1.01	"Egg Yeggs"	December 13, 1958
Ruff and Reddy help Dr. Gizmo to protect his valuable Chickasaurus egg from some thieves.
54	1.02	"The Dummy Mummy"	December 13, 1958
Killer and Diller in mummy guises swipe the Chickasaurus egg, wrapping Ruff and Reddy in their mummy wrappings.
55	1.03	"The Chicken-Hearted Chickasaurus Chase"	December 20, 1958
Gizmo, Ruff and Reddy pursue Killer and Diller, but the Chickosaurus egg tumbles out of their truck and towards our heroes.
56	1.04	"The Chickasaurus Crack-Up"	December 20, 1958
The Chickasaurus falls down a cliff and cracks. When Ruff, Reddy and Dr. Gizmo reach the egg, it begins to hatch.
57	1.05	"The Slick Chickasaurus Chick Trick"	December 20, 1958
The Chickasaurus has only managed to partially hatch from the egg. When it does hatch Killer and Diller arrive.
58	1.06	"The Chicken-Hearted Chickasaurus"	December 27, 1958
As Killer and Diller try to take the Chickasaurus away, but Ruff, Reddy and Dr. Gizmo get tangled with the running Chickasaurus.
59	1.07	"Chickasaurus Choo Choo!"	December 27, 1958
As the Chickasaurus becomes airborne, Killer and Diller follow by helicopter all the way to a secret prehistoric jungle.
60	1.08	"Rumble in the Jungle"	December 27, 1958
After a Brontosaurus blows Killer and Diller away, Ruff and Reddy try to flee from the jungle but they run towards a T-Rex.
61	1.09	"The Sorehead Tyrannosaurus"	January 3, 1959
Ruff, Reddy and Dr. Gizmo take shelter in a cave from a T-Rex. In the darkness they see a pair of eyes.
62	1.10	"Two Eyes Spy on the Guys"	January 3, 1959
Ruff, Reddy and Dr. Gizmo are met by a cave boy called Ubble-Ubble, who knocks out the T-Rex. Killer and Diller kidnap Ubble-Ubble.
63	1.11	"Double-Trouble with Ubble-Ubble"	January 3, 1959
Ubble-Ubble bats Killer and Diller but they recapture him and Ruff, Reddy and Dr. Gizmo are confronted by a sabre-toothed tiger.
64	1.12	"A Chick in Need Is a Chick Indeed"	January 3, 1959
Ubble-Ubble lands in the chickasaurus nest where the chickasaurus is nursing a pair of eggs.
65	1.13	"A Quick Trick Saves A Slick Chick"	January 10, 1959
Killer and Diller try to steal the chickasaurus eggs but are flattened by Reddy. Ubble-Ubble joins the team back home (where Gizmo has presumably adopted him) and becomes a little league baseball sensation.
66	2.01	"Scary Tale on a Canyon Trail"	January 10, 1959
At the Grand Canyon, Ruff and Reddy hear of rumors of a pint-sized pony and as to the validity of their existence. Harry Scary hears of the rumors as well.
67	2.02	"Borrowed Burro in a Burrow"	January 10, 1959
Harry Scary sends Reddy on his out-of-control donkey Poco Loco, who disappears in a burrow.
68	2.03	"Pint-Size Surprise for the Guys"	January 17, 1959
Ruff and Reddy make their way through the burrow where they see Poco Loco has made friends with a pony no bigger than Reddy's hand.
69	2.04	"Reddy and Me and Pee-Wee Make Three"	January 17, 1959
Harry Scary tracks the Pee-Wee Pony's hoofprints, and Pee-Wee leads Harry on a chase.
70	2.05	"Hoss Thief Grief"	January 17, 1959
Harry lassos Pee-Wee but the pint-sized pony refuses to give up.
71	2.06	"Tricked and Trapped by a Tricky Trapper"	January 24, 1959
Pee-Wee escapes Harry's clutches and hides out in Reddy's hat. Poco Loco gives it to Harry "in the end."
72	2.07	"Harry Safari and the Phoney Pony"	January 24, 1959
Harry Scary tries to hold our heroes at gunpoint in exchange for Pee-Wee, but Poco Loco steals Harry's gun. As Pee-Wee heads back home, Harry lies in wait for him.
73	2.08	"Frantic Antics of Poco Loco"	January 24, 1959
Harry Scary captures Pee-Wee in a sack. Pee-Wee's mother runs to alert Poco Loco, Ruff and Reddy.
74	2.09	"Nag in the Bag"	January 31, 1959
Harry Scary escapes with Pee-Wee in a motorboat, pursued closely by Ruff and Reddy.
75	2.10	"Bungled Bundle of Boodle"	January 31, 1959
Harry takes Pee-Wee to his carnival, where he plans to get rich off using the pint-size pony as an attraction.
76	2.11	"Chump's Jumps Bring Bumps and Lumps"	January 31, 1959
As our heroes head for Harry Scary's carnival, Pee-Wee goes through indignities as a performer in Harry's show.
77	2.12	"Show-Biz-Wiz"	February 7, 1959
Pee-Wee is locked in a strongbox as Ruff, Reddy and Poco Loco infiltrate the carnival.
78	2.13	"These Three Set Pee-Wee Free"	February 7, 1959
Disguised as clowns, Ruff and Reddy rescue Pee-Wee, while Poco-Loco sends Scary into orbit with a good donkey kick.
79	3.01	"Fantastic Phantom"	February 7, 1959
Thinking they've subdued a burglar in the house, Ruff and Reddy discover a strange little man.
80	3.02	"Long Gone Leprechaun"	February 14, 1959
The visitor is a leprechaun, who filches Reddy's gold watch. How can he and Ruff explain this to the police?
81	3.03	"The Goon of Glocca Morra"	February 14, 1959
The leprechaun tells our heroes of the Goon of Glocca Morra, a greedy being who has taken their princess for ransom and just keeps all the gold.
82	3.04	"Bungle in Banshee Castle"	February 14, 1959
The leprechaun takes Ruff and Reddy to Ireland where the princess is being held captive at Banshee Castle.
83	3.05	"Afloat in a Moat with No Boat"	February 21, 1959
Reddy's climb to the castle ends in a moat, leaving our heroes to alternate means of entering.
84	3.06	"Too Soon the Goon"	February 21, 1959
Ruff is slingshot into the castle where he goes missing. The leprechaun shrinks Reddy to his size as the pair venture to the castle.
85	3.07	"Smitten by a Kitten"	February 21, 1959
The leprechaun and Reddy go across the moat and into the castle where Reddy is chased by the Goon's cat.
86	3.08	"Mr. Small Meets Mr. Tall in the Hall --- That Is All"	February 21, 1959
Reddy finds Ruff locked in a cell, then has to get by the cat in order to get to the cell key, held by the Goon.
87	3.09	"Going - Going Goon"	February 28, 1959
Reddy sets eyes on the Goon of Glocca Morra as he makes a bid for the cell key.
88	3.10	"A Scary Chase Through a Spooky Place with a Goony-Face"	February 28, 1959
Reddy frees Ruff from his cell and together they flee from the Goon.
89	3.11	"Bing Bang Boom in a Real Small Room"	February 28, 1959
Ruff hides in a turret, and the Goon plans to blast him out with a cannon in which Reddy is hiding.
90	3.12	"Gold Room Doom"	March 7, 1959
Ruff and Reddy search the Goon's treasure room for the princess.
91	3.13	"Three See the Wee Princess Free"	March 7, 1959
Reddy clobbers the Goon with a gold piece and with Ruff discovers the princess had been imprisoned in the Goon's hat. Reddy is returned to normal size while the Goon is shrunk and made a playtoy for his own cat.
92	4.01	"Missile Fizzle"	March 7, 1959
With help from Ruff and Reddy, Professor Gizmo plans to launch a rocket to the Moon. However, things go wrong when Reddy launches it prematurely.
93	4.02	"The Missing Missile Mystery"	March 14, 1959
As the rocket's third stage engages its parachute, it falls to earth and is blown by upper level winds off course.
94	4.03	"Never Land in Never-Never Land"	March 14, 1959
The capsule lands in a frozen diorama. Meanwhile, Captain Greedy and Saltwater Daffy track the capsule, full of valuable instruments, in their submarine.
95	4.04	"Polar Bear Scare"	March 14, 1959
Reddy's ire is aroused when he sees a Viking boy being chased by a polar bear. But the slick ice surface isn't conducive to head-to-head battle.
96	4.05	"A Liking for a Striking Viking"	March 21, 1959
Ruff, Reddy, Gizmo and the Viking child, Olaf, make it to the capsule, but Olaf wants to go back out and fight the bear.
97	4.06	"Bear Hunting Is for the Birds"	March 21, 1959
Olaf summons his pet falcon to ward off the bear, who turns tail and runs away.
98	4.07	"Beep-Beep from the Deep-Deep"	March 21, 1959
While Ruff, Gizmo and Olaf search for food, Captain Greedy and Saltwater Daffy surface.
99	4.08	"Two Fiends in a Submarine"	March 28, 1959
Olaf calls upon his falcon again when Captain Greedy and Saltwater Daffy hold Ruff and Professor Gizmo hostage.
100	4.09	"Muscle Man Meets Missile Man"	March 28, 1959
Captain Greedy forces Gizmo to take him to the capsule, in which Reddy is sound asleep.
101	4.10	"Bull Fight Fright"	March 28, 1959
Olaf launches an offensive on Greedy and Daffy while Olaf's falcon alerts Reddy.
102	4.11	"Reddy Clobbers Robbers"	April 4, 1959
Reddy clobbers Saltwater Daffy, but Greedy, smelling something rotten in Denmark, sends Gizmo in to get clobbered as well.
103	4.12	"Machine Gun Fun"	April 4, 1959
Olaf gets hold of Captain Greedy's gun, and it goes haywire. Once it becomes loose, a battle for it ensues, ending with Greedy holding Reddy at gunpoint.
104	4.13	"Bad Guys Meet Good Guys"	April 4, 1959
Greedy confiscates Gizmo's capsule equipment, but Olaf gets the drop on him with a horde of Vikings.

=== Season 3 (1959–60) ===
No. overall	No. in season	Title	Original release date
105	1.01	"Dizzy Deputies"	December 19, 1959
A swamp pirate, Jean La Fitt, runs amok and spoils Ruff and Reddy's fishing trip.
106	1.02	"Later, Later, Alligator"	December 19, 1959
Deputized by Sheriff Cotton E. Pickens, the boys and Pickens are pursued by an alligator.
107	1.03	"Gator Caper"	December 19, 1959
The alligator, knocked out by La Fitt, makes friends with Ruff after he revives him.
108	1.04	"Chip Off the Ol' Chopper"	December 26, 1959
Ruff names the alligator Chopper, and adds him to the pirate posse.
109	1.05	"Lafitt to Be Tied"	December 26, 1959
La Fitt is cornered but makes an escape.
110	1.06	"Hide and Seek with a Sneak on Okeechokee Creek"	December 26, 1959
Ruff, Reddy and Sheriff Pickens try to find La Fitt's hideout.
111	1.07	"Boom Boom Doom"	January 2, 1960
La Fitt turns his cannons on our heroes.
112	1.08	"Spellbound Fool in a Round Whirlpool"	January 2, 1960
LaFitt creates a whirlpool to stop Pickens, Ruff and Reddy.
113	1.09	"Fast Chase Through a Spooky Place"	January 2, 1960
Our heroes look for LaFitt's hideout.
114	1.10	"Looks Like the End for a Cotton Pickin' Friend"	January 9, 1960
Cotton Pickens nearly meets his doom.
115	1.11	"No Laff on Half a Raft"	January 9, 1960
Chopper nearly destroys the raft our heroes are using.
116	1.12	"Gator Thrills and Whooshmobils"	January 9, 1960
Ruff turns Chopper into a makeshift whooshmobile.
117	1.13	"Trapped and Snapped Sap"	January 9, 1960
Chopper helps with the final corralling of LaFitt.
118	2.01	"Spooky Meeting at Spooky Rock"	January 16, 1960
Ruff and Reddy are trainbound for Spooky Rock where a rendezvous with Professor Gizmo is to take place.
119	2.02	"Dig the Bigger Digger"	January 16, 1960
Gizmo presents his invention, a mobile borer with which he plans to gather substrata data in the mountains. The outlaws Killer and Diller follow our heroes.
120	2.03	"The Secret Bizz of Professor Gizz"	January 16, 1960
Killer and Diller watch in amazement as Gizmo tests out his borer.
121	2.04	"Test Hop Flip Flop"	January 23, 1960
Satisfied with the borer's success, Killer and Diller plan to hijack it with the plan of finding the Lost Dutchman mine.
122	2.05	"Sticks and Stones and Aching Bones"	January 23, 1960
Killer and Diller show up and force Gizmo to drive the borer to the Lost Dutchman mine.
123	2.06	"Gun, Gun, Who's Got the Gun?"	January 23, 1960
After a lights-out fight, Ruff gets the drop on Killer and Diller. Reddy ties them up and transports them away to the nearest jail.
124	2.07	"Big Papoose on the Loose"	January 30, 1960
A bump in the road causes Killer and Diller to bump off Reddy's car. The outlaws make a getaway with Reddy in pursuit.
125	2.08	"Mine, Mine, All Mine Gold Mine"	January 30, 1960
Jumping off a railroad bridge, Killer and Diller land in a river. Reddy returns to the borer.
126	2.09	"Gold Data in the Sub-Strata"	January 30, 1960
Gizmo, Ruff and Reddy discover an illuminated mine. Killer and Diller discover a secret entrance back to the mine.
127	2.10	"The Ghost with the Most"	February 6, 1960
Our heroes meet Schultz, the ghost of the Lost Dutchman. Killer and Diller pursue him in a merry chase.
128	2.11	"In the Soup with a Supernatural Snoop"	February 6, 1960
Killer and Diller force Ruff, Reddy and Gizmo into piling the borer with bags of gold.
129	2.12	"Sneaky Knaves in the Caves"	February 6, 1960
Schultz secretly leads our heroes to a safe place while having fun at Killer and Diller's expense.
130	2.13	"Tailspin Twins"	February 6, 1960
Schultz lets Killer and Diller leave with all the gold they can carry. But there's a catch -- the gold disappears once the two are outside, and their entrance is sealed off.
131	3.01	"Sky High Fly Guys"	February 13, 1960
After running afoul of a carnival policeman, Ruff and Reddy hide out in a hot-air balloon which slips its moorings.
132	3.02	"A Tisket, a Tasket, Who Lost Their Basket?"	February 13, 1960
Ruff and Reddy find themselves in midair.
133	3.03	"Three's a Crowd in a Cloud"	February 13, 1960
Ruff and Reddy try to ward off a giant vulture which is attacking their balloon.
134	3.04	"Fine Feathered Birds of a Feather"	February 20, 1960
Ruff and Reddy land near an island and hear a voice repeatedly calling, "Help! Murder! Police!"
135	3.05	"A Bird in Hand Is a Handy Bird"	February 20, 1960
Our heroes find a Swedish sailor, Skipper Kipper, and his parrot Squawky Talky, held prisoner by Captain Greedy and Saltwater Daffy. The two yeggs want a map to a treasure from Kipper.
136	3.06	"No Laffy Daffy"	February 20, 1960
Guarding the shack where Kipper and Squawky Talky are imprisoned, Daffy hears Ruff and Reddy's voices.
137	3.07	"Tiff on a Skiff"	February 27, 1960
Ruff and Reddy help Kipper and Squawky escape, much to Captain Greedy's irritation.
138	3.08	"Sub-a-Dub-Dub"	February 27, 1960
Our heroes and Skipper and Kipper commandeer Captain Greedy's sub.
139	3.09	"Squawky No Talky"	February 27, 1960
Having returned to power of their ship, Greedy threatens bodily harm to Squawky Talky if Kipper doesn't reveal the map.
140	3.10	"Big Beak Tweaks Big Sneak"	March 5, 1960
Squawky Talky turns the tables on Saltwater Daffy.
141	3.11	"Off on a Toot with the Loot to Boot"	March 5, 1960
Captain Greedy and Saltwater Daffy leave the island under the pretense of giving up the search. Skipper Kipper reveals the map to Ruff and Reddy.
142	3.12	"Thanks a Lot for X Marks the Spot"	March 5, 1960
Once the treasure's location is exposed, Greedy and Daffy return.
143	3.13	"Tale of a Sail in a Whale"	March 5, 1960
Greedy and Daffy obtain the treasure, which winds up getting swallowed by a whale.
144	4.01	"Misguided Missile"	March 12, 1960
Ruff and Reddy answer an ad for the promise of travel and adventure. A wily professor tricks them into taking off in a rocket ship.
145	4.02	"Triple Trouble Trip!"	March 12, 1960
The professor instructs Ruff and Reddy to gather information on the moon as they orbit around it.
146	4.03	"Around the Moon in Eighty Ways"	March 12, 1960
An errant button press sends the rocket off course.
147	4.04	"Button, Button, Who Pushed the Button?"	March 19, 1960
The rocket heads for a mysterious planet.
148	4.05	"No Traces of Aces in Spaces"	March 19, 1960
The boys are held captive by a race of tiny aliens, the Lillipunies.
149	4.06	"Lillipunies Meet Mooney Goonies"	March 19, 1960
Bound by the Lillipunies, Ruff and Reddy plead their case.
150	4.07	"Little Guys are a Big Surprise"	March 26, 1960
Ruff and Reddy, along with the Lillipunies, are menaced by a creature called the Blop.
151	4.08	"Two Is Company — a Million Is a Little Crowded"	March 26, 1960
Reddy's dander is raised when he sees the Blop picking on the Lillipunies.
152	4.09	"Big Bop for a Big Blop"	March 26, 1960
Reddy fights back against the Blop, who takes Ruff captive.
153	4.10	"Things Get Tough for Ruff — Sure 'Nuff"	April 2, 1960
Reddy searches the Blop's cave for Ruff.
154	4.11	"Whap — Caught in a Trap by a Sap"	April 2, 1960
The Lillipunies help Reddy construct a spider web with which the catch the Blop.
155	4.12	"Spin - Spin a Web to Catch a Blop In"	April 2, 1960
The boys beat a hasty retreat to their rocket.
156	4.13	"Have Blop - Will Travel"	April 2, 1960
After the Blop gets away in the boys' rocket, the Lillipunies come up with a mode of transportation for Ruff and Reddy to return to Earth.
