= Miss U.S. Television =

Miss U.S. Television is a series of contests held by the DuMont Television Network and its affiliates during 1950. The contest searched for the woman "with the most outstanding talent and beauty".

The grand finals, aired September 3, 1950, featured 13 contestants, including Edie Adams, then known as Edith Adams, who performed an opera aria and won the contest. Broadcast from the Chicago Fair of 1950, a brief clip of the grand finals was shown during the WGN-TV 40th Anniversary Special in 1988.

== Episode status ==
No copies of the local broadcasts are known to exist. The nationally aired Grand Finals episode is at the Museum of Broadcast Communications and on Internet Archive.

== See also ==
- List of programs broadcast by the DuMont Television Network
- List of surviving DuMont Television Network broadcasts

== Bibliography ==
- David Weinstein, The Forgotten Network: DuMont and the Birth of American Television (Philadelphia: Temple University Press, 2004) ISBN 1-59213-245-6
- Alex McNeil, Total Television, Fourth edition (New York: Penguin Books, 1980) ISBN 0-14-024916-8
- Tim Brooks and Earle Marsh, The Complete Directory to Prime Time Network TV Shows, Third edition (New York: Ballantine Books, 1964) ISBN 0-345-31864-1
