= List of surviving DuMont Television Network broadcasts =

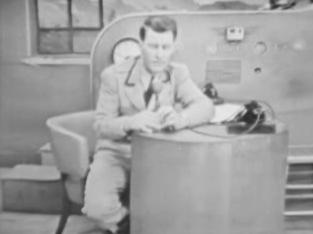
Still from Captain Video and His Video Rangers, one of DuMont's most popular programs.

The DuMont Television Network was launched in 1946 and ceased broadcasting in 1956. Allen DuMont, who created the network, preserved most of what it produced in kinescope format. By 1958, however, much of the library had been destroyed to recover the silver content of the film prints, and eventually the remaining material was simply discarded. Since then, there has been extensive research on which DuMont programs have episodes extant.

For a list of program series aired on DuMont, see List of programs broadcast by the DuMont Television Network.

== Held by the UCLA Film & Television Archive ==
- A.N.T.A. Album of 1955 – special shown on March 28, 1955
- The Admiral Broadway Revue – one episode (March 4, 1949)
- All About Baby – three episodes (June–July 1955)
- The Bigelow Theatre – nine episodes, including October 4, 1951, and series finale from December 27)
- Boxing from Eastern Parkway – 30 episodes, ranging from December 1, 1952, to October 26, 1953
- Boxing from St. Nicholas Arena – five episodes (including August 6, 1956, finale, the last program aired on DuMont)
- Boxing with Dennis James – three episodes from 1949 to 1950, possibly including episodes of Boxing from Jamaica Arena (1948–49), Amateur Boxing Fight Club (1949–50) or Boxing from Sunnyside Gardens (1949–55)
- Captain Video and His Video Rangers – 24 episodes, ranging from at least 1949–1953
- Cavalcade of Bands - 1 episode from September 4, 1951, with Charlie Spivak and Orch., The Haydens, Morey Amsterdam, The Mello-Larks, Bob Hammond's Birds, others.
- Cavalcade of Stars – 15 episodes, ranging from September 1949 to October 26, 1951
- Champagne and Orchids – two episodes (with guests Eric Thorsen and Yul Brynner)
- Charlie Wild, Private Detective – two episodes (including May 6, 1952; UCLA has another 13 episodes from the CBS and ABC eras)
- Colonel Humphrey Flack – 12 episodes, ranging from October 14, 1953, to February 9, 1954
- Concert Tonight – one episode from 1954 and one from 1953. The latter aired on WGN on December 3, 1953, though it's unclear when it aired over the network.
- Cosmopolitan Theatre - one episode from October 23, 1951, "Reward, One Million".
- Dark of Night – one episode (January 30, 1953)
- Doorway to Fame – two episodes (March 30 and April 1949)
- Eloise Salutes the Stars - one episode from Jan. 4, 1952, featuring guest Elsa Maxwell.
- Front Page Detective – 17 episodes
- Front Row Center – one episode from 1949
- Georgetown University Forum – one episode (December 13, 1951)
- The Goldbergs – 71 restored episodes, including all 22 surviving DuMont Kine-scopes, available on DVD
- The Growing Paynes – one episode from 1949
- Gruen Playhouse – two episodes (May 22 and June 19, 1952)
- Guide Right – 18 episodes
- Happy's Party - a 10-minute segment from February 5, 1955, aired on KDKA-TV Pittsburgh. (WDTV changed to KDKA-TV only a few days prior, and the show was long off the network by this point, but it's the only surviving example of the program)
- International Playhouse – 12 episodes (although not all can be confirmed as DuMont episodes)
- Jimmy Hughes, Rookie Cop – one episode (network premiere from May 8, 1953)
- The Johns Hopkins Science Review – three episodes (1951; October 7, 1952; and 1953), one of which features Wernher von Braun
- Joseph Schildkraut Presents – one episode (November 18, 1953); another six episodes, ranging from December 4, 1951, to April 23, 1952, are from the earlier ABC series Personal Appearance Theatre, which also featured Schildkraut and may have been shown on DuMont stations
- Kids and Company – one episode (season one finale, June 1, 1952), one of the very few surviving daytime DuMont broadcasts; while host Johnny Olson states that the program is going on a ten-week hiatus. Featured is Kid of the Year, Jimmy Carrick.
- Life Is Worth Living – four episodes (October 1951 and three from 1955)
- The Magic Cottage – two episodes (1950 and February 27, 1954)
- Major Dell Conway of The Flying Tigers - 20 episodes from the series run.
- Marge and Jeff – 27 episodes (ranging from September 28, 1953, to September 1, 1954), one excerpt (May 20, 1954)
- Melody Street – two episodes (including January 1, 1954), one excerpt
- The Morey Amsterdam Show – 48 episodes, ranging from November 21, 1949, to August 31, 1950.
- Newsweek Views the News (also known as Newsweek Analysis) – two episodes (February 27 and April 17, 1950)
- Not for Publication – 12 episodes, including shows ranging from May 13, 1951, to April 15, 1952
- The Original Amateur Hour – three episodes, one excerpt
- Pantomime Quiz – two episodes, plus a larger number of CBS episodes
- Passaic: Birthplace of Television and the DuMont Story (early television movie) – live television play aired November 14, 1951
- The Paul Dixon Show – one episode (network premiere from September 29, 1952)
- Pulse of the City – three episodes from 1953
- Rocky King, Inside Detective – 37 episodes, ranging from 1951 to 1954
- Star Time – four episodes (November 21 and 28, 1950 plus January 16 and February 6, 1951), one excerpt
- Time For Reflection - one episode from December, 1950
- The Stranger – two episodes (September 24 and November 12, 1954)
- The Ted Steele Show – one episode (series finale from July 12, 1949)
- This Is Music – two episodes (1951 and April 1952)
- Top 12 Business Leaders (30-minute special aired May 28, 1951, from the 21 Club in New York City)
- The Vincent Lopez Show – one episode from 1950
- Window on the World – one episode (March 25, 1949)
- Wisdom of the Ages – one episode (June 16, 1953)
- You Asked for It – two episodes (#8 and #31)

== Held by the Paley Center for Media ==
In addition to the below, there is one listing each for Famous Jury Trials and Small Fry Club, neither of which have any information other than the catalog number.

- Adlai Stevenson Speech From Salt Lake City – telecast of a speech by presidential candidate Adlai Stevenson hosted by U.S. Representative from Utah Walter K. Granger (14 October 1952)
- The Admiral Broadway Revue – 18 episodes of the 19-show run, including the January 28 premiere and June 3 finale
- And Everything Nice – one episode from 1949
- At Home With Billie Burke – one episode
- Better Living TV Theater – one episode ("From Every Mountain Top")
- The Big Issue (a.k.a. Keep Posted) – one episode ("Peace in the Middle East", aired November 2, 1952)
- Blind Date – one episode (August 25, 1953)
- The Cases of Eddie Drake – one episode, "Sleep Well, Angel" (May 1, 1952)
- Cavalcade of Stars – 17 episodes, possibly more (the Paley Center has several further Cavalcade kinescopes, for which the exact content is unclear)
- Charlie Wild, Private Detective – four episodes, possibly five
- Colonel Humphrey Flack – two episodes
- Court of Current Issues – 14-minute fragment (March 3, 1949)
- Dollar a Second – one episode
- The Ernie Kovacs Show/The Ernie Kovacs Rehearsal – one episode (March 21, 1955); although only airing on flagship station WABD, at least one major historian considers it a DuMont program since the network intended to broadcast it nationally, a plan that came just months before the network's collapse.
- Flight to Rhythm – two episodes (March 10 and May 15, 1949)
- The Growing Paynes – four episodes, possibly five
- Guide Right – two episodes (including August 14, 1953)
- Hold That Camera – one episode (December 1, 1950)
- The Johns Hopkins Science Review – eight episodes, ranging from September 18, 1951, to February 2, 1953 (plus one marked as "series finale")
- Kids and Company – two episodes (March 25, 1952, sometimes listed as 1951 and May 24, 1952, season one finale, often listed as June 1
- Life Begins at Eighty – one episode
- Life Is Worth Living – unknown number
- The Magic Cottage – one episode (December 28, 1950)
- Marge and Jeff – four episodes from 1954
- The Morey Amsterdam Show – two episodes (April 28 and June 9, 1949; features Art Carney in a supporting role)
- New York Times Youth Forum – one episode (September 27, 1952)
- Once Upon a Tune – three episodes from 1951, including May 8 (a rare example of satirical programming from DuMont)
- Opera Cameos – eight episodes, including December 13, 1953, and March 12, 1955
- Operation Success – two episodes from 1948
- Photographic Horizons – one episode (August 25, 1948)
- Rocky King, Inside Detective – seven episodes, including November 15, 1953
- Stop the Play – one episode
- Swing Into Sports – one episode (August 29, 1948) of series on WABD
- This Is Music – two episodes

== Held by the Museum of Broadcast Communications ==
- The Admiral Broadway Revue – one episode
- The Adventures of Ellery Queen – one episode
- Captain Video and His Video Rangers – two episodes
- Cavalcade of Stars – one episode
- Don McNeill's Breakfast Club – two episodes
- The Johns Hopkins Science Review – one episode
- Kids and Company – one episode
- Life Is Worth Living – five episodes
- Miss U.S. Television Grand Finals – special aired September 30, 1950
- The Morey Amsterdam Show – five episodes
- Public Prosecutor – one episode
- Rocky King, Inside Detective – one episode
- Sense and Nonsense – one episode (February 19, 1954); sources indicate that this was a local series aired on WABD
- Sports Showcase – one episode
- They Stand Accused – one episode
- Tom Corbett, Space Cadet – one episode
- Twenty Questions – one episode (January 18, 1952)
- Washington Journal – one episode (unknown; possibly an episode of Washington Report [1951] or Washington Exclusive [1953], both broadcast by DuMont)

== Held by the Library of Congress ==
The J. Fred & Leslie W. MacDonald Collection, formerly MacDonald & Associates film archive in Chicago, is now held by the Library of Congress. In addition to the below, the collection also holds eighteen 30- and 60-second commercials produced in 1951 for DuMont TV receivers.

- The Admiral Broadway Revue – three half-hour segments
- The Adventures of Ellery Queen – one episode (December 21, 1950)
- The Alan Dale Show – one episode (June 1948)
- The Armed Forces Hour – two 15-minute segments
- The Arthur Murray Party – one hour-long episode, one half-hour episode, and four half-hour segments
- The Bigelow Theatre (a.k.a. Hollywood Half Hour and Marquee Theatre in syndication) – one CBS episode from February 11, 1951 ("Agent from Scotland Yard"), may have aired on DuMont during the fall of 1951
- Captain Video and His Video Rangers – one episode
- Cavalcade of Stars – one full Gleason episode and three segments
- Chance of a Lifetime – one episode
- Dilemma – one episode
- Easy Aces – one episode
- Eloise Salutes the Stars – two episodes, weekly series hosted by Eloise McElhone
- Fashions on Parade – two episodes
- Flash Gordon – two episodes, "Escape into Time" (October 8, 1954) and "The Witch of Neptune" (March 4, 1955)
- Hold That Camera – one episode (October 20, 1950)
- It's a Small World – one episode from 1953
- Life Begins at Eighty – two episodes
- Life Is Worth Living – six episodes
- The Morey Amsterdam Show – two half-hour segments
- Night Editor – entire series (46 episodes)
- The Old American Barn Dance – three episodes
- Pentagon Washington – one episode (series finale from November 24, 1952)
- The Plainclothesman – one episode
- Rebound (a.k.a. Counterpoint in syndication) – two episodes
- Rocky King, Inside Detective – two episodes
- Sports for All – one episode
- Star Time – five half-hour segments
- Stars on Parade – two episodes
- Steve Randall (a.k.a. Hollywood Off-Beat) – four episodes from 1952 (June 12, July 3, August 14, and September 11)
- They Stand Accused – one episode (December 23, 1950)
- Twenty Questions – one episode (January 18, 1952)
- What's the Story – one episode (December 1953), featuring interviews with Allen B. DuMont and Dr. Thomas T. Goldsmith Jr.
- Who's Who With Wendy Barrie – one episode (June 1949)

== Held by TV4U ==
TV4U was a service of the TVS Television Network. Much of its archive can be found at TVS's Dailymotion page.

Note: Only one episode of the following.

- The Admiral Broadway Revue – one episode
- Captain Video and His Video Rangers – one episode
- The Cases of Eddie Drake – one episode
- Cavalcade of Stars – one episode
- Don McNeill's Breakfast Club – one episode
- Front Page Detective – one episode
- Hold That Camera – one episode (December 1, 1950)
- The Morey Amsterdam Show – one episode
- Okay, Mother – one episode (July 18, 1950)
- Rebound (a.k.a. Counterpoint in syndication) – one episode
- Rocky King, Inside Detective – one episode
- Sense and Nonsense – one episode (February 19, 1954)
- Star Time – one episode
- Tom Corbett, Space Cadet – one episode
- Twenty Questions – one episode (January 18, 1952)

== Held by the Internet Archive ==
The Internet Archive collection is limited to those shows which have lapsed into the public domain.

- The Adventures of Ellery Queen – four episodes (December 21, 1950, plus March 29, May 10, and November 8, 1951)
- The Arthur Murray Show – half a 60-minute episode (October 22, 1950) with Reginald Gardiner and Lily Ann Carol
- Captain Video and His Video Rangers – four episodes (one from 1949, one from 1952, and two from the 1950s)
- Cavalcade of Stars – two episodes hosted by Jerry Lester (June 3, 1950, and another 1950 show, although it has been suggested that the latter is a collection of skits from two episodes) and several hosted by Jackie Gleason (clips from August 19 and September 2, 1950; August 26, 1950, October 10, 1951, and clips of one or two other episodes)
- Flash Gordon – twelve episodes, ranging from October 1, 1954, to June 24, 1955
- Front Page Detective – one episode (March 16, 1951)
- The Goldbergs – 22 episodes from 1954, ranging from May 4 to the October 19 network finale
- Hold That Camera – one episode (December 1, 1950)
- The Johns Hopkins Science Review – six episodes (March 20, 1951; January 7, February 18, and May 5, 1952; February 17, 1954; and another 1954 episode)
- Kids and Company – one episode (series finale from June 1, 1952)
- Life Is Worth Living – one episode, discussing angels (according to comments on the upload, not a typical episode)
- Man Against Crime – "Murder in the Rough" (November 8, 1953) and "Murder Mountain" (December 6, 1953)
- Miss U.S. Television Grand Finals – special aired September 30, 1950
- The Morey Amsterdam Show – two episodes (April 21, 1949, and September 21 or 28, 1950)
- Okay, Mother – one episode (July 18, 1950)
- The Old American Barn Dance – seven episodes from Summer 1953
- On Your Way – one episode (January 1954)
- Public Prosecutor – "The Case of the Comic-Strip Murder" (September 20, 1951) and "The Case of the Man Who Wasn't There" (January 17, 1952)
- Rocky King, Inside Detective – four episodes (July 13 and August 31, 1952; 1953; and "One Minute for Murder")
- The School House – one episode (March 22, 1949)
- Sense and Nonsense – one episode (February 19, 1954)
- Steve Randall (a.k.a. Hollywood Off Beat) – one episode (September 11, 1952)
- They Stand Accused – one episode (late 1954)
- Tom Corbett, Space Cadet – one episode (network finale from May 22, 1954)
- Twenty Questions – one episode (January 18, 1952)
- You Asked for It – at least four episodes from 1951 (February 8, April 5, April 12 or 19, April 26, July or so); the Archive has several other episodes, but it is not certain whether those are DuMont-era shows

== Held by others ==
- Concert Tonight – one episode (November 18, 1953) held by the Peabody Award collection
- Finders Keepers - one episode Original print with all of the Coca-Cola commercials from its broadcast date of January 20, 1955 on the DuMont Network. This was a local NYC (WABD-TV) show. Show stars Fred Robbins and Peggy O'Hara. Guest star Richard Egan for "Underwater". on Youtube.
- The Johns Hopkins Science Review – most of the DuMont series survives at the Johns Hopkins University archives.
- Keep Posted – one episode from 1952 ("Should Truman be Renominated?") held by the Peabody Award collection
- Life Is Worth Living –a large number are held by Diocese of Rochester Archives, nearly the complete run of the series.
- Man Against Crime – 32 episodes available on 8 DVDs (5 out of the 38 Dumont episodes, rest are from the final CBS season)
- Meet the Boss – one episode held by the Peabody Award collection
- NFL on DuMont – highlight footage from a sideline camera, without audio, from the 1953 NFL Championship Game; also limited highlights from week 1 and week 6 Saturday Night Football games (see Pro Football Highlights below) on YouTube
- Off the Record – one episode (October 18, 1951) from WTTG with Art Lamb and Aletha Agee at YouTube
- Pro Football Highlights / Time for Football — two episodes (Week 1 and Week 6, 1954) at YouTube, this also includes limited game footage from NFL on DuMont games
- Studio 57 – entire series (including DuMont-aired episodes) is very likely held by Universal Television. Unlike most DuMont series, it was produced directly on film by an outside production company (Revue Productions), whose successor renewed the copyrights to the episodes, including those aired on DuMont, which may confirm their existence. (See US Copyright Office website for registrations.)
- This Is the Life – one episode (September 9, 1952, premiere) at YouTube
- Tom Corbett, Space Cadet – unknown number held by Wade Williams Productions
- Twenty Questions – one episode (November 16, 1953) held by DePauw University and at YouTube
- The Wendy Barrie Show – one episode at YouTube featuring Jack Shaindlin as guest
- Archivist Ira Gallen has an unknown number of DuMont network broadcasts.
- DuMont historian and former broadcaster Clarke Ingram also held an unknown number of DuMont network broadcasts during his lifetime.
- The estate of Dennis James may own a substantial amount of programming with him as host (some of which may have been the original source of programs in other collections); James kept an archive with samples of his work as a résumé supplement during his lifetime.
- WWE has footage of DuMont wrestling matches held in the New York/Washington D.C. area (including footage from Madison Square Garden III among other wrestling footage from this period, most notably featuring Gorgeous George), which is from WWE's direct corporate predecessor, the Capitol Wrestling Corporation. The McMahon family (in particular patriarch Jess McMahon and later Vince McMahon, Sr.), owners of the then-CWC, archived this footage on their own and not through DuMont.
- More DuMont-era wrestling footage has turned up with a collector in Japan.
- Other shows at YouTube.
- Several shows at Dailymotion
- A Roku channel, Days of DuMont, streams over 100 shows upgraded to 1080p, many with improved audio.
