= Norwegian Germanic Army =

Norwegian neo-Nazi paramilitary guerrilla

The Norwegian Germanic Army (Norwegian: Norges Germanske Armé, NGA) was a Norwegian neo-Nazi paramilitary guerrilla led by Espen Lund, an army sergeant. Formed as a secret group in 1980, the group was exposed and subsequently banned in 1981 following the "Hadeland murders".

== Hadeland murders ==
The NGA was exposed in 1981, when Lund and two other members of the group, Johnny Olsen and Jon Charles Hoff were charged with the murders of two other affiliates to prevent them from reporting a large theft of weapons from a Home Guard depot to the police. Lund had reportedly ordered them murdered after they had demanded payment for the weapons stolen. The two murder victims were shot multiple times with a pistol and a submachine gun on 21 February at a bridge in Hadeland, followed by a police car chase in which Olsen and Hoff were apprehended. Lund was later arrested at his cabin for psychological co-conspiracy.

Lund claimed that the ODESSA organisation had recruited him and that the organisation had at least fifty members in the Norwegian Armed Forces. According to their sentencing the group only consisted of the three men. In an interview with Swedish journalist Jan Guillou in 1985, Olsen said that the group in reality was just a couple of youths with "boyhood dreams and fantasies about creating something exciting". The NGA aimed to train members in sabotage and guerrilla warfare for a far-right takeover in Norway, and sought to exterminate all foreign guest workers in Norway. In 1982 Lund and Olsen were sentenced to eighteen years imprisonment, and Hoff to twelve years for what became known as the "Hadeland murders".

In 2010 it was revealed that the two murder victims at the time were agents or informants for the Norwegian Police Surveillance Agency (POT). One of the two had in fact reported the weapons theft some days ahead of the murders, which had caused the group to come under surveillance of over fifty undercover agents. The lawyer of one of the convicted murderers responded to the new information that the police should have been able to prevent the murders. He however said that he did not believe the two murder victims were infiltrators from the agency, but rather that they were original members who had gotten cold feet after two large weapons thefts. The case remains classified.
