= Kids and Company =

- Presented by: Johnny Olson; Ham Fisher
- Country of origin: United States

Original release
- Network: DuMont
- Release: September 1, 1951 – May 2, 1953

Kids and Company is an American children's TV show that aired on the now-defunct DuMont Television Network on Saturday mornings from September 1, 1951, to May 2, 1953, and was hosted by Johnny Olson (billed as "Johnny Olsen" in the credits) and Ham Fisher. The series was primarily sponsored by Red Goose Shoes.

This was Olson's third series for DuMont, previously hosting the talent show Doorway to Fame and daytime variety series Johnny Olson's Rumpus Room.

== Episode status ==
The season one finale on May 24, 1952, is held by the UCLA Film and Television Archive. In that episode, Olson stated that the show would return for another season on August 9, 1952, after a ten-week hiatus, marking the anticipated changeover by leading the cast in "Auld Lang Syne," noting that a time had not been decided and that viewers would have to consult their newspapers. The season two premiere, aired on August 9 as mentioned previously, is among the episodes lost. Other episodes are held by the Paley Center for Media and the Museum of Broadcast Communications.

== See also ==
- List of programs broadcast by the DuMont Television Network
- List of surviving DuMont Television Network broadcasts
- List of local children's television series

== Bibliography ==
- David Weinstein, The Forgotten Network: DuMont and the Birth of American Television (Philadelphia: Temple University Press, 2004) ISBN 1-59213-245-6
- Alex McNeil, Total Television, Fourth edition (New York: Penguin Books, 1980) ISBN 0-14-024916-8
- Tim Brooks and Earle Marsh, The Complete Directory to Prime Time Network TV Shows, Third edition (New York: Ballantine Books, 1964) ISBN 0-345-31864-1
