= 1962–63 United States network television schedule =

Primetime TV schedule for U.S. networks from September 1962 to August 1963

The following is the 1962–63 network television schedule for the three major English language commercial broadcast networks in the United States. The schedule covers primetime hours from September 1962 through August 1963. The schedule is followed by a list per network of returning series, new series, and series cancelled after the 1961–62 season.

== Summary ==
Television historians Harry Castleman and Walter Podrazik (1982) state, "Despite all the promises of programming reform made by television executives in May, 1961" (the month of Newton Minow's landmark speech "Television and the Public Interest"), "the 1962–63 schedule turned out to be business as usual". Castleman and Podrazik point out that although the three networks had added generally well-made public-affairs and news programs to their schedules, there were "too many of them and their sheer number diluted the audience and stretched resources far too thin to allow quality productions each week". CBS aired CBS Reports and Eyewitness, NBC broadcast Chet Huntley Reporting, David Brinkley's Journal and Actuality Specials, while ABC had Bell and Howell Close-up and the Howard K. Smith show. Despite Minow's complaints that the sitcoms of the era were "totally unrealistic" and his disdain for cartoons, the new sitcoms of 1962 were even more hostile to Minow's stated taste and were frequently "stretching further than ever for their situations"; increasingly fantastical premises such as hillbillies in the city (The Beverly Hillbillies) and cartoons set a century into the future (The Jetsons, ABC's first regularly scheduled TV series to air in color) were among the new offerings.

This was the first season that ABC aired some of their prime-time programs in color.

== Schedule ==
New fall series are highlighted in bold. All times are Eastern and Pacific.

Each of the 30 highest-rated shows is listed with its rank and rating as determined by Nielsen Media Research.

Yellow indicates the programs in the top 10 for the season.
Cyan indicates the programs in the top 20 for the season.
Magenta indicates the programs in the top 30 for the season.

=== Sunday ===
Network		7:00 PM	7:30 PM	8:00 PM	8:30 PM	9:00 PM	9:30 PM	10:00 PM	10:30 PM
ABC	Fall	Father Knows Best (repeats)	**The Jetsons** (In COLOR)	Hollywood Special (Sporadically in COLOR)				The Voice of Firestone	Howard K. Smith: News and Comment
ABC	Winter	Local	**The Jetsons** (In COLOR)	Hollywood Special (Sporadically in COLOR)				The Voice of Firestone	Howard K. Smith: News and Comment
CBS		Lassie (19/23.3) (Tied with The Garry Moore Show and To Tell the Truth)	Dennis the Menace	The Ed Sullivan Show (14/25.3)		The McCoys	**GE True***	Candid Camera (2/31.1) (Tied with The Red Skelton Show)	What's My Line? (13/25.5)
NBC		**Ensign O'Toole**	Walt Disney's Wonderful World of Color (24/22.3) (In COLOR)		Car 54, Where Are You?	Bonanza (4/29.8) (Tied with The Lucy Show) (In COLOR)		The Du Pont Show of the Week / The Dinah Shore Show (In COLOR) / Various NBC News Specials	

* formerly known as General Electric Theater * McKeever and the Colonel aired Sundays at 6:30-7 on NBC. * The Bullwinkle Show aired Sundays at 5:30-6 on NBC. * Password aired Sundays at 6:30-7 on CBS. * The Dinah Shore Show aired Sundays every 3 or 4 weeks at 10 on NBC In COLOR.

=== Monday ===
Network		7:00 PM	7:30 PM	8:00 PM	8:30 PM	9:00 PM	9:30 PM	10:00 PM	10:30 PM
ABC	Fall	Local	Cheyenne		The Rifleman	**Stoney Burke**		Ben Casey (7/28.7) (Tied with The Danny Thomas Show)	
ABC	Winter	Local	**The Dakotas**		The Rifleman	**Stoney Burke**		Ben Casey (7/28.7) (Tied with The Danny Thomas Show)	
CBS	Fall	Local (7:00) / Walter Cronkite with the News* (7:15)	To Tell the Truth (19/23.3) (Tied with The Garry Moore Show and Lassie)	I've Got a Secret (16/24.9)	**The Lucy Show** (4/29.8) (Tied with Bonanza)	The Danny Thomas Show (7/28.7) (Tied with Ben Casey)	The Andy Griffith Show (6/29.7)	**The New Loretta Young Show**	**Stump the Stars*****
CBS	Summer	Local (7:00) / Walter Cronkite with the News* (7:15)	To Tell the Truth (19/23.3) (Tied with The Garry Moore Show and Lassie)	I've Got a Secret (16/24.9)	**Vacation Playhouse****	The Danny Thomas Show (7/28.7) (Tied with Ben Casey)	The Andy Griffith Show (6/29.7)	**The New Loretta Young Show**	**Stump the Stars*****
NBC	Fall	Local (7:00) / The Huntley–Brinkley Report* (7:15)	**It's a Man's World******		**Saints and Sinners**		The Price is Right (In COLOR)	David Brinkley's Journal (Sporadically in COLOR)	Local
NBC	Winter	Local (7:00) / The Huntley–Brinkley Report* (7:15)	**NBC Monday Night at the Movies** (most in COLOR)				The Art Linkletter Show	David Brinkley's Journal (Sporadically in COLOR)	Local

Notes: * In some areas, Walter Cronkite with the News and The Huntley-Brinkley Report aired at 6:45 p.m.(ET). ** Vacation Playhouse was an anthology series composed entirely of unsold television pilots. *** Stump the Stars was formerly Pantomime Quiz. **** It's a Man's World was shown in color on October 1, 1962. Password aired at 10:00 pm on CBS starting March 25.

=== Tuesday ===
Network		7:00 PM	7:30 PM	8:00 PM	8:30 PM	9:00 PM	9:30 PM	10:00 PM	10:30 PM
ABC		Local	**Combat!**		Hawaiian Eye		The Untouchables		Bell and Howell Closeup
CBS	Fall	Local (7:00) / Walter Cronkite with the News (7:15)	Marshal Dillon	**The Lloyd Bridges Show**	The Red Skelton Show (2/31.1) (Tied with Candid Camera)		The Jack Benny Show (11/26.2) (Tied with Dr. Kildare)	The Garry Moore Show (19/23.3) (Tied with To Tell the Truth and Lassie)	
CBS	Summer	Local (7:00) / Walter Cronkite with the News (7:15)	Marshal Dillon	**The Lloyd Bridges Show**	The Red Skelton Show (2/31.1) (Tied with Candid Camera)		The Jack Benny Show (11/26.2) (Tied with Dr. Kildare)	**The Keefe Brasselle Show**	
NBC		Local (7:00) / The Huntley–Brinkley Report (7:15)	Laramie (In COLOR)		**Empire** (In COLOR)		The Dick Powell Show		Chet Huntley Reporting

Note: The CBS series Marshal Dillon consisted of reruns of episodes of Gunsmoke.

=== Wednesday ===
Network	7:00 PM	7:30 PM	8:00 PM	8:30 PM	9:00 PM	9:30 PM	10:00 PM	10:30 PM
ABC	Local	Wagon Train (25/22.0)		**Going My Way**		**Our Man Higgins**	Naked City	
CBS	Local (7:00) / Walter Cronkite with the News (7:15)	CBS Reports		The Many Loves of Dobie Gillis	**The Beverly Hillbillies** (1/36.0)	The Dick Van Dyke Show (9/27.1)	Armstrong Circle Theatre / The United States Steel Hour	
NBC	Local (7:00) / The Huntley–Brinkley Report (7:15)	**The Virginian** (26/21.7) (In COLOR)			Perry Como's Kraft Music Hall (In COLOR)		**The Eleventh Hour**	

=== Thursday ===
Network		7:00 PM	7:30 PM	8:00 PM	8:30 PM	9:00 PM	9:30 PM	10:00 PM	10:30 PM
ABC		Local	The Adventures of Ozzie and Harriet	The Donna Reed Show	Leave It to Beaver	My Three Sons (28/21.0)	**McHale's Navy**	Alcoa Premiere	
CBS	Fall	Local (7:00) / Walter Cronkite with the News (7:15)	Mister Ed	Perry Mason (23/22.4)		**The Nurses**		The Alfred Hitchcock Hour	
CBS	Winter	Local (7:00) / Walter Cronkite with the News (7:15)	Mister Ed	Perry Mason (23/22.4)		Twilight Zone		**The Nurses**	
NBC		Local (7:00) / The Huntley–Brinkley Report (7:15)	**Wide Country**		Dr. Kildare (11/26.2) (Tied with The Jack Benny Show)		Hazel (15/25.1) (In COLOR)	**The Andy Williams Show** (In COLOR)	

Note: Dr. Kildare and Wide Country on October 4, 1962, were shown in color.

=== Friday ===
Network		7:00 PM	7:30 PM	8:00 PM	8:30 PM	9:00 PM	9:30 PM	10:00 PM	10:30 PM
ABC	Fall	Local	**The Gallant Men**		The Flintstones (30/20.5) (In COLOR)	**I'm Dickens, He's Fenster**	77 Sunset Strip		Local
ABC	January	Local	The Valiant Years	Father Knows Best (repeats)	The Flintstones (30/20.5) (In COLOR)	**I'm Dickens, He's Fenster**	77 Sunset Strip		Local
ABC	Spring	Local	Cheyenne		The Flintstones (30/20.5) (In COLOR)	**I'm Dickens, He's Fenster**	77 Sunset Strip		Local
CBS	Fall	Local (7:00) / Walter Cronkite with the News (7:15)	Rawhide (22/22.8)		Route 66 (27/21.3)		**Fair Exchange**		Eyewitness
CBS	Winter	Local (7:00) / Walter Cronkite with the News (7:15)	Rawhide (22/22.8)		Route 66 (27/21.3)		The Alfred Hitchcock Hour		Eyewitness
NBC	Fall	Local (7:00) / The Huntley–Brinkley Report (7:15)	International Showtime		Sing Along with Mitch (In COLOR)		**Don't Call Me Charlie!**	**The Jack Paar Program** (In COLOR)	
NBC	Winter	Local (7:00) / The Huntley–Brinkley Report (7:15)	International Showtime		Sing Along with Mitch (In COLOR)		The Price Is Right (In COLOR)	**The Jack Paar Program** (In COLOR)	
NBC	Summer	Local (7:00) / The Huntley–Brinkley Report (7:15)	International Showtime		Sing Along with Mitch (In COLOR)		The Lively Ones (In COLOR)	**The Jack Paar Program** (In COLOR)	

=== Saturday ===
Network		7:00 PM	7:30 PM	8:00 PM	8:30 PM	9:00 PM	9:30 PM	10:00 PM	10:30 PM
ABC	Fall	Beany and Cecil* (In COLOR)	**The Roy Rogers and Dale Evans Show**		**Mr. Smith Goes to Washington**	The Lawrence Welk Show		The Fight of the Week (10:00) / Make That Spare (10:45)	
ABC	Winter	Beany and Cecil* (In COLOR)	**The Gallant Men**		**Mr. Smith Goes to Washington**	The Lawrence Welk Show		The Fight of the Week (10:00) / Make That Spare (10:45)	
ABC	Spring	Beany and Cecil* (In COLOR)	**The Gallant Men**		**Hootenanny**	The Lawrence Welk Show		The Fight of the Week (10:00) / Make That Spare (10:45)	
CBS	Fall	Local	The Jackie Gleason Show (17/24.1)		The Defenders (18/23.9)		Have Gun – Will Travel (29/20.8)	Gunsmoke (10/27.0)	
CBS	Summer	Local	The Lucy-Desi Comedy Hour (repeats)		The Defenders (18/23.9)		Have Gun – Will Travel (29/20.8)	Gunsmoke (10/27.0)	
NBC		Local	**Sam Benedict**		The Joey Bishop Show (In COLOR)	NBC Saturday Night at the Movies (In COLOR)			

Notes: * Formerly known as Matty's Funnies with Beany and Cecil. Sam Benedict on October 6, 1962, was shown in color.

== By network ==
=== ABC ===
Returning Series

- 77 Sunset Strip
- ABC News Reports
- The Adventures of Ozzie and Harriet
- Alcoa Premiere
- The Avengers
- Beany and Cecil *
- Bell and Howell Closeup
- Ben Casey
- Cheyenne
- The Donna Reed Show
- The Fight of the Week
- The Flintstones
- Hawaiian Eye
- Howard K. Smith: News and Comment
- The Lawrence Welk Show
- Leave It to Beaver
- Make That Spare
- My Three Sons
- Naked City
- The Rifleman
- The Untouchables
- The Voice of Firestone
- Wagon Train (moved from NBC)

New Series

- Combat!
- The Dakotas *
- The Gallant Men
- Going My Way
- Hollywood Special
- Hootenanny *
- I'm Dickens, He's Fenster
- The Jetsons
- McHale's Navy
- Mr. Smith Goes to Washington
- Our Man Higgins
- The Roy Rogers and Dale Evans Show
- Stoney Burke

Not returning from 1961–62:

- Adventures in Paradise
- Bachelor Father
- Bronco
- The Bugs Bunny Show moved to Saturday mornings
- Bus Stop
- Calvin and the Colonel
- The Detectives Starring Robert Taylor
- Expedition!
- Follow the Sun
- The Hathaways
- The Law and Mr. Jones
- Lawman
- Margie
- Matty's Funday Funnies
- The New Breed
- The Roaring 20's
- Room for One More
- The Steve Allen Show
- Straightaway
- Surfside 6
- Target: The Corruptors!
- Top Cat
- Yours for a Song

=== CBS ===
Returning Series

- The Alfred Hitchcock Hour (moved from NBC)
- The Andy Griffith Show
- Armstrong Circle Theatre
- Brenner
- CBS News Hour
- CBS Reports
- Candid Camera
- Danny Thomas Show
- The Defenders
- Dennis the Menace
- The Dick Van Dyke Show
- The Ed Sullivan Show
- Eyewitness
- The Garry Moore Show
- Gunsmoke
- Have Gun – Will Travel
- I've Got a Secret
- The Jack Benny Show
- The Jackie Gleason Show
- Lassie
- The Many Loves of Dobie Gillis
- Mister Ed
- Perry Mason
- Rawhide
- The McCoys (moved from ABC)
- The Red Skelton Show
- Route 66 (debuted 1960)
- To Tell the Truth
- The Twentieth Century
- The Twilight Zone
- The United States Steel Hour
- Walter Cronkite with the News
- What's My Line

New Series

- The Beverly Hillbillies
- Fair Exchange
- GE True
- The Keefe Brasselle Show *
- The Lloyd Bridges Show
- The Lucy Show
- The New Loretta Young Show
- The Nurses
- The Real McCoys
- Stump the Stars
- Vacation Playhouse *

Not returning from 1961–62:

- Accent on an American Summer
- The Alvin Show moved to Saturday mornings
- Armstrong Circle Theatre
- Checkmate
- The Comedy Spot
- Douglas Edwards with the News
- Father of the Bride
- Frontier Circus
- Hennesey
- Ichabod and Me
- The Investigators
- Mrs. G. Goes to College/The Gertrude Berg Show
- The New Bob Cummings Show
- Oh! Those Bells
- Pete and Gladys
- Tell It to Groucho
- Tell It to the Camera
- Window on Main Street

=== NBC ===
Returning Series

- The Art Linkletter Show
- The Bell Telephone Hour
- Bonanza
- Car 54, Where Are You?
- David Brinkley's Journal
- The Dick Powell Show
- Dr. Kildare
- The DuPont Show of the Week
- Hazel
- The Huntley–Brinkley Report
- International Showtime
- The Joey Bishop Show
- Laramie
- The Lively Ones
- NBC Saturday Night at the Movies
- Perry Como's Kraft Music Hall
- The Price Is Right
- Sing Along with Mitch
- Walt Disney's Wonderful World of Color

New Series

- The Andy Williams Show
- Don't Call Me Charlie!
- The Eleventh Hour
- Empire
- Ensign O'Toole
- It's a Man's World
- The Jack Paar Program
- McKeever and the Colonel
- NBC Monday Night at the Movies
- Saints and Sinners
- Sam Benedict
- The Virginian
- Wide Country

Not returning from 1961–62:

- 87th Precinct
- The Bob Newhart Show
- The Bullwinkle Show
- Cain's Hundred
- The Detectives Starring Robert Taylor
- The Dinah Shore Show
- Here and Now
- National Velvet
- Outlaws
- Tales of Wells Fargo
- Thriller
- Wagon Train (moved to ABC)

Note: The * indicates that the program was introduced in midseason.
