= 1961–62 United States network television schedule =

The following is the 1961–62 network television schedule for the three major English language commercial broadcast networks in the United States. The schedule covers primetime hours from September 1961 through April 1962. The schedule is followed by a list per network of returning series, new series, and series cancelled after the 1960–61 season.

The previous season had been criticized by Federal Communications Commission chairman Newton Minow in May 1961. Minow had criticized poor programs and weak network schedules, calling television a "vast wasteland" and calling on television executives to try harder to develop innovative and interesting television programs.

Television historians Castleman and Podrazik (1982) believe the 1961–62 season marked a comeback for television, as the networks rearranged their schedules to accommodate the critics. They point out CBS's high-quality legal drama The Defenders, NBC's medical drama Dr. Kildare, CBS's The Dick Van Dyke Show, and ABC's medical drama Ben Casey as bright spots in the new TV schedule. Despite the praise for these four series, the authors also highlight several less worthy series which debuted during the 1961–62 season: Room for One More, Window on Main Street, Hazel ("possibly the dumbest family in TV history"), and the truly terrible The Hathaways ("possibly the worst series ever to air on network TV").

NBC lured Disney's popular anthology series from ABC; Walt Disney's Wonderful World of Color premiered on September 24, 1961. The color programs were a change from the previous ABC programs, which had been seen in black and white.

NBC also added a movie night to its schedule; the network paid $25 million for the rights to broadcast 50 20th-Century Fox films on Saturday nights. In April 1962, ABC followed suit when it added its own Sunday night movie to its schedule.

All times are Eastern and Pacific. New fall series are highlighted in bold.

Each of the 30 highest-rated shows is listed with its rank and rating as determined by Nielsen Media Research.

Yellow indicates the programs in the top 10 for the season.
Cyan indicates the programs in the top 20 for the season.
Magenta indicates the programs in the top 30 for the season.

== Sunday ==
Network		7:00 PM	7:30 PM	8:00 PM	8:30 PM	9:00 PM	9:30 PM	10:00 PM	10:30 PM
ABC	Fall	Maverick (started at 6:30)	**Follow the Sun**		Lawman	**Bus Stop**		Adventures in Paradise	
ABC	Spring	Maverick (started at 6:30)	**Follow the Sun**		Lawman	**Hollywood Special**			
CBS		Lassie (15/24.0) (Tied with Sing Along with Mitch)	Dennis the Menace (17/23.8)	The Ed Sullivan Show (19/23.5)		General Electric Theater	The Jack Benny Program	Candid Camera (10/25.5)	What's My Line?
NBC		**The Bullwinkle Show** (In COLOR)	Walt Disney's Wonderful World of Color* (23/22.7) (In COLOR)		**Car 54, Where Are You?** (20/23.2)	Bonanza (2/30.0) (In COLOR)		**The Du Pont Show of the Week**	

* formerly Walt Disney Presents

Note: Mister Ed, previously syndicated, aired on CBS, 6:30-7 p.m.

== Monday ==
Network		7:00 PM	7:30 PM	8:00 PM	8:30 PM	9:00 PM	9:30 PM	10:00 PM	10:30 PM
ABC		Expedition!	Cheyenne / Bronco		The Rifleman (27/22.3) (Tied with The Price Is Right)	Surfside 6		**Ben Casey** (18/23.7)	
CBS	Fall	Local (7:00) / Douglas Edwards with the News (7:15)	To Tell the Truth	Pete and Gladys	**Window on Main Street**	The Danny Thomas Show (8/26.1)	The Andy Griffith Show (7/27.0)	Hennesey	I've Got a Secret
CBS	Winter	Local (7:00) / Douglas Edwards with the News (7:15)	To Tell the Truth	Pete and Gladys	Father Knows Best (repeats)	The Danny Thomas Show (8/26.1)	The Andy Griffith Show (7/27.0)	Hennesey	I've Got a Secret
CBS	Spring	Local (7:00) / **Walter Cronkite with the News** (7:15)	To Tell the Truth	Pete and Gladys	Father Knows Best (repeats)	The Danny Thomas Show (8/26.1)	The Andy Griffith Show (7/27.0)	Hennesey	I've Got a Secret
CBS	Summer	Local (7:00) / **Walter Cronkite with the News** (7:15)	To Tell the Truth	Pete and Gladys	Father Knows Best (repeats)	The Lucy-Desi Comedy Hour (repeats)		Hennesey	I've Got a Secret
NBC		Local (7:00) / The Huntley-Brinkley Report* (7:15)	Local	National Velvet	The Price Is Right (27/22.3) (Tied with The Rifleman) (In COLOR)	**87th Precinct**		Thriller	

* In some areas, Douglas Edwards with the News alongside Walter Cronkite with the News and The Huntley-Brinkley Report aired at 6:45 p.m.(ET).

== Tuesday ==
Network		7:00 PM	7:30 PM	8:00 PM	8:30 PM	9:00 PM	9:30 PM	10:00 PM	10:30 PM
ABC	Fall	Local	The Bugs Bunny Show	Bachelor Father	**Calvin and the Colonel**	**The New Breed**		**Alcoa Premiere**	
ABC	November	Local	The Bugs Bunny Show	Bachelor Father	**The New Breed**		**Yours for a Song**	**Alcoa Premiere**	
CBS	Fall	Local (7:00) / Douglas Edwards with the News (7:15)	Marshal Dillon (Gunsmoke repeats)	**The Dick Van Dyke Show**	The Many Loves of Dobie Gillis (21/22.9) (Tied with The Flintstones)	The Red Skelton Show (6/27.1)	**Ichabod and Me**	The Garry Moore Show (12/24.6)	
CBS	Winter	Local (7:00) / Douglas Edwards with the News (7:15)	Marshal Dillon (Gunsmoke repeats)	**Password**	The Many Loves of Dobie Gillis (21/22.9) (Tied with The Flintstones)	The Red Skelton Show (6/27.1)	**Ichabod and Me**	The Garry Moore Show (12/24.6)	
CBS	Spring	Local (7:00) / **Walter Cronkite with the News** (7:15)	Marshal Dillon (Gunsmoke repeats)	**Password**	The Many Loves of Dobie Gillis (21/22.9) (Tied with The Flintstones)	The Red Skelton Show (6/27.1)	**Ichabod and Me**	The Garry Moore Show (12/24.6)	
CBS	Summer	Local (7:00) / **Walter Cronkite with the News** (7:15)	Marshal Dillon (Gunsmoke repeats)	**Password**	The Many Loves of Dobie Gillis (21/22.9) (Tied with The Flintstones)	The Comedy Spot	**Ichabod and Me**	Talent Scouts	
NBC		Local (7:00) / The Huntley-Brinkley Report (7:15)	Laramie (In Living COLOR)		Alfred Hitchcock Presents	**The Dick Powell Show**		**Cain's Hundred**	

NOTE: On CBS, the summer anthology series The Comedy Spot consisted of broadcasts of unsold television pilots, one of which previously had aired in 1960 as an episode of New Comedy Showcase.

== Wednesday ==
Network		7:00 PM	7:30 PM	8:00 PM	8:30 PM	9:00 PM	9:30 PM	10:00 PM	10:30 PM
ABC	Fall	Local	The Steve Allen Show		**Top Cat**	Hawaiian Eye		Naked City	
ABC	Winter	Local	**Howard K. Smith: News and Comment**	**Straightaway**	**Top Cat**	Hawaiian Eye		Naked City	
CBS	Fall	Local (7:00) / Douglas Edwards with the News (7:15)	**The Alvin Show**	Father Knows Best (repeats)	Checkmate		**Mrs. G. Goes to College**	Armstrong Circle Theatre / The United States Steel Hour	
CBS	Winter	Local (7:00) / Douglas Edwards with the News (7:15)	**The Alvin Show**	**Window on Main Street**	Checkmate		**The Dick Van Dyke Show**	Armstrong Circle Theatre / The United States Steel Hour	
CBS	Spring	Local (7:00) / **Walter Cronkite with the News** (7:15)	**The Alvin Show**	**Window on Main Street**	Checkmate		**The Dick Van Dyke Show**	Armstrong Circle Theatre / The United States Steel Hour	
NBC		Local (7:00) / The Huntley-Brinkley Report (7:15)	Wagon Train (1/32.1)		**The Joey Bishop Show** (24/22.6)	Kraft Music Hall starring Perry Como (25/22.5) (In COLOR)		**The Bob Newhart Show**	**David Brinkley's Journal**

Note: Mrs. G. Goes to College moved to Thursday nights in January as The Gertrude Berg Show, allowing The Dick Van Dyke Show to take its time spot. Several episodes of The Joey Bishop Show and Wagon Train were shown in color.

== Thursday ==
Network		7:00 PM	7:30 PM	8:00 PM	8:30 PM	9:00 PM	9:30 PM	10:00 PM	10:30 PM
ABC	Fall	Local	The Adventures of Ozzie and Harriet	The Donna Reed Show (30/21.9) (Tied with 77 Sunset Strip)	The Real McCoys (14/24.2)	My Three Sons (11/24.7)	**Margie**	The Untouchables	
ABC	Spring	Local	The Adventures of Ozzie and Harriet	The Donna Reed Show (30/21.9) (Tied with 77 Sunset Strip)	The Real McCoys (14/24.2)	My Three Sons (11/24.7)	The Law and Mr. Jones	The Untouchables	
CBS	Fall	Local (7:00) / Douglas Edwards with the News (7:15)	**Frontier Circus**		**The Bob Cummings Show**	**The Investigators**		CBS Reports	
CBS	Winter	Local (7:00) / Douglas Edwards with the News (7:15)	**The New Bob Cummings Show**	**Frontier Circus**		**Tell It to Groucho**	**The Gertrude Berg Show**	CBS Reports	
CBS	Spring	Local (7:00) / **Walter Cronkite with the News** (7:15)	**Oh! Those Bells**	**Frontier Circus**		**Tell It to Groucho**	**The Gertrude Berg Show**	CBS Reports	
CBS	Summer	Local (7:00) / **Walter Cronkite with the News** (7:15)	**Accent on an American Summer**	**Frontier Circus**		Brenner	**The Gertrude Berg Show**	CBS Reports	
CBS	Follow-up	Local (7:00) / **Walter Cronkite with the News** (7:15)	**Frontier Circus**		Various	Brenner	**The Gertrude Berg Show**	CBS Reports	
NBC	Fall	Local (7:00) / The Huntley-Brinkley Report (7:15)	Outlaws (In COLOR)		**Dr. Kildare** (9/25.6)		**Hazel** (4/27.7)	Sing Along with Mitch (15/24.0) (Tied with Lassie) (In COLOR)	
NBC	Summer	Local (7:00) / The Huntley-Brinkley Report (7:15)	Outlaws (In COLOR)		**Dr. Kildare** (9/25.6)		**The Lively Ones**	Sing Along with Mitch (15/24.0) (Tied with Lassie) (In COLOR)	

Notes: The Bob Cummings Show was retitled The New Bob Cummings Show on December 28. The Law and Mr. Jones moved to the 9:30-10:00 p.m. time slot on ABC on April 19. Hazel on November 2, 1961 was shown in color. The episodes of Brenner that ran on CBS in the summer of 1962 were reruns of episodes from the summer of 1959.

== Friday ==
Network		7:00 PM	7:30 PM	8:00 PM	8:30 PM	9:00 PM	9:30 PM	10:00 PM	10:30 PM
ABC	Fall	Local	**Straightaway**	**The Hathaways**	The Flintstones (21/22.9) (Tied with The Many Loves of Dobie Gillis)	77 Sunset Strip (30/21.9) (Tied with The Donna Reed Show)		**Target: The Corruptors!**	
ABC	Spring	Local	**Margie**	**The Hathaways**	The Flintstones (21/22.9) (Tied with The Many Loves of Dobie Gillis)	77 Sunset Strip (30/21.9) (Tied with The Donna Reed Show)		**Target: The Corruptors!**	
CBS	Fall	Local (7:00) / Douglas Edwards with the News (7:15)	Rawhide (13/24.5)		Route 66		**Father of the Bride**	The Twilight Zone	Eyewitness*
CBS	Spring	Local (7:00) / **Walter Cronkite with the News** (7:15)	Rawhide (13/24.5)		Route 66		**Father of the Bride**	The Twilight Zone	Eyewitness*
NBC	Fall	Local (7:00) / The Huntley-Brinkley Report (7:15)	**International Showtime**		The Detectives Starring Robert Taylor		The Bell Telephone Hour / The Dinah Shore Show** (In COLOR)		**Here and Now**
NBC	Winter	Local (7:00) / The Huntley-Brinkley Report (7:15)	**International Showtime**		The Detectives Starring Robert Taylor		The Bell Telephone Hour / The Dinah Shore Show** (In COLOR)		Chet Huntley Reporting

* formerly Eyewitness To History ** formerly The Chevy Show

== Saturday ==
Network		7:00 PM	7:30 PM	8:00 PM	8:30 PM	9:00 PM	9:30 PM	10:00 PM	10:30 PM
ABC	Fall	Matty's Funday Funnies	The Roaring 20s		Leave It to Beaver	The Lawrence Welk Show		The Fight of the Week (10:00) / Make That Spare (10:45)	
ABC	Winter	**Matty's Funnies With Beany and Cecil**	**Calvin and the Colonel**	**Room for One More**	Leave It to Beaver	The Lawrence Welk Show		The Fight of the Week (10:00) / Make That Spare (10:45)	
CBS		Local	Perry Mason (5/27.3)		**The Defenders** (26/22.4)		Have Gun – Will Travel (29/22.2)	Gunsmoke (3/28.3)	
NBC		Local	Tales of Wells Fargo (In COLOR)		The Tall Man	**NBC Saturday Night at the Movies** (In COLOR)			

Room for One More aired on ABC from January 27 to July 28, 1962, 8-8:30 p.m.

Beginning January 6, Matty's Funday Funnies became Matty's Funnies With Beany & Cecil.

== By network ==
=== ABC ===
**Returning Series**

- 77 Sunset Strip
- Adventures in Paradise
- The Adventures of Ozzie and Harriet
- The Avengers
- Bachelor Father
- Bronco
- The Bugs Bunny Show
- Cheyenne
- The Donna Reed Show
- Expedition!
- The Fight of the Week
- The Flintstones
- Hawaiian Eye
- The Law and Mr. Jones
- Lawman
- The Lawrence Welk Show
- Leave It to Beaver
- Make That Spare
- Matty's Funday Funnies
- Maverick
- My Three Sons
- Naked City
- The Real McCoys
- The Rifleman
- The Roaring 20's
- The Steve Allen Show
- Surfside 6
- The Untouchables

**New Series**

- **Alcoa Premiere**
- **Ben Casey**
- **Bus Stop**
- **Calvin and the Colonel**
- **The Hathaways**
- **Howard K. Smith: News and Comment** *
- **Margie**
- **The New Breed**
- **Room for One More** *
- **Straightaway**
- **Target: The Corruptors!**
- **Top Cat**
- **Yours for a Song**

Not returning from 1960–61:

- Alcoa Presents: One Step Beyond
- The Asphalt Jungle
- Guestward, Ho!
- Harrigan and Son
- Hong Kong
- The Islanders
- The Life and Legend of Wyatt Earp
- Music for a Christmas Night
- Music for a New Year's Night; Class of 1961
- Peter Gunn
- The Rebel
- Stagecoach West
- Sugarfoot
- Take a Good Look
- Walt Disney Presents (moved to NBC as Walt Disney's Wonderful World of Color)

=== CBS ===
**Returning Series**

- The Alfred Hitchcock Hour
- The Andy Griffith Show
- Armstrong Circle Theatre
- Brenner
- Candid Camera
- CBS News Hour
- CBS Reports
- Checkmate
- The Comedy Spot (previously Comedy Spotlight)
- The Danny Thomas Show
- Dennis the Menace
- Douglas Edwards with the News
- The Ed Sullivan Show
- Eyewitness
- The Garry Moore Show
- General Electric Theatre
- Gunsmoke
- Have Gun – Will Travel
- Hennesey
- I've Got a Secret
- The Jack Benny Program
- Lassie
- The Many Loves of Dobie Gillis
- Perry Mason
- Pete and Gladys
- Rawhide
- The Red Skelton Show
- Route 66
- Secret Agent
- To Tell the Truth
- The Twentieth Century
- The Twilight Zone
- The United States Steel Hour
- What's My Line

**New Series**

- **Accent on an American Summer**
- **The Alvin Show**
- **The Defenders**
- **The Dick Van Dyke Show**
- **Eyewitness to History**
- **Father of the Bride**
- **Frontier Circus**
- **Ichabod and Me**
- **The Investigators**
- **Mister Ed** *
- **Mrs. G. Goes to College**/**The Gertrude Berg Show**
- **The New Bob Cummings Show**
- **Oh! Those Bells** *
- **Password** *
- **Tell It to Groucho** *
- **Tell It to the Camera** *
- **Walter Cronkite with the News** *
- **Window on Main Street**

Not returning from 1960–61:

- Angel
- The Ann Sothern Show
- The Aquanauts
- Bringing Up Buddy
- Dick Powell's Zane Grey Theater
- The DuPont Show with June Allyson
- Frontier Justice
- Glenn Miller Time
- Gunslinger
- Holiday Lodge
- Mr. Garlund
- My Sister Eileen
- Person to Person
- The Spike Jones Show
- Summer Sports Spectacular
- The Tom Ewell Show
- Wanted Dead or Alive
- 'Way Out
- The Witness

=== NBC ===
**Returning Series**

- The Art Linkletter Show
- The Bell Telephone Hour
- Bonanza
- Chet Huntley Reporting
- The Detectives Starring Robert Taylor
- The Dinah Shore Show
- Ford Presents the New Christy Minstrels
- The Huntley–Brinkley Report
- The Jack Benny Program
- Kraft Music Hall starring Perry Como
- Laramie
- National Velvet
- Outlaws
- Sing Along with Mitch
- Tales of Wells Fargo
- Thriller
- Wagon Train
- Walt Disney's Wonderful World of Color (moved from ABC)

**New Series**

- **87th Precinct**
- **The Bob Newhart Show**
- **The Bullwinkle Show**
- **Cain's Hundred**
- **Car 54, Where Are You?**
- **David Brinkley's Journal**
- **The Dick Powell Show**
- **Dr. Kildare**
- **The DuPont Show of the Week**
- **Hazel**
- **Here and Now**
- **International Showtime** *
- **NBC Saturday Night at the Movies**
- **Theatre '62**

Not returning from 1960–61:

- Acapulco
- The Americans
- The Art Carney Special
- The Barbara Stanwyck Show
- Bat Masterson
- The Campaign and the Candidates
- The Chevy Mystery Show
- Concentration
- Dan Raven
- Dante
- The Deputy
- The Dinah Shore Chevy Show
- Five Star Jubilee
- The Ford Show
- Great Ghost Tales
- The Groucho Show
- Happy
- It Could Be You
- Jackpot Bowling starring Milton Berle
- Klondike
- The Man from Interpol
- Michael Shayne
- The Nation's Future
- Omnibus
- One Happy Family
- Peter Loves Mary
- Riverboat
- Shirley Temple's Storybook
- The Tab Hunter Show
- The Tall Man
- This Is Your Life
- The Westerner
- Westinghouse Playhouse Starring Nanette Fabray and Wendell Corey
- Westinghouse Preview Theatre

Note: The * indicates that the program was introduced in midseason.
