= 1960–61 United States network television schedule =

The following is the 1960–61 network television schedule for the three major English language commercial broadcast networks in the United States. The schedule covers primetime hours from September 1960 through March 1961. The schedule is followed by a list per network of returning series, new series, and series cancelled after the 1959–60 season.

New fall series are highlighted in bold. All times are Eastern and Pacific.

Each of the 30 highest-rated shows is listed with its rank and rating as determined by Nielsen Media Research.

Yellow indicates the programs in the top 10 for the season.
Cyan indicates the programs in the top 20 for the season.
Magenta indicates the programs in the top 30 for the season.

== Sunday ==
Network		7:00 PM	7:30 PM	8:00 PM	8:30 PM	9:00 PM	9:30 PM	10:00 PM	10:30 PM
ABC	Fall	Walt Disney Presents (started at 6:30)	Maverick		The Lawman (26/22.3)	The Rebel	**The Islanders**		**Winston Churchill: The Valiant Years**
ABC	Spring	Walt Disney Presents (started at 6:30)	Maverick		The Lawman (26/22.3)	The Rebel	**The Asphalt Jungle**		**Winston Churchill: The Valiant Years**
CBS		Lassie	Dennis the Menace (11/26.1)	The Ed Sullivan Show (15/25.0)		General Electric Theater (20/23.4)	The Jack Benny Show (10/26.2)	Candid Camera (7/27.3)	What's My Line? (22/23.1)
NBC	Fall	The Shirley Temple Show (In COLOR)		**National Velvet**	**The Tab Hunter Show**	The Dinah Shore Chevy Show (In COLOR)		The Loretta Young Show	This Is Your Life
NBC	Summer	The Shirley Temple Show (In COLOR)		**National Velvet**	**The Tab Hunter Show**	The Chevy Mystery Show (In COLOR)		The Loretta Young Show	This Is Your Life

Note: ABC aired the interim The Walter Winchell Show at 10:30 p.m. from early October until early November.

== Monday ==
Network		7:00 PM	7:30 PM	8:00 PM	8:30 PM	9:00 PM	9:30 PM	10:00 PM	10:30 PM
ABC		Local	Cheyenne (28/22.0) / Sugarfoot / Bronco		**Surfside 6**		Adventures in Paradise		Peter Gunn (29/21.9)
CBS	Fall	Local (7:00) / Douglas Edwards with the News (7:15)	To Tell the Truth	**Pete and Gladys**	**Bringing Up Buddy**	The Danny Thomas Show (12/25.9)	**The Andy Griffith Show** (4/27.8)	Hennesey	Presidential Countdown
CBS	November	Local (7:00) / Douglas Edwards with the News (7:15)	To Tell the Truth	**Pete and Gladys**	**Bringing Up Buddy**	The Danny Thomas Show (12/25.9)	**The Andy Griffith Show** (4/27.8)	Hennesey	Face the Nation
CBS	Summer	Local (7:00) / Douglas Edwards with the News (7:15)	To Tell the Truth	**Pete and Gladys**	**Bringing Up Buddy**	The Danny Thomas Show (12/25.9)	**The Andy Griffith Show** (4/27.8)	**Glenn Miller Time**	Brenner
CBS	Follow-up	Local (7:00) / Douglas Edwards with the News (7:15)	To Tell the Truth	**Pete and Gladys**	**Bringing Up Buddy**	The Danny Thomas Show (12/25.9)	The Ann Sothern Show	**Glenn Miller Time**	Brenner
NBC	Fall	Local (7:00) / Huntley-Brinkley Report (7:15)	Riverboat		Tales of Wells Fargo	**Klondike**	**Dante**	**The Barbara Stanwyck Show**	Jackpot Bowling starring Milton Berle (In COLOR)
NBC	Winter	Local (7:00) / Huntley-Brinkley Report (7:15)	**The Americans**		Tales of Wells Fargo	**Acapulco**	**Dante**	**The Barbara Stanwyck Show**	Jackpot Bowling starring Milton Berle (In COLOR)
NBC	Spring	Local (7:00) / Huntley-Brinkley Report (7:15)	**The Americans**		Tales of Wells Fargo	**Whispering Smith**	Concentration	**The Barbara Stanwyck Show**	Jackpot Bowling starring Milton Berle (In COLOR)

Notes: On CBS, Presidential Countdown aired as an interim series, 10:30–11 p.m. in September and October until the November 8th election. In some areas, Douglas Edwards with the News and The Huntley-Brinkley Report aired at 6:45 p.m. Peter Gunn moved from NBC to ABC in the fall of 1960. The episodes of Brenner that ran on CBS in the summer of 1961 consisted of two previously unaired episodes produced in 1959 and reruns of episodes broadcast during the summer of 1959.

== Tuesday ==
Network		7:00 PM	7:30 PM	8:00 PM	8:30 PM	9:00 PM	9:30 PM	10:00 PM	10:30 PM
ABC		**Expedition!**	**The Bugs Bunny Show**	The Rifleman (27/22.1)	The Life and Legend of Wyatt Earp	**Stagecoach West**		Alcoa Presents: One Step Beyond	Local
CBS	Fall	Local (7:00) / Douglas Edwards with the News (7:15)	Local	Father Knows Best (repeats)	The Many Loves of Dobie Gillis (23/23.0)	**The Tom Ewell Show**	The Red Skelton Show (19/24.0) (Occasionally in COLOR)	The Garry Moore Show (25/22.7)	
CBS	Summer	Local (7:00) / Douglas Edwards with the News (7:15)	Local	Father Knows Best (repeats)	The Many Loves of Dobie Gillis (23/23.0)	Comedy Spotlight	Playhouse 90 (repeats)		
NBC		Local (7:00) / Huntley-Brinkley Report (7:15)	Laramie		Alfred Hitchcock Presents	**Thriller**		Specials (Most in COLOR)	

NOTES: This is the first broadcast of The Bugs Bunny Show.

On CBS, Comedy Spotlight consisted of reruns of episodes of General Electric Theater.

== Wednesday ==
Network		7:00 PM	7:30 PM	8:00 PM	8:30 PM	9:00 PM	9:30 PM	10:00 PM	10:30 PM
ABC		Local	**Hong Kong**		The Adventures of Ozzie and Harriet	Hawaiian Eye		**Naked City**	
CBS	Fall	Local (7:00) / Douglas Edwards with the News (7:15)	**The Aquanauts**		Wanted Dead or Alive	**My Sister Eileen**	I've Got a Secret	Armstrong Circle Theatre / The United States Steel Hour	
CBS	Spring	Local (7:00) / Douglas Edwards with the News (7:15)	**The Aquanauts**		**Danger Man**	**Angel**	I've Got a Secret	Armstrong Circle Theatre / The United States Steel Hour	
NBC	Fall	Local (7:00) / Huntley-Brinkley Report (7:15)	Wagon Train (2/34.2)		The Price Is Right (8/27.0) (Tied with The Untouchables) (In COLOR)	Perry Como's Kraft Music Hall (In COLOR)		**Peter Loves Mary**	Local
NBC	Summer	Local (7:00) / Huntley-Brinkley Report (7:15)	Wagon Train (2/34.2)		The Price Is Right (8/27.0) (Tied with The Untouchables) (In COLOR)	Perry Como's Kraft Music Hall (In COLOR)		It Could Be You	Local

== Thursday ==
Network		7:00 PM	7:30 PM	8:00 PM	8:30 PM	9:00 PM	9:30 PM	10:00 PM	10:30 PM
ABC		Local	**Guestward, Ho!**	The Donna Reed Show	The Real McCoys (5/27.7)	**My Three Sons** (13/25.8) (Tied with 77 Sunset Strip)	The Untouchables (8/27.0) (Tied with The Price Is Right)		Take A Good Look
CBS	Fall	Local (7:00) / Douglas Edwards with the News (7:15)	**The Witness**		Dick Powell's Zane Grey Theatre	**Angel**	The Ann Sothern Show	Person to Person	The DuPont Show with June Allyson
CBS	Follow-up	Local (7:00) / Douglas Edwards with the News (7:15)	The Ann Sothern Show	**Angel**	Dick Powell's Zane Grey Theatre	**The Witness**		Person to Person	The DuPont Show with June Allyson
CBS	Winter	Local (7:00) / Douglas Edwards with the News (7:15)	The Ann Sothern Show	**Angel**	Dick Powell's Zane Grey Theatre	**Gunslinger**		Person to Person	The DuPont Show with June Allyson
CBS	Summer	Local (7:00) / Douglas Edwards with the News (7:15)	**Summer Sports Spectacular**		Dick Powell's Zane Grey Theatre	**Gunslinger**		Face the Nation and CBS Reports	
NBC	Fall	Local (7:00) / Huntley-Brinkley Report (7:15)	**Outlaws**		Bat Masterson	Bachelor Father	The Ford Show (24/22.9) (In COLOR)	**The Groucho Show*** (Sporadically in COLOR)	Local
NBC	Summer	Local (7:00) / Huntley-Brinkley Report (7:15)	**Outlaws**		Bat Masterson	Bachelor Father	**Great Ghost Tales** (In COLOR)	**The Groucho Show*** (Sporadically in COLOR)	Local

* formerly You Bet Your Life

== Friday ==
Network		7:00 PM	7:30 PM	8:00 PM	8:30 PM	9:00 PM	9:30 PM	10:00 PM	10:30 PM
ABC		Local	Matty's Funday Funnies	**Harrigan and Son**	**The Flintstones** (18/24.3)	77 Sunset Strip (13/25.8) (Tied with My Three Sons)		The Detectives Starring Robert Taylor	**The Law and Mr. Jones**
CBS	Fall	Local (7:00) / Douglas Edwards with the News (7:15)	Rawhide (6/27.5)		**Route 66** (30/21.7)		**Mr. Garlund**	The Twilight Zone	**Eyewitness to History**
CBS	Winter	Local (7:00) / Douglas Edwards with the News (7:15)	Rawhide (6/27.5)		**Route 66** (30/21.7)		**The Jackie Gleason Show**	The Twilight Zone	**Eyewitness to History**
CBS	Spring	Local (7:00) / Douglas Edwards with the News (7:15)	Rawhide (6/27.5)		**Route 66** (30/21.7)		**'Way Out**	The Twilight Zone	**Eyewitness to History**
NBC	Fall	Local (7:00) / Huntley-Brinkley Report (7:15)	**Dan Raven**		**The Westerner**	The Bell Telephone Hour (In COLOR) / NBC News Specials (alternating)		**Michael Shayne**	
NBC	Winter	Local (7:00) / Huntley-Brinkley Report (7:15)	**Happy**	**One Happy Family**	**Westinghouse Playhouse Starring Nanette Fabray and Wendell Corey**	The Bell Telephone Hour / **Sing Along with Mitch** (alternating) (Both programs in COLOR)		**Michael Shayne**	
NBC	May	Local (7:00) / Huntley-Brinkley Report (7:15)	**Happy**	**Five Star Jubilee** (In COLOR)	**Westinghouse Playhouse Starring Nanette Fabray and Wendell Corey**	The Bell Telephone Hour / **Sing Along with Mitch** (alternating) (Both programs in COLOR)		**Michael Shayne**	
NBC	Summer	Local (7:00) / Huntley-Brinkley Report (7:15)	**Happy**	**One Happy Family**	**Five Star Jubilee** (In COLOR)	The Lawless Years	**Westinghouse Playhouse Starring Nanette Fabray and Wendell Corey**	**Michael Shayne**	
NBC	Follow-up	Local (7:00) / Huntley-Brinkley Report (7:15)	**Happy**	**One Happy Family**	**Five Star Jubilee** (In COLOR)	The Lawless Years	**Westinghouse Preview Theatre**	**Michael Shayne**	

== Saturday ==
Network		7:30 PM	8:00 PM	8:30 PM	9:00 PM	9:30 PM	10:00 PM	10:30 PM
ABC		**The Roaring 20s**		Leave It to Beaver	The Lawrence Welk Show		**The Fight of the Week** (10:00) / **Make That Spare** (10:45)	
CBS		Perry Mason (16/24.9)		**Checkmate** (21/23.2)		Have Gun – Will Travel (3/30.9)	Gunsmoke (1/37.3)	Local
NBC	Fall	Bonanza (17/24.8) (In COLOR)		**The Tall Man**	The Deputy	**The Campaign and the Candidates**		Man from Interpol
NBC	November	Bonanza (17/24.8) (In COLOR)		**The Tall Man**	The Deputy	**The Nation's Future**		Local

Note: On NBC, The Campaign and the Candidates aired as an interim series, 9:30–10:30 p.m., from mid-September until the November 8 election.

== By network ==
=== ABC ===
**Returning Series**

- 77 Sunset Strip
- The Adventures of Ozzie and Harriet
- Adventures in Paradise
- Alcoa Presents: One Step Beyond
- Bronco
- Cheyenne
- The Detectives Starring Robert Taylor
- The Donna Reed Show
- Hawaiian Eye
- Lawman
- The Lawrence Welk Show
- Leave It to Beaver
- The Life and Legend of Wyatt Earp
- Matty's Funday Funnies
- Maverick
- Peter Gunn (moved from NBC)
- The Real McCoys
- The Rebel
- The Rifleman
- Sugarfoot
- Take a Good Look
- The Untouchables
- Walt Disney Presents

**New Series**

- **The Asphalt Jungle** *
- **The Bugs Bunny Show**
- **Expedition!**
- **The Fight of the Week**
- **The Flintstones**
- **Guestward, Ho!**
- **Harrigan and Son**
- **Hong Kong**
- **The Islanders**
- **The Law and Mr. Jones**
- **Make That Spare**
- **My Three Sons**
- **Naked City**
- **The Roaring 20's**
- **Stagecoach West**
- **Sugarfoot**
- **Surfside 6**
- **Winston Churchill: The Valiant Years**

Not returning from 1959–60:

- The Alaskans
- Black Saddle
- Bourbon Street Beat
- Broken Arrow
- Charley Weaver's Hobby Lobby
- Colt .45
- Dick Clark's Saturday Night Beach-Nut Show
- Dick Clark's World of Talent
- The Gale Storm Show
- The Jeannie Carson Show
- John Gunther's High Road
- Johnny Staccato
- Music for a Spring Night
- Music for a Summer Night
- Jubilee USA
- Keep Talking
- The Man from Blackhawk
- Man with a Camera
- The Pat Boone Chevy Showroom
- Philip Marlowe
- The Wednesday Night Fights

=== CBS ===
**Returning Series**

- The Ann Sothern Show
- The Armstrong Circle Theatre
- Brenner
- Candid Camera
- CBS Reports
- Comedy Spotlight (previously The Comedy Spot)
- The Danny Thomas Show
- Dennis the Menace
- Dick Powell's Zane Grey Theater
- Douglas Edwards with the News
- The DuPont Show with June Allyson
- The Ed Sullivan Show
- Face the Nation
- Frontier Justice
- The Garry Moore Show
- General Electric Theatre
- Gunsmoke
- Have Gun — Will Travel
- Hennesey
- I've Got a Secret
- The Jack Benny Show
- Lassie
- The Many Loves of Dobie Gillis
- Perry Mason
- Person to Person
- Rawhide
- The Red Skelton Show
- The Spike Jones Show
- To Tell the Truth
- The Twentieth Century
- The Twilight Zone
- The United States Steel Hour
- Wanted Dead or Alive
- What's My Line

**New Series**

- **Angel**
- **The Aquanauts**
- **Bringing Up Buddy**
- **Danger Man**
- **The Andy Griffith Show**
- **Eyewitness to History**
- **Glenn Miller Time**
- **Gunslinger** *
- **Holiday Lodge** *
- **The Jackie Gleason Show**
- **Mr. Garlund**
- **My Sister Eileen**
- **Route 66**
- **Summer Sports Spectacular** *
- **The Tom Ewell Show**
- **'Way Out**
- **The Witness**

Not returning from 1959–60:

- Be Our Guest
- The Betty Hutton Show
- The Big Party
- Buick-Electra Playhouse
- The Dennis O'Keefe Show
- Diagnosis: Unknown
- Father Knows Best
- The George Gobel Show
- Hotel de Paree
- The Invisible Man
- Johnny Ringo
- The Kate Smith Show
- The Lineup
- Lucy in Connecticut
- Markham
- Masquerade Party
- Men into Space
- The Millionaire
- New Comedy Showcase
- Peck's Bad Girl
- Playhouse 90
- The Revlon Revue
- The Robert Herridge Theatre
- The Texan
- Tightrope!

=== NBC ===
**Returning Series**

- Alfred Hitchcock Presents (moved from CBS)
- The Art Carney Special
- Bachelor Father
- Bat Masterson
- The Bell Telephone Hour
- Bonanza
- The Chevy Mystery Show
- Concentration
- The Deputy
- The Dinah Shore Chevy Show
- Five Star Jubilee
- The Ford Show
- The Groucho Show
- Happy
- The Huntley–Brinkley Report
- It Could Be You
- Jackpot Bowling starring Milton Berle
- Laramie
- The Lawless Years
- The Loretta Young Show
- The Man from Interpol
- NBC News Specials
- One Happy Family
- Perry Como's Kraft Music Hall
- The Price Is Right
- Riverboat
- Shirley Temple's Storybook
- Tales of Wells Fargo
- This Is Your Life
- Wagon Train
- Westinghouse Playhouse Starring Nanette Fabray and Wendell Corey

**New Series**

- **Acapulco** *
- **The Americans** *
- **The Barbara Stanwyck Show**
- **The Campaign and the Candidates** *
- **Dan Raven**
- **Dante**
- **Five Star Jubilee** *
- **Great Ghost Tales**
- **The Groucho Show**
- **Happy** *
- **Klondike**
- **Michael Shayne**
- **The Nation's Future** *
- **National Velvet**
- **One Happy Family** *
- **Outlaws**
- **Peter Loves Mary**
- **Sing Along with Mitch** *
- **The Tab Hunter Show**
- **Tales of Wells Fargo** *
- **The Tall Man**
- **Thriller**
- **Westinghouse Playhouse Starring Nanette Fabray and Wendell Corey***
- **Westinghouse Preview Theatre** *
- **Whispering Smith** *

Not returning from 1959–60:

- The Arthur Murray Party
- Fibber McGee and Molly
- Five Fingers
- Gas Company Playhouse
- Gillette Cavalcade of Sports
- Law of the Plainsman
- Love and Marriage
- M Squad
- The Man and the Challenge
- Music on Ice
- NBC Playhouse
- NBC Sunday Showcase
- Omnibus
- Overland Trail
- People Are Funny
- Richard Diamond, Private Detective
- Startime
- The Steve Allen Plymouth Show
- Tate
- The Troubleshooters
- Wichita Town
- Wrangler

Note: The * indicates that the program was introduced in midseason.

== Trivia ==
=== Effects of the WGA strike ===
Between January and June 1960, the 1960 Writers Guild of America strike took place, affecting the fall schedule. The networks had numerous holes, which were mostly filled with unscripted material, some of which included political programs in anticipation of the forthcoming 1960 United States presidential election. CBS gave the unprecedented step of showing episodes from previous seasons of popular series. Some timeslots however (particularly that of 10:30-11) were ceded to stations.

=== Critical response ===
A year-end review by Time described the season as the "worst in the 13-year history of U.S. network television." "Described by a New York critic as a surrealistic mishmash of 'Eliot Ness, Together Ness and Pointless Ness,' the season was one of unhappy comedy and unhealthy violence, of defections, dismissals and dismay."

=== "Vast wasteland" speech ===
On May 9, 1961, at the annual convention of the National Association of Broadcasters new Federal Communications Commission chairman Newton Minow delivered "Television and the Public Interest," a scathing speech directed at the "procession of game shows, violence, audience participation shows, formula comedies about totally unbelievable families, blood and thunder, mayhem, violence, sadism, murder, Western badmen, Western goodmen, private eyes, gangsters, more violence, and cartoons, and, endlessly, commercials, many screaming, cajoling, and offending, and, most of all, boredom [...] Is there one network president in this room who claims he can't do better?" Minow called TV a "vast wasteland"; the phrase was picked up by the press and resulted in bad publicity for the networks and for the television industry as a whole. According to television historians Castleman and Podrazik (1982), the networks were in a bind, though: they had already purchased their fall 1961 programs and had locked in their 1961–62 schedules. "The best the networks could do was slot a few more public affairs shows, paint rosy pictures for 1962–63, and prepare to endure the barrage of criticism they felt certain would greet the new season."
