= Top-rated United States television programs of 1961–62 =

This table displays the top-rated primetime television series of the 1961–62 season as measured by Nielsen Media Research.

Rank	Program	Network	Rating
1	Wagon Train	NBC	32.1
2	Bonanza	NBC	30.0
3	Gunsmoke	CBS	28.3
4	Hazel	NBC	27.7
5	Perry Mason	CBS	27.3
6	The Red Skelton Show	CBS	27.1
7	The Andy Griffith Show	CBS	27.0
8	The Danny Thomas Show	CBS	26.1
9	Dr. Kildare	NBC	25.6
10	Candid Camera	CBS	25.5
11	My Three Sons	ABC	24.7
12	The Garry Moore Show	CBS	24.6
13	Rawhide	CBS	24.5
14	The Real McCoys	ABC	24.2
15	Lassie	CBS	24.0
15	Sing Along with Mitch	NBC	24.0
17	Dennis the Menace	CBS	23.8
18	Ben Casey	ABC	23.7
19	The Ed Sullivan Show	CBS	23.5
20	Car 54, Where Are You?	NBC	23.2
21	The Flintstones	ABC	22.9
21	The Many Loves of Dobie Gillis	CBS	22.9
23	Walt Disney's Wonderful World of Color	NBC	22.7
24	The Joey Bishop Show	NBC	22.6
25	The Perry Como Show	NBC	22.5
26	The Defenders	CBS	22.4
27	The Price Is Right	NBC	22.3
27	The Rifleman	ABC	22.3
29	Have Gun – Will Travel	CBS	22.2
30	The Donna Reed Show	ABC	21.9
30	77 Sunset Strip	ABC	21.9
