= Top-rated United States television programs of 1962–63 =

This table displays the top-rated primetime television series of the 1962–63 season as measured by Nielsen Media Research.

Rank	Program	Network	Rating
1	The Beverly Hillbillies	CBS	36.0
2	Candid Camera	CBS	31.1
2	The Red Skelton Show	CBS	31.1
4	Bonanza	NBC	29.8
4	The Lucy Show	CBS	29.8
6	The Andy Griffith Show	CBS	29.7
7	Ben Casey	ABC	28.7
7	The Danny Thomas Show	CBS	28.7
9	The Dick Van Dyke Show	CBS	27.1
10	Gunsmoke	CBS	27.0
11	Dr. Kildare	NBC	26.2
11	The Jack Benny Show	CBS	26.2
13	What's My Line?	CBS	25.5
14	The Ed Sullivan Show	CBS	25.3
15	Hazel	NBC	25.1
16	I've Got a Secret	CBS	24.9
17	The Jackie Gleason Show	CBS	24.1
18	The Defenders	CBS	23.9
19	The Garry Moore Show	CBS	23.3
19	To Tell the Truth	CBS	23.3
19	Lassie	CBS	23.3
22	Rawhide	CBS	22.8
23	Perry Mason	CBS	22.4
24	Walt Disney's Wonderful World of Color	NBC	22.3
25	Wagon Train	ABC	22.0
26	The Virginian	NBC	21.7
27	Route 66	CBS	21.3
28	My Three Sons	ABC	21.0
29	Have Gun – Will Travel	CBS	20.8
30	The Flintstones	ABC	20.5
