= Top-rated United States television programs of 1960–61 =

This table displays the top-rated primetime television series of the 1960–61 season as measured by Nielsen Media Research.

Rank	Program	Network	Rating
1	Gunsmoke	CBS	37.3
2	Wagon Train	NBC	34.2
3	Have Gun – Will Travel	CBS	30.9
4	The Andy Griffith Show	CBS	27.8
5	The Real McCoys	ABC	27.7
6	Rawhide	CBS	27.5
7	Candid Camera	CBS	27.3
8	The Untouchables	ABC	27.0
8	The Price Is Right	NBC	27.0
10	The Jack Benny Show	CBS	26.2
11	Dennis the Menace	CBS	26.1
12	The Danny Thomas Show	CBS	25.9
13	My Three Sons	ABC	25.8
13	77 Sunset Strip	ABC	25.8
15	The Ed Sullivan Show	CBS	25.0
16	Perry Mason	CBS	24.9
17	Bonanza	NBC	24.8
18	The Flintstones	ABC	24.3
19	The Red Skelton Show	CBS	24.0
20	General Electric Theater	CBS	23.4
21	Checkmate	CBS	23.2
22	What's My Line?	CBS	23.1
23	The Many Loves of Dobie Gillis	CBS	23.0
24	The Ford Show	NBC	22.9
25	The Garry Moore Show	CBS	22.7
26	The Lawman	ABC	22.3
27	The Rifleman	ABC	22.1
28	Cheyenne	ABC	22.0
29	Peter Gunn	NBC	21.9
30	Route 66	CBS	21.7
