= Expedition! =

- Genre: Travel documentary Popular science
- Presented by: John D. Craig
- Composer: Fred Steiner
- No. of seasons: 2
- No. of episodes: 48

Production
- Running time: 30 minutes
- Production companies: Insight, Inc.

Original release
- Network: ABC
- Release: September 20, 1960 – April 23, 1962

Expedition! is an American travel documentary television series that was broadcast in the United States on ABC Tuesday nights in the 1960–61 television season and Monday nights in the 1961–62 television season.

== Summary ==
Producer John D. Craig hosted episodes that documented journeys to various remote regions of the world, looking for such unusual things as Abominable Snowmen, African bushmen, unfriendly jungle tribes in Brazil, ruined cities of antiquity, and strange animals in their natural habitat. Episodes varied, but all focused on geological, geophysical, biological, anthropological, or archaeological themes.

== Production details ==
The show was sponsored by Ralston Purina, and was broadcast on the ABC television network 7–7:30 pm on Tuesday nights in its first season and on Monday nights in its second season. The first program was broadcast September 20, 1960; the last show was broadcast April 27, 1962. Every third week was devoted to local affiliate versions of the show. The show received a Thomas Alva Edison award for science education, an Ohio State award for broadcast journalism, and a 1961 Peabody Award for Television Excellence.

Fred Steiner, a well-known composer of music for television shows from the 1950s through the 1990s, composed the background music for many of the episodes.

== First season ==
Twenty-seven episodes were produced and broadcast in the 1960-61 television season.

The Frozen Continent

Broadcast September 20, 1960, this episode presented geophysical information about the South Pole region, along with documentation of winter life in Antarctica. The actual expedition was the scientific exploration of Antarctica under the aegis of the International Geophysical Year (IGY), running from June 1957 through December 1958.

Operation Noah's Ark

Broadcast September 27, 1960, this episode was based on the book of the same name, published earlier that year, by Charles Lagus, on his work as cameraman for David Attenborough during the late 1950s when Attenborough hosted and narrated the seminal BBC nature documentary series Zoo Quest. The subject was the evacuation of African wildlife from jungleland about to be flooded due to construction of a dam.

Journey to the Roof of the World

Broadcast October 11, 1960, this episode was about Tibet.

Men Against the Mountains

Broadcast October 18, 1960, this episode was about the dangers of mountain climbing, focusing on the deaths of climbers on Mont Blanc, the Matterhorn, and Jungfrau in the European Alps.

3000 Years Under the Sea

Broadcast November 1, 1960, this episode focused on a search for a ship that sank off the coast of Turkey thousands of years ago. The expedition, in 1959, and organized by Sam Waterman was the first-ever underwater archaeological expedition to Asia Minor to film a Bronze Age shipwreck.

Weavers of Death

Broadcast between November 08, 1960 - December 31, 1960, this episode, based on the book of the same name, focused on the everyday lives and customs of the Bedouin. This episode was set for broadcast November 08, 1960 but was pre-empted by election coverage and likely aired December 31, 1960 but this is unconfirmed.

Land of the Dying Ghosts

Broadcast November 22, 1960, this episode was about Greenland, and the struggle to find food and survive.

Lost Kingdoms of Arabia

Broadcast November 29, 1960, this episode documented the unearthing of Timna, the capital city of the pre-Christian kingdom of Qataban, by an expedition researching the ancient spice caravan routes of Southern Arabia. This expedition to Yemen, led by Wendell Phillips of the American Foundation for the Study of Man (AFSM), and running from 1950-1952, was the first major archaeological trek to the area in modern times.

Survivors of the Ice Age

Broadcast December 13, 1960, this episode focused on the musk ox.

Last of the Arctic Nomads

Broadcast December 20, 1960, this episode focused on the reindeer herders of Lapland.

War Clubs of the Amazon

Broadcast January 03, 1961, this episode was based on the NATIONAL GEOGRAPHIC article of the same name about warrior tribes living deep in the jungles along the Amazon River in Brazil.

Vanishing Muskox

This episode was broadcast January 10, 1961, and focused on efforts to preserve the muskox as a viable species.

Lost World of the Kalahari

Broadcast January 24, 1961, this episode was a summarization of the six-hour BBC-TV series of the same name, which had been based on the book of the same name by Laurens van der Post, about the San natives of south-central Africa.

Last of the Bushmen

This episode was broadcast January 31, 1961.

Saga of the Triton

This episode was broadcast February 14, 1961, and covered Operation Sandblast: the underwater circumnavigation of the globe by the US Navy first-generation nuclear-powered submarine USS Triton (SSRN-586), starting February 24, 1960, and ending April 25, 1960. The trip covered 26,723 nautical miles (49,491 km) in 60 days and 21 hours, crossing the Equator on four different occasions. This episode featured film footage from Operation Sandblast with voice-over narration extracted from the ship's logbook written by Captain Edward L. Beach Jr., the commanding officer of the Triton.

Man's First Winter at the South Pole

Broadcast between February 21, 1961, this episode was based on the National Geographic article of the same name in the April, 1958 issue about International Geophysical Year research in Antarctica.

Death Rites of the Camayura

This episode was broadcast March 7, 1961, and documented the death rites of the Camayura Indians, a tribe living a Stone Age life on Brazil's Upper Xingu River.

Russian Whale Hunt

This episode was broadcast March 14, 1961.

Moon Temple of Sheba

Broadcast March 28, 1961, this episode presented more material from the expedition that had been the basis of the "Lost Kingdoms of Arabia" episode above.

Invisible World of the Deep

This episode was broadcast April 04, 1961.

Orinoco Quest

This episode was broadcast April 18, 1961.

Cliff Dwellers of the Arctic

This episode was broadcast April 25, 1961, and documents the lives of the Aseuluk, a small tribe of Inupiat who inhabit King Island in the Behring Strait off the coast of western Alaska.

World of the Penguins

Broadcast May 09, 1961, this episode covered the expeditions of Dr. William Slater, who filmed and studied the life cycle of the penguins in the Falklands. Besides showing the life and struggle of individual penguins, he also showed the answer to the question of how the penguins identify their own chicks in a large group.

Return to the Stone Age

This episode was broadcast May 16, 1961.

Flight to the Giants

This episode was broadcast May 30, 1961.

Conquest of Dhaulagiri Part I

This episode was broadcast June 06, 1961, and documented leader Max Eiselin and his Swiss team in their successful mountaineering climb in 1960 of the Himalayan peak Dhaulagiri, at that time the highest unclimbed mountain in the world.

Conquest of Dhaulagiri Part II

This episode was broadcast June 20, 1961, and continued the story of leader Max Eiselin and his Swiss team in their successful mountaineering climb in 1960 of the Himalayan peak Dhaulagiri, at that time the highest unclimbed mountain in the world.

== Second season ==
Twenty-two episodes were produced and broadcast in the 1961-62 television season.

Africa's Animal Kingdom

This episode was broadcast September 18, 1961, and contained footage of elephants, lions, giraffes, hippos, crocodiles, white rhino, impala, zebras, springbok, and many more animals native to Africa.

Water People of Burma

This episode was broadcast September 25, 1961, and documented the nomadic lives of the Moken people who live their entire lives on small thatch-covered wooden boats that travel along the coasts of Burma and Thailand.

Sacred Well of Sacrifice

This episode was broadcast October 9, 1961, and documented research being done at the Mayan ruins containing the Sacred Cenote at Chichen Itza, Mexico.

Treasure of the Sacred Well

This episode was broadcast October 16, 1961, and continued the previous week's episode coverage of the research being done at Mayan ruins.

Russian Assault On the Antarctic

This episode was broadcast October 30, 1961.

Rivers of Fire and Ice

This episode was broadcast November 6, 1961.

Valley of Shangri-La

This episode, broadcast November 20, 1961, explored a hidden valley in the Himalayas that likely inspired James Hilton's Lost Horizon.

Menace of the Moving Glacier

This episode, broadcast November 27, 1961, was a continuation of the previous week's episode on the true story of the valley of Shangri-La.

Insect Safari

This episode was broadcast December 4, 1961.

Black Jungle Trial (Trail?)

This episode was broadcast December 11, 1961.

Valley of the Shadow of Death

This episode was broadcast December 18, 1961.

Weavers of Death

This episode was broadcast between December 31, 1961, and April 27, 1962.

Shark Island

This episode was broadcast between December 31, 1961, and April 27, 1962.

Journey to the Lost World

This episode, broadcast between December 31, 1961, and April 27, 1962, focused on a South American cave exploration led by Stanley Jeeves in the British colony British Guiana (now known as the independent nation of Guyana), on the Caribbean coast of South America. The expedition was later documented in a 1965 book of the same name by Jeeves.

Saga of Sea Dragon / Under the Ice

This episode, broadcast between December 31, 1961, and April 27, 1962, documented the voyage of the USS Seadragon, a nuclear-powered US Navy submarine on its underwater traverse of the Arctic ice cap. The submarine departed from Portsmouth, New Hampshire on August 1, 1960, and, heading north, traveled from Atlantic to Pacific in two weeks, surfacing at the North Pole midway through the journey.

Land Divers of Pentecost

This episode, broadcast between December 31, 1961, and April 27, 1962, was the first American re-broadcast of an episode of the 1960 BBC television series The People of Paradise, produced and narrated by David Attenborough. The subject was the "land divers" of Pentecost Island of the South Pacific nation of Vanuatu: young men who jumped from tall wooden platforms with vines tied to their ankles as a test of courage, the inspiration for modern-day bungee jumping.

Challenge of the Pamirs, or Challenge of the Seven Peaks

This episode, broadcast between December 31, 1961, and April 27, 1962, documented the 1950s explorations of the Pamir Mountains (also called "The Roof of the World"), a mountain range in central Asia overlapping several countries.

Behind the Walls of Kano

This episode, broadcast between December 31, 1961, and April 27, 1962, documented the ancient history of the city of Kano in Nigeria, which had only just become an independent nation October 1, 1960.

Firewalkers of Fiji

This episode, broadcast between December 31, 1961, and April 27, 1962, was the first American re-broadcast of an episode by the same name of the 1960 BBC television series The People of Paradise, produced and narrated by David Attenborough. The episode documented the legendary firewalkers of Beqa Island, Fiji.

Socotra: Forgotten Island

This episode, broadcast between December 31, 1961, and April 27, 1962, documented the Oxford expeditions, headed by Douglas Botting, into the Yemni island group of Socotra in the Indian Ocean in 1956.

Cliffs of the Dead

This episode, broadcast between December 31, 1961, and April 27, 1962, documented burial practices in Sagada, Philippines, where coffins for the dead of the Kankanaey tribal people are crafted from century-old pine trees, over which death rituals are performed before the coffins are taken to their final resting places, suspended along the local limestone cliffs.

Cargo Cult

This episode, broadcast between December 31, 1961, and April 27, 1962, was the first American re-broadcast of an episode by the same name of the 1960 BBC television series The People of Paradise, produced and narrated by David Attenborough. The subject was the tribal worship called "cargo cult", as practised at Sulphur Bay, Fiji.
