= Benny Paret vs. Emile Griffith III =

1962 boxing match

- Date: March 24, 1962
- Venue: Madison Square Garden, New York City
- Title(s) on the line: NBA/Ring/Lineal Welterweight Championship

Tale of the tape
Boxer	(Cuba) Benny Paret	(United States Virgin Islands) Emile Griffith
Nickname	"Kid"	
Hometown	Santa Clara, Cuba	Saint Thomas, U.S. Virgin Islands
Pre-fight record	35–11–3 (10 KO)	28–3–0 (10 KO)
Height	5 ft 7.5 in (171 cm)	5 ft 7.5 in (171 cm)
Weight	146.25 lb (66 kg)	144 lb (65 kg)
Recognition	NBA/Ring/Lineal; Welterweight Champion	

Result
- Griffith winner by KO, round 12, 2:09

Benny Paret vs. Emile Griffith III was the third meeting between Benny "Kid" Paret and Emile Griffith, for the welterweight boxing championship, held at Madison Square Garden in New York City on Saturday, March 24, 1962. Paret came into the match as the reigning welterweight champion; this would be the deciding rubber match.

The match was broadcast live by ABC on its live weekly boxing sports program, Fight of the Week. The fight was both notable and controversial for the punishment Paret took in the ring at the hands of Griffith which led to his loss by knockout in round 12 of a scheduled 15 rounds. Paret died in the hospital from his injuries 10 days later. The match has been cited as one of the reasons for the decline of boxing as a mainstream televised sport, and led to political calls for bans on boxing bouts.

== Background ==
This fight was the third meeting between Paret and Griffith for the NBA/Ring/Lineal Welterweight title. On April 1, 1961, in his first title defense, Paret was defeated by Griffith in the 13th round by KO. In their second meeting on September 30, 1961, Paret recaptured the Welterweight crown by split decision. Although Paret had been battered in the two fights with Griffith and a December 1961 middleweight fight with Gene Fullmer, he decided that he would defend his welterweight title against Griffith three months after the Fullmer fight. Paret-Griffith III was booked for Madison Square Garden on Saturday, March 24, 1962. With Paret as the reigning champion, Griffith was heavily favored by Vegas oddsmakers as a 2:7 favorite to win and recapture the Welterweight title.

== Weigh-in ==
The morning of the fight, at the customary weigh-in, Paret needled Griffith with an insult in Spanish while Griffith stood on the scales. Contemporary newspaper reports described the exchange without being specific about the insult, but did say that when asked afterward to pose with Paret for photos, that Griffith replied, "I'd better not. I'm liable to swing right now." The insult leveled by Paret was maricón, understood by both boxers to mean "faggot".

Griffith had worked in a women's hat factory, and later designed hats. Griffith would come out as bisexual in his later years, but in 1962 allegations of homosexuality were considered fatal to an athlete's career and a particularly grievous insult in the culture both fighters came from. Griffith was enraged by Paret's taunt at the weigh-in, and it set the tone for the fight that evening.

== Fight ==
In the sixth round Paret came close to stopping Griffith with a multi-punch combination but Griffith was saved by the bell. After the sixth round Griffith's trainer, Gil Clancy, later said he told him, "When you go inside I want you to keep punching until Paret holds you or the referee breaks you! But you keep punching until he does that!".

In the twelfth round of the fight Don Dunphy, who was calling the bout for ABC, remarked, "This is probably the tamest round of the entire fight." Seconds later, Griffith backed Paret into the corner and unleashed a massive flurry of punches to the champion's head. Paret was likely dazed by the initial shots, but at this point still put his gloves up to defend himself. Paret then slumped to the side against the ropes, his head and part of his upper body now out of the ring. Griffith held his opponent's shoulder keeping him in position while using his free hand to hit Paret. As Griffith repeatedly landed right uppercuts on Paret's head, Paret occasionally moved his arms, his head still outside the ring. Referee Ruby Goldstein explained what he was seeing, "From long experience in boxing I have seen on numerous occasions boxers deliberately put their heads a little out of the ring and this sometimes can be used as sort of a means of avoiding getting hit cleanly. Now at the time Griffith was throwing quite a few punches, but Paret seemed to get his hand up and block a number of them and...roll with a couple of them. ...I thought this possibly was his strategy, to roll out of this position and get his head back in the ring. I observed that twice he got his head back into the ring." Slow motion analysis of the fight accounts for 29 unanswered punches thrown by Griffith during the flurry.

Manuel Alfaro, Paret's manager, was criticized for not retiring his boxer with a timely throwing in of the towel at this point in the bout. Alfaro did say that "I screamed for Goldstein to stop it, but apparently he didn't hear me." After twenty-nine consecutive punches by Griffith, Goldstein stepped in, grabbed Griffith from the side, and called a halt to the bout, thereby awarding Griffith a win by technical knockout. Immediately after the referee intervened, Paret, who had remained on his feet throughout, slowly slid to the floor and collapsed in the corner (initially thought to be from exhaustion). Paret's team and Dr. Alexander Schiff of the New York State Athletic Commission surrounded Paret to attend to him. Griffith's team raised his arms with him when victory was announced, though immediately after, Griffith returned to the corner Paret had collapsed in to check on him and was sent away. After a few minutes, Paret was carried from the ring on a stretcher.

Griffith told ABC interviewer Don Dunphy immediately after Paret was carried from the ring, "I'm very proud to be the welterweight champion again, and, I hope Paret is feeling very good which – they will not tell me how he feels." Dunphy then introduced what has in hindsight been cited as the first use of instant replay in United States television history, asking a clearly uncomfortable Griffith to walk through the bout's final seconds with him in detail. After the broadcast ended and the seriousness of the situation became known, Griffith went to the hospital where Paret was being treated and unsuccessfully attempted for several hours to gain entry to Paret's room. Following that he ran through the streets while being insulted by passers-by.

Paret, never having regained consciousness after the fight, died ten days later at Roosevelt Hospital in Manhattan from massive brain hemorrhaging.

== Aftermath ==
Benny Paret vs. Emile Griffith III was the subject of many controversies. It is theorized that one of the reasons Paret died was that he was vulnerable due to the beatings he took in his previous three fights, all of which happened within twelve months of each other. New York State boxing authorities were criticized for giving Paret clearance to fight just several months after the Fullmer fight. The referee Ruby Goldstein, a respected veteran, came under criticism for not stopping the fight sooner. Goldstein explained in a 1964 interview, "I never blamed myself, but some of the people blamed me for not stopping it sooner. Sooner? If the fight were being fought right now, I wouldn't stop it sooner. Paret was a good, durable fighter, who'd look in trouble early in a round, but he'd come back to fire punches and win the round. He was the champion. You give the champion a chance to fight back." It has been argued that Goldstein hesitated because of Paret's reputation of feigning injury and Griffith's reputation as a poor finisher. Another theory is that Goldstein was afraid that Paret's supporters would riot. Goldstein would later reveal that he himself was scarred by the event, having nightmares, severe insomnia, and flashbacks to the fight. Though officially cleared of wrongdoing by the New York State Athletic Commission, Goldstein let his license to referee fights lapse. After later applying for a new license, he would referee only one more fight in his career in March 1964, before retiring permanently.

New York Governor Nelson Rockefeller created a seven-man commission to investigate the incident and the sport. This fight, among others (such as nationally televised Davey Moore vs. Sugar Ramos in March 1963, which caused Moore's death) gradually led to the decline of boxing as a popular televised sport. Ultimately, ABC announced in December 1963 that it would cancel its weekly boxing program, Fight of the Week, in September 1964. Professional boxing would not be televised on a regular basis again after that decline until the 1970s and was only rarely aired in prime time until the following decade, and then not frequently on major networks.

Griffith would later receive hate mail from Paret supporters who were convinced he had intentionally killed Paret. He reportedly felt guilt over Paret's death and suffered nightmares about him for 40 years.

== In popular culture ==
This fight, and the widespread publicity and criticism of boxing which accompanied it, became the basis of the 2005 documentary Ring of Fire: The Emile Griffith Story. At the end of the documentary Griffith who has harbored guilt over the incident over the years is introduced to Paret's son. The son embraces Griffith and tells him he is forgiven.

The bout is a major part of the story in Champion which premiered at Opera Theatre of Saint Louis on 15 June 2013 and made its Metropolitan Opera debut on 10 April 2023.

== Undercard ==
Undercard fights, Benny Paret vs. Emile Griffith III
Winner	Opponent	Result
(Puerto Rico) Taco Gonzalez	(United States) Sid Marcus	MD4
(Puerto Rico) Angelo Soto	(Puerto Rico) Angelo Coloncito	TKO3
(United States) Willie Giles	(United States) Dave Russell	MD6
(United States) Billy Bello	(Puerto Rico) Andy Figueroa	DRAW
