= The Art Linkletter Show =

American TV audience-participation series (1963)

The Art Linkletter Show is an American television audience-participation show that was broadcast on NBC from February 18, 1963, to September 16, 1963.

== Overview ==
A program packager brought the concept for the show to Art Linkletter, and it appealed to him. He said, "In close to 30 years in this business I've discovered people like nothing better than watching other people, wondering what makes them tick and trying to guess what they are apt to do next."

Linkletter was the host of the program, which had a format that was a variation of Candid Camera. Episodes centered around guessing what people would do in amusing situations that were either recorded by hidden cameras or enacted by the show's group of players. Typical situations included:

- Would being told that an atrocious hat came from a famous designer affect a woman's willingness to buy it?
- Could a man with each arm in a sling persuade a stranger to feed ice cream to him?
- When a pet shop's owner was absent, would a customer conduct business with a chimpanzee?

Segments of episodes included "The Last Word", "What Are the Odds?", "What Did She Do?", and "You Be the Judge". Ed Holmes, one of the actors in the hidden-camera segments, said, "People will do almost anything. The more fantastic it is, the easier it is to get them to do something." Other members of the Art Linkletter Players, not all of whom appeared each week, were Ken Berry, Jackie Joseph, Carol Merrill, Yvonne Othon, Don Penny, and Hazel Shermet.

Initially both a celebrity panel and the studio audience tried to predict what would happen, but by April 1963 the audience element had been discontinued and only the celebrity panel did so. Jayne Meadows and Carl Reiner became regulars on the show then. Guest celebrities on the program included Cara Williams, Troy Donahue, and Suzanne Pleshette.

== Production ==
The Art Linkletter Show was broadcast on Mondays from 9:30 to 10 p.m. Eastern Time, replacing The Price Is Right (which was moved to Fridays). It was produced by Artel Productions in association with NBC. The executive producer was Wilbur Stark, with Irvin Atkins as producer and Hal Cooper as director. The show originated from Hollywood. Sponsors included Miles Laboratories, Block Drug Company, Helene Curtis, Polaroid, and Liggett & Myers.

After a hidden-camera sketch was completed, participants were told that they had been tricked and asked if they would allow the segment to be broadcast on the show. Those who agreed received payment and could win prizes if the show's celebrity panel failed to correctly guess how they reacted.
