= Tate (TV series) =

- Created by: Harry Julian Fink
- Directed by: Ida Lupino; Richard Whorf
- Starring: David McLean
- Country of origin: United States
- No. of seasons: 1
- No. of episodes: 13

Production
- Executive producer: Alvin Cooperman
- Producer: Shelley Hull
- Running time: 30 minutes
- Production companies: Roncom Video Films, Inc.

Original release
- Network: NBC
- Release: June 8 – September 14, 1960

Tate is an American Western television series starring David McLean that aired on NBC from June 8 until September 14, 1960, followed by reruns on the 21st and 28th. It was created by Harry Julian Fink (the creator of Dirty Harry and T.H.E. Cat), who wrote most of the scripts, and produced by Perry Como's Roncom Video Films, Inc., as a summer replacement for The Perry Como Show. Richard Whorf guest-starred once on the series and directed the majority of the episodes. Ida Lupino directed two segments.

== Overview ==
David McLean starred as Tate, who lost the use of his left arm during the American Civil War. Because he was injured at the Battle of Vicksburg in Mississippi, Tate's arm is covered in black leather and a glove and supported by a sling. Tate is a widower, but the cause of the death of his wife, Mary, is not specified in the series, although a gunfight seems likely. Tate had left his hometown as a teenager because of such a fight. At the urging of Marshal Morty Taw, whom viewers meet in the pilot episode, "Home Town", Tate arrives to help Taw hang an old childhood friend, played by James Coburn, who has murdered four people.

Tate roams the Old West as a bounty hunter-gunfighter. True to the nature of most hired guns on television Western series, Tate was discriminating as to for whom he worked, and would change sides if he found himself misled by his employers. As a gunman, he is wickedly fast on the draw. He also carries a shotgun, in his words, "to help even the odds." His reputation precedes him, and other men often seek him out in a gunfight...often to their regret. The fact that Tate is physically disabled made him the first handicapped lead character in television history, and paved the way for future programs Ironside with Raymond Burr and Longstreet, starring James Franciscus.

== Background and production ==
Some references cite that Tate was recorded on videotape; at the time, most nonlive programs were shot on film. In fact, the series was filmed, as evidenced by quality of DVD copies of episodes. The misconception seems to come from the name of Como's production company; in this case, the "Video" in Roncom Video Films, Inc. meant they made films for television.

Sponsored by Kraft Foods, Tate was a summer replacement show, filling in for the second half-hour of Perry Como's Kraft Music Hall as part of the Kraft Summer Theater. It aired after another premiering Roncom production, the sitcom Happy with Ronnie Burns. Tate did not develop the popularity in its short run to be extended thereafter as a regular series.

At the time, McLean was already well known as the Marlboro Man, one of the more famous spots in advertising history. McLean died in 1995 of lung cancer, brought on by many years of smoking.

On October 30, 2007, the entire run of 13 episodes was released in a Region One, three-DVD set by Timeless Media Group. Most of the series is in the public domain.

== Guest stars ==
Robert Redford was cast in two episodes some six weeks apart, as John Torsett in "The Bounty Hunter" and as Tad Dundee in "Comanche Scalps", the latter segment with Leonard Nimoy as the Comanche and veteran character actor Lane Bradford as William Essey.

Others cast on Tate were:

- Julie Adams
- Chris Alcaide
- Patricia Breslin
- James Coburn
- Robert Culp
- Royal Dano
- Ted de Corsia
- Louise Fletcher
- Peggy Ann Garner
- Jock Gaynor
- Marianna Hill

- Martin Landau
- Mort Mills
- Gregory Morton
- Warren Oates
- Paul Richards
- Bing Russell
- Robert F. Simon
- Vaughn Taylor
- Warren Vanders
- Peter Whitney
- Don Wilbanks

== Episodes ==
No.	Title	Original release date
1	"Home Town"	June 8, 1960
Tate returns to his hometown to help the local sheriff out of difficulty. Guest stars were James Coburn and Royal Dano.
2	"Stopover"	June 15, 1960
After Tate wins a gunfight with a man considered to be the fastest around, a braggart challenges Tate to a duel.
3	"The Bounty Hunter"	June 22, 1960
A bounty hunter (Robert Culp) is searching for Tate for a murder that he did not commit.
4	"Voices of the Town"	July 6, 1960
In the midst of trying to capture a criminal, Tate is forced to shoot the criminal's wife, which results in the couple's neighbors seeking revenge.
5	"A Lethal Pride"	July 20, 1960
Tate is hired by a Mexican national to avenge an assault on his daughter (Marianna Hill), but a death occurs before justice is served.
6	"Tigrero"	August 3, 1960
Tate is shot in the leg while transporting a killer, John Chess (played by Martin Landau), through a cattle town. A powerful cattle baron's brother is killed, and he hunts Tate and Chess in retaliation.
7	"Comanche Scalps"	August 10, 1960
Tate attempts to convince a man not to kill his brother, but is thwarted by an Indian raiding party.
8	"Before Sunup"	August 17, 1960
While trying to protect a man, Tate finds himself involved in a blazing gunfight.
9	"The Reckoning"	August 24, 1960
Hired to serve justice on a killer, Tate finds a rejected suitor has set off a chain reaction of death and bitterness.
10	"The Gunfighters"	August 31, 1960
Tate is hired by farmers to collect their back pay, and is at the mercy of a hired gunslinger.
11	"Quiet After the Storm"	September 7, 1960
In the midst of bringing a killer to justice, Tate must fend off an angry lynch mob.
12	"The Return of Jessica Jackson"	September 14, 1960
Tate helps rescue a woman who has been held by Indians for the past eight years.
13	"The Mary Hardin Story"	September 21, 1960
A widow engages Tate's services to protect her son and herself from a pair of greedy land grabbers.
