= Roberta Shore =

American actress (born 1943)

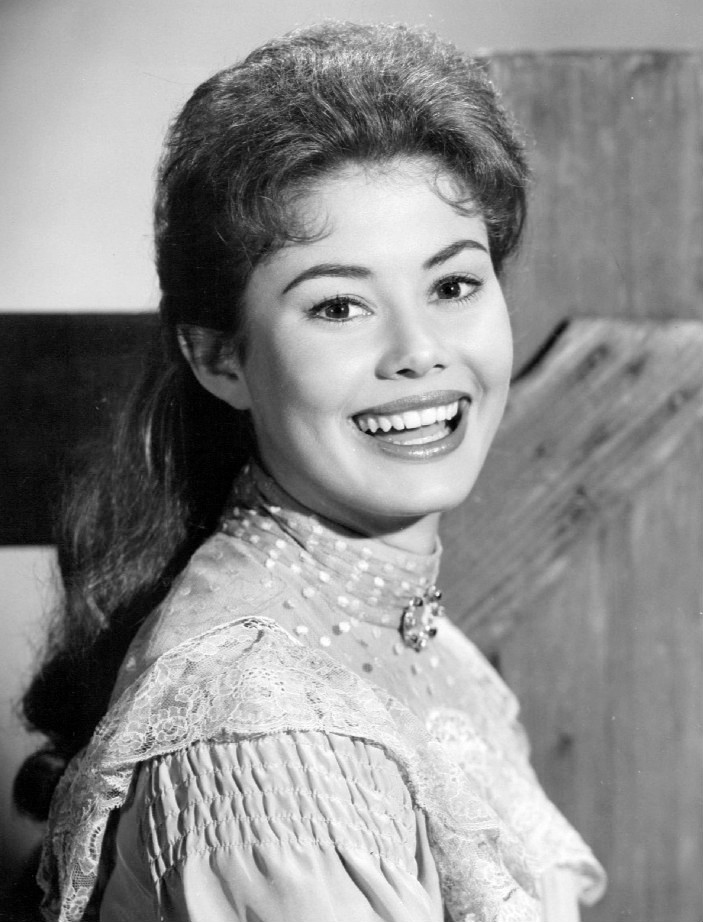
- Roberta Shore as Betsy Garth in The Virginian
- Born: Roberta Jymme Schourup; April 7, 1943 (age 83); Monterey Park, California, U.S.
- Occupation: Actress
- Years active: 1954–1974, 2015
- Spouse(s): Kent Christensen (m. 1964; div. 19??); Terry C. Barber (m. 19??; died 1987); Ron Frederickson (m. ??)
- Children: 2

Roberta Jymme Schourup (born April 7, 1943) better known as Roberta Shore, is an American actress and performer. She is notable for her roles in the original Shaggy Dog film and as Betsy Garth on the Western television series The Virginian. A devout member of the Church of Jesus Christ of Latter-day Saints, Shore broke her contract to focus on her marriage and family, retiring at the age of 22. She lives in Utah.

== Career ==
Shore co-starred in several Walt Disney productions featuring the Mouseketeers, thus came to be associated with them. (She auditioned as a Mouseketeer, but was turned down because she was taller than most of the cast at the time.) She appeared as Annette Funicello's rival Laura Rogan in Annette's self-titled series and as French-speaking Franceska in The Shaggy Dog (1959). In 1964, she voiced a Swiss yodeler for the attraction "it's a small world".

Aside from Disney, Shore had a featured role in the 1959 screen version of Blue Denim, duetting with Warren Berlinger, and an uncredited cameo appearance in A Summer Place as Sandra Dee's gossipy schoolmate Anne Talbert. Later, she played Ricky Summers in the 1960 movie Because They're Young, Jenny Bell in The Young Savages (1961), and in an uncredited role as Lorna in Stanley Kubrick's 1962 version of Lolita.

Shore's television credits include appearances on Playhouse 90, The Adventures of Ozzie and Harriet, The Donna Reed Show, The Lawrence Welk Show (a singing appearance in 1959), The Many Loves of Dobie Gillis, several Western series including Maverick, Wagon Train, The Tall Man, Laramie, and Lawman, and regular roles on Father Knows Best and The New Bob Cummings Show. Most notably, Shore was featured in the first four seasons of The Virginian as Betsy Garth, the daughter of Shiloh Ranch owner Judge Garth, played by Lee J. Cobb.

At the age of 22, Shore broke her contract to focus on her marriage and family. Born and raised as a member of the Church of Jesus Christ of Latter Day Saints, Shore cites her faith as the primary reason for her decision. After her marriage, Shore and her husband moved to Utah, where she has lived ever since. In 1974, the Brigham Young University Motion Picture Studio invited Shore to star in a short film called Cipher in the Snow. To date, it is her final film credit.
