= Max Eiselin =

Swiss mountaineer (1932–2026)

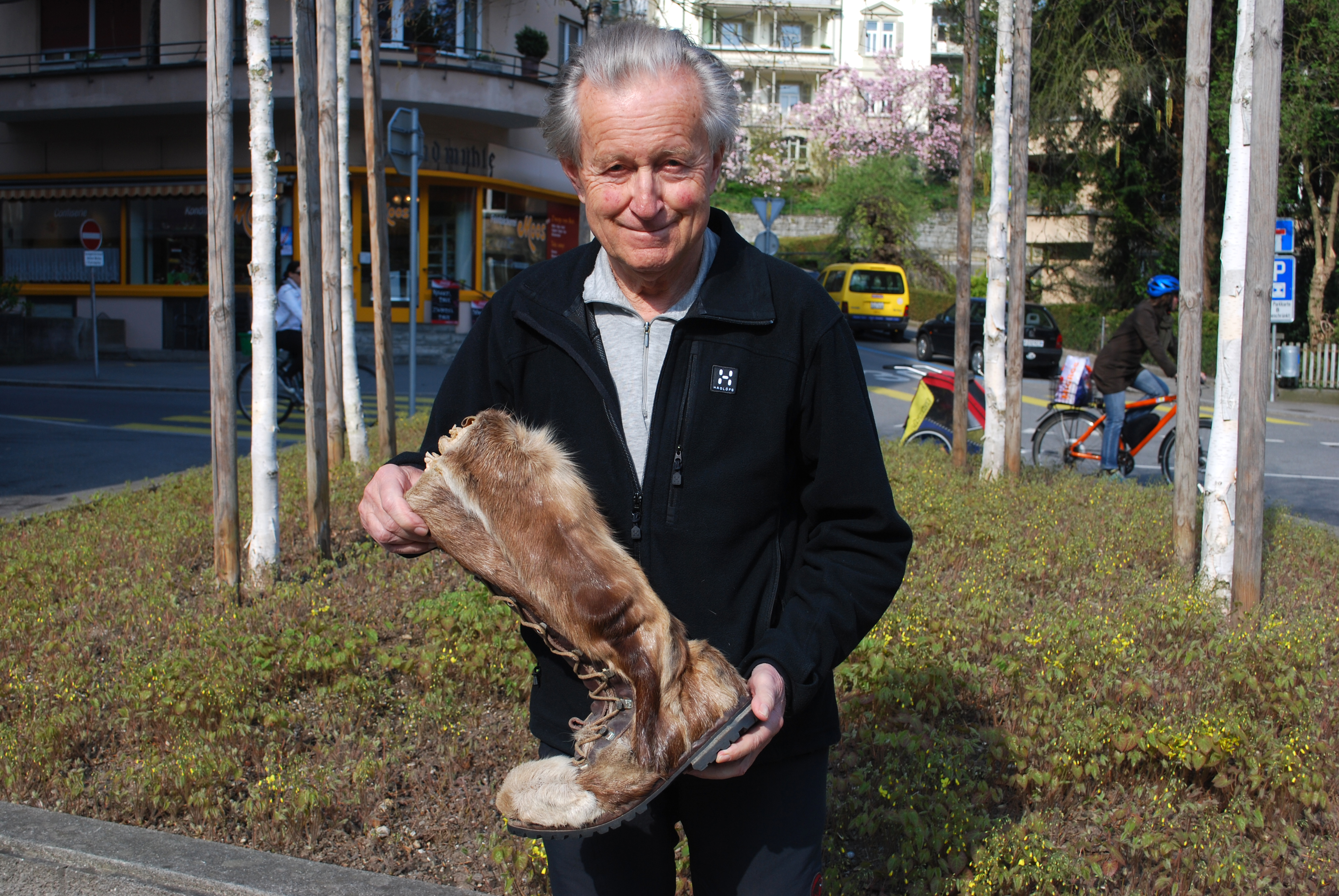
Eiselin in 2010

Max Eiselin (8 January 1932 – 9 July 2026) was a Swiss mountaineer, expedition climbing leader, and businessman. In May 1960, Eiselin led the expedition that made the first successful ascent of the eight-thousander, Dhaulagiri, in Nepal. During the 1950s, Eiselin opened the first store in Switzerland specializing in mountaineering equipment after noticing the limited amount of mountaineering merchandise available at existing sporting goods stores in the country. The last Eiselin mountaineering shops closed in Geneva and Zurich in 2017. Eiselin died on 9 July 2026, at the age of 94.
