= The Comedy Spot =

American television anthology series

- Also known as: Comedy Spotlight
- Genre: Anthology series
- Presented by: Art Gilmore (in 1960)
- Country of origin: United States
- Original language: English
- No. of seasons: 3
- No. of episodes: 31

Production
- Running time: 30 minutes

Original release
- Network: CBS
- Release: June 28, 1960 – September 18, 1962

The Comedy Spot is an American anthology television series that aired on CBS in the summers of 1960, 1961 (when it was known as Comedy Spotlight), and 1962. The 30-minute episodes consisted of a combination of unsold television pilots and repeats of episodes aired previously on other anthology series.

== Background ==
By the mid-1950s, the practice of television executives of ordering dozens of pilots for proposed television series each year – far more than their networks could possibly broadcast as series – had created a sizable body of unsold pilots that had never aired. By 1954, the American television industry had begun to consider the idea of packaging these unsold pilots in anthology series and airing them during the summer, providing television networks with a way of both providing fresh programming during the summer rerun season and recouping at least some of the expense of producing them. ABC and NBC pioneered the concept in the summer of 1956, simultaneously premiering G.E. Summer Originals (on ABC) and Sneak Preview (on NBC), but CBS did not air its first two such series, The Comedy Spot and New Comedy Showcase, until the summer of 1960.

== Production and content ==
Art Gilmore hosted The Comedy Spot in 1960. Its name and content changed from year to year. In the summer of 1960, it consisted of a combination of unsold pilots and reruns of episodes of General Electric Theater and NBC's Colgate Theater. It was retitled Comedy Spotlight for the summer of 1961, and that year was composed entirely of reruns of General Electric Theater episodes. For its final run in the summer of 1962, it returned to the name The Comedy Spot and consisted entirely of unsold pilots, one of them a repeat of an episode aired in 1960 on New Comedy Showcase.

On July 19, 1960, The Comedy Spot aired the unsold pilot "Head of the Family," which told the story of Robbie Petrie, a writer for a comedy television show who has trouble explaining to his son Ritchie what he does at work. With a revamped cast but largely the same characters, a reworked version of "Head of the Family" became the successful situation comedy The Dick Van Dyke Show, which aired from 1961 to 1966, and the plot of "Head of the Family" served as the basis of The Dick Van Dyke Show′s February 1962 episode "Father of the Week."

CBS filmed "A Pony for Chris," a pilot for a proposed series titled Medicine Man, starring Ernie Kovacs and Buster Keaton, in which Kovacs played Dr. P. Crookshank, a traveling medicine salesman in the 1870s who was selling "Mother McGreevy's Wizard Juice," also known as "man's best friend in a bottle." The day after filming some of the scenes for the pilot, Kovacs died in an automobile accident on January 13, 1962. CBS made plans to broadcast the pilot for Medicine Man as an episode of The Comedy Spot in 1962, but dropped the idea after encountering problems with Kovacs's estate.

== Broadcast history ==
A summer replacement series for The Red Skelton Show, The Comedy Spot ran for 11 episodes over the course of 13 weeks in the summer of 1960, airing on CBS from 9:30 to 10:00 p.m. Eastern Time on Tuesday evenings. It premiered on June 28, and its last episode aired on September 20. It returned in the summer of 1961 with the title Comedy Spotlight and moved to the 9:00–9:30 p.m. time slot on Tuesdays, replacing The Tom Ewell Show. It premiered on July 25, 1961, running for nine consecutive weeks and concluding its season on September 19. Reverting to the name The Comedy Spot but remaining in the 9:00–9:30 p.m. time slot on Tuesdays, it had its last run in the summer of 1962, again as a summer replacement for The Red Skelton Show. It premiered on July 3, 1962, and aired 11 episodes over the course of 12 weeks. Its final episode aired on September 18, 1962.

== Episodes ==
=== Season 1 (The Comedy Spot, 1960) ===
No. in season	Title	Directed by	Written by	Original release date
1	"Ben Blue's Brothers"	Norman Z. McLeod	Russell Beggs & Marion Hargrove	June 28, 1960
Vaudevillian Ben Blue and his brothers interact in a box at the opera. Sources agree that Blue portrays multiple roles — himself as the vaudevillian and all of vaudevillian's brothers — but disagree on the number of brothers: According to some, Blue plays three brothers (a wealthy snob, a tramp, and an average guy) in addition to himself, while others claim that he plays two brothers (a ne'er-do-well and a straight-laced businessman) in addition to himself and also interacts with the wife of one of them. Also starring Ruth McDevitt, Barbara Heller, Robin Raymond, Lillian Culver, Yvette Vickers, Jane McGowan, and Fred Essler. An unsold pilot filmed in 1958.
2	"McGarry and Me"	Unknown	Unknown	July 5, 1960
After a policeman named McGarry who has errant and highly eccentric ideas about his duties loses two weeks' pay while gambling with his fellow police officers using confiscated money (or confiscated equipment, according to some sources) and comes home without his pay, he tries to appease his wife Kitty by making up a story about how the money "disappeared" — but she nonetheless attempts to find out where the money went. The episode begins with an introduction narrated by Art Gilmore discussing an invasion of ants. An unsold pilot starring Michael O'Shea and Virginia Mayo based on characters created by Matt Taylor for a national magazine series.
3	"Head of the Family"	Don Weis	Carl Reiner	July 19, 1960
Robbie Petrie is a successful man: He makes a good income in New York City as the head writer for a comedian who headlines a television series, owns a home in suburban Westchester County, New York, and has an attractive wife named Laura and a healthy six-year-old son named Ritchie. But after he is asked to write an amusing bulletin for a parent–teacher association function, he has trouble explaining to Ritchie what a television writer does at work, so Laura talks a skeptical Robbie into taking Ritchie to work for a day to see what he does — but the visit does not improve Ritchie's understanding. Starring Carl Reiner, Barbara Britton, Morty Gunty, Sylvia Miles, Gary Morgan, Jack Wakefield, Milt Kamen, Jean Sincere, Nancy Kenyon, Joey Trent, and Mannie Sloane. An unsold pilot which was reworked with a new cast to become The Dick Van Dyke Show of 1961–1966, which used this pilot's plot as the basis for its 1962 episode "Father of the Week."
4	"I Was a Bloodhound"	Sidney Lanfield	Laurence Marks & Milton Pascal	August 2, 1960
When a baby Indian elephant, a symbol of royal grandeur in Puranajab, disappears from a hotel room and its owner receives a ransom demand for US$50,000, the prime minister of Puranajab and the personal bodyguard to Prince Fahan of Puranajab hire Barney Colby, a private investigator with a keen sense of smell which he uses in his detective work, to find the animal. Starring Ernie Kovacs, Lawrence Dobkin, Shirley Mitchell, Bart Bradley, Robert Nash, Michael Garrett, Yvonne White, Joseph Mell, Frank Sully, Phil Arnold, and Tony Michaels. A repeat of an episode of General Electric Theater that originally aired on February 15, 1959.
5	"The Incredible Jewel Robbery"	Mitchell Leisen	Dallas Gaultois & James Edmiston	August 9, 1960
In an episode with only one line of dialogue and otherwise performed entirely in pantomime, two inexperienced safecrackers plan the perfect crime, involving one dressed as a police officer and driving up to "arrest" the other in a car marked as a police car and both of them disguising themselves as Groucho Marx — and they almost get away with it. Starring Chico Marx, Harpo Marx, Benny Rubin, Joy Rogers, Russell Custer, Charles Fogel, and Hans Moebus, with a fleeting cameo appearance by Groucho Marx. A repeat of an episode of General Electric Theater that originally aired on March 8, 1959.
6	"The Sky's the Limit"	Paul Harrison	Berni Gould & Paul Harrison	August 16, 1960
Three young United States Navy officers undergoing naval aviation training at Naval Air Station Pensacola in Florida make an unauthorized flight while an admiral is inspecting the base that disrupts a drill parade and a shipboatd full-dress review — and generally upsets Navy leadership. An unsold pilot starring Doug McClure, Ross Martin, Joey Forman, and Ralph Dumke. Originally titled "Now Hear This."
7	"Welcome to Washington"	Norman Tokar	Inez Asher & Whitfield Cook	August 23, 1960
After newly elected congresswoman Elizabeth Harper arrives in Washington, D.C., along with her doting husband, her two children, and a menagerie of pets, she discovers that there is a lot more to representing her legislative district than merely passing legislation — including tiresomely talkative constituents and, as one of her first challenges, house-hunting with her husband. Starring Claudette Colbert, Elvia Allman, Florenz Ames, Eric Anderson, Herb Butterfield, Malcolm Cassell, Herb Ellis, Leif Erickson, Shelley Fabares, Tony Henning, Doris Packer, Maudie Prickett, and Paula Winslowe. An unsold pilot for a proposed series, The Claudette Colbert Show, which previously aired on NBC on Colgate Theatre on September 30, 1958. Network executives rejected the pilot at least in part because of their concern about "making fun of Washington."
8	"Meet the Girls"	Charles Barton	Roger Clay	August 30, 1960
Three young women from small towns who are styled as "The Brain," "The Face," and "The Shape" move to New York City in search of fame, fortune, and marriage to rich husbands. They set up housekeeping and have fun but encounter a number of problems and unusual men as they pursue their goals. An unsold pilot starring Mamie Van Doren, Gale Robbins, Virginia Field, John Bryant, Darlene Fields, Cynthia Leighton, and Ralph Sanford.
9	"Adventures of a Model"	Norman Tokar	Sidney Sheldon	September 6, 1960
After her boss assigns her to a job modeling sportswear for an energetic Texas sportswear manufacturer in the hope of winning his account for the modeling agency, a beautiful fashion model who dislikes athletics must please the Texan by pretending to be athletic and enduring an agonizing series of physical challenges while modeling things such as beachwear, a bridal gown, and a cowgirl outfit — all while using her wits to hold off wolfish suitors. Starring Joanne Dru, Roxanne Arlen, Phil Arnold, Jimmy Cross, John Emery, Bob Jellison, William Kendis, Nancy Kulp, William Redfield, Charles Wagenheim, and Roland Winters. A repeat of an episode which previously aired on NBC on Colgate Theatre on August 19, 1958.
10	"Full Speed Anywhere"	Don Taylor	Jack Elinson & Charles Isaacs	September 13, 1960
The bored crewmen of a small United States Coast Guard patrol boat find their harbor patrol duties tedious, but they finally receive orders for some action – participation in fleet maneuvers. But then a yeoman comes down with the mumps, and the patrol boat's commanding officer and crew conspire to get him ashore unnoticed. An unsold pilot starring Stubby Kaye, Conrad Janis, George Dunn, Glen Turnbull, Pedro Gonzalez Gonzalez, Edwin Bruce, and Jonathan Hale.
11	"Tom, Dick and Harry"	Oscar Rudolph	Ben Starr	September 20, 1960
Newly discharged from the United States Army, three war buddies decide to abandon their individual civilian careers and open a restaurant together – and decide that the best way to get a free lease on a restaurant is for one of them to marry the owner's daughter. An unsold pilot starring Gene Nelson, Joe Mantell, Marvin Kaplan, Cheryl Calloway, Pamela Dean, Howard McNear, Hazel Shermet, Irene Ryan, and Mavis Davenport.

=== Season 2 (Comedy Spotlight, 1961) ===
No. in season	Title	Directed by	Written by	Original release date
1	"Bachelor's Bride"	Michael Leisen	Mortimer Braus & Joseph Hoffman	July 25, 1961
When a famous and successful author — and confirmed bachelor — visits Vermont to write a book, he meets a young woman who falls in love with him and tries to foil her matrimonial ambitions. Starring Fred MacMurray, Patricia Crowley, Virginia Field, Lawrence Keating, and Sarah Selby. A repeat of an episode of General Electric Theater that originally aired on February 20, 1955.
2	"Love Came Late"	Robert B. Sinclair	Robert Carson & Leon Gordon	August 1, 1961
When a United States Army veteran and father attending college and struggling to adjust from military to civilian life has poor grades, his professor is unsympathetic toward him until the veteran's mother intervenes and uses her feminine charm to show the professor that there is more to higher education than passing grades. Starring Melvyn Douglas, Darryl Hickman, Myrna Loy, David Armstrong, Jack Chefe, Alan DeWitt, Robert Ellis, Joseph Kearns, Jennifer Lea, Ted Mapes, Harry Strang, Max Power, and Frank Tweddell. A repeat of an episode of General Electric Theater that originally aired on November 17, 1957.
3	"Blaze of Glory"	Don Weis	James B. Allardice & Paul W. Fairman	August 8, 1961
A bashful plumber responds to a late-night call from a beautiful woman who cunningly talks him into recovering priceless gems from a wash basin drain. She is a member of a gang of jewel thieves, and as the night continues, the plumber becomes involved in a dangerous — but comical — misadventure. Starring Lou Costello, Jonathan Harris, Joyce Jameson, Lurene Tuttle, Joseph Martorano, Herman Rudin, Olan Soulé, and Phil Arnold. A repeat of an episode of General Electric Theater that originally aired on September 21, 1958.
4	"A New York Knight"	James Neilson	Jameson Brewer & Richard Connell	August 15, 1961
In an act of sympathy, a lonely old derelict who himself finds sympathy from no one buys an equally friendless horse to save it from slaughter and finds himself in the unaccustomed position of having to earn a living for them both. Starring Charles Laughton, Gavin Gordon, Nestor Paiva, Irving Bacon, Anthony Eustrel, Earle Hodgins, Addison Richards, Bartlett Robinson, Ted Wedderspoon, Norma DeHaan, Gil Donaldson, Boyd "Red" Morgan, and John Ayres. A repeat of an episode of General Electric Theater that originally aired on March 2, 1958.
5	"The World's Greatest Quarterback"	Ray Milland	Thomas Nord Riley	August 22, 1961
Several years after his athletic heyday ended, a penniless former American football star returns with his family to his home town and discovers that he still is a hero there. He becomes involved in his daughter's romance with a young football star. He also finds that the townspeople assume he is financially successful, and he decides to take advantage of that — because he and his ex-wife got a very good deal when they bought a rare Picasso painting on their honeymoon and he needs cash. Starring Ernie Kovacs, Suzanne Pleshette, Ronnie Burns, Roger Til, and Audrey Totter. A repeat of an episode of General Electric Theater that originally aired on October 19, 1958.
6	"The Glorious Gift of Molly Malloy"	Herschel Daugherty	Jameson Brewer	August 29, 1961
An Irish schoolteacher with a mysterious ability to communicate with the world of leprechauns confuses a board of scientists by explaining that a difficult problem in physics is the work of leprechauns, and they decide to look for a logical explanation for her strange ability. Beloved by her students, she refuses to follow the stringent principles a professor has set up as the foundation of modern education. Her superiors are alarmed by the possible effects on children of her strange gift, and her actions almost disrupt all of Ireland. Starring Greer Garson, John Abbott, Jimmy Fields, John Gallaudet, Charles Herbert, John Hoyt, J. M. Kerrigan, and Ludwig Stössel. A repeat of an episode of General Electric Theater that originally aired on September 23, 1956. The episode was Greer Garson's first foray into television in 1956.
7	"Miracle at the Opera"	Mitchell Leisen	Frank Gabrielson	September 5, 1961
A lonely second-string flutist and music teacher is devoted to his dog Linda, in whose company he finds great comfort. When a prima donna loses her voice during an opera performance while the dog is recovering from a tonsillectomy, the dog begins to sing, completing the performance in a beautiful soprano voice in perfect German. Starring Ed Wynn, Barbara Morrison, Sig Ruman, Fortunio Bonanova, Maggie Pierce, Cyril Delevanti, Fritz Feld, Paul Frees, Robert Nash, and Jack Rice. A repeat of an episode of General Electric Theater that originally aired on September 20, 1959.
8	"The Incredible Jewel Robbery"	Mitchell Leisen	Dallas Gaultois & James Edmiston	September 12, 1961
In an episode with only one line of dialogue and otherwise performed entirely in pantomime, two inexperienced safecrackers plan the perfect crime, involving one dressed as a police officer and driving up to "arrest" the other in a car marked as a police car and both of them disguising themselves as Groucho Marx — and they almost get away with it. Starring Chico Marx, Harpo Marx, Benny Rubin, Joy Rogers, Russell Custer, Charles Fogel, and Hans Moebus, with a fleeting cameo appearance by Groucho Marx. A repeat of an episode of General Electric Theater that originally aired on March 8, 1959 and then later on The Comedy Spot on August 9, 1960.
9	"Platinum on the Rocks"	Sidney Lanfield	Donn Baylor, Laurence Marks, & Milton Pascal	September 19, 1961
In search of excitement, an ex-vaudevillian ends up facing a false robbery charge, allowing him a taste of the life of a gentleman thief in the mold of the fictional A. J. Raffles. Starring George Burns, Eleanor Audley, Fred Beir, Kaye Elhardt, Milton Frome, Jonathan Hole, Betsy Jones-Moreland, Joanne Lee, Charles Tannen, and Frank Wilcox. A repeat of an episode of General Electric Theater that originally aired on November 29, 1959.

=== Season 3 (The Comedy Spot, 1962) ===
No. in season	Title	Directed by	Written by	Original release date
1	"The Soft Touch"	Sidney Salkow	Don Nelson & Jay Sommers	July 3, 1962
A beautiful but rather scatterbrained young woman believes that intuition is a better method than collateral for determining which loans her father's finance company should make, and she tries to loan $300 to a neighbor seeking to glamorize herself and trap a man. An unsold pilot starring Marie Wilson, Charles Ruggles, Madge Blake, Charles Lane, El Brendel, Nancy Kulp, James Flavin, Hayden Rorke, Jack Straw, and Claude Stroud.
2	"For the Love of Mike"	Unknown	Unknown	July 10, 1962
A newly married couple has money problems, so to bring in more income for herself and her intern husband the bride takes a job as a vocalist for a dance band whose leader is a vain nitwit. An unsold pilot starring Shirley Jones, Burt Metcalfe, and Gale Gordon.
3	"Octavius and Me"	Don Taylor	Don Taylor & George Tibbles	July 17, 1962
Ockie and Hattie Todds, a retired couple, buy a huge travel trailer loaded with electrical gadgets — including tables which slide in and out at the push of a button and an electric sign on the rear that advises following motorists as to what they should do — and travel around the United States. They periodically pay return visits to the Abide-a-Bit trailer court, where some of their friends live, and while there they often get involved in their friends' personal lives and try to help them with their problems. During one such visit they meet John Drake, a young graduate student so busy with writing his thesis that he is ignoring his wife, and Ockie and Hattie help the young couple patch up their cooling marriage. An unsold pilot starring Dub Taylor, Lois Bridge, Grace Albertson, George O'Hanlon, James Douglas, Kaye Elhardt, Louise Lorimer, and Walter Stocker. Filmed in 1960.
4	"Maggie"	Rod Amateau	Bill Manhoff	July 24, 1962
A famous and sophisticated Broadway husband-and-wife acting team moves from Manhattan to the peace and quiet of a staid old small town in suburban Connecticut and tries to fit in, but the overactive imagination of their rambunctious, scatterbrained, mischievous, but clever 16-year-old daughter Maggie often leads to disaster at home and havoc in the community. Maggie's antics undermine her parents with journalists and their new neighbors, and after she tries to convince the elderly spinster next door that the man the woman hired as her gardener is in love with her, her parents end up facing a lawsuit. Starring Margaret O'Brien, Fay Baker, Leon Ames, Jeanne Tatum, Charles Cantor, Jesslyn Fax, Edwin Bruce, Michael Emmet, and Mona Knox, Narrated by Art Gilmore. A repeat of an unsold pilot previously aired as an episode of New Comedy Showcase on August 29, 1960.
5	"Poor Mr. Campbell"	David Swift	David Swift	August 7, 1962
Harley Campbell's shrewish and nagging wife Ardice makes life unbearable for him, so he concocts a murder scheme to get rid of her. He succeeds in killing Ardice, but his escape plan unexpectedly ends up involving Priscilla Edwards — a beautiful young woman and femme fatale — and ironically results in his own untimely demise at Priscilla's hands. An unsold pilot starring Agnes Moorhead, Edward Andrews, Ruta Lee, Mary Grace Canfield, Barbara Pepper, and Harry Landers.
6	"I Love My Doctor"	David Butler	Everett Freeman	August 14, 1962
A young physician and his wife and two children move from the big city to a small rural community, where he struggles to get his practice started. His wife helps him by campaigning for patients for him — and succeeds too well with the women of the town when her husband becomes the center of a great deal of feminine attraction. An unsold pilot starring Don Porter, Phyllis Avery, Rickey Kelman, Terry Burnham, Helen Kleeb, Eleanor Audley, Frances Helm, Michael Garth, Todd Farrell, George Calliga, and Harry Mayo. Based on the works of Evelyn Barkins. Filmed in 1958.
7	"The Mighty O"	Unknown	Bill Brennan	August 21, 1962
When Chief Petty Officer Blaney reenlists in the United States Coast Guard, his girlfriend Lola decides to celebrate it by throwing a surprise party for him. She puts Blaney's friend Chief Petty Officer Slattery in charge of the refreshments — and trouble ensures when Slattery steals pies for the party from their ship and Slattery's girlfriend tries to break up the party. An unsold pilot starring Craig Stevens, Alan Hale, Jr., Lola Albright, Whit Bissell, Jane Easton, Jamie Farr, Don Garner, Richard Jaeckel, Tom Monroe, and Dick Wessel. Filmed in 1954, four years before Stevens and Albright began their run as the co-stars of Peter Gunn in 1958.
8	"Charlie Angelo"	Don McGuire	Don McGure & Richard Michaels	August 28, 1962
Alternative title "Charley Angelo." When an unfortunate nightclub owner with financial problems considers arson as a way of getting out of debt, a clumsy, misfit angel is given the task of keeping him from burning down his nightclub for the insurance money. The Devil intervenes to try to foil the angel's efforts, forcing the angel to engage in a battle of good and evil. An unsold pilot starring James Komack, Larry Storch, and Bernard Kates. Produced by Jackie Cooper.
9	"His Model Wife"	Norman Tokar	Barbara Hammer	September 4, 1962
Jeanne and John Lauren — a former model and a magazine publisher, respectively — are a married couple with two children. They decide that their recently hired housekeeper, Miss Biekel, is not measuring up, particularly in caring for their two sons. However, they disagree on how to tell her that her services are no longer needed and on who should break the news to her. Trying to work up the courage to give Miss Biekel the bad news, they begin separate efforts to fire her. An unsold pilot starring Jeanne Crain, John Vivyan, Jimmie Lee Gaines, Alice Frost, Jack Mullaney, Jerry Barclay, Frances Robinson, Annelle Hayes, and Larri Thomas. Produced by Tony Owen. Filmed in 1960.
10	"You're Only Young Once"	Richard L. Bare	Norman Riley	September 11, 1962
Due to their precarious finances, Casey and Liza McDermott, a young newlywed couple attending the University of Southern California, are forced to live in an on-campus Quonset hut village that serves as a college dormitory for married students — and trouble arises when Liza finds Casey in the arms of Mildred Offenbach. An unsold pilot starring Lynn Alden, Phillip O'Hanlon, Patricia Blair, Charlie Briggs, Ann Morgan Gilbert, Gary Hunley, Jim Hutton, Frank Killmond, and Dorothy Provine.
11	"Time Out for Ginger"	Andrew McCullough	Ronald Alexander	September 18, 1962
Alternative title "Life with Virginia." When her older sister needs a car for a date, a boisterous, feisty, irrepressible, but lovable teenage girl with a penchant for solving everyone's problems tries to buy one for her. An unsold pilot starring Candy Moore, Maggie Hayes, Karl Swenson, Roberta Shore, Margaret Hamilton, Peter Leeds, Harry Bellaver, Hugh Sanders, John Rockwell, Robert B. Williams, Rickie Sorensen, and Johnny Eimen.
