= The New Bob Cummings Show =

American TV sitcom (1961–1962)

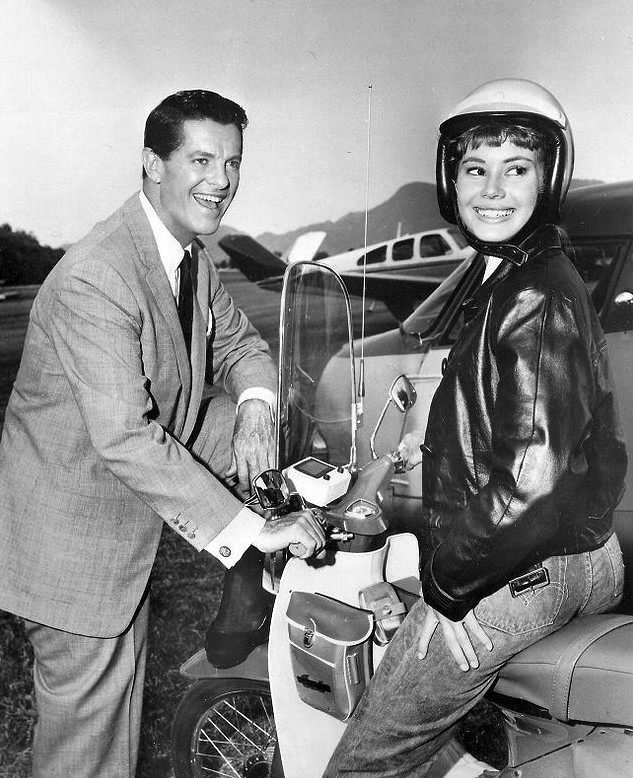
- Bob Cummings and Roberta Shore
- Also known as: The Bob Cummings Show
- Genre: Sitcom
- Created by: Roland Kibbee
- Written by: Jerry Adelman; Roscoe J. Armbuster Jr; Mel Diamond; Lee Erwin; Robert Fisher; Austin Kalish; Sheldon Keller; Howard Leeds; Alan Lipscott; Milt Rosen; Sheldon Stark
- Directed by: Earl Bellamy; John English; Don Weis
- Starring: Bob Cummings; Roberta Shore; Murvyn Vye
- Composer: Stanley Wilson
- Country of origin: United States
- Original language: English
- No. of seasons: 1
- No. of episodes: 22

Production
- Camera setup: Multi-camera
- Running time: 22–24 minutes
- Production company: Revue Studios

Original release
- Network: CBS
- Release: October 5, 1961 – March 1, 1962

The New Bob Cummings Show is an American sitcom broadcast by CBS from October 5, 1961 to March 1, 1962. Originally titled The Bob Cummings Show when it first appeared in 1961, effective December 28, 1961, the title was changed to The New Bob Cummings Show because of confusion between this program and the earlier series The Bob Cummings Show (1955-1959).

== Synopsis ==
The New Bob Cummings Show began two years after production had ended on Cummings's previous, successful sitcom The Bob Cummings Show, which was still being rerun on ABC's daytime schedule under the title Love That Bob.

The new program, like its predecessor, took advantage of Cummings's real-life interests; once again, the character he played, Bob Carson, was a pilot. Carson owned two planes, a conventional, twin-engine plane that he used for long trips, and the Aerocar, which he used for short hops near his California base. As its name implied, the aerocar was a vehicle that could be flown or, with its wing detached, driven on highways as an automobile.

In addition to his activities as a charter pilot, Carson was an amateur detective, a fact that provided the basis for the plots of most of the episodes. In contrast to Cummings's earlier program, which had several co-stars, the only recurring roles in The New Bob Cummings Show other than Cummings's own were that of "Lionel", Carson's bodyguard, played by Murvyn Vye, and "Hank", the tomboyish-yet-precocious teenage daughter of the owner of the airstrip where Carson's planes were based, played by Roberta Shore.

== Production ==
When The Bob Cummings Show ended, Cummings said he was not keen to do comedy for his next series. However The New Bob Cummings Show was very much in the same vein as the first one. The show was announced in April 1961. The network said Cummings's character would do anything that was not "illegal, immoral or underpaid". It was filmed by Revue Studios/Revue Productions and sponsored by the Kellogg Company breakfast cereal manufacturers and Brown & Williamson Tobacco.

The show replaced Dick Powell's Zane Grey Theatre (1957-1961), a Western anthology series, featuring short stories and plots inspired by Western author Zane Grey and hosted by Dick Powell.

== Episodes ==
No.	Title	Directed by	Written by	Original release date
1	"Executive Sweet"	Don Weis	Mel Diamond & Henry Sharp	October 5, 1961
2	"Very Warm for Mayan"	Don Weis	Sheldon Stark & Mel Diamond	October 12, 1961
3	"Vive La Credit Card"	Don Weis	Howard Leeds	October 19, 1961
4	"The Ox-Tail Incident"	John English	Roscoe J. Armbuster Jr.	October 26, 1961
5	"Roamin' Holiday"	Don Weis	Alan Lipscott & Bob Fisher	November 2, 1961
6	"Who Chopped Down the Cherokee"	Don Weis	Jerry Adelman, Lee Erwin, & Mel Diamond	November 9, 1961
Bob tries to convince some Native Americans to give up land for a missile base.
7	"Always On Tuesday"	Earl Bellamy	Howard Leeds	November 16, 1961
8	"Re: Fifi"	Earl Bellamy	Sheldon Keller & Mel Diamond	November 23, 1961
9	"The Guns of Abalone"	Earl Bellamy	Austin Kalish, Milt Rosen, & Mel Diamond	November 30, 1961
10	"Lavender's Hale"	David Orrick McDearmon	Joel Rapp & Sam Locke	December 7, 1961
11	"The Saga of Twangy McCoombs"	Don Weis	Mannie Manheim, Arthur Marx & Mel Diamond	December 14, 1961
12	"National Satin"	David Orrick McDearmon	Glenn Wheaton, Elroy Schwartz, & Mel Diamond	December 21, 1961
13	"La Dolce Roma"	Earl Bellamy	Lee Karson & Ron Bishop	December 28, 1961
14	"The Unretouchables"	Unknown	Unknown	January 4, 1962
15	"Swiss Family Gogerty"	Eddie Rubin	Mel Diamond & Austin Kalish	January 11, 1962
16	"The Turbulent Thirties"	Don Weis	Austin Kalish & Mel Diamond	January 18, 1962
17	"U.N. The Night and the Music"	Eddie Rubin	Howard Leeds & Mel Diamond	January 25, 1962
18	"A Cuppa Cawfee, a Sangwich, and Youse"	Unknown	Unknown	February 1, 1962
19	"My Son, The Voodoo Doctor"	Eddie Rubin	T : Mel Diamond & Austin Kalish; S/T : Peter Bourne, Mel Diamond, & Austin Kalish	February 8, 1962
20	"Operation Cake Lift"	Eddie Rubin	Sol Stein, Glenn Wolfe, & Mel Diamond	February 15, 1962
21	"North by Southeast"	David Orrick McDearmon	Steve Fisher & Mel Diamond	February 22, 1962
22	"Fasten Your Money Belt"	Herschel Daugherty	Ronald Kibbee	March 1, 1962

== Reception ==
The show aired on Thursday nights, initially from 8:30 to 9 p.m. Eastern Time, then (beginning in February 1962), from 7:30 to 8 p.m. E. T. It was opposite two popular shows, The Real McCoys (1957-1963), a hill country rural comedy starring Walter Brennan, Richard Crenna, and Kathleen Nolan, set in California on ABC / CBS, and the medical drama Dr. Kildare (1961-1966) with Richard Chamberlain and Raymond Massey on NBC.

The New York Times said "the style but not the setting is about the same as his past series... Fast talk, pretty girls and breezy comedy are still the main ingredients. It's bright, quick, inconsequential and inoffensive."

Filmink said the series "had the same flaws as My Hero – i.e. a weak concept (a pilot has adventures) and no sense of family."

== Cancellation ==
Two months after the show debuted in October the title was changed to The New Bob Cummings Show. Ratings did not improve and in January 1962, the show was cancelled. The last episode aired on March 1, 1962. It was replaced by Oh! Those Bells (March-May 1962).
