= Jackpot Bowling =

- Directed by: David Brown (1960-61)
- Presented by: Leo Durocher (January 1959); Mel Allen (January – April 1959, October 1959 – April 1960); Bud Palmer (April – October 1959, April – June 1960); Milton Berle (1960-1961)
- Country of origin: United States
- No. of seasons: 3

Production
- Producer: Buddy Arnold (1960-61)
- Running time: 15 minutes (1959-60); 30 minutes (1960-61)
- Production companies: NBC Productions (1959–1960); Sagebrush/Bayuk Productions (1960–1961)

Original release
- Network: NBC
- Release: January 9, 1959 – March 13, 1961

Jackpot Bowling (also known as Phillies Jackpot Bowling and Jackpot Bowling Starring Milton Berle) is a professional bowling show on NBC from January 9, 1959, to March 13, 1961.

== Broadcast history ==
=== Short-form version ===
Jackpot Bowling was the first national TV bowling show since Bowling Headliners aired in the early days of television (1948–50). Jackpot Bowling originally aired on Fridays at 10:45 PM following the Cavalcade of Sports Friday Night Fight. It took place at the T-Bowl in Wayne, New Jersey. In its original format, Jackpot Bowling's time slot varied widely because it was led into by professional boxing bouts, which could end very quickly or stretch out to the full fifteen rounds at the time. Jackpot Bowling would thus pad out the time slot for however much extra time was needed to round out the hour. (Make That Spare, a show produced by rival ABC with the sanctioning of the Professional Bowlers Association, followed a similar constraint when it debuted a year after Jackpot Bowling and would maintain that format throughout its four-year run.)

Leo Durocher was the show's first host, but bowed out after only two shows and was replaced by Mel Allen. On April 10, 1959, Bud Palmer became the show's third host. Allen and Palmer each had obligations during their respective sport's seasons (Allen was a baseball man, Palmer was from the field of basketball), and thus they would trade positions each October and April throughout the show's first run. Of the three hosts, Allen, who knew little about bowling, was the most poorly received.

The show was put on a summer hiatus after the June 24, 1960, episode, as its Cavalcade of Sports lead-in had ended its run on NBC.

=== Long-form version ===
On September 19, 1960, Jackpot Bowling returned as a stand-alone show with its own 30-minute time slot, Mondays at 10:30 p.m. Brunswick became a co-sponsor with Bayuk's Phillies Cigars, and the series moved west to Hollywood, with the Hollywood Legion Lanes becoming the show's new studio. Milton Berle was installed as host with Chick Hearn providing play-by-play. (NBC installed Berle as host in part because the network was desperate to burn off its 30-year contract with Berle, whose popularity had been in steady decline, and also to emphasize more comedy as the nation's taste for high-budget contests had waned in the wake of the 1950s quiz show scandals.) The professional bowler challenges were supplemented with a late-night-style monologue from Berle and segments of celebrities being interviewed by Berle and then rolling a shot for charity.

The series would run only another six months with Berle as host and would end on March 13, 1961.

== Gameplay ==
Two players competed to bowl up to nine strikes. After each bowler took nine turns, the player who bowled more strikes won $1,000. Any player who rolled six strikes in a row won a jackpot which, in the earlier seasons, started at $5,000 and increased $1,000 each week it was not won.

In the final season hosted by Milton Berle, two matches were played in each show. Rolling six strikes in a row in the first match won a flat $5,000. The winner of the first match played against the "king of the hill" bowler for another $1,000, and the right to return the following week as "king of the hill". Rolling six strikes in a row in this second weekly match won the jackpot, which now started at $25,000, with $5,000 added each week that it was not broken.

== Episode status ==
The show's status is unknown. Five Berle episodes exist, including the January 2, 1961, episode on which Detroit's Therm Gibson won a record $75,000 jackpot, the January 16 episode with British sex symbol Diana Dors bowling (and her husband Richard Dawson in the audience), and the January 23 episode where comic Harry Ritz bowled himself down the lane and got a strike.
