= Happy (1960 TV series) =

- Genre: Situation comedy
- Starring: Ronnie Burns; Yvonne Lime; Lloyd Corrigan
- Country of origin: United States
- Original language: English
- No. of seasons: 2
- No. of episodes: 26

Production
- Running time: 30 mins. (approx)
- Production company: Roncom Video Film Productions

Original release
- Network: NBC
- Release: June 8, 1960 – April 7, 1961

Happy is an American sitcom that aired on NBC during the summer of 1960, and then during the winter and spring of 1961. The series depicts the events at a motel in Palm Springs, California, run by a young married couple with commentary provided by the voiced thoughts of their infant son.

== Plot ==
Chris and Sally Day are a young married couple who are co-owners along with Clara Mason of the Desert Palm Motel or Desert Palms Hotel (according to different sources), an upscale resort in Palm Springs, California. When they got married in 1957, they spent their honeymoon in Palm Springs and stayed in Room 7 of the Desert Palm, where two dozen yellow roses, a bowl of floating gardenias, and a wedding cake with a bride and groom on top greeted them. Chris later learned that the Desert Palm's owner, Clara Mason, was looking for someone to run it for her and inquired about the position. Clara hired Chris and offered Chris and Sally an opportunity to buy part-ownership in the Desert Palm.

By 1960, Chris and Sally own 10 percent of the Desert Palm, and Chris is its manager. Clara is in romantic pursuit of Sally's uncle, Charlie Dooley, who also lives on the premises and tries to help with the motel; although he is well-intentioned, his efforts often lead to complications for Chris and Sally. Joe and Terry Brigham are a married couple and are friends of Chris's and Sally's.

Witnessing it all is the Days' infant son Christopher Hapgood Day, known as "Happy." Happy communicates his feelings about what he sees to the audience not only through his facial expressions, but also through his thoughts, spoken by an off-camera voice.

== Cast ==
- David Born/Steven Born as Christopher Hapgood "Happy" Day
- Ronnie Burns as Chris Day
- Yvonne Lime as Sally Day
- Lloyd Corrigan as Uncle Charlie Dooley
- Doris Packer as Clara Mason
- Burt Metcalfe as Joe Brigham
- Wanda Shannon as Terry Brigham
- Leone Ledoux as Happy's voice

== Production ==
Perry Como's production company Roncom Video Film Productions produced Happy. Twin boys, David and Steven Born, portrayed Happy on camera, and Leone Ledoux provided Happy's off-camera voice. Twenty-six episodes were produced.

Happy′s premise of a narrating baby was borrowed from that of an earlier series, The People's Choice, in which the thoughts of a Basset Hound provided comments on the plot. It was a familiar format for Ronnie Burns, the adopted son of George Burns and Gracie Allen; he had appeared on The George Burns and Gracie Allen Show, in which George Burns's off-camera voice narrated each episode.

The talking baby idea was later revived in the 1989 movie Look Who's Talking and its 1990 sequel Look Who's Talking Too, as well as in the 1991–1992 television series Baby Talk.

== Broadcast history ==
Happy premiered on NBC on June 8, 1960, as a summer replacement series for the first half hour of The Perry Como Show. The second half hour was filled by the premiering Western series Tate, which was also a Roncom production. Happy ran that summer on Wednesdays at 9:00 p.m. Eastern Time for 13 episodes, the last of which aired on September 14, 1960, followed by two reruns on the 21st and 28th. The show returned to the air for a second season on January 13, 1961, this time running on Fridays at 7:30 p.m. Eastern Time. Thirteen more new episodes aired, the last of them on April 7, 1961. Prime-time reruns of Happy then were broadcast until September 8, 1961.

== Episodes ==
=== Season 1 (1960) ===
No. overall	No. in season	Title	Original release date
1	1	"The Wedding Anniversary"	June 8, 1960
Chris forgets his and Sally's wedding anniversary — and has reason to regret it. Guest star: Howard McNear
2	2	"Happy Knows Best"	June 15, 1960
Alternative title "Another Woman." When another woman disrupts the peace of the Day household, Sally becomes convinced that Chris has not been true to her. Guest stars: Ann Whitfield and Valerie Allen.
3	3	"Charlie's First Love"	June 22, 1960
Uncle Charlie's first love comes to visit, and to impress her, he claims he is the owner of the Desert Palms Motel. Guest stars: Virginia Christine and Harry Jackson.
4	4	"Chris's Night Out"	June 29, 1960
While attending his lodge meeting, Chris loses his wedding ring, something he thinks Sally will neither understand nor forgive. Guest stars: Jack Albertson, Doreen Lang, Joanna Lee, Olan Soule, and Cully Richards.
5	5	"Bad Day at Helldorado"	July 6, 1960
Clara asks Chris to deliver valuable bonds to her lawyer. Guest stars: Michael Ross, Dorothy Ford, and Homer Garret and His Hollywood Square Dancers.
6	6	"The Honeymoon"	July 20, 1960
Bob and Betty Nelson are on their honeymoon, but it is almost over before it begins when Betty′s mother insists on giving the newlyweds a house, and Sally and Chris try to keep out of the squabble. Guest star: Steven Terrell.
7	7	"A Bachelor for Clara"	August 3, 1960
After they decide that Uncle Charlie would be much happier if he were married, Sally and Chris begin a campaign to find him a wife.
8	8	"The Father Image"	August 10, 1960
Sally listens to a presentation by a lecturer named Dr. Bradley in which Bradley says that the "father image" is in a state of rapid decline, so she decides to revive the "father image" in Chris. Guest star: Leslie Bradley
9	9	"Sally's Little White Lies"	August 17, 1960
When Clara rehearses a speech for the ladies' club that Sally does not think is very good, Sally tries to avoid hurting Clara's feelings by telling her the speech is good — and later gets in a lot of trouble over her lie. Guest stars: Malcolm Atterbury and George Pirrone.
10	10	"How to Handle a Man"	August 24, 1960
Sally gets a lesson from Clara on how to handle a man as she tries to dissuade Chris from taking a new job in Florida.
11	11	"Accidentally Yours"	August 31, 1960
Chris has an accident while serving as safety chairman.
12	12	"Help Wanted"	September 7, 1960
Feeling unwanted at the Desert Palms Motel, Uncle Charlie leaves for the big city to show that he can make it on his own. After he leaves, Chris and Sally receive a phone call from Conrad Wilton offering Charlie a position managing a big hotel in the Eastern United States. Guest stars: Lorraine Crawford and Richard Deacon.
13	13	"Happy Holiday"	September 14, 1960
Chris and Sally are looking forward to throwing Uncle Charlie a surprise birthday party until Charlie announces that is he is going on vacation — meaning that he will be away on the date of the party.

=== Season 2 (1961) ===
No. overall	No. in season	Title	Original release date
14	1	"Howie"	January 13, 1961
Sally and Chris decide to buy a dog for Happy, but receive a warning that the pet may do psychological harm to the child. Guest star: Lorrie Freeman.
15	2	"Where Am I Going?"	January 20, 1961
Chris wants to invest the family savings in a date farm, but Sally wants the money to stay in the bank — and Happy has a third point of view. Guest stars: Ray Engel and Alvy Moore.
16	3	"Let George Do It"	January 27, 1961
Uncle George comes to visit but outstays his welcome. To encourage him to leave, Chris and Sally decide to put him to work. Guest stars: Ransom Sherman and Bob Anderson.
17	4	"All in a Day's Work"	February 3, 1961
Feeling he is being ignored, Happy tries to take drastic action to get the undivided attention of his parents.
18	5	"The Weekend Nothing Happened"	February 10, 1961
Francis X. Bushman gives Uncle Charlie some advice on courting techniques — and Clara some tips on how to discourage Uncle Charlie.
19	6	"What a Baby!"	February 17, 1961
The Days argue with the Brighams over whose baby should ride the Palm Springs float in the Founders Day parade.
20	7	"Just Ask Clara"	February 24, 1961
Clara's attempts to organize the Day household meet with disapproval from all sides.
21	8	"The First Spanking Paul Harrison"	March 3, 1961
Chris and Sally argue over whether they should spank Happy when he misbehaves, Chris arguing in favor of it. Sally is against it because the Brighams do not spank their daughter Meg out of a fear that it would stunt her growth and creativity. When Happy sets off the hotel′s sprinkler system and drenches the guests, however, Chris believes that it is time for a spanking.
22	9	"Strawberries, Sugar, and Cream"	March 10, 1961
Chris's old girlfriend Mildred Potter comes to Palm Springs with her wealthy husband Axel, and Sally decides to show the Potters how successful the Days have become. Guest stars: Patricia Michon and Ralph Leslow.
23	10	"Class of '61"	March 17, 1961
Sally decides to attend classes on hotel management so that someday she will be able to help Chris manage the Palm Springs Motel — but Chris does not like the idea. Guest stars: Harry Holcombe and Alan De Witt.
24	11	"The Contract"	March 24, 1961
Chris and Sally learn that business and friendship do not mix.
25	12	"Charlie and Clara, Marriage Counselors"	March 31, 1961
Feeling that Chris takes her for granted, Sally asks Uncle Charlie and Clara what to do about it — and they tell her to get a job as a fashion model.
26	13	"The Orphans"	April 7, 1961
Eight orphans from East Asia stay with the Days for the weekend.
