= Fight of the Week =

Live American professional boxing TV series

- Country of origin: United States

Original release
- Network: ABC
- Release: October 8, 1960 – September 11, 1964

Related
- The Gillette Cavalcade of Sports

Fight of the Week is a live American professional boxing series that aired on ABC-TV from 1960 to 1964.

After NBC-TV's cancellation of The Gillette Cavalcade of Sports in the spring of 1960, ABC took over the prime time boxing program, although it was renamed Fight of the Week. Commentator Don Dunphy did the blow-by-blow description of the bouts, which took place on Saturday beginning in October 1960 through September 1963.

From there, the series moved to Friday nights, where it continued until ABC finally canceled prime time boxing after the bout of September 11, 1964, permanently ending 18 years of regularly scheduled prime time boxing on U.S. broadcast network television. The last episode featured a fight between Dick Tiger and Don Fullmer, which Variety said was a "slow waltz that must have had viewers thinking they were watching the demise of the Arthur Murray show". One reason for the downturn of televised boxing occurred on Fight of the Week's the March 24, 1962 broadcast, when Emile Griffith defeated Benny "The Kid" Paret for the Welterweight Championship at New York's Madison Square Garden. Paret was carried from the ring unconscious, and died several days later as a result of his injuries that he had sustained in that bout.

Fight of the Week was consistently paired with a bowling program, Make That Spare, throughout its entire run. In the event that the fight ran shorter than expected, Make That Spare would run longer to square out the hour, and vice versa.

Occasionally, between September 1964 and the mid-1980s, there were a number of boxing events on broadcast television (network and syndication). Since then, however, boxing found a home with several pay-per-view specials, along with monthly, or semi-monthly scheduled bouts on premium channels such as HBO and Showtime, along with the series USA Tuesday Night Fights on USA Network. Currently, the weekly cable bouts can be seen on ESPN2.

Fight of the Week was also shown in the United Kingdom as part of the long-running BBC Saturday afternoon sports programme Grandstand. The Gillette sponsorship was listed in the Radio Times, which was considered daring at the time because the BBC was generally resistant to hints of commercialism (and sponsored programmes were not allowed even on commercial TV in the UK until the early 1990s).

== See also ==
- Boxing in the 1960s
