= Eyewitness to History =

American TV public affairs series (1960–1963)

Eyewitness to History is a Friday night CBS Television Network public affairs program. It was initially hosted by veteran broadcaster Charles Kuralt (1960–61), followed by Walter Cronkite (1961–62), and then Charles Collingwood (1962–63). It aired from September 30, 1960 through July 26, 1963 in the 10:30 pm time slot. Sponsored by the Firestone Tire and Rubber Company, the series concentrated on the most significant news story or stories of the previous week. Major events reviewed included the Kennedy-Nixon 1960 Presidential campaign, highlights of the Kennedy administration, the Bay Of Pigs invasion, the space race, the Cuban Missile Crisis and the civil rights movement.

The show's title was shortened to Eyewitness in 1961. Coincidentally, many local CBS affiliates adopted the branding "Eyewitness News" for their local newscasts in the 1960s.

Leslie Midgley and John Sharnik were the producers.

One of the show's producers, Av Westin, went on to become executive producer of ABC Evening News and, later, 20/20.
