= Make That Spare =

- Presented by: Johnny Johnston; Win Elliot; Chris Schenkel & Nelson Burton Jr.
- Country of origin: United States

Production
- Running time: 15 minutes

Original release
- Network: ABC
- Release: October 8, 1960 – September 11, 1964

Make That Spare is a fifteen-minute bowling program that was broadcast on ABC from October 8, 1960, to September 11, 1964.

== Broadcast history ==
The series was hosted by the former actor and nightclub singer Johnny Johnston, except in the 1961-1962 season, when Win Elliot hosted. Contestants were all members of the Professional Bowlers Association and wore their PBA bowling shirt uniforms.

The program was consistently paired with Fight of the Week, a weekly network broadcast of ten-round boxing matches, hosted by Don Dunphy. The fights were broadcast by WABC, Channel 7 in New York City, beginning at 10:00pm Eastern time. On most nights, the fights lasted until 10:45pm. To fill the available fifteen minutes before 11pm, ABC broadcast Make That Spare. If the fights ran late, Make That Spare was pre-empted. (Jackpot Bowling, a bowling show on NBC, followed the same scheduling format during its 1959-60 airings; that show was likewise tied to Fight of the Week's predecessor, Gillette Cavalcade of Sports Friday Night Fight.) The program was broadcast live from the Paramus Bowling Center in Paramus, New Jersey; the show's varying time slot was adjusted through how much time the contestants were given to banter or to prepare for each shot (the game had to be moved along more quickly if a boxing match ran late). Miller High Life and Kool cigarettes were the show's sponsors.

The professional bowler Don Carter made history on October 28, 1961, when he was the first to convert the 6-7-8-10 sweepstakes spare. For his efforts, he was rewarded with the grand prize of $19,000. Carter made the same split four episodes later, winning another $8,000. Monroe Moore also made the 6-7-8-10 spare and held the program's record by winning nine weeks in a row.

Make That Spare was ABC's first foray into televised bowling. The network began showing full PBA bowling matches in 1962 and eventually the Professional Bowlers Tour, which showed regular contests on the network until Disney took over ABC in 1997. Because Make That Spare was inextricably tied to Fight of the Week, that show's cancellation also led to Make That Spare ending.

=== Game play ===
Each bowler was given a series of pin configurations and one roll of the bowling ball to knock down all the pins and convert the (hypothetical) spare. As the bowlers progressed, the spares became more challenging and the point values increased. Each frame was configured as follows:

1. The "dinner bucket": pins 2-4-5-8, worth 25 points.
2. The "clothesline": pins 1-2-4-7, worth 25 points.
3. The "steam fitter": a 4-5 split, worth 50 points.
4. The "washout": pins 1-2-4-10, worth 50 points.
5. The 5-7 split: worth 100 points.

The highest scorer won $1,000 and the right to convert a "sweepstakes spare" worth a minimum of $5,000; making all five spares in the main game earned an additional $1,000 bonus. The loser also received a check for a lesser, unspecified "loser's share". In early seasons, the sweepstakes spare was always the 6-7-8-10; this was later changed to a randomly chosen spare. If this spare was not converted on a given program, $1,000 was added for the following week until won. In 1964, making the sweepstakes spare won a Ford Mustang. The winner of each weekly episode also earned the right to return the following week to defend his championship against a new challenger.

There was some controversy over the selection of spares, as the arrangements were not reversed for left-handed bowlers. (The chosen configurations of the "clothesline" and "washout", as well as the sweepstakes spare, are all easier for right-handed bowlers to convert.) This is mentioned on one of the extant episodes of the series.

== Revival attempts ==
=== 1988 pilot ===
The program was shown as a one-time special on March 12, 1988, with Chris Schenkel and Nelson Burton Jr. as the commentators, before that day's live PBA match on ABC's long-running Saturday afternoon series Pro Bowlers Tour. This special was the pilot for ABC when they considered remaking Make That Spare as a series during the 1989 PBA season but the series never materialized.

== Episode status ==
The series was never copyrighted and extant episodes from the 1960s run are thus in the public domain. Three episodes are known to exist; the March 27, 1964 episode with Roger Helle bowling against Dick Weber, the May 8, 1964 episode with Bud Hodgson facing J.B. Blaylock, and the July 24, 1964 episode with Jim Schroeder competing against Jerry McCoy.

As the program was broadcast live, it is not known as to how many episodes survive.
