= Sing Along with Mitch =

- Inspired by: Sing Along with Mitch (album) by Mitch Miller album series
- Original language: English

Original release
- Network: NBC
- Release: January 27, 1961 – 1964

Sing Along with Mitch was a music television show, led by choral director Mitch Miller, that ran from 1961 to 1964. Each episode consisted of Miller's male chorus singing old, familiar standards, along with famous songs from movies and Broadway shows. Certain episodes had a theme (holidays, vaudeville, romance, the circus, etc.) and the hour's musical selections would be staged according to the theme. The emphasis was on the men's voices, usually accompanied by only an accordion and a rhythm section.

== Format ==
At the start and end of each episode, lyrics to songs were shown at the bottom of the television screen, hence the Sing Along title, but no bouncing ball on television. (There was a bouncing ball going over the words in the theatrically-released Screen Songs and Song Cartunes cartoons.)

Three of the singers were given comedy segments in the series, as of September 1961. Ken Schoen, Hubert Hendrie, and Stan Carlson were known as The Vocalamities.

Bob McGrath, a tenor who later played Bob Johnson on Sesame Street from 1969 to 2016, made his television debut on this show as one of the soloists.

Miller also gave solo singing spots to baritone Keith Booth as well as female singers Diana Trask, Mary Lou Ryhal, and Leslie Uggams among others. Musical specialties were played by pianist Dick Hyman or accordionist Dominic Cortese.

Later shows also benefited from occasional guest stars like Shirley Temple, George Burns, and Milton Berle. They would perform songs they had popularized over the years, joined by the sing-along gang.

=== Mystery guests ===
In later seasons, the male chorus was supplemented by unannounced mystery guests in the sing-along finales. Celebrities were paid $500 for participating: among them Ray Bolger, Red Buttons, Johnny Carson, Wally Cox, Buddy Hackett, Jerry Lewis, and Joe E. Ross (in his police uniform from the Car 54, Where Are You? series). Only former United States President Harry Truman turned down the offer in the first season. Frank Lovejoy appeared in one finale, but died before the episode aired. A new finale was recorded and aired.

== Production ==
The series was inspired by the popular Sing Along with Mitch album series. During one week in 1958, the top three albums were Sing Along with Mitch, More Sing Along with Mitch, and Christmas Sing Along with Mitch. A May 1961 test broadcast received more than 20,000 positive letters and telegrams, billed as "one of the largest totals in TV history."

Miller cast his choir for their voices, explaining "if a guy's bald or if he's fat, that's the way he'll appear on the show. I think that the audience likes it that way." He noted that the singers took a longer time to rehearse than trained dancers, but that viewers could identify with them better than "Adonises."

At his first rehearsal for television, Miller took his position in front of the chorus and began conducting in the usual choirmaster manner: arms outstretched with hands gesturing, so the singers could see his signals. The TV director stopped him, objecting that Miller's arms were out of the camera's range and could not be seen on the television screen. Miller pulled his arms closer to his body, but the director stopped him once more. It was not until Miller's elbows were almost touching his body, and his arms extremely restricted, that the director was satisfied. Miller dutifully adopted the jerky, confined style of conducting and kept it for the duration of the series.

== Broadcast history ==
The program was initially seen every second Friday at 9 p.m., alternating with the Bell Telephone Hour. By September 1961, it moved to Thursdays at 10 p.m., airing weekly.

By January 1964, Broadcasting magazine was predicting that the series would be cancelled due to low ratings, and the change of the music scene (the forthcoming British Invasion).

== Legacy ==
In October 1961, a Sing Along with Mitch book was published.

== Reunion ==
In 1980 NBC network chief Fred Silverman wanted to commemorate the 20th anniversary of Sing Along with Mitch, with the possibility of turning the special into a series. Miller reunited many members of his 1961 gang, including singers Bob McGrath, Bill Ventura, Andy Love, Keith Booth, Stan Carlson, and Paul Friesen, and accordionist Dominic Cortese. Many behind-the-scenes crew members returned, including director Marcia Kuyper Schneider, writer-producer Gordon Cotler, and choreographers James Starbuck and Victor Griffin. Miller taped the special in New York. Silverman arranged for Irene Cara, then starring in NBC's hit series Fame, to appear as a guest star. She had two specialty numbers: her hit single "Out Here on My Own" and a song-and-dance number alongside choreographer Griffin. The show aired in January 1981, and while it was a faithful re-creation of the 1960s program, it did not get picked up as a series.
