= 1958–59 United States network television schedule =

The following is the 1958–59 network television schedule for the three major English language commercial broadcast networks in the United States. The schedule covers primetime hours from September 1958 through March 1959. The schedule is followed by a list per network of returning series, new series, and series cancelled after the 1957–58 season.

According to television historians Castleman and Podrazik (1982), the networks' schedules were thrown "into complete chaos" by the quiz show scandals that erupted during the later months of 1958. At first only one series, Dotto, was implicated in the game-fixing charges. Ed Hilgemeier, a contestant on the program, filed a complaint with the show's sponsor, Colgate-Palmolive. Colgate withdrew its sponsorship of the Tuesday evening (on NBC) and daytime (on CBS) versions of Dotto halfway through the summer, and the show did not appear on either network's fall 1958 schedule.

The $64,000 Challenge (on CBS) similarly did not appear that fall, and by November, The $64,000 Question (also CBS) and Twenty-One (NBC) were also removed from the network schedules, amidst accusations of game rigging. NBC's primetime Tic-Tac-Dough lasted through December. According to Castleman and Podrazik, "NBC and CBS were adamant in their own statements of innocence" since they only aired, and did not produce, the rigged series. They also claimed the cancellations were due to low ratings, not because of game-fixing accusations. ABC had few game shows on its 1958–59 schedule, and "eagerly pointed out" its innocence in the quiz show mess. The network affirmed its commitment to Westerns, which could not be rigged.

Western TV series continued to be popular with audiences, and for the first time, the three highest-rated programs on television, CBS's Gunsmoke and, Have Gun – Will Travel alongside NBC's Wagon Train were all Westerns. ABC's new series, The Rifleman even hit #4, quite a feat for a network which had had no series in the top 30 five years earlier.

Although ABC, CBS, and NBC remained the largest television networks in the United States, they were not the only companies operating television networks during this era. In May 1958, Ely Landau, president of the NTA Film Network, announced an NTA Film Network schedule for the 1958–59 season. The schedule consisted of three and a half hours of programs on Friday nights: Man Without a Gun at 7:30, followed by This is Alice at 8:00, then How to Marry a Millionaire at 8:30, and Premiere Performance, a package of films from the network's minority shareholder 20th Century Fox, from 9:00 to 11:00. Although the NTA Film Network had over 100 affiliate stations, only 17 agreed to air the Friday night schedule "in pattern" (during the scheduled time). Other NTA Network affiliates carried the network's programs whenever they had available slots, and outside of Gun, Alice, Millionaire and Performance, NTA's programs were aired whenever the local stations preferred. National Educational Television (NET), the predecessor to PBS founded in 1952, also allowed its affiliate stations to air programs out of pattern.

Each of the 30 highest-rated shows is listed with its rank and rating as determined by Nielsen Media Research.

== Legend ==
- Light blue indicates local programming.
- Gray indicates encore programming.
- Blue-gray indicates news programming.
- Light green indicates sporting events.
- Red indicates series being burned off and other irregularly scheduled programs, including specials and movies.
- Light gold indicates programming produced outside of the United States.
- highlight Lime highlights indicates the number-one most watched program of the season.
- highlight Yellow highlights indicates the top-10 most watched programs of the season.
- highlight Cyan highlights indicates numbers 11-20 most watched programs of the season.
- highlight Magenta highlights indicates numbers 21-30 most watched programs of the season.
- highlight Highlights indicates that it falls in multiple of the above categories.

== Schedule ==
- New series are highlighted in **bold**.
- All times are U.S. Eastern and Pacific time (except for some live sports or events). Subtract one hour for Central and Mountain times.

=== Sunday ===
Network		7:00 p.m.	7:30 p.m.	8:00 p.m.	8:30 p.m.	9:00 p.m.	9:30 p.m.	10:00 p.m.	10:30 p.m.
ABC	Fall	You Asked For It	Maverick (6/30.4)		**The Lawman** (27/26.0)	Colt .45	**Encounter**		Local programming
ABC	November	You Asked For It	Maverick (6/30.4)		**The Lawman** (27/26.0)	Colt .45	Local programming		
ABC	Winter	You Asked For It	Maverick (6/30.4)		**The Lawman** (27/26.0)	Colt .45	Deadline for Action (R)		Local programming
CBS	Fall	Lassie	The Jack Benny Program / Bachelor Father (Note: Both programs aired on alternating weeks)	The Ed Sullivan Show		General Electric Theater (25/26.7) (Tied with Name That Tune)	Alfred Hitchcock Presents (24/26.8)	The $64,000 Question	What's My Line?
CBS	November	Lassie	The Jack Benny Program / Bachelor Father	The Ed Sullivan Show		General Electric Theater (25/26.7) (Tied with Name That Tune)	Alfred Hitchcock Presents (24/26.8)	Keep Talking	What's My Line?
CBS	February	Lassie	The Jack Benny Program / Bachelor Father	The Ed Sullivan Show		General Electric Theater (25/26.7) (Tied with Name That Tune)	Alfred Hitchcock Presents (24/26.8)	Richard Diamond, Private Detective	What's My Line?
CBS	June	Lassie	That's My Boy (R)	The Ed Sullivan Show		General Electric Theater (25/26.7) (Tied with Name That Tune)	Alfred Hitchcock Presents (24/26.8)	Richard Diamond, Private Detective	What's My Line?
NBC	Fall	Saber of London	**Northwest Passage** (In COLOR)	The Steve Allen Show (In COLOR)		The Dinah Shore Chevy Show (In COLOR)		The Loretta Young Show	Local programming
NBC	Winter	Saber of London	**The Music Shop** (In COLOR)	The Steve Allen Show (In COLOR)		The Dinah Shore Chevy Show (In COLOR)		The Loretta Young Show	Local programming
NBC	Mid-spring	Saber of London	The Steve Allen Show (In COLOR)		**Pete Kelly's Blues**	The Dinah Shore Chevy Show (In COLOR)		The Loretta Young Show	Local programming
NBC	Summer	Midwestern Hayride (In COLOR)	Suspicion (R)		Dragnet	The Chevy Show (In COLOR)		The Loretta Young Show	Local programming

Notes:

- The Canadian-produced anthology series Encounter aired only five episodes on ABC before cancellation.
- Deadline for Action on ABC consisted of reruns of episodes that starred Dane Clark of the 1956–1957 series Wire Service.
- From February to September 1959, Richard Diamond, Private Detective, starring David Janssen, aired for a third and final season on CBS, on the Sunday schedule at 10 p.m. Eastern. It switched to NBC and returned to the air for a fourth season during the 1959–60 television season.

=== Monday ===
Network		7:00 p.m.	7:30 p.m.	8:00 p.m.	8:30 p.m.	9:00 p.m.	9:30 p.m.	10:00 p.m.	10:30 p.m.
ABC	Fall	Local programming (7:00) / **ABC News** (7:15) (Note: Aired in some markets at 6:45 p.m.)	Polka Go-Round		Bold Journey	The Voice of Firestone	Anybody Can Play	This is Music	John Daly and the News (10:30) / Local programming (10:45)
ABC	December	Local programming (7:00) / **ABC News** (7:15)	Tales of the Texas Rangers	Polka Go-Round	Bold Journey	The Voice of Firestone	Anybody Can Play	**The Patti Page Oldsmobile Show**	John Daly and the News (10:30) / Local programming (10:45)
ABC	Late winter	Local programming (7:00) / **ABC News** (7:15)	Tales of the Texas Rangers	Polka Go-Round	Bold Journey	The Voice of Firestone	Dr. I.Q.	**The Patti Page Oldsmobile Show**	John Daly and the News (10:30) / Local programming (10:45)
ABC	Spring	Local programming (7:00) / **ABC News** (7:15)	Tales of the Texas Rangers	Polka Go-Round	Bold Journey	The Voice of Firestone	This is Music	**The Patti Page Oldsmobile Show**	John Daly and the News (10:30) / Local programming (10:45)
ABC	Summer	Local programming (7:00) / **ABC News** (7:15)	Polka Go-Round		Bold Journey	Pantomime Quiz	Top Pro Golf		John Daly and the News (10:30) / Local programming (10:45)
CBS	Fall	Local programming (7:00) / Douglas Edwards with the News (7:15)	Name That Tune (25/26.7) (Tied with General Electric Theater)	**The Texan** (15/28.2)	Father Knows Best (13/28.3) (Tied with Zane Grey Theater)	The Danny Thomas Show (5/32.8)	**The Ann Sothern Show** (21/27.0) (Tied with Sugarfoot and The Perry Como Show)	**Westinghouse Desilu Playhouse**	
CBS	Summer	Local programming (7:00) / Douglas Edwards with the News (7:15)	Name That Tune (25/26.7) (Tied with General Electric Theater)	**The Texan** (15/28.2)	Father Knows Best (13/28.3) (Tied with Zane Grey Theater)	Frontier Justice	The Joseph Cotten Show (R)	**Westinghouse Desilu Playhouse**	
NBC	Fall	Local programming (7:00) / Huntley-Brinkley Report (7:15)	Tic-Tac-Dough (In COLOR)	The Restless Gun	Tales of Wells Fargo (7/30.2)	**Peter Gunn** (16/28.0) (Tied with Wanted: Dead or Alive)	Alcoa Theatre / Goodyear Television Playhouse	The Arthur Murray Party (In COLOR)	Local programming
NBC	Winter	Local programming (7:00) / Huntley-Brinkley Report (7:15)	Buckskin	The Restless Gun	Tales of Wells Fargo (7/30.2)	**Peter Gunn** (16/28.0) (Tied with Wanted: Dead or Alive)	Alcoa Theatre / Goodyear Television Playhouse	The Arthur Murray Party (In COLOR)	Local programming

Note:

- **The Westinghouse Lucille Ball-Desi Arnaz Show** aired once a month at 10–11 p.m. Summer reruns aired as The Lucy-Desi Comedy Hour.

=== Tuesday ===
Network		7:00 p.m.	7:30 p.m.	8:00 p.m.	8:30 p.m.	9:00 p.m.	9:30 p.m.	10:00 p.m.	10:30 p.m.
ABC	Fall	Local programming (7:00) / **ABC News** (7:15)	**The Cheyenne Show: Bronco** (18/27.9) / Sugarfoot (21/27.0) (Tied with The Ann Sothern Show and The Perry Como Show)		The Life and Legend of Wyatt Earp (10/29.1)	**The Rifleman** (4/33.1)	**Naked City**	Confession	John Daly and the News (10:30) / Local programming (10:45)
ABC	Winter	Local programming (7:00) / **ABC News** (7:15)	**The Cheyenne Show: Bronco** (18/27.9) / Sugarfoot (21/27.0) (Tied with The Ann Sothern Show and The Perry Como Show)		The Life and Legend of Wyatt Earp (10/29.1)	**The Rifleman** (4/33.1)	**Naked City**	**Alcoa Presents: One Step Beyond**	John Daly and the News (10:30) / Local programming (10:45)
CBS	Fall	Local programming (7:00) / Douglas Edwards with the News (7:15)	**Stars in Action** (R)	Keep Talking	To Tell the Truth	**The Arthur Godfrey Show**	The Red Skelton Show (In COLOR) (12/28.5)	**The Garry Moore Show**	
CBS	Mid-fall	Local programming (7:00) / Douglas Edwards with the News (7:15)	**Stars in Action** (R)	**The Invisible Man**	To Tell the Truth	**The Arthur Godfrey Show**	The Red Skelton Show (In COLOR) (12/28.5)	**The Garry Moore Show**	
CBS	Summer	Local programming (7:00) / Douglas Edwards with the News (7:15)	**Stars in Action** (R)	**Mystery Playhouse**	To Tell the Truth	**Peck's Bad Girl**	The Red Skelton Show (In COLOR) (12/28.5)	**The Andy Williams Show**	
NBC	Fall	Local programming (7:00) / Huntley-Brinkley Report (7:15)	Dragnet	The George Gobel Show (In COLOR) / The Eddie Fisher Show (In COLOR)		Colgate Theatre	The Bob Cummings Show	The Californians	Local programming
NBC	Late fall	Local programming (7:00) / Huntley-Brinkley Report (7:15)	Dragnet	The George Gobel Show (In COLOR) / The Eddie Fisher Show (In COLOR)		**The George Burns Show**	The Bob Cummings Show	The Californians	Local programming
NBC	Summer	Local programming (7:00) / Huntley-Brinkley Report (7:15)	**Northwest Passage** (R) (In COLOR)	**Steve Canyon** (R)	**The Jimmie Rodgers Show** (In COLOR)	**Fanfare**	The Bob Cummings Show	**The David Niven Show**	Local programming

Notes:

- **Bronco** was a replacement for Cheyenne, which had temporarily ceased production as Clint Walker walked out of the series.
- Confession, with host Jack Wyatt, which had begun as a local program in the Dallas, Texas, market in early 1957, premiered as a summer replacement on ABC on June 19, 1958, in advance of the 1958–59 television season. It ended on January 13, 1959, and was succeeded on January 20, 1959, by the paranormal anthology series **Alcoa Presents: One Step Beyond**.
- **Stars in Action** consisted of repeats of assorted anthology series.
- **Number Please** was supposed to premiere on CBS on September 30, 1958, but it was pulled at the last minute.

=== Wednesday ===
Network		7:00 p.m.	7:30 p.m.	8:00 p.m.	8:30 p.m.	9:00 p.m.	9:30 p.m.	10:00 p.m.	10:30 p.m.
ABC	Fall	Local programming (7:00) / **ABC News** (7:15)	Lawrence Welk's Plymouth Show		The Adventures of Ozzie and Harriet	**The Donna Reed Show**	**The Patti Page Oldsmobile Show**	The Wednesday Night Fights	
ABC	December	Local programming (7:00) / **ABC News** (7:15)	Lawrence Welk's Plymouth Show		The Adventures of Ozzie and Harriet	**The Donna Reed Show**	**Accused**	The Wednesday Night Fights	
ABC	Summer	Local programming (7:00) / **ABC News** (7:15)	**Music For a Summer Night**		The Adventures of Ozzie and Harriet	**The Donna Reed Show**	**Accused**	The Wednesday Night Fights	
CBS	Fall	Local programming (7:00) / Douglas Edwards with the News (7:15)	**Twilight Theater** (R)	**Pursuit**		The Millionaire (30/25.6)	I've Got a Secret (9/29.8)	Armstrong Circle Theatre / The United States Steel Hour	
CBS	Summer	Local programming (7:00) / Douglas Edwards with the News (7:15)	**Twilight Theater** (R)	Keep Talking	Trackdown	The Millionaire (30/25.6)	I've Got a Secret (9/29.8)	**Armstrong by Request** (R) / The United States Steel Hour	
NBC	Fall	Local programming (7:00) / Huntley-Brinkley Report (7:15)	Wagon Train (2/36.1)		The Price is Right (In COLOR) (11/28.6)	**Milton Berle starring in the Kraft Music Hall** (In COLOR) (Note: Formerly known as The Milton Berle Show)	**Bat Masterson**	This Is Your Life (29/25.8)	Local programming
NBC	Summer	Local programming (7:00) / Huntley-Brinkley Report (7:15)	Wagon Train (2/36.1)		The Price is Right (In COLOR) (11/28.6)	**The Dave King Show** (In COLOR)	**Bat Masterson**	This Is Your Life (29/25.8)	Local programming

Notes:

- **Twilight Theater** consisted of reruns of assorted anthology series.
- On CBS, **Armstrong by Request** aired in place of Armstrong Circle Theatre from July 8 to September 16, 1959, alternating with United States Steel Hour, consisting of reruns of six documentary dramas which originally had aired on Armstrong Circle Theatre during the 1958–1959 season.

=== Thursday ===
Network		7:00 p.m.	7:30 p.m.	8:00 p.m.	8:30 p.m.	9:00 p.m.	9:30 p.m.	10:00 p.m.	10:30 p.m.
ABC	Fall	Local programming (7:00) / **ABC News** (7:15)	Leave It to Beaver	Zorro	The Real McCoys (8/30.1)	The Pat Boone Chevy Showroom	**The Rough Riders**	Traffic Court	John Daly and the News (10:30) / Local programming (10:45)
ABC	Summer	Local programming (7:00) / **ABC News** (7:15)	Local programming	Zorro	The Real McCoys (8/30.1)	Leave It to Beaver (R)	**The Rough Riders**	Local programming	John Daly and the News (10:30) / Local programming (10:45)
CBS	Fall	Local programming (7:00) / Douglas Edwards with the News (7:15)	I Love Lucy (R)	December Bride	**Yancy Derringer**	Dick Powell's Zane Grey Theatre (13/28.3) (Tied with Father Knows Best)	Playhouse 90		
CBS	Summer	Local programming (7:00) / Douglas Edwards with the News (7:15)	**The Invisible Man**	December Bride	**Yancy Derringer**	Dick Powell's Zane Grey Theatre (13/28.3) (Tied with Father Knows Best)	Playhouse 90		
NBC	Fall	Local programming (7:00) / Huntley-Brinkley Report (7:15)	Jefferson Drum	**The Ed Wynn Show**	Twenty-One	**Behind Closed Doors**	The Ford Show (20/27.2) (In COLOR)	You Bet Your Life	Masquerade Party (In COLOR)
NBC	October	Local programming (7:00) / Huntley-Brinkley Report (7:15)	Jefferson Drum	**The Ed Wynn Show**	Concentration	**Behind Closed Doors**	The Ford Show (20/27.2) (In COLOR)	You Bet Your Life	Masquerade Party (In COLOR)
NBC	November	Local programming (7:00) / Huntley-Brinkley Report (7:15)	Jefferson Drum	**The Ed Wynn Show**	It Could Be You	**Behind Closed Doors**	The Ford Show (20/27.2) (In COLOR)	You Bet Your Life	Masquerade Party (In COLOR)
NBC	Winter	Local programming (7:00) / Huntley-Brinkley Report (7:15)	Jefferson Drum	**Steve Canyon**	It Could Be You	**Behind Closed Doors**	The Ford Show (20/27.2) (In COLOR)	You Bet Your Life	Masquerade Party (In COLOR)
NBC	Spring	Local programming (7:00) / Huntley-Brinkley Report (7:15)	Jefferson Drum	**The Lawless Years**	**Oldsmobile Music Theatre**	**Laugh Line**	The Ford Show (20/27.2) (In COLOR)	You Bet Your Life	Masquerade Party (In COLOR)
NBC	Summer	Local programming (7:00) / Huntley-Brinkley Report (7:15)	Jefferson Drum	**The Lawless Years**	**Too Young to Go Steady**	**Laugh Line**	**21 Beacon Street**	You Bet Your Life	Masquerade Party (In COLOR)
NTA		Local programming				**Jazz Party**			Local programming

- The 90-minute series Jazz Party aired from May 8 to December 25, 1958, on WNTA-TV Thursdays at 9pm ET and was offered to NTA Film Network affiliates during the 1958 fall season. It was a successor to a similar program on the NYC DuMont station WABD, Art Ford's Greenwich Village Party, as the DuMont Network was ceasing operations.

=== Friday ===
Network		7:00 p.m.	7:30 p.m.	8:00 p.m.	8:30 p.m.	9:00 p.m.	9:30 p.m.	10:00 p.m.	10:30 p.m.
ABC	Fall	Local programming (7:00) / **ABC News** (7:15)	The Adventures of Rin Tin Tin	Walt Disney Presents		**Man with a Camera**	**77 Sunset Strip**		John Daly and the News (10:30) / Local programming (10:45)
ABC	March	Local programming (7:00) / **ABC News** (7:15)	The Adventures of Rin Tin Tin	Walt Disney Presents		Tombstone Territory	**77 Sunset Strip**		John Daly and the News (10:30) / Local programming (10:45)
CBS	Fall	Local programming (7:00) / Douglas Edwards with the News (7:15)	Your Hit Parade	Trackdown	**The Jackie Gleason Show**	The Phil Silvers Show	Schlitz Playhouse / **Lux Playhouse**	The Lineup	Person to Person
CBS	Winter	Local programming (7:00) / Douglas Edwards with the News (7:15)	Your Hit Parade	**Rawhide** (28/25.9)		The Phil Silvers Show	Schlitz Playhouse / **Lux Playhouse**	The Lineup	Person to Person
CBS	Summer	Local programming (7:00) / Douglas Edwards with the News (7:15)	**Rawhide** (R)		I Love Lucy (R)	The Phil Silvers Show	Schlitz Playhouse / **Lux Playhouse**	The Lineup	The Original Amateur Hour
NBC	Fall	Local programming (7:00) / Huntley-Brinkley Report (7:15)	Buckskin	**The Further Adventures of Ellery Queen** (In COLOR)		M Squad	The Thin Man	Gillette Cavalcade of Sports (10:00) / **Fight Beat** (10:45)	
NBC	Winter	Local programming (7:00) / Huntley-Brinkley Report (7:15)	**Northwest Passage** (In COLOR)	**The Further Adventures of Ellery Queen** (In COLOR)		M Squad	The Thin Man	Gillette Cavalcade of Sports (10:00) / **Phillies Jackpot Bowling** (10:45)	
NBC	Summer	Local programming (7:00) / Huntley-Brinkley Report (7:15)	**Pete Kelly's Blues** (R)	**The Further Adventures of Ellery Queen** (In COLOR)		M Squad	**Colgate Western Theatre** (R)	Gillette Cavalcade of Sports (10:00) / **Phillies Jackpot Bowling** (10:45)	
NTA		Local programming	Man Without a Gun	**This is Alice**	How to Marry a Millionaire	Premiere Performance			

Notes:

- On January 9, **Phillies Jackpot Bowling** premiered in the 10:45-11 p.m. spot on NBC.
- On March 13 Tombstone Territory replaced **Man with a Camera** on the ABC schedule.
- On NBC, the summer anthology series Colgate Western Theatre consisted of repeats of Western dramas originally aired on other anthology series, primarily General Electric Theatre and Schlitz Playhouse.

=== Saturday ===
Network		7:30 p.m.	8:00 p.m.	8:30 p.m.	9:00 p.m.	9:30 p.m.	10:00 p.m.	10:30 p.m.
ABC	Fall	The Dick Clark Saturday Night Beech-Nut Show	The Billy Graham Crusade		Lawrence Welk's Dodge Dancing Party		**Sammy Kaye's Music from Manhattan**	Local programming
ABC	November	The Dick Clark Saturday Night Beech-Nut Show	Jubilee USA		Lawrence Welk's Dodge Dancing Party		**Sammy Kaye's Music from Manhattan**	Local programming
ABC	Winter	The Dick Clark Saturday Night Beech-Nut Show	Jubilee USA		Lawrence Welk's Dodge Dancing Party		The Billy Graham Crusade	
ABC	Summer	The Dick Clark Saturday Night Beech-Nut Show	Jubilee USA		Lawrence Welk's Dodge Dancing Party		Local programming	
CBS	Fall	Perry Mason (19/27.5)		**Wanted Dead or Alive** (16/28.0) (Tied with Peter Gunn)	The Gale Storm Show	Have Gun – Will Travel (3/34.3)	Gunsmoke (1/39.6)	Local programming
CBS	Late spring	Perry Mason (19/27.5)		**Wanted Dead or Alive** (16/28.0) (Tied with Peter Gunn)	The Gale Storm Show	Have Gun – Will Travel (3/34.3)	Gunsmoke (1/39.6)	**Markham**
CBS	Summer	**Reckoning**		**Wanted Dead or Alive** (16/28.0) (Tied with Peter Gunn)	**Brenner**	Have Gun – Will Travel (3/34.3)	Gunsmoke (1/39.6)	**Markham**
NBC	Fall	People are Funny	The Perry Como Show (21/27.0) (Tied with Sugarfoot and The Ann Sothern Show) (In COLOR)		**Steve Canyon**	**Cimarron City**		**Brains & Brawn**
NBC	Winter	People are Funny	The Perry Como Show (21/27.0) (Tied with Sugarfoot and The Ann Sothern Show) (In COLOR)		**Black Saddle**	**Cimarron City**		**The D.A.'s Man**
NBC	Summer	People are Funny	**Perry Como Presents** (In COLOR)		**Black Saddle**	**Cimarron City**		**The D.A.'s Man**

Notes:

- On NBC, **Brains & Brawn** was replaced on January 3, 1959, by **The D.A.'s Man**.
- On CBS, **Markham** premiered Saturday, May 2, 1959, at 10:30 pm.

== By network ==
=== ABC ===
Returning Series

- The Adventures of Ozzie and Harriet
- The Adventures of Rin Tin Tin
- Anybody Can Play/Anyone Can Play
- The Billy Graham Crusade
- Bold Journey
- Cheyenne
- Colt .45
- Confession
- Dick Clark's Saturday Night Beach-Nut Show
- Dr. I.Q.
- John Daly and the News
- Jubilee USA
- Lawrence Welk's Dodge Dancing Party
- Lawrence Welk's Plymouth Show
- Leave It to Beaver (moved from CBS)
- The Life and Legend of Wyatt Earp
- Maverick
- Pantomime Quiz
- The Pat Boone Chevy Showroom
- The Patti Page Oldsmobile Show
- Polka Go-Round
- The Real McCoys
- Sugarfoot
- Tales of the Texas Rangers
- This is Music
- Tombstone Territory
- Top Pro Golf
- Traffic Court
- The Voice of Firestone
- Walt Disney Presents
- The Wednesday Night Fights
- You Asked For It
- Zorro

New Series

- 77 Sunset Strip
- ABC News
- Accused *
- Alcoa Presents: One Step Beyond *
- Bronco
- The Donna Reed Show
- Encounter
- The Lawman
- Man with a Camera
- Music for a Summer Night *
- Naked City
- The Patti Page Oldsmobile Show
- The Rifleman
- Rough Riders
- Sammy Kaye's Music from Manhattan *

Not returning from 1957–58:

- Adventure at Scott Island
- The Adventures of Jim Bowie
- All-American Football Game of the Week
- American Odyssey
- The Betty White Show
- Bowling Stars
- Broken Arrow
- Campaign Roundup
- Circus Boy
- Cowtown Rodeo
- Country Music Jubilee
- Date with the Angels
- Disneyland
- Famous Fights
- The Frank Sinatra Show
- The Guy Mitchell Show
- Keep It in the Family
- Lawrence Welk's Top Tunes and New Talent
- Love That Jill
- Make Me Laugh
- Midwestern Hayride
- The Mike Wallace Interview
- Navy Log
- O.S.S.
- Open Hearing
- The Patrice Munsel Show
- Scotland Yard
- Telephone Time
- The Walter Winchell File
- The West Point Story

=== CBS ===
Returning Series

- The $64,000 Question
- Alfred Hitchcock Presents
- Armstrong Circle Theatre
- Bachelor Father
- The Danny Thomas Show
- December Bride
- Douglas Edwards and the News
- DuPont Show of the Month
- The Ed Sullivan Show
- Father Knows Best (moved from NBC)
- Frontier Justice
- The Gale Storm Show
- General Electric Theatre
- Gunsmoke
- Have Gun — Will Travel
- Keep Talking
- I've Got a Secret
- The Invisible Man
- The Jack Benny Program
- Lassie
- The Lineup
- The Millionaire
- Name That Tune
- Perry Mason
- Person to Person
- The Phil Silvers Show
- Playhouse 90
- The Red Skelton Show
- Richard Diamond, Private Detective
- Schlitz Playhouse
- The Spike Jones Show
- That's My Boy
- To Tell the Truth
- Trackdown
- The Twentieth Century
- The United States Steel Hour
- What's My Line
- Your Hit Parade (moved from NBC)
- Zane Grey Theater

New Series

- The Andy Williams Show
- The Ann Sothern Show
- Armstrong by Request *
- The Arthur Godfrey Show
- Brenner
- The Garry Moore Show *
- The Invisible Man
- The Jackie Gleason Show
- Lux Playhouse
- Markham *
- Peck's Bad Girl *
- Pursuit
- Rawhide *
- Stars in Action
- The Texan
- Trackdown
- Wanted Dead or Alive
- Westinghouse Desilu Playhouse
- Westinghouse Lucille Ball-Desi Arnaz Show
- Yancy Derringer

Not returning from 1957–58:

- The $64,000 Challenge
- The Adventures of Robin Hood
- Arthur Godfrey's Talent Scouts
- Assignment: Foreign Legion
- Bid 'n' Buy
- The Big Record
- The Boing Boing Show
- Climax!
- Dick and the Duchess
- The Eve Arden Show
- The George Burns and Gracie Allen Show
- Leave it to Beaver (moved to ABC)
- Mr. Adams and Eve
- Sergeant Preston of the Yukon
- Shower of Stars
- Studio One in Hollywood
- Tales of the Texas Rangers
- Top Dollar

=== NBC ===
Returning Series

- Alcoa Theatre
- The Arthur Murray Party
- Bachelor Father
- The Bob Cummings Show
- Buckskin
- The Californians
- Colgate Theatre
- Concentration
- The Dinah Shore Chevy Show
- Dragnet
- The Eddie Fisher Show
- Fight Beat
- The Ford Show
- The George Gobel Show
- Gillette Cavalcade of Sports
- Goodyear Television Playhouse
- The Huntley–Brinkley Report
- It Could Be You
- The Jack Benny Program
- The Loretta Young Show
- M Squad
- Masquerade Party
- Omnibus
- People Are Funny
- The Perry Como Show
- The Price Is Right
- The Restless Gun
- Saber of London
- The Steve Allen Show
- Tales of Wells Fargo
- The Thin Man
- This Is Your Life
- Tic-Tac-Dough
- Twenty-One
- Wagon Train
- You Bet Your Life

New Series

- 21 Beacon Street *
- The Adventures of Ellery Queen
- The Art Carney Special *
- Bat Masterson
- Behind Closed Doors
- Black Saddle *
- Brains & Brawn
- Cimarron City
- The D.A.'s Man *
- The David Niven Show *
- Fight Beat *
- The George Burns Show
- Milton Berle starring in the Kraft Music Hall
- Laugh Line *
- The Lawless Years *
- The Music Shop *
- Northwest Passage
- Oldsmobile Music Theatre *
- Pete Kelly's Blues *
- Peter Gunn
- Steve Canyon

Not returning from 1957–58:

- The Big Game
- The Bob Crosby Show
- Colgate Theatre
- Club Oasis with Spike Jones
- The Court of Last Resort
- Decision
- Dotto
- Dragnet
- Father Knows Best (Moved to CBS)
- The Gisele MacKenzie Show
- The Investigator
- It's a Great Life
- The Jane Wyman Show
- Kraft Television Theatre
- The Life of Riley
- The Lux Show Starring Rosemary Clooney
- Meet McGraw
- Music Bingo
- The Nat King Cole Show
- No Warning!
- The Original Amateur Hour
- The People's Choice
- Red Barber's Corner
- The Restless Gun
- The Steve Lawrence and Eydie Gormé Show
- The Subject is Jazz
- Suspicion
- Tic-Tac-Dough
- What's It For?
- Wide Wide World

=== NTA ===
Returning series

- How to Marry a Millionaire
- Man Without a Gun
- Premiere Performance

New series

- This is Alice

Note: The * indicates that the program was introduced in midseason.

== See also ==
- 1958–59 United States network television schedule (daytime)
- 1958–59 United States network television schedule (late night)
