= 1959–60 United States network television schedule =

US primetime network television schedule for the fall of 1959

The following is the 1959–60 network television schedule for the three major English language commercial broadcast networks in the United States. The schedule covers primetime hours from September 1959 through March 1960. The schedule is followed by a list per network of returning series, new series, and series cancelled after the 1958–59 season.

By the end of the 1950s, the three major U.S. television networks had basically given up direct control of their TV programs. According to TV historians Castleman and Podrazik (1982), ABC allowed Warner Brothers studios to fill 30% of its fall 1959 schedule. The networks "acted as mere conduits", with Warner, Talent Associates, Revue Studios, Ziv, Screen Gems, 20th Century-Fox, Goodson-Todman, and Desilu Studios producing nearly everything on the networks; with rare exceptions, only network news and sports were still produced in-house.

By fall 1959 what the Hollywood studios were producing were mostly Westerns. According to Castleman and Podrazik (1984), "the rush to Westerns had become a virtual stampede so that, by the fall of 1959, viewers had their choice from a staggering twenty-eight different Western-based prime time series." Westerns were popular with audiences, but critics lamented the loss of other program formats, which had quietly vanished from the three networks' schedules. The addition of Westerns and game shows came at the direct expense of the live dramatic anthology series seen during the Golden Age of Television.

The official schedule was set by each network before the start of the official fall season. The fall season is from September to November in the U.S. The mid-season schedule is listed under the official fall season lineup of each network. The mid-season schedule is from December 1959 to May 1960.

Each of the 30 highest-rated shows is listed with its rank and rating as determined by Nielsen Media Research.

== Legend ==
- Light blue indicates local programming.
- Gray indicates encore programming.
- Blue-gray indicates news programming.
- Light green indicates sporting events.
- Red indicates series being burned off and other irregularly scheduled programs, including specials and movies.
- Light gold indicates programming produced outside of the United States.
- highlight Lime highlights indicates the number-one most watched program of the season.
- highlight Yellow highlights indicates the top-10 most watched programs of the season.
- highlight Cyan highlights indicates numbers 11-20 most watched programs of the season.
- highlight Magenta highlights indicates numbers 21-30 most watched programs of the season.
- highlight Highlights indicates that it falls in multiple of the above categories.

== Schedule ==
- New series are highlighted in **bold**.
- All times are U.S. Eastern Time and Pacific Time (except for some live sports or events). Subtract one hour for Central, Mountain, Alaska and Hawaii–Aleutian times.

=== Sunday ===
Network		7:00 p.m.	7:30 p.m.	8:00 p.m.	8:30 p.m.	9:00 p.m.	9:30 p.m.	10:00 p.m.	10:30 p.m.
ABC	Fall	Colt .45	Maverick (19/25.2)		Lawman (15/26.2)	**The Rebel**	**The Alaskans**		**Dick Clark's World of Talent**
ABC	Winter	Colt .45	Maverick (19/25.2)		Lawman (15/26.2)	**The Rebel**	**The Alaskans**		21 Beacon Street (R)
ABC	Spring	Broken Arrow	Maverick (19/25.2)		Lawman (15/26.2)	**The Rebel**	**The Alaskans**		**Johnny Staccato**
CBS	Fall	Lassie (29/23.1) (Tied with The Perry Como Show)	**Dennis the Menace** (16/26.0)	The Ed Sullivan Show (12/28.0)		General Electric Theater (21/24.4) (Tied with Mr. Lucky and Zane Grey Theater)	Alfred Hitchcock Presents (25/24.1)	The Jack Benny Program / The George Gobel Show	What's My Line? (27/23.9)
CBS	Summer	Lassie (29/23.1) (Tied with The Perry Como Show)	**Dennis the Menace** (16/26.0)	The Ed Sullivan Show (12/28.0)		General Electric Theater (21/24.4) (Tied with Mr. Lucky and Zane Grey Theater)	Alfred Hitchcock Presents (25/24.1)	**Lucy in Connecticut** (R)	What's My Line? (27/23.9)
NBC	Fall	**Riverboat**		**NBC Sunday Showcase** (In COLOR)		The Dinah Shore Chevy Show (In COLOR)		The Loretta Young Show	Local programming
NBC	Late winter	**Overland Trail**		**NBC Sunday Showcase** (In COLOR)		The Dinah Shore Chevy Show (In COLOR)		The Loretta Young Show	Local programming
NBC	Summer	**Overland Trail**		**Music on Ice** (In COLOR)		**The Chevy Mystery Show** (In COLOR)		The Loretta Young Show	Local programming

Notes:

- Lucy in Connecticut consisted of reruns of I Love Lucy from the final 13 episodes of the 1956-57 season when the Lucy and Ricky Ricardo characters made their home in Westport, Connecticut.
- On ABC, 21 Beacon Street consisted of reruns of NBC's 1959 summer series.

=== Monday ===
Network		7:00 p.m.	7:30 p.m.	8:00 p.m.	8:30 p.m.	9:00 p.m.	9:30 p.m.	10:00 p.m.	10:30 p.m.
ABC		Local programming	Cheyenne (17/25.9)		**Bourbon Street Beat**		**Adventures in Paradise**		Man with a Camera
CBS	Fall	Local programming (7:00) / Douglas Edwards with the News (7:15)*	Masquerade Party	The Texan	Father Knows Best (6/29.7) (Tied with 77 Sunset Strip)	The Danny Thomas Show (4/31.1)	The Ann Sothern Show (24/24.2)	**Hennesey**	**The DuPont Show with June Allyson**
CBS	Winter	Local programming (7:00) / Douglas Edwards with the News (7:15)*	**The Kate Smith Show**	The Texan	Father Knows Best (6/29.7) (Tied with 77 Sunset Strip)	The Danny Thomas Show (4/31.1)	The Ann Sothern Show (24/24.2)	**Hennesey**	**The DuPont Show with June Allyson**
CBS	Summer	Local programming (7:00) / Douglas Edwards with the News (7:15)*	**The Kate Smith Show**	The Texan	Father Knows Best (6/29.7) (Tied with 77 Sunset Strip)	The Danny Thomas Show (4/31.1)	The Ann Sothern Show (24/24.2)	**New Comedy Showcase**	**The DuPont Show with June Allyson**
NBC	Fall	Local programming (7:00) / The Huntley-Brinkley Report (7:15)*	Richard Diamond, Private Detective	**Love and Marriage**	Tales of Wells Fargo	Peter Gunn	Alcoa Theatre / Goodyear Television Playhouse	The Steve Allen Plymouth Show** (In COLOR)	
NBC	Late winter	Local programming (7:00) / The Huntley-Brinkley Report (7:15)*	**Riverboat**		Tales of Wells Fargo	Peter Gunn	Alcoa Theatre / Goodyear Television Playhouse	The Steve Allen Plymouth Show** (In COLOR)	

(*) In some areas, Douglas Edwards with the News and The Huntley-Brinkley Report aired at 6:45 p.m. (**) Formerly known as The Steve Allen Show

Note:

- On CBS, the summer series New Comedy Showcase was an anthology series composed of unsold television pilots.

=== Tuesday ===
Network		7:00 p.m.	7:30 p.m.	8:00 p.m.	8:30 p.m.	9:00 p.m.	9:30 p.m.	10:00 p.m.	10:30 p.m.
ABC		Local programming	Sugarfoot / Bronco		The Life and Legend of Wyatt Earp (20/25.0)	The Rifleman (13/27.5)	**Philip Marlowe**	Alcoa Presents: One Step Beyond	Keep Talking
CBS	Fall	Local programming (7:00) / Douglas Edwards with the News (7:15)	Local programming	**The Dennis O'Keefe Show**	**The Many Loves of Dobie Gillis**	**Tightrope!**	The Red Skelton Show (Sporadically in COLOR) (5/30.8)	The Garry Moore Show	
CBS	Summer	Local programming (7:00) / Douglas Edwards with the News (7:15)	Local programming	Peck's Bad Girl (R)	**The Many Loves of Dobie Gillis**	**Tightrope!**	**The Comedy Spot**	**Diagnosis: Unknown**	
NBC	Fall	Local programming (7:00) / The Huntley-Brinkley Report (7:15)	**Laramie**		**Fibber McGee and Molly**	The Arthur Murray Party (In COLOR)	**Startime** (In COLOR)		Local programming
NBC	Spring	Local programming (7:00) / The Huntley-Brinkley Report (7:15)	**Laramie**		**Startime** (In COLOR)		The Arthur Murray Party (In COLOR)	M Squad	Local programming
NBC	Summer	Local programming (7:00) / The Huntley-Brinkley Report (7:15)	**Laramie**		**Gas Company Playhouse** / **NBC Playhouse** (alternating)	Richard Diamond, Private Detective	The Arthur Murray Party (In COLOR)	M Squad	Local programming

Notes:

- On CBS, the summer anthology series The Comedy Spot consisted of broadcasts of unsold television pilots and reruns of episodes of General Electric Theater and NBC's Colgate Theater.
- Gas Company Playhouse, hosted by Julia Meade, consisted of reruns of episodes of Goodyear Television Playhouse, The David Niven Show, Colgate Theater, and Alcoa Theatre.
- NBC Playhouse, hosted by Jeanne Bal, consisted of reruns of episodes of The Loretta Young Show in which Loretta Young had not starred.

=== Wednesday ===
Network		7:00 p.m.	7:30 p.m.	8:00 p.m.	8:30 p.m.	9:00 p.m.	9:30 p.m.	10:00 p.m.	10:30 p.m.
ABC	Fall	Local programming	The Court of Last Resort (R)	**Charley Weaver's Hobby Lobby**	The Adventures of Ozzie and Harriet	**Hawaiian Eye**		The Wednesday Night Fights	
ABC	Late winter	Local programming	Music For a Spring Night	**Charley Weaver's Hobby Lobby**	The Adventures of Ozzie and Harriet	**Hawaiian Eye**		The Wednesday Night Fights	
ABC	Spring	Local programming	Music For a Spring Night		The Adventures of Ozzie and Harriet	**Hawaiian Eye**		The Wednesday Night Fights	
ABC	Late spring	Local programming	Music For a Summer Night		The Adventures of Ozzie and Harriet	**Hawaiian Eye**		The Wednesday Night Fights	
CBS	Fall	Local programming (7:00) / Douglas Edwards with the News (7:15)	The Lineup		**Men into Space**	The Millionaire	I've Got a Secret (28/23.5)	Armstrong Circle Theatre / The United States Steel Hour	
CBS	Winter	Local programming (7:00) / Douglas Edwards with the News (7:15)	**Be Our Guest**		**Men into Space**	The Millionaire	I've Got a Secret (28/23.5)	Armstrong Circle Theatre / The United States Steel Hour	
NBC	Fall	Local programming (7:00) / The Huntley-Brinkley Report (7:15)	Wagon Train (2/38.4)		The Price Is Right (In COLOR) (8/29.2)	The Perry Como Show (29/23.1) (Tied with Lassie) (In COLOR)		This Is Your Life	**Wichita Town**
NBC	Summer	Local programming (7:00) / The Huntley-Brinkley Report (7:15)	Wagon Train (2/38.4)		The Price Is Right (In COLOR) (8/29.2)	**Happy**	**Tate**	This Is Your Life	**Wichita Town**

Note:

- On ABC, Music For a Spring Night was the summer 1959 series Music For a Summer Night renamed. It reverted to the name Music For a Summer Night in May 1960.

=== Thursday ===
Network		7:00 p.m.	7:30 p.m.	8:00 p.m.	8:30 p.m.	9:00 p.m.	9:30 p.m.	10:00 p.m.	10:30 p.m.
ABC	Fall	Local programming	The Gale Storm Show	The Donna Reed Show	The Real McCoys (11/28.2)	The Pat Boone Chevy Showroom	**The Untouchables**		**Take a Good Look**
ABC	Summer	Local programming	The Gale Storm Show	The Donna Reed Show	The Real McCoys (11/28.2)	The Jeannie Carson Show (R)	**The Untouchables**		**Take a Good Look**
CBS	Fall	Local programming (7:00) / Douglas Edwards with the News (7:15)	To Tell the Truth	**The Betty Hutton Show**	**Johnny Ringo**	Dick Powell's Zane Grey Theatre (21/24.4) (Tied with Mr. Lucky and General Electric Theater)	Playhouse 90 / **The Big Party**		
CBS	Winter	Local programming (7:00) / Douglas Edwards with the News (7:15)	To Tell the Truth	**The Betty Hutton Show**	**Johnny Ringo**	Dick Powell's Zane Grey Theatre (21/24.4) (Tied with Mr. Lucky and General Electric Theater)	Markham	**The Revlon Revue**	
CBS	Summer	Local programming (7:00) / Douglas Edwards with the News (7:15)	The Invisible Man	**The Betty Hutton Show**	**Johnny Ringo**	Dick Powell's Zane Grey Theatre (21/24.4) (Tied with Mr. Lucky and General Electric Theater)	Markham	**The Revlon Revue**	
NBC	Fall	Local programming (7:00) / The Huntley-Brinkley Report (7:15)	**Law of the Plainsman**	Bat Masterson	**Johnny Staccato***	Bachelor Father	The Ford Show (14/27.4) (In COLOR)	You Bet Your Life (26/24.0)	The Lawless Years
NBC	Summer	Local programming (7:00) / The Huntley-Brinkley Report (7:15)	**Law of the Plainsman**	Bat Masterson	**Johnny Staccato***	Bachelor Father	**Wrangler**	You Bet Your Life (26/24.0)	The Lawless Years

Note:

- The ABC 1960 summer series The Jeannie Carson Show consisted of reruns of the 1956-1957 CBS situation comedy Hey, Jeannie!
- Johnny Staccato later moved to ABC.

== Friday ==
Network		7:00 p.m.	7:30 p.m.	8:00 p.m.	8:30 p.m.	9:00 p.m.	9:30 p.m.	10:00 p.m.	10:30 p.m.
ABC		Local programming	Walt Disney Presents		The Man From Blackhawk	77 Sunset Strip (6/29.7) (Tied with Father Knows Best)		The Detectives Starring Robert Taylor	Black Saddle
CBS		Local programming (7:00) / Douglas Edwards with the News (7:15)	Rawhide (18/25.8)		Hotel de Paree	Westinghouse Desilu Playhouse		The Twilight Zone	Person to Person
NBC	Fall	Local programming (7:00) / The Huntley-Brinkley Report (7:15)	People Are Funny	The Troubleshooters	The Bell Telephone Hour (In COLOR)		M Squad	Gillette Cavalcade of Sports (10:00) / Phillies Jackpot Bowling (10:45)	
NBC	Winter	Local programming (7:00) / The Huntley-Brinkley Report (7:15)	People Are Funny	The Troubleshooters	The Bell Telephone Hour (In COLOR)		Masquerade Party	Gillette Cavalcade of Sports (10:00) / Phillies Jackpot Bowling (10:45)	

Notes:

- On CBS, The Westinghouse Lucille Ball-Desi Arnaz Show aired once a month at 9 p.m.
- On NBC, NBC Friday Night Special Presentation (In COLOR) aired once a month at 8:30 p.m.

== Saturday ==
Network		7:30 p.m.	8:00 p.m.	8:30 p.m.	9:00 p.m.	9:30 p.m.	10:00 p.m.	10:30 p.m.
ABC		Dick Clark's Saturday Night Beech-Nut Show	John Gunther's High Road	Leave It to Beaver	The Lawrence Welk Show		Jubilee USA	
CBS	Fall	Perry Mason (10/28.3)		Wanted Dead or Alive (9/28.7)	Mr. Lucky (21/24.4) (Tied with Zane Grey Theater and General Electric Theater)	Have Gun – Will Travel (3/34.7)	Gunsmoke (1/40.3)	Markham
CBS	Winter	Perry Mason (10/28.3)		Wanted Dead or Alive (9/28.7)	Mr. Lucky (21/24.4) (Tied with Zane Grey Theater and General Electric Theater)	Have Gun – Will Travel (3/34.7)	Gunsmoke (1/40.3)	Local programming
NBC	Fall	Bonanza (In COLOR)		The Man and the Challenge	The Deputy	Five Fingers		It Could Be You
NBC	Winter	Bonanza (In COLOR)		The Man and the Challenge	The Deputy	World Wide '60		Man from Interpol

== By network ==
=== ABC ===
Returning Series

- 77 Sunset Strip
- The Adventures of Ozzie and Harriet
- Alcoa Presents: One Step Beyond
- Black Saddle
- Broken Arrow
- Bronco
- Cheyenne
- Colt .45
- Dick Clark's Saturday Night Beach-Nut Show
- The Donna Reed Show
- The Gale Storm Show
- The Jeannie Carson Show
- Johnny Staccato (moved from NBC later this season)
- Jubilee USA
- Keep Talking
- Lawman
- The Lawrence Welk Show
- Leave It to Beaver
- The Life and Legend of Wyatt Earp
- Man with a Camera
- Maverick
- Music for a Spring Night
- Music for a Summer Night
- The Pat Boone Chevy Showroom
- The Rifleman
- Sugarfoot
- Walt Disney Presents
- The Wednesday Night Fights

New Series

- The Alaskans
- Black Saddle *
- Bourbon Street Beat
- Charley Weaver's Hobby Lobby
- The Detectives Starring Robert Taylor
- Dick Clark's World of Talent
- Hawaiian Eye
- John Gunther's High Road
- The Man from Blackhawk
- Matty's Funday Funnies
- Philip Marlowe
- Playhouse 90
- The Rebel
- Take a Good Look
- The United States Steel Hour
- The Untouchables
- Walter Cronkite with the News
- Wanted: Dead or Alive

Not returning from 1958–59:

- ABC News
- Accused
- Anybody Can Play/Anyone Can Play
- The Billy Graham Crusade
- Bold Journey
- Confession
- Deadline for Action
- Dr. I.Q.
- Encounter
- John Daly and the News
- Lawrence Welk's Dodge Dancing Party
- Lawrence Welk's Plymouth Show
- The Patti Page Oldsmobile Show
- Polka Go-Round
- Rough Riders
- Sammy Kaye's Music from Manhattan
- Tales of the Texas Rangers
- This is Music
- Traffic Court
- The Voice of Firestone
- Walt Disney Presents
- You Asked For It
- Zorro

=== CBS ===
Returning Series

- Alfred Hitchcock Presents
- Armstrong Circle Theatre
- The Ann Sothern Show
- Brenner
- The Danny Thomas Show
- Dick Powell's Zane Grey Theater
- Douglas Edwards with the News
- DuPont Show of the Month
- The Ed Sullivan Show
- Father Knows Best
- The Garry Moore Show
- General Electric Theater
- The George Gobel Show (moved from NBC)
- Gunsmoke
- Have Gun — Will Travel
- The Invisible Man
- I've Got a Secret
- The Jack Benny Program
- Lassie
- Leave It to Beaver
- The Lineup
- Markham
- Masquerade Party
- The Millionaire
- Perry Mason
- Peck's Bad Girl
- Person to Person
- Playhouse 90
- Rawhide
- The Red Skelton Show
- The Spike Jones Show
- The Texan
- To Tell the Truth
- The Twentieth Century
- The United States Steel Hour
- Westinghouse Desilu Playhouse
- The Westinghouse Lucille Ball and Desi Arnaz Show
- Wanted Dead or Alive
- What's My Line

New Series

- Be Our Guest *
- The Betty Hutton Show
- The Big Party
- Buick-Electra Playhouse
- The Comedy Spot *
- The Dennis O'Keefe Show
- Dennis the Menace
- The Deputy
- Diagnosis: Unknown *
- The DuPont Show with June Allyson
- Hennesey
- Hotel de Paree
- Johnny Ringo
- The Kate Smith Show *
- The Lineup
- Lucy in Connecticut
- The Many Loves of Dobie Gillis
- Men into Space
- Mr. Lucky
- New Comedy Showcase *
- The Revlon Revue *
- The Robert Herridge Theatre
- Tightrope!
- The Twilight Zone

Not returning from 1958–59:

- The $64,000 Question
- Armstrong by Request
- The Arthur Godfrey Show
- December Bride
- Lux Playhouse
- Name That Tune
- The Phil Silvers Show
- Pursuit
- Schlitz Playhouse
- Stars in Action
- That's My Boy
- Trackdown
- Westinghouse Desilu Playhouse
- Westinghouse Lucille Ball-Desi Arnaz Show
- Yancy Derringer
- Your Hit Parade

=== NBC ===
Returning Series

- 21 Beacon Street
- Alcoa Theatre
- The Art Carney Special
- The Arthur Murray Party
- Bachelor Father (moved from CBS)
- Bat Masterson
- The Bell Telephone Hour
- The Dinah Shore Chevy Show
- The Ford Show
- Gillette Cavalcade of Sports
- Goodyear Television Playhouse
- The Huntley–Brinkley Report
- It Could Be You
- The Lawless Years
- The Loretta Young Show
- M Squad
- Masquerade Party
- NBC News Specials
- Omnibus
- People Are Funny
- The Perry Como Show
- Peter Gunn
- Phillies Jackpot Bowling
- The Price Is Right
- Richard Diamond, Private Detective (moved from CBS)
- Startime
- The Steve Allen Plymouth Show
- Tales of Wells Fargo
- This Is Your Life
- Wagon Train
- You Bet Your Life

New Series

- Bonanza
- The Chevy Mystery Show
- The Deputy
- Fibber McGee and Molly
- Five Fingers
- Gas Company Playhouse
- Happy
- Johnny Staccato
- Laramie
- Law of the Plainsman
- Love and Marriage
- The Man and the Challenge
- Man from Interpol *
- Moment of Fear *
- Music on Ice *
- NBC Playhouse *
- NBC Sunday Showcase
- Overland Trail *
- Startime
- The Steve Allen Plymouth Show
- Tate
- The Troubleshooters
- Wichita Town
- World Wide '60 *
- Wrangler *

Not returning from 1958–59:

- The Adventures of Ellery Queen
- Behind Closed Doors
- Brains & Brawn
- Chet Huntley Reporting
- Cimarron City
- The D.A.'s Man
- The David Niven Show
- The Ed Wynn Show
- Fight Beat
- The George Burns Show
- Jefferson Drum
- The Music Shop
- Northwest Passage
- Pete Kelly's Blues
- Steve Canyon
- The Thin Man

=== NTA ===
Not returning from 1958–59:

- How to Marry a Millionaire
- Man Without a Gun
- Premiere Performance
- This is Alice

Note: The * indicates that the program was introduced in midseason.
