= 1958 in American television =

This is a list of American television-related events in 1958.

== Events ==
Date	Event	Ref.
August 15	Dotto, a pioneer in big-money quiz shows, becomes the first game show to be cancelled due to the probe in the quiz show scandals. This was due to a federal investigation that started with the allegation that a contestant of that program has been given answers in advance of the show's taping. Several other quiz shows were later canceled due to the investigation.	
October 17	Fred Astaire makes his television starring debut in An Evening with Fred Astaire, an NBC special that later won nine Emmy Awards, and is one of the first television specials to be preserved by means of videotape.	
September 16	Orson Welles's The Fountain of Youth is broadcast on NBC-TV's Colgate Theatre. Filmed in 1956 for a proposed Desilu series, the half-hour program airs only once and becomes the only unsold pilot ever to win a Peabody Award.	

=== Other television-related events in 1958 ===
- Ampex demonstrates their design for a color video tape recorder.

== Television programs ==
=== Debuts ===
Date	Debut	Network
January 4	Sea Hunt	Broadcast syndication
January 7	Mickey Spillane's Mike Hammer	Broadcast syndication
January 12	Shirley Temple's Storybook	NBC
January 18	Young People's Concerts	CBS
February 10	J. P. Patches	KIRO-TV
February 10	Walt Disney Presents: Annette	ABC
February 15	The Dick Clark Show	ABC
March	Target	Broadcast syndication
April 25	Jefferson Drum	NBC
May 8	Jazz Party	Dumont
July 3	Buckskin	NBC
July 6	Decision	NBC
July 7	Frontier Justice	CBS
August 19	Colgate Theatre	NBC
August 25	Concentration	NBC
September 6	The Adventures of Spunky and Tadpole	Broadcast syndication
September 6	Wanted Dead or Alive	CBS
September 14	Northwest Passage	NBC
September 22	Peter Gunn	NBC
September 23	Bronco	ABC
September 23	Rescue 8	Broadcast syndication
September 24	The Donna Reed Show	ABC
September 26	Frontier Doctor	Broadcast syndication
September 27	Cimarron City	NBC
September 29	The Huckleberry Hound Show	Broadcast syndication
September 29	The Texan	CBS
September 30	Naked City	ABC
September 30	The Rifleman	ABC
October	This Is Alice	NTA Film Network
October 1	Mackenzie's Raiders	Broadcast syndication
October 2	Behind Closed Doors	NBC
October 2	Felix the Cat	Broadcast syndication
October 2	Pixie and Dixie and Mr. Jinks	Broadcast syndication
October 2	The Rough Riders	ABC
October 2	Yancy Derringer	CBS
October 3	Lux Playhouse	NBC
October 5	Lawman	ABC
October 6	The Ann Sothern Show	CBS
October 6	Cannonball	Broadcast syndication
October 6	Westinghouse Desilu Playhouse	CBS
October 8	Bat Masterson	NBC
October 8	Kraft Music Hall	NBC
October 10	77 Sunset Strip	ABC
October 10	Man with a Camera	ABC
October 21	The George Burns Show	NBC
October 22	Pursuit	CBS
November 4	Flight	Broadcast syndication

=== Ending this year ===
Date	Show	Network	Debut	Notes
January 1	Arthur Godfrey's Talent Scouts	CBS	December 6, 1948	
January 3	Strike It Rich	CBS	May 7, 1951	
January 29	Date with the Angels	ABC	May 10, 1957	
March 7	Walt Disney Presents: Annette	CBS	February 10, 1958	
March 25	The Eve Arden Show	CBS	September 17, 1957	
April 1	Shower of Stars	CBS	September 30, 1954	
April 1	Telephone Time	ABC	April 8, 1956	
April 11	The Court of Last Resort	NBC	October 4, 1957	
April 14	Love That Jill	ABC	January 20, 1958	
April 28	Adventures of Superman	Syndication	September 19, 1952	
May 5	Casey Jones	Syndication	October 8, 1957	
May 22	Fireside Theatre	NBC	April 5, 1949	
May 23	The Life of Riley	NBC	October 4, 1949	
May 29	Boots and Saddles	Syndication	September 19, 1957	
June 14	The Elgin Hour	ABC	October 5, 1954	
June 24	Broken Arrow	CBS	September 25, 1956	
June 26	Climax!	CBS	October 7, 1954	
June 27	NBC Matinee Theater	NBC	October 31, 1955	
June 27	The Frank Sinatra Show	ABC	October 18, 1957	
July 2	Harbor Command	Syndication	October 11, 1957	
July 7	Decoy	Syndication	October 14, 1957	
July 7	See It Now	CBS	November 18, 1951	
July 8	Mr. Adams and Eve	CBS	January 4, 1957	
July 9	The Gray Ghost	Syndication	October 10, 1957	
July 21	Suspicion	NBC	September 30, 1957	
August 15	Dotto	CBS (daytime); NBC (primetime)	January 6, 1958	These programs were among several that were implicated in the quiz show scandals.
August 29	The Adventures of Jim Bowie	ABC	September 7, 1956	These programs were among several that were implicated in the quiz show scandals.
September 7	The $64,000 Challenge	CBS	April 8, 1956	
September 15	The George Burns and Gracie Allen Show	CBS	October 12, 1950	
September 24	The Adventures of Wild Bill Hickok	ABC	April 15, 1951 (on Syndication)	
September 25	Sergeant Preston of the Yukon	CBS	September 29, 1955	
September 28	Decision	NBC	July 6, 1958	
September 29	Studio One	CBS	November 7, 1948	
October 7	Kraft Television Theatre	NBC	May 7, 1947	
October 7	Colgate Theatre	NBC	August 19, 1958	
October 16	Twenty-One	NBC	1956	These programs were among several that were implicated in the quiz show scandals.
November 2	The $64,000 Question	CBS	June 7, 1955	These programs were among several that were implicated in the quiz show scandals.
December 11	Jefferson Drum	NBC	April 25, 1958	
December 25	Jazz Party	WNTA-TV	May 8, 1958	
Unknown date	Studio 57	Syndication	September 21, 1954 (on DuMont)	
Unknown date	The Big Story	Syndication	September 16, 1949 (on NBC)	
Unknown date	The New Adventures of Charlie Chan	Syndication	June 1957	

== Networks and services ==
=== Network launches ===
Network	Type	Launch date	Notes	Source
Badger Television Network	Over-the-air regional	January	A three-station regional television network involving three ABC affiliated stations in Wisconsin, including in Milwaukee, Madison, and Green Bay, with Milwaukee's WISN-TV serving as the network's flagship.	

=== Network closures ===
Network	Type	End date	Notes	Source
Badger Television Network	Over-the-air regional	August 8	It ceased operations due to financial issues.	

== Television stations ==
=== Station launches ===
Date	Market	Station	Channel	Affiliation	Notes/References
January 1	Helena, Montana	KXLJ-TV	12	NBC	
January 1	Peoria, Illinois	WMBD-TV	31	CBS	
January 6	San Juan, Puerto Rico	WIPR-TV	6	NET	
January 20	Salt Lake City, Utah	KUED	7	NET	
January 21	Rapid City, South Dakota	KRSD-TV	3	NBC	
January 23	Minot, North Dakota	KMOT-TV	10	NBC (primary); ABC (secondary)	semi-satellite of KFYR-TV Bismarck
February 1	Orlando, Florida	WLOF-TV	9	ABC	
February 2	San Juan, Puerto Rico	WSTE-TV	7	Independent	
February 8	Seattle, Washington	KIRO-TV	7	CBS	
February 17	Atlanta, Georgia	WETV	30	NET	
March 3	Oakland/San Francisco, California	KTVU	2	Independent	
March 5	Scottsbluff, Nebraska	KDUH-TV	4	ABC	
March 15	Billings, Montana	KGHL-TV	8	NBC (primary); ABC (secondary)	
April 1	Eureka, California	KVIQ-TV	6	NBC	
May 1	Albuquerque, New Mexico	KNME-TV	5	NET	
September 2	Salina, Kansas	KAYS-TV	7	CBS (primary); ABC (secondary)	Semi-satellite of KTVH (now KWCH-DT) in Hutchinson
September 5	Louisville, Kentucky	WFPK	15	NET	Now KET/PBS affiliate WKPC-TV
September 10	Jacksonville, Florida	WJCT	7	NET	
September 14	Pittsburgh, Pennsylvania	WTAE-TV	4	ABC	
September 20	Nacogdoches, Texas	KTES	19	Independent	
October 5	Great Falls, Montana	KRTV	3	NBC	
October 8	Alexandria, Minnesota	KCMT	7	NBC (primary); ABC (secondary)	Former satellite of WCCO-TV/Minneapolis, Minnesota, closed in 2018.
October 12	Flint, Michigan	WJRT-TV	12	ABC	
October 17	Tampa, Florida	WEDU	3	NET	
October 20	Kalispell, Montana	KULR	9	Independent	
October 27	Tampa, Florida	WEDU	3	NET	
November 5	Garden City, Kansas	KGLD	11	NBC	Satellite of KCKT/Hays
November 9	Nampa, Idaho (Boise, Idaho)	KCIX-TV	6	Independent	
November 10	Gainesville, Florida	WUFT	5	NET	
November 17	Wailuku, Hawaii	KAII-TV	7	NBC	Satellite of KONA-TV (now KHON-TV) in Honolulu
November 27	Aberdeen, South Dakota	KXAB-TV	9	NBC (primary); ABC (secondary)	
November 30	Buffalo, New York	WKBW-TV	7	ABC	
December 1	Odessa, Texas	KVKM-TV	9	ABC	
December 5	Toledo, Ohio	WTOL	11	CBS (primary); NBC (secondary)	
December 15	North Platte, Nebraska	KNOP-TV	2	NBC	

=== Network affiliation changes ===
Date	Market	Station	Channel	Old affiliation	New affiliation	References
November 16	Hartford, Connecticut	WTIC-TV (original)	3	Independent	CBS	
Unknown date	Lexington, Kentucky	WKXP-TV	27	Independent	CBS	

=== Station closures ===
Date	City of license/Market	Station	Channel	Affiliation	First air date	Notes/Ref.
April 7	Kalispell, Montana	KGEZ-TV	9	Independent	July 9, 1957	
May 7	Honolulu, Hawaii	KHVH-TV	13	Independent	May 5, 1957	Merged with KULA-TV (now KITV)
May 11	Fort Lauderdale, Florida	WITV	17	ABC	November 25, 1953	
May 31	York, Pennsylvania (Harrisburg/Lebanon)	WNOW-TV	49	NTA Film Network	November 9, 1953	
June 5	Bloomington, Illinois	WBLN	15		December 1, 1953	
June 20	Fayetteville/Raleigh, North Carolina	WFLB-TV	18	ABC (primary); CBS/NBC (secondary)		
June 21	San Francisco	KSAN-TV	32	Independent	March 9, 1954	
July 16	Honolulu, Hawaii	KHVH-TV	13	Independent	May 5, 1957	
September 10	Wilkes-Barre/Scranton, Pennsylvania	WILK-TV	34	ABC (primary); NTA Film Network (secondary)	September 7, 1953	Merged with current ABC affiliate WNEP-TV in Scranton.
September 13	Wilmington, Delaware	WVUE	12	Independent	March 23, 1949	
September 30	Buffalo, New York	WBUF	17	NBC	August 17, 1953	Returned to the air in 1959 as NET member station WNED-TV

== See also ==
- 1958 in television
- 1958 in film
- 1958 in the United States
- List of American films of 1958
