= Top-rated United States television programs of 1958–59 =

This table displays the top-rated primetime television series of the 1958–59 season as measured by Nielsen Media Research.

Rank	Program	Network	Rating
1	Gunsmoke	CBS	39.6
2	Wagon Train	NBC	36.1
3	Have Gun – Will Travel	CBS	34.3
4	The Rifleman	ABC	33.1
5	The Danny Thomas Show	CBS	32.8
6	Maverick	ABC	30.4
7	Tales of Wells Fargo	NBC	30.2
8	The Real McCoys	ABC	30.1
9	I've Got a Secret	CBS	29.8
10	The Life and Legend of Wyatt Earp	ABC	29.1
11	The Price Is Right	NBC	28.6
12	The Red Skelton Show	CBS	28.5
13	Zane Grey Theater	CBS	28.3
13	Father Knows Best	CBS	28.3
15	The Texan	CBS	28.2
16	Wanted: Dead or Alive	CBS	28.0
16	Peter Gunn	NBC	28.0
18	Cheyenne	ABC	27.9
19	Perry Mason	CBS	27.5
20	The Ford Show	NBC	27.2
21	Sugarfoot	ABC	27.0
21	The Ann Sothern Show	CBS	27.0
21	The Perry Como Show	NBC	27.0
24	Alfred Hitchcock Presents	CBS	26.8
25	Name That Tune	CBS	26.7
25	General Electric Theater	CBS	26.7
27	The Lawman	ABC	26.0
28	Rawhide	CBS	25.9
29	This Is Your Life	NBC	25.8
30	The Millionaire	CBS	25.6
