= The Music Shop =

Music Shop or The Music Shop may refer to:

- Music store, retail business that sells musical instruments and related accessories
- Music Shop, a/k/a ABC Music Shop, 1955 British musical programme on ITV with Arthur Murphy
- The Music Shop (TV program), 1959 American music program on NBC
- Music Shop (TV program), 1972–84 West German music program on Radio Bremen; original title Musikladen
- The Music Shop (TV series), 1996–98 Australian children's series on Network Ten
- The Music Shop, 2017 novel by English author Rachel Joyce
- Johnny Mercer's Music Shop, a 1943 American radio program
- Music Shop Murthy, a 2024 Indian film by Siva Paladugu
