= The Arthur Murray Party =

American TV variety series (1950–1960)

- Photo from the program, 1953. Kathryn Murray is at center.
- Genre: Variety show
- Directed by: Barry Shear; Burt Shevelove
- Presented by: Arthur Murray; Kathryn Murray
- Country of origin: United States
- Original language: English

Production
- Executive producer: Jack Philbin
- Camera setup: Multi-camera
- Running time: 15 min/30 min/60 min

Original release
- Network: ABC; DuMont; CBS; NBC
- Release: July 20, 1950 – September 6, 1960

The Arthur Murray Party is an American television variety show that ran from July 1950 until September 1960. The show was hosted by dancers Arthur and Kathryn Murray, the show featured various acts and celebrity guests and acted as advertisement for their chain of dance studios. Each week, the couple performed a mystery dance, and the viewer who correctly identified the dance would receive two free lessons at a local studio.

The Arthur Murray Party is notable for being one of the few TV series broadcast on all four major commercial networks in the 1950s during the Golden Age of Television.

== Overview ==
The show was set up like a large party, with Kathryn hosting a variety of guests, from sports stars to actors or musicians. Murray dance studio instructors would help Kathryn and Arthur to show their guests how to perform a particular dance step. At the end of the show, the couple would perform a Johann Strauss waltz.

The dancers often dressed in elegant clothing, which could cause amusing problems at times. In one surviving episode (February 15, 1954), available on Internet Archive, the well-dressed female dancers are heard squealing with teenage-like excitement at guest star Johnnie Ray. Buddy Holly and The Crickets performed "Peggy Sue" on the December 29, 1957 telecast, also preserved on a kinescope.

The J. Fred and Leslie W. MacDonald Collection at the Library of Congress contains thirteen kinescoped programs and partial programs of the various incarnations of Arthur Murray on TV. These include a complete one-hour show from late 1950 featuring guests The DeMarco Sisters plus Andy and Della Russell; a complete half-hour show from August 17, 1954, featuring guest Don Cornell; a segment from September 27, 1956, in which The Platters perform "You'll Never Know" and Andy Williams sings "Canadian Sunset"; and a segment from August 5, 1957, in which celebrities Jack E. Leonard, Bert Lahr, Paul Winchell, and June Havoc compete in a dance contest.

Choreographer James Starbuck won an Emmy Award for his work on this program.

== Broadcast history ==
The show appeared on ABC for the first few months of its broadcast as Arthur Murray Party Time, then moved to the DuMont, ABC, CBS, DuMont, CBS, NBC, CBS, and finally NBC (in that order).

The time slots were as follows:

- July 1950 – September 1950 Thursdays 9 – 9:30 p.m. Eastern Time (ABC)
- October 1950 – January 1951 Sundays 9 – 10 p.m. E.T. (DuMont)
- January 1951 – March 1951 Sundays 9 – 9:30 p.m. E. T. (DuMont)
- April 1951 – June 1951 Mondays 9 – 9:30 p.m. E. T. (ABC)
- September 1951 - December 1951 Wednesdays 9 – 9:30 p.m. E. T. (ABC)
- January 1952 - May 1952 Sundays 9 – 9:30 p.m. E. T. (ABC)
- July 1952 - August 1952 Fridays 8 – 8:30 p.m. E. T. (CBS)
- October 1952 - April 1953 Sundays 10 – 10:30 p.m. E. T. (DuMont)
- June 1953 - October 1953 Sundays 9:30 – 10 p.m. E. T. (CBS)
- October 1953 - April 1954 Mondays 7:30 – 7:45 p.m. E. T. (NBC)
- June 1954 - September 1954 Tuesdays 8:30 – 9 p.m. E. T. (NBC)
- June 1955 - September 1955 Tuesdays 8:30 – 9 p.m. E. T. (NBC)
- April 1956 - September 1956 Thursdays 10 – 10:30 p.m. E. T. (CBS)
- April 1957 - June 1957 Tuesdays 8 – 8:30 p.m. E. T. (NBC)
- July 1957 - September 1957 Mondays 9:30 – 10 p.m. E. T. (NBC)
- September 1958 - September 1959 Mondays 10 – 10:30 p.m. E. T. (NBC)
- September 1959 - January 1960 Tuesdays 9 – 9:30 p.m. E. T. (NBC)
- January 1960 - September 1960 Tuesdays 9:30 – 10 p.m. E. T. (NBC)

When the series first moved to DuMont in the fall of 1950, its title was changed to The Arthur Murray Show. It became The Arthur Murray Party by fall of 1951, and continued with that title thereafter.

== See also ==
- List of programs broadcast by the DuMont Television Network
- List of surviving DuMont Television Network broadcasts
- 1950-51 United States network television schedule (ABC/DuMont, see "Broadcast History" section, 30 minutes and 60 minutes)
- 1951-52 United States network television schedule (ABC, Wednesdays at 9:15pm ET, 15 minutes)
- 1952-53 United States network television schedule (DuMont, Sundays at 10pm ET, 30 minutes)
- 1953-54 United States network television schedule (NBC, Mondays at 7:30pm ET, 15 minutes)
- 1954-55 United States network television schedule
- 1955-56 United States network television schedule
- 1956-57 United States network television schedule
- 1957-58 United States network television schedule
- 1958-59 United States network television schedule (NBC, Mondays at 10pm ET, 30 minutes)
- 1959-60 United States network television schedule (NBC, Tuesdays at 9pm ET, 30 minutes)

Note: The Arthur Murray Party aired outside of prime time in certain TV seasons.

== Bibliography ==
- David Weinstein, The Forgotten Network: DuMont and the Birth of American Television (Philadelphia: Temple University Press, 2004) ISBN 1-59213-245-6
