= Keep Talking (game show) =

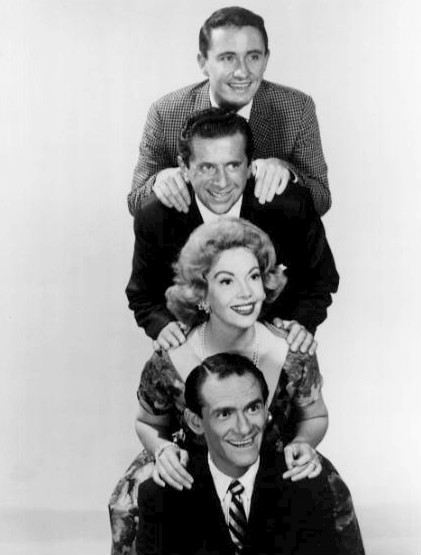
- From top: Host Merv Griffin and panelists Morey Amsterdam, Jayne Meadows and Danny Dayton.
- Genre: Panel/Game show
- Created by: Herb Wolf
- Written by: Herb Wolf
- Directed by: Lloyd Gross
- Presented by: Monty Hall; Carl Reiner; Merv Griffin
- Country of origin: United States
- No. of seasons: 2

Production
- Producer: Wolf Productions
- Production locations: Studio 51 (CBS); ABC Studios
- Running time: 30 minutes

Original release
- Network: CBS; ABC
- Release: July 15, 1958 – May 3, 1960

Keep Talking is an American game show broadcast on CBS and ABC from the summer of 1958 to the spring of 1960. The show was first hosted by Monty Hall, then by Carl Reiner, and then Merv Griffin.

== Production ==
The show was a hosted panelist/game show produced by Wolf Productions and broadcast in the United States the summer of 1958, and in both the 1958-59 and the 1959-60 primetime television seasons, though on different days, times, and networks each season.

CBS broadcast the show on three different days in various timeslots:

- 8:30-9 PM (EST) on Tuesdays from July 15, 1958 through October 1958, (moving to 8 PM in September) with Monty Hall as host
- 10–10:30 PM (EST) on Sundays (November 1958 through February 1959) with Carl Reiner as host
- 8–8:30 PM (EST) on Wednesdays (February 1959 through September 1959) with Carl Reiner as host

During this CBS run, other celebrities, such as Vincent Price, filled in as host when needed. These shows were filmed at CBS' Studio 51 in New York City.

The show moved to ABC for the 1959-60 season, filmed in the ABC Studios in California with Merv Griffin as host — the show was broadcast back on Tuesday again, but at a later time, 10:30-11 pm (EST). The last show was broadcast May 3, 1960.

== Format ==
Six celebrity panelists, divided into two teams, would try to guess a secret word given to one player on each team. These two players would then proceed to tell a story to their team involving that word, yet not using that word. Narration of the story would jump from team-mate to team-mate, often leaving the new narrator at a loss as to how to continue the story. Little attention was paid to scoring and points—the point was for the panelists to build their ad-lib story seamlessly and entertainingly.

== Stars ==
Among the panelists who appeared during the run of the show were:

- Morey Amsterdam
- Paul Winchell
- Peggy Cass
- Pat Carroll
- Orson Bean
- Joey Bishop
- Danny Dayton
- Ilka Chase (CBS run only)
- Elaine May (CBS run only)
- Jayne Meadows
