= The Loretta Young Show =

American anthology drama series (1953–1961)

- The Loretta Young Show video cover
- Also known as: Letter to Loretta
- Genre: Anthology/Drama
- Directed by: Laslo Benedek, Richard Carlson, Richard Donner, Robert Florey, Norman Foster, Rudolph Maté, Richard Morris, John Newland, Tay Garnett, Jeffrey Hayden, Don Weis
- Presented by: Loretta Young
- Theme music composer: Harry Lubin
- Opening theme: "Loretta"
- Composer: Harry Lubin
- Country of origin: United States
- Original language: English
- No. of seasons: 8
- No. of episodes: 165

Production
- Camera setup: Single-camera
- Running time: 30 minutes (including commercials)
- Production companies: Lewislor Films (1953–58); Toreto Enterprises (1958–61)

Original release
- Network: NBC
- Release: September 2, 1953 – June 4, 1961

The Loretta Young Show (originally known as Letter to Loretta) is an American anthology drama television series broadcast on Sunday nights from September 2, 1953, to June 4, 1961, on NBC for a total of 165 episodes. The series was hosted by actress Loretta Young, who also played the lead in various episodes.

== Series overview ==
The Loretta Young Show was sponsored by Procter & Gamble for its first six seasons, from 1953 to 1959. After a dispute with her sponsor, Young found other sponsors to sustain her program: The Toni Company (1959–1961), Philip Morris (1959–60), and Warner-Lambert's Listerine (1960–61).

The program began with the premise that each drama was an answer to a question asked in her fan mail; the program's original title was Letter to Loretta. The title was changed to The Loretta Young Show during the first season (as of February 14, 1954), and the "letter" concept was dropped altogether at the end of the second season. At this time, Young's health, which had deteriorated due to a heavy production schedule during the second season, required a number of guest hosts and guest stars; her first appearance in the 1955–56 season was for the Christmas show.

From this point on, Young appeared in only about half of each season's shows as an actress and merely functioned as the program hostess for the remainder. She became known for swirling around in her gowns during her entrance through a door at the start of the show, a convention parodied by many comedians, including Ernie Kovacs.

Young was quoted as saying

After the audience had seen me well-groomed, I can wear horrible clothes, ugly make-up, or even a false nose during the show without anyone wondering whether I've aged overnight or something.

This program, minus Young's introductions and summarized conclusions (Young insisted on their deletion due to her concern that the dresses she wore in those segments would "date" the program), was rerun in daytime by NBC as The Loretta Young Theatre from October 1960 to December 1964, and then appeared, again without the introductions and conclusions, in syndication through the 1970s. In 1992, selected episodes of the original series (with Young's opening and closing segments intact), authorized by Young herself and chosen from her personal collection of 16 mm film prints, were released on home video, and eventually shown on cable television.

During the series' eight-year run, the series was popular with audiences and critics, and it finished in 28th place in the Nielsen ratings in the spring of 1955. It finished its last season far behind its competition, Candid Camera on CBS, and was thereby cancelled. In 1954, Billboard voted it the third-best network filmed drama series.

== Selected guest stars ==
- Julie Adams
- John Agar
- Claude Akins
- Rico Alaniz
- Anna Maria Alberghetti
- Eddie Albert
- Eleanor Audley
- Jean-Pierre Aumont
- Frances Bavier
- Gene Barry
- Hugh Beaumont
- Barbara Billingsley
- Charles Bronson
- Argentina Brunetti
- Ellen Burstyn
- Richard Carlson
- Mae Clark
- Mike Connors
- Chuck Connors
- Jackie Coogan
- Johnny Crawford
- Hume Cronyn
- Pat Crowley
- Jane Darwell
- Laraine Day
- Elinor Donahue
- Bobby Driscoll
- Joanne Dru
- James Drury
- Irene Dunne
- Shelley Fabares
- Steve Forrest
- Nina Foch
- William Frawley
- Kathleen Freeman
- Alan Hale Jr.
- Barbara Hale
- Darryl Hickman
- Dwayne Hickman
- Dennis Hopper
- Clegg Hoyt
- Dean Jagger
- Vivi Janiss
- Van Johnson
- Phyllis Kirk
- Tommy Kirk
- Cloris Leachman
- Anna Lee
- Viveca Lindfors
- Jack Lord
- Marjorie Lord
- Anita Louise
- Frank Lovejoy
- Sue Lyon
- George Macready
- Dorothy Malone
- Virginia Mayo
- Mercedes McCambridge
- Ethel Merman
- Gary Merrill
- Roger Mobley
- Ricardo Montalbán
- Elizabeth Montgomery
- Bill Mumy
- Burt Mustin
- Alan Napier
- Maidie Norman
- Hugh O'Brian
- Merle Oberon
- Edward Platt
- Marion Ross
- Rosalind Russell
- Natalie Schafer
- William Schallert
- Max Showalter
- Lois Smith
- Barbara Stanwyck
- Jan Sterling
- Robert Sterling
- Hope Summers
- Phyllis Thaxter
- Marshall Thompson
- Mary Treen
- Teresa Wright

== Ratings and time slots ==
Season	Year	Time slot	Rank	Rating
1	1953–1954	Sunday, 10:00pm	Not in the Top 30	
2	1954–1955	Sunday, 10:00pm	#28	27.7
3	1955–1956	Sunday, 10:00pm	Not in the Top 30	
4	1956–1957	Sunday, 10:00pm	Not in the Top 30	
5	1957–1958	Sunday, 10:00pm	#30	26.6
6	1958–1959	Sunday, 10:00pm	Not in the Top 30	
7	1959–1960	Sunday, 10:00pm	Not in the Top 30	
8	1960–1961	Sunday, 10:00pm	Not in the Top 30	

== Accolades ==
In 1959, the series won a Golden Globe Award for Best TV Show. Loretta Young earned three Best Actress Primetime Emmy Awards in 1955, 1957 and 1959. Norbert Brodine claimed an Emmy for Best Cinematography in 1957. Young also earned Emmy nominations in 1954, 1956, 1958, 1960 and 1961, while Brodine was nominated in 1955, 1956 and 1958 as well. Other Emmy nominations were for Best New Program in 1954, Best Dramatic Series – Less Than One Hour in 1959, Best Direction for Robert Florey in 1955, Best Teleplay Writing – Half Hour or Less for Richard Morris in 1957 and Best Art Direction in a Television Film for Frank Paul Sylos in 1959.

The Directors Guild of America nominated Robert Florey in 1955 and Norman Foster in 1957 for their work on the series.

== Reboot ==
The New Loretta Young Show ran for one season on CBS from September 24, 1962, to March 18, 1963, under the alternating sponsorship of Lever Brothers and The Toni Company. The show was an episodic comedy/drama, with Young playing the role of Christine Massey, a widow raising seven children in suburban Connecticut. Her romantic interest was Paul Belzer; the two characters were married in the 26th and final episode. Running against the popular series Ben Casey, the New Loretta Young Show received poor ratings and was not renewed for a second season.

Young introduced and closed each episode as herself, as she had done with The Loretta Young Show. Episodes of The New Loretta Young Show are sometimes included in certain syndicated packages of The Loretta Young Show, with the new series title removed and the original Loretta Young Show theme and titles added.

Lyl Productions (Young's company) had a contract dispute and court case with Portland Mason. Aged 13, she was cast as Marnie, then dismissed before the pilot episode was shot. Upset by producers rejecting her wardrobe, which she was contractually required to supply, her mother sent her home to eat lunch and recompose herself. Meanwhile, Lyl decided if she was not back by that afternoon, Celia Kaye would play Marnie. Nobody told the Masons and Portland returned late. After Kaye replaced her, the Masons and Lyl sued each other for breach of contract; the court ruled in favor of the former.

=== Cast ===
- Loretta Young as Christine Massey
- James Philbrook as Paul Belzer
- Dack Rambo as Peter Massey
- Dirk Rambo as Paul Massey
- Cindy Carol as Binkie Massey
- Sandy Descher as Judy Massey
- Tracy Stratford as Maria Massey
- Beverly Washburn as Vickie Massey
- Celia Kaye as Marnie Massey

Awards
Preceded by no award	Emmy Award for Outstanding Lead Actress - Drama Series; 1955, 1957, 1959	Succeeded by no award
Preceded by unknown	Golden Globe Award for Best TV Show; 1959	Succeeded by unknown
