= Buddy Bregman =

American conductor (1930–2017)

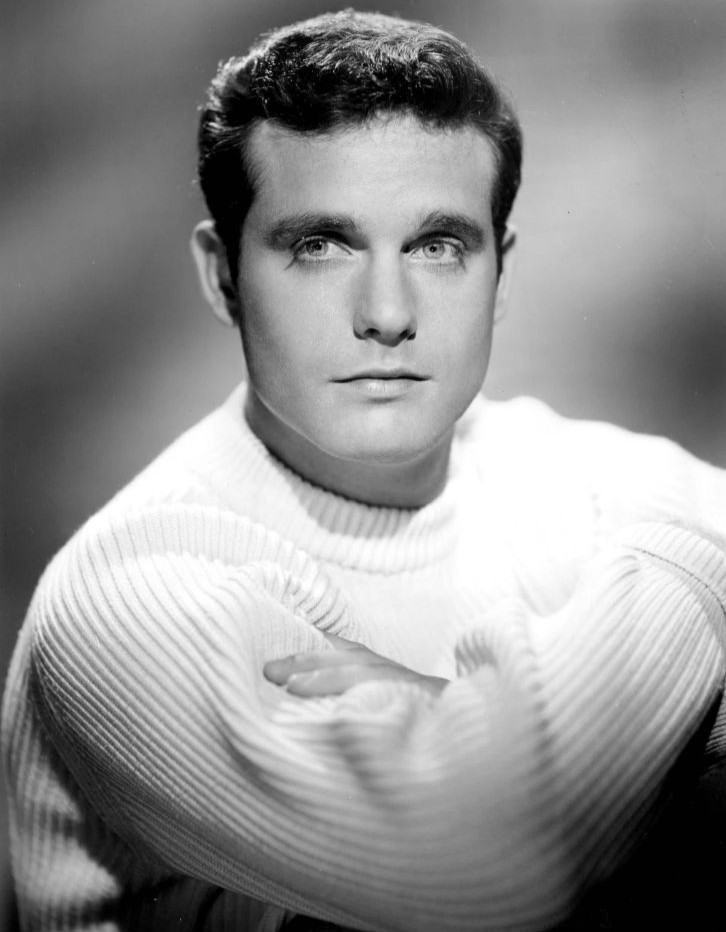
- Bregman in 1959

Background information
- Born: Louis Isidore Bregman; July 9, 1930; Chicago, Illinois, U.S.
- Died: January 8, 2017 (aged 86) Los Angeles, California
- Genres: Pop, jazz
- Occupations: Composer, arranger, producer, conductor
- Label: Verve
- Formerly of: Ella Fitzgerald, Eddie Fisher

Louis Isidore "Buddy" Bregman (July 9, 1930 – January 8, 2017) was an American arranger and conductor.

== Biography ==
Bregman was born in Chicago. His father was an executive in the steel industry. His uncle was songwriter Jule Styne. He spent summers in Hollywood with Styne, observing him compose music. Bregman wrote his first arrangement when he was eleven years old.

After two years at the University of California in Los Angeles, he left to pursue a career in music. He wrote an arrangement for the song "Bazoom I Need Your Lovin'" (1954) by The Cheers, written by Jerry Leiber and Mike Stoller. In 1955 he was appointed orchestra leader for the Gary Crosby Show on CBS radio.

At the age of 25 Bregman became head of artists and repertoire (A&R) at Verve Records, founded and run by Norman Granz, after meeting with Granz at the home of Rosemary Clooney and José Ferrer. He arranged and conducted Verve's first single ("I'm With You"/"The Rock and Roll Waltz") and first album, Anita, both featuring vocals by Anita O'Day. In 1956 Bregman arranged and conducted three albums which were certified platinum by the RIAA. The first two recordings in Ella Fitzgerald's Songbooks were arranged by Bregman: the Cole Porter and Rodgers & Hart entries. He also arranged several of Fitzgerald's early Verve singles. Learning that Bing Crosby was out of his exclusive contract at Decca, in 1956 Bregman conceived, arranged and conducted Bing Sings Whilst Bregman Swings, which was certified platinum. During the same year, he was arranger and conductor for The Greatest!! Count Basie Plays, Joe Williams Sings Standards. Bregman arranged and conducted on albums for Toni Harper, Jane Powell, Ricky Nelson, and for his friend Fred Astaire, including several of Astaire's own songs.

Bregman arranged and conducted tracks such as "Let There Be Love" (Trend) for Bobby Short, "Rock-A-Bye Your Baby With A Dixie Melody" (Decca) for Jerry Lewis, and "The Wayward Wind" (Era) for Gogi Grant.

In addition, he produced a selection of his own instrumental albums, such as The Gershwin Anniversary Album, Funny Face & Other Gershwin Tunes, Swinging Kicks, Swingin' Standards, Dig Buddy in Hi-Fi, Symphony of the Golden West, Anita O'Day – Rules of the Road, and That Swing. After leaving Verve, he became music arranger and conductor for The Eddie Fisher Show, then his own show, The Music Shop (also known as the Buddy Bregman Music Show).

He was involved in creating the scores or orchestrations for several motion pictures in this period: Five Guns West (1955), Crime in the Streets and The Wild Party (both 1956), The Pajama Game (1957), including scoring all of the Bob Fosse dance numbers, The Delicate Delinquent, Born Reckless (1958), Secret of the Purple Reef (1960), and The Cat Burglar (1961).

In the early 1960s Bregman became a television producer and director. After producing several TV specials in Europe, he was hired by David Attenborough for BBC 2 in 1964. In 1966, he was appointed head of light entertainment for the weekday ITV company Rediffusion London.

Bregman wrote Jump Jim Crow – a musical for the Royal Shakespeare Company – and moved into London-based independent TV and film production. He produced and directed The New-Fangled Wandering Minstrel Show, a TV special starring Olivia Newton-John and Georgie Fame.

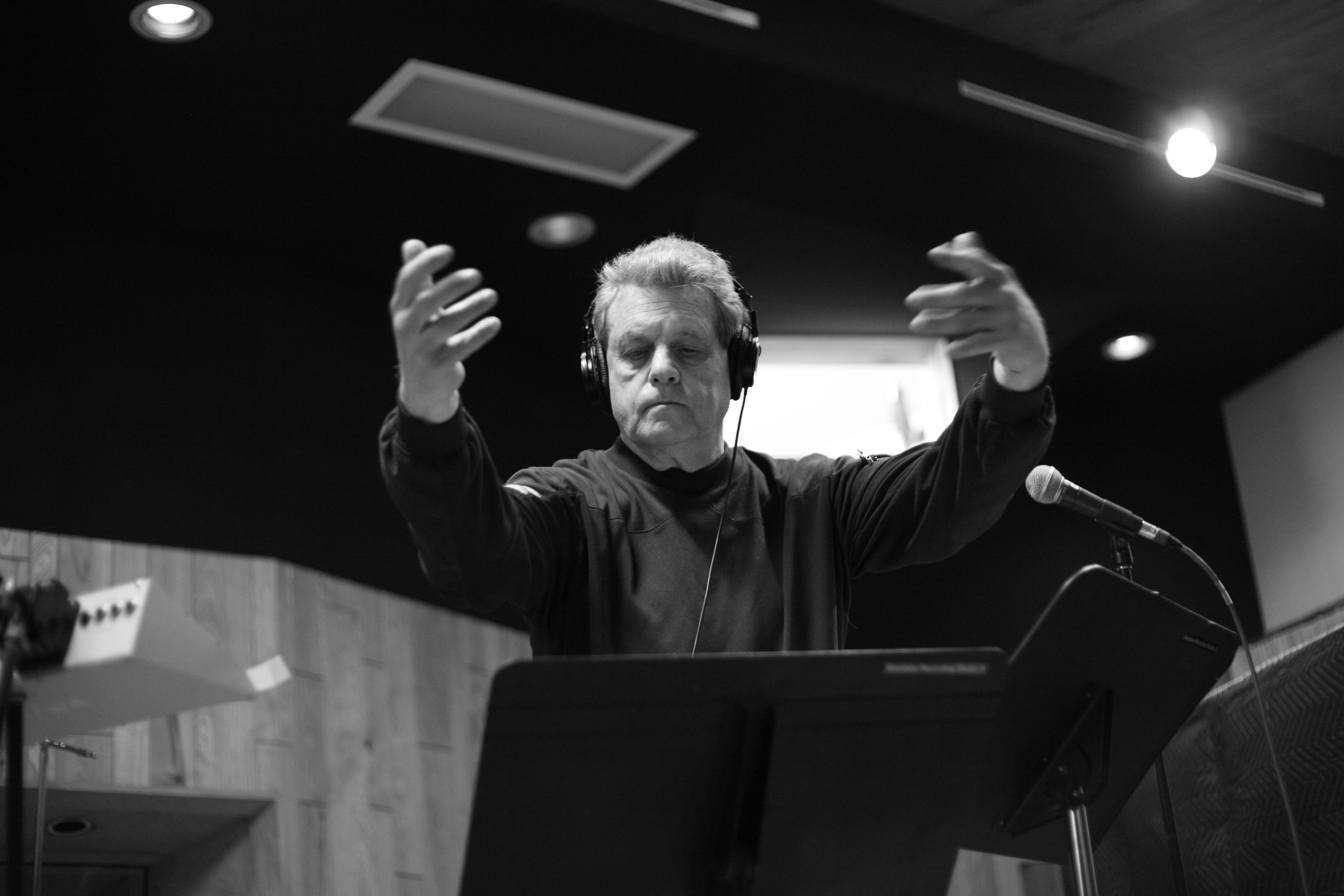
Bregman conducts his final album sessions at Studio D, Westlake Recording Studios, May 2006

After returning to the United States, Bregman worked as a producer and director on television programs.

In late 2004, Bregman was tasked with arranging and conducting a 16-track vocal album of old and newer pop/jazz standards. It features an 18-piece big band of West Coast sidemen Hubert Laws, Ricky Woodard, Charles Owens, George Bohannon, Bobby Rodriguez, Patrice Rushen, Roberto Miranda, and others. These sessions were recorded over two days in May 2006 at the Quincy Jones / Michael Jackson designed signature studio, 'D', at Westlake Recording Studios, with the UCLA's and CJO's Charley Harrison serving as MD. The album was conceived and self-produced by actor and amateur baritone, Tom Mark. Vocals were recorded by Mark at Westlake Recording Studios in May and November 2006. Bregman also recorded 'scratch' vocals against each and every one of his own session-tracks during studio downtime at Westlake.

== Personal life and death ==
Bregman and actress Gloria Haley obtained a mutual-consent divorce in Juarez, Mexico, in 1957. Their divorce in a court in Los Angeles became final on August 29, 1958. In 1959 Bregman was engaged to singer Anna Maria Alberghetti, for whom he arranged music. Her mother opposed their plans to marry. Bregman was married to actress Suzanne Lloyd from 1961 to 1988; the couple had a daughter, Tracey E. Bregman, an actress on television soap operas. On January 8, 2017, she confirmed that Bregman had died from complications of Alzheimer's disease, which he had suffered from for many years.
