= Danny Dayton =

American actor (1923–1999)

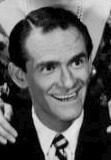
- Dayton in 1959
- Born: Daniel David Segall; November 20, 1923; Jersey City, New Jersey, U.S.
- Died: February 6, 1999 (aged 75); Los Angeles, California, U.S.
- Other name: Dan Dayton
- Occupations: Actor, television director
- Years active: 1949–1999
- Spouse(s): Dagmar (1951-1961); Arlene Allinson (1963-1999) (his death)

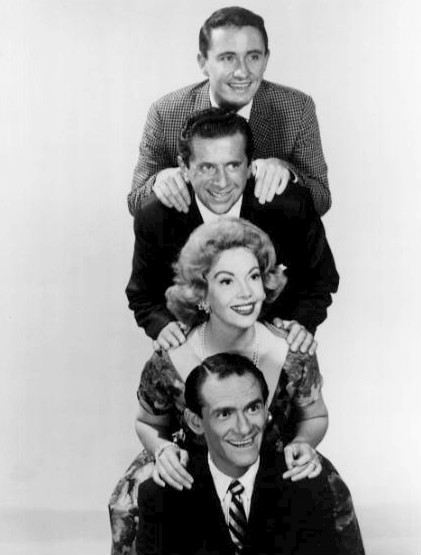
Panelists on TV game show Keep Talking (1959). From top: Merv Griffin, Morey Amsterdam, Audrey Meadows and Danny Dayton

Danny Dayton (born Daniel David Segall; November 20, 1923 – February 6, 1999) was an American actor and television director. Beginning in the 1950s, he played many roles in film and on TV. He had a recurring role as Hank Pivnik on All in the Family and had guest roles in M*A*S*H, The Incredible Hulk, Charlie's Angels and The Love Boat.

== Early years ==
Dayton was born Daniel David Segall on November 20, 1923, in Jersey City, New Jersey to a Jewish family. He graduated from the school of journalism at New York University (NYU), before turning to acting. He formed the first dramatic society at NYU. After he left NYU he joined the Army, helping to entertain troops as a member of Special Services.

== Career ==
Danny Dayton's sharp-featured, hawk-nosed face made him a ready candidate for Runyonesque gangster and sharpie roles, often in comedies. His Broadway appearances included Guys and Dolls (1950), A Funny Thing Happened on the Way to the Forum (1962, later replacing star Zero Mostel), and I Had a Ball (1964).

Dayton's work with television dated back to the 1950s with Milton Berle on Texaco Star Theater. He was also involved with several New-York based TV shows as an actor or staff member: a performer on The Phil Silvers Show, a panelist on the game show Keep Talking; associate producer of Masquerade Party, and straight-man foil to comedians Joey Faye and Mickey Deems on Mack and Myer for Hire. In addition to acting, Dayton also directed episodes of Occasional Wife, Here's Lucy, and the short-lived series Good Morning World. He was still working as an actor in the 1980s and 1990s (Police Squad, The Nanny, Friends, etc.).

== Personal life and death ==
Dayton married actress Dagmar in Las Vegas in May 1951; they divorced in 1961. His second marriage, in 1963, to Arlene Allinson lasted the rest of his life; the couple had four children.

On February 6, 1999, Dayton died of emphysema in Cedars-Sinai Medical Center in Los Angeles, California.

== Recognition ==
Dayton's work in directing TV commercials brought him three Clio Awards, the Cannes Film Festival Award, McMahon's Best 100, and the Addy Award for Excellence.

== Filmography ==
Film
Year	Title	Role	Notes
1950	At War with the Army	Supply Sgt. Miller	A Martin & Lewis comedy; credited as Dan Dayton
1951	The Enforcer	Digger	Uncredited
1951	No Questions Asked	Harry Dycker	
1952	The Turning Point	Roy Ackerman	
1955	Guys and Dolls	Rusty Charlie	
1970	Which Way to the Front?	Man in Car	A Jerry Lewis comedy
1978	Loose Shoes	Bartender	Alternative titles: Coming Attractions and Quackers
1979	Love At First Bite	Billy, first bellboy	
1981	Circle of Power	David Arnold	
1983	The Sting II	Ring Announcer	
1985	Appointment with Fear	Norman	
1987	Flicks	Ogden Flood	(segment 'House of the Living Corpse')
1991	The Dark Backward	Syd	
1991	Life Stinks	Dirty Bum at Party	
1991	Rock 'n' Roll High School Forever	Mr. Snotgrass	
1994	Ed Wood	Soundman	
Television
Year	Title	Role	Notes
1950	Joey Faye's Frolics	Himself	2 episodes
1956–1958	The Phil Silvers Show	Sergeant Coogan	7 episodes
1969	The United States Steel Hour	Mr. Doyle	1 episode
1965	The Nurses	Pete	1 episode
1967	Gomer Pyle, U.S.M.C.	Clarence Quimby	1 episode
1969	Get Smart	Cabbie	1 episode
1975	Barney Miller	Harry	1 episode
1976	Sanford and Son	Timmy	1 episode
1976–1979	All in the Family	Hank Pivnik	15 episodes
1977–1979	Barnaby Jones	Sammy / Freddy	2 episodes
1978	Wonder Woman	Louis the Lithuanian	1 episode
1979–1980	Archie Bunker's Place	Hank Pivnik	10 episodes
1980	The Incredible Hulk	Skipper	1 episode
1981	CHiPs	Kelly	1 episode
1981	M*A*S*H	Fast Freddie	1 Story 2 episodes That's Show Biz
1982	Police Squad!	Joey	1 episode
1982	Hart To Hart	Butler	1 episode
1984	Automan	Bookie	1 episode
1984	Airwolf	Sam the Counterman	1 episode
1985	Simon & Simon	Jeweler Joe Wilson	1 episode
1986	You Again?	Herb	1 episode
1986	The New Alfred Hitchcock Presents	Buzzy Carelli	1 episode
1986	Sledge Hammer!	Assassin with knife	1 episode
1988	The Hogan Family	Stu	1 episode
1988	The Facts of Life	Mr. Avery	1 episode
1988–1989	It's Garry Shandling's Show	Mr. Peck	4 episodes
1989	Mama's Family	Shecky Lewis	1 episode
1990	Father Dowling Mysteries	Harvey Gorsky	1 episode
1992	Down the Shore	Jackie	1 episode
1995	ER	Art	1 episode
1995	Friends	Buddy Doyle	1 episode
1996	Sisters	Morty Meyerhoff	1 episode
1996	Caroline in the City	Leo Ladman	1 episode
1997	The Nanny	Keith Rosenstein	1 episode
1997	Mad About You	Old Man #1	1 episode
1997	Mike Hammer, Private Eye	Laddie Buck	1 episode
1999	Zoe, Duncan, Jack and Jane	Uncle Sy	1 episode, (final appearance)
