= Dick Clark's World of Talent =

US television program

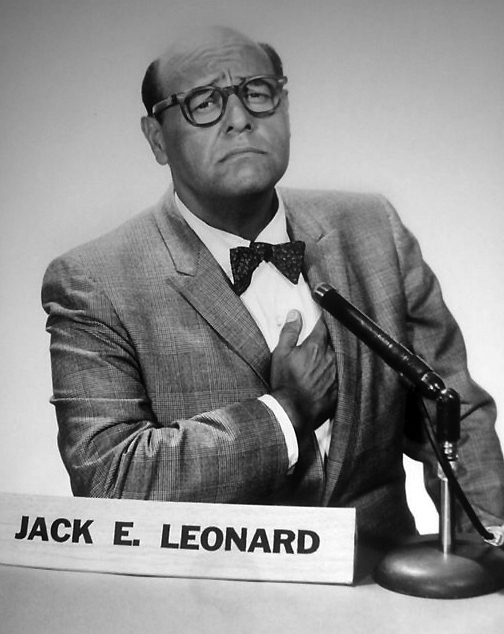
- Jack E. Leonard on the show
- Created by: Irving Mansfield
- Presented by: Dick Clark
- No. of seasons: 1
- No. of episodes: 13

Production
- Production locations: ABC's TV-2 Studio; 26 West 6th Street, New York City
- Running time: 30 minutes

Original release
- Network: ABC
- Release: September 27 – December 20, 1959

Dick Clark's World of Talent is a talent/variety television show produced by Irving Mansfield and broadcast weekly in the United States on the ABC television network from 10:30-11 p.m. (ET) on Sundays during the 1959-60 season.

== History ==
The first show was broadcast September 27, 1959. Dick Clark hosted throughout the run of the series. Permanent judge Jack E. Leonard, and two celebrity "guest" judges watched the performances of amateur, semi-professional (and, on occasion, professional) singers, musicians, dancers, and comedians, and offered advice. Some of the guest judges were Johnny Carson, Betty Hutton, Zsa Zsa Gabor, Tab Hunter, Edie Adams, Eva Gabor, and Sam Levenson.

== Performers ==
Guests on the show included:

- R&B singer Tommy Edwards (broadcast October 18, 1959)
- Classical pianist Lorin Hollander (broadcast October 4 or 11 or 18, 1959)
- Folk music duo Bud and Travis
- Big–band singer Don Cornell
- Cocktail singer Alan Dale
- Vocal quartet the Four Aces
- Singer/actress Della Reese (broadcast November 15, 1959)

== Last show ==
The last show was broadcast December 20, 1959.
