= The Eddie Fisher Show =

American musical comedy/variety TV series (1957–1959)

- Genre: Comedy; Music; Variety
- Written by: Mac Benoff; Buddy Bregman; Martin Ragaway
- Directed by: Barry Shear
- Starring: Eddie Fisher; George Gobel; Debbie Reynolds; Gisele MacKenzie; Mary Tyler Moore
- Theme music composer: Jule Styne (music); Sammy Cahn
- Opening theme: As Long as There's Music
- Ending theme: As Long as There's Music (instrumental)
- Composers: Buddy Bregman; Johnny Mann
- Country of origin: United States
- Original language: English
- No. of seasons: 2
- No. of episodes: 27

Production
- Producers: Gil Rodin; Berle Adams
- Running time: 60 minutes

Original release
- Network: NBC
- Release: October 1, 1957 – March 17, 1959

Related
- The George Gobel Show

The Eddie Fisher Show is an American musical comedy/variety television series starring Eddie Fisher. The series alternated on Tuesday nights with The George Gobel Show with episodes running from October 1, 1957 – March 17, 1959 on NBC. George Gobel was a "permanent guest star" on Fisher's program, as Fisher was on Gobel's show. Debbie Reynolds, who was Fisher's wife at the time, occasionally was a guest star.

== Synopsis ==
Singer and entertainer Eddie Fisher had just concluded a four-year run on NBC with a 15-minute variety and musical comedy series Coke Time with Eddie Fisher in 1957. NBC premiered The Eddie Fisher Show on October 1, 1957. The show alternated on Tuesday nights with The George Gobel Show airing from 8:00-9:00 pm for its entire run.

== Cancellation ==
Fisher was married to actress Debbie Reynolds. The two divorced in 1959 and Fisher went on to marry Elizabeth Taylor. Fisher and Reynolds' divorce was very much publicized and after several months of scandals and unflattering publicity for Fisher, NBC decided to cancel the show with its last episode airing on March 27, 1959.

== Personnel and production ==
Buddy Bregman and his orchestra provided music on The Eddie Fisher Show In 1957-1958, The Bill Thompson Singers were on the show, as were The Johnny Mann Singers in 1959. Bregman also arranged music for the program. The theme song was "As Long As There's Music" by Sammy Kahn and Jule Styne. Jule Styne was the producer, and Barry Shear was the director. The writers were Herbert Baker, Harvey Orkin, and Joe Quillan.

Guest stars on the program included The Lennon Sisters, Charles Laughton, Mike Todd, Terry Burnham, and Betty Grable.

== Critical response ==
A review of the premiere episode in the trade publication Variety said that Fisher was "still a lightweight" for an hour-long show (in contrast with his previous 15-minute program), but "the initial show indicates that he can grow into this mold". The review complimented Reynolds's performance and the Fisher-Gobel combination and said that overall the episode "gave a good measure of entertainment."
