= Jazz Party (TV series) =

- Genre: Music
- Directed by: Ted Cott
- Presented by: Art Ford
- Country of origin: United States
- Original language: English
- No. of seasons: 1
- No. of episodes: 30

Production
- Running time: 90 minutes
- Production companies: WNTA-TV; NTA Film Network

Original release
- Release: May 8 – December 25, 1958

Jazz Party, also known as Art Ford's Jazz Party, is a TV series featuring jazz musicians on WNTA-TV in New York City, which aired on Thursdays at 9pm ET from May 8, 1958, to December 25, 1958. It was a music-focused continuation of Art Ford's Greenwich Village Party, arguably the last series to appear on the DuMont Television Network, which ceased operations on August 6, 1956, though only broadcast on WABD as that station was becoming WNEW-TV after the sale of the DuMont-owned stations to Metromedia.

The 90-minute shows hosted by Art Ford (1921–2006), were distributed by the NTA Film Network. The shows also aired on Armed Forces Television. All episodes were filmed in a New Jersey studio, except for the final episode, which was recorded on August 11, 1958, in New Orleans, and aired on December 25.

Musicians who appeared on the series included Billie Holiday, Coleman Hawkins, Henry "Red" Allen, Pee Wee Russell, Marty Napoleon, Georgie Auld, Buster Bailey, Vinnie Burke, Roy Eldridge, J. C. Higginbotham, Les Paul, Urbie Green, Dick Hyman, Anita O'Day, Connee Boswell, Mae Barnes, Chris Connor, Sylvia Syms, Mary Osborne, Teddy Charles, Harry Sheppard, Maxine Sullivan, Alec Templeton, Abbey Lincoln, Tyree Glenn, and many others.

== See also ==
- List of programs broadcast by the DuMont Television Network
- List of surviving DuMont Television Network broadcasts
- 1958–59 United States network television schedule
