= Confession (American TV series) =

- Genre: Interview/discussion
- Directed by: Paytrick Fay
- Starring: Jack Wyatt
- Country of origin: United States
- Original language: English
- No. of seasons: 1

Production
- Running time: 30 mins.

Original release
- Network: WFAA (1957–1958); ABC (1958––1959)
- Release: 1957 – January 13, 1959

Confession is an American interview television series. Hosted by Jack Wyatt, the show explored the root causes of crime and possible ways of addressing them. The series aired locally in the Dallas, Texas, area beginning early in 1957 and nationally on ABC during the summer of 1958 and the 1958–1959 television season.

== Synopsis ==
In each episode, host Jack Wyatt interviews a convicted criminal who has been vetted and approved by local police officials, discussing his or her crimes and reasons for committing them. After the interview, Wyatt moderates a discussion by a panel which includes a lawyer, a member of the clergy, either a psychiatrist or a psychologist, and either a penologist or a sociologist, during which the panelists analyze the interview and suggest ways of reforming the criminal.

== Production ==
Patrick Fay directed Confession, which began as a live local program in Dallas, Texas, broadcast from the studios of WFAA. With relatively few network shows to broadcast during prime time during the late 1950s, ABC picked up the show for network broadcast to help fill out its schedule during the summer of 1958, and continued to broadcast it during the first half of the 1958–1959 season. Episodes for ABC were videotaped at WFAA.

Although its live local broadcasts in Dallas prior to its ABC run commonly prompted a flood of telephoned complaints to WFAA after each episode, the little-watched series managed to avoid some of the strict censorship that constrained the content of most other television shows of the 1950s. This allowed it to cover a variety of topics rarely permitted on the air by censors and sponsors of the era, including the crimes of drug addicts, prostitutes, sex offenders, and murderers. In one of its more notable 1957 episodes, Darrell Wayne Kahler, a 22-year-old male transvestite arrested for vagrancy while drunk, dressed as a woman, and being molested by three men, discussed his dysfunctional upbringing, his heavy use of alcohol and cigarettes, and his work as a "B girl" at a nightclub, and police allowed him to dress in a black cocktail dress to reenact his arrest for Wyatt's interview. The Kahler episode brought the show to national attention and prompted ABC to pick it up for network broadcast.

== Broadcast history ==
Confession premiered as a local program on WFAA in Dallas, Texas, in early 1957. It began its national run on ABC on June 19, 1958, airing on Thursdays at 10:00 p.m. Eastern Time until September 1958, when it moved to Tuesday at 10:00 p.m. Eastern Time. The show faced stiff competition on both NBC and CBS, and it was cancelled at mid-season. Its last episode was broadcast on January 13, 1959. Alcoa Presents: One Step Beyond replaced it in ABC's schedule.
