= Frontier Justice (TV series) =

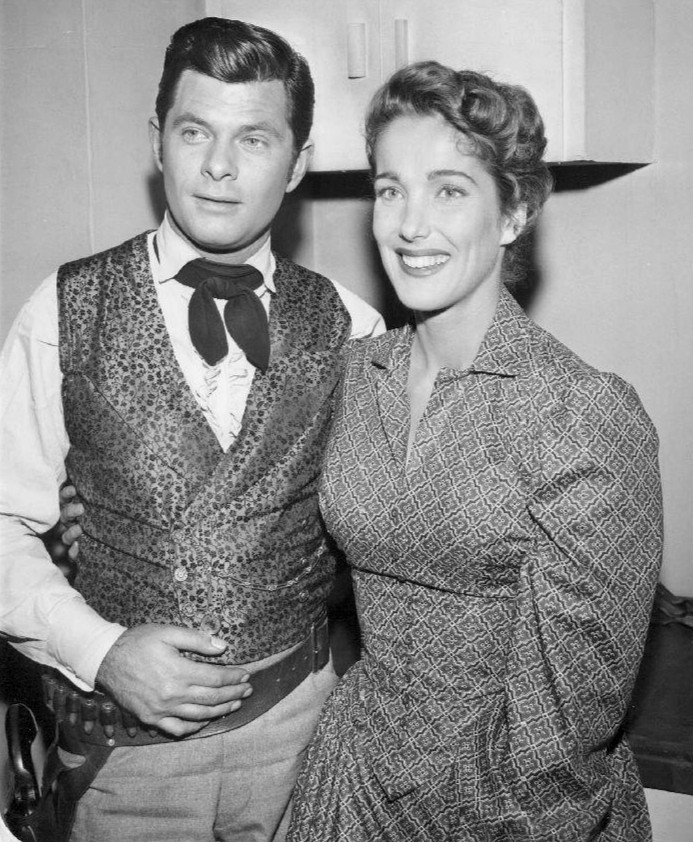
- Dewey Martin and Julie Adams in an episode of Frontier Justice (1959)
- Starring: Lew Ayres; Melvyn Douglas; Ralph Bellamy
- Country of origin: United States
- No. of seasons: 3
- No. of episodes: 31

Production
- Running time: 30 minutes

Original release
- Network: CBS
- Release: July 7, 1958 – September 28, 1961

Frontier Justice is a CBS Western anthology television series which aired over the summers of 1958, 1959, and 1961. There were thirty-one telecasts.

It was a repackaging of episodes from CBS's Dick Powell's Zane Grey Theatre with a different host each year. Lew Ayres was the host in 1958, when the show replaced December Bride. Melvyn Douglas was host in 1959, when it replaced The Danny Thomas Show and was sponsored by General Foods (for Post cereals and Sanka). Ralph Bellamy was the host in 1961. The program was a production of Four Star Television.

The 1959 version was broadcast on Mondays from 9 to 9:30 p.m. Eastern Time.
