= 21 Beacon Street =

American television series

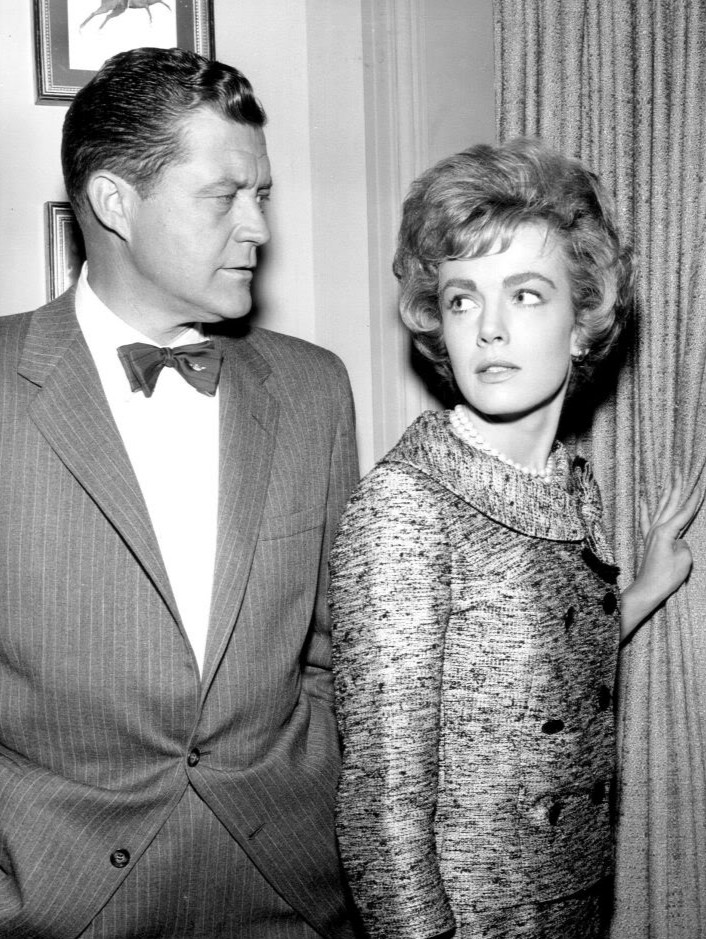
- Dennis Morgan and Joanna Barnes
- Starring: Dennis Morgan, Joanna Barnes, Brian Kelly and James Maloney
- Country of origin: United States
- Original language: English

Production
- Running time: 25 minutes
- Production company: Filmways

Original release
- Network: NBC
- Release: July 2 – September 24, 1959

21 Beacon Street is an American detective television series that originally aired on NBC from July 2 to September 10, 1959.

Produced by Filmways, the summer replacement series for The Tennessee Ernie Ford Show consisted of 11 black-and-white 30-minute episodes. The show starred Dennis Morgan as private investigator Dennis Chase. Other cast members included Joanna Barnes, Brian Kelly, and James Maloney.

The series pilot was broadcast as an episode of Panic!. The show aired on Thursdays at 9:30 p.m. Eastern Time. Reruns were broadcast on ABC-TV on Sundays at 10:30 p.m. from December 1959 to March 1960.

Leonard Heideman was the show's creator. The series' first episode was "The Rub-Out".

== Premise ==
Dennis Chase was a private investigator with an office on 21 Beacon Street, in an unspecified city. Chase was aided by Joanna Barnes as Joanna, who was a combination of beauty and brains. She was able to glean information and then act as a decoy. Brian Kelly was Brian, a young law school graduate; and James Maloney played Jim, an expert on dialects, as well as a skilled craftsman.

Chase and his assistants worked to discover who the criminals were, but then notified the police to come and apprehend the law breakers.

== Forerunner to Mission Impossible ==
The producers of Mission: Impossible were sued for plagiarism by the creators of 21 Beacon Street. The suit was settled out of court. Bruce Geller claimed never to have seen the earlier show; Beacon Street's creator, under the name Laurence Heath (a pseudonym Heideman adopted following his release from a mental institution after murdering his wife during a psychotic breakdown), would later write several episodes of Mission: Impossible.

== Episodes ==
No.	Title	Directed by	Written by	Original release date
1	"The Rub Out"	Maurice Geraghty	Robert C. Dennis	July 2, 1959
2	"Safety Deposit"	Harold Schuster	Story by : John Meredyth Lucas; Teleplay by : Leonard Heideman	July 9, 1959
3	"The Payoff"	Maurice Geraghty	Tom Gries	July 16, 1959
4	"Double Vision"	Jean Yarbrough	Story by : Jack Kelsey; Teleplay by : Jack Kelsey and Leonard Heideman	July 23, 1959
5	"The Swindle"	Maurice Geraghty	Story by : Orville H. Hampton; Teleplay by : Leonard Heideman	July 30, 1959
6	"The Execution"	Jean Yarbrough	John Meredyth Lucas	August 6, 1959
7	"Break In"	Maurice Geraghty	Leonard Heideman	August 13, 1959
8	"The Trojan Horse"	Maurice Geraghty	Betty Halsey	August 20, 1959
9	"The Hostage"	Jean Yarbrough	Story by : David Chandler; Teleplay by : Jack Laird	August 27, 1959
10	"The Trap"	Val Raset	Story by : Fenton Earnshaw; Teleplay by : Leonard Heideman and Fenton Earnshaw	September 3, 1959
11	"Dilemma"	Jean Yarbrough	Leonard Heideman	September 10, 1959
12	"Nothing is Impossible"	Val Raset	Story by : Clayton Rawson; Teleplay by : Leonard Heideman	September 17, 1959
13	"Close Call"	Harold Schuster	Leonard Heideman	September 24, 1959
