= Polka Go-Round =

Polka Go-Round was a polka music and dancing show that aired on ABC from 1958 to 1959.

Polka Go-Round with Lou Prohut and the Polka Go Rounders began in the spring of 1958 on WBKB in Chicago, Illinois. It was the successor to ABC's first prime-time polka show, It's Polka Time with Stan Wolowic and the Polka Chips. The singers and dancers on Polka Go-Round wore colorful costumes and performed in an outdoor café setting.

Polka Go-Round′s featured vocalist and yodeler, Carolyn DeZurik, had also been featured at times on It’s Polka Time. Bob Lewandowski was the master of ceremonies and a vocalist. Also appearing were the Caine (or Chaine) Dancers, Tom "Stubby" Fouts, the Singing Waiters, and Georgia Drake. Band members were DeZurik′s husband Rusty Gill, guitar; Jack Cordaro, clarinet, saxophone, and flute; Jimmy James, banjo; Len Druss, clarinet, saxophone, and flute; Clay Campbell, drums; and Jimmie Hutchinson, bass guitar and banjo.

Polka Go-Round was produced at WBKB's 190 North State Street studios and broadcast locally by WBKB Channel 7. It aired nationally on the ABC television network from June 23, 1958, to September 28, 1959. As an hour-long program, it was broadcast as a summer replacement for Lawrence Welk's Top Tunes and New Talent on ABC on Mondays, at 9:30 p.m. Eastern Time from June to mid-August 1958, and at 7:30 p.m. Eastern from October to December 1958. Shortened to a half-hour, it aired at 8:00 p.m. Eastern from December 1958 to May 1959. It then returned to a one-hour format and a 7:30 p.m. Eastern broadcast time from June 1959 to the end of its run in September 1959.
