= The David Niven Show =

American TV anthology series (1959)

- Genre: Anthology series
- Country of origin: United States
- Original language: English
- No. of seasons: 1
- No. of episodes: 13 (list of episodes)

Production
- Running time: 30 minutes
- Production companies: Amalfi Films; Four Star Productions

Original release
- Network: NBC
- Release: April 7 – July 7, 1959

The David Niven Show is an American half-hour television anthology series that was broadcast from April 7, 1959, through September 15, 1959.

== Premise ==
This series is an anthology series hosted by David Niven. He acted in one episode.

== Episodes ==
No.	Title	Directed by	Written by	Original release date
1	"Fortune's Folly"	Lewis Allen	Unknown	April 7, 1959
Hal's wife wants to divorce him because of his gambling.
2	"Lifeline"	Robert Florey	Alfred Brenner	April 14, 1959
A criminal hides in an amusement park.
3	"Backtrack"	Lewis Allen	Gene Levitt	April 21, 1959
A husband and a wife are blackmailed by an ex-mistress.
4	"The Promise"	Thomas Carr	Leonard Freeman	May 5, 1959
A family suffers the loss of a child.
5	"The Twist of the Key"	Don McDougall	Hank Moonjean	May 12, 1959
A quiet couple becomes involved in a mystery when they have new neighbors.
6	"A Day of Small Miracles"	Lewis Allen	Leonard Praskins	May 19, 1959
A couple is concerned about the health of their son and gets help from a magician.
7	"The Lady from Winnetka"	Unknown	Unknown	May 26, 1959
A woman finds romance with a suave tour guide on a Mediterranean isle.
8	"The Last Room"	Lewis Allen	Frederick J. Lipp	June 2, 1959
A police interrogator tries to find information with threats and torture.
9	"Maggie Malone"	Unknown	Unknown	June 9, 1959
The owners of a successful nightclub are threatened by gangsters.
10	"Portrait"	Thomas Carr	Aaron Spelling	June 16, 1959
A group of American soldiers in World War II try to find a mystery woman.
11	"Sticks and Stones"	Unknown	Unknown	June 23, 1959
The wife of a professional baseball player starts receiving threatening letters.
12	"The Vengeance"	Don McDougall	John Robinson	June 30, 1959
A judge is stalked by an escaped prisoner.
13	"The Good Deed"	Thomas Carr	John Robinson	July 7, 1959
A journalist is asked to negotiate on the behalf of a fugitive.

== Guest stars ==
- Eddie Albert
- Jacques Bergerac
- Eddie Bracken
- Joanne Dru
- Dan Duryea
- Anne Francis
- Carolyn Jones
- Julie London
- Frank Lovejoy
- Cameron Mitchell
- Susan Oliver
- Fay Wray

== Production ==
The David Niven Show was produced by Four Star Productions. Vincent Fennelly produced the show, which was broadcast on NBC on Tuesdays from 10 to 10:30 p.m. Eastern Time, replacing The Californians. Don Quinn wrote Niven's introductions to episodes, and Niven helped Fennelly select scripts.

Episodes broadcast July 14, 1959, through September 15, 1959, were reruns.

Niven said that he and the show's sponsor undertook the program with the understanding that it would continue in the fall of 1959. "It was never my intention -- nor that of my sponsor -- to do a summer replacement type of series," he said. After the show began, NBC told them that when the new season arrived the time slot would be used for weekly specials. Niven added, "If we knew this was going to happen before we started, we would not have bothered to begin."

== Critical response ==
A review by Harriet Van Horne in the El Paso Herald-Post used Niven's role on The David Niven Show as an example of established actors on TV who "use the medium a bit contemptuously". She cited his "minute, maybe less" time on screen to introduce a drama and his post-drama return "for as long as it took to point the moral", adding, "I expect most of us would have been even more grateful for a David Niven Show starring David Niven." As for the drama itself, Van Horne wrote that "Fortune's Folly" made her feel "that I've seen it eight or nine times before", and she called it "a cynical little story, despite Mr. Mitchell's excellent performance."

In a review in the Oakland Tribune, Bill Fiset had a different view of that episode, calling the 30-minute drama "the finest in a long time". Fiset wrote that the show "was tightly written and well done, with no tricks or gimmicks."

== Home video ==
In April 2014, 12 of the 13 episodes produced were released in a 2-DVD set by Simply Media in the UK. "Episode 9, "Maggie Malone", is missing.
