= Markham (TV series) =

American television drama series

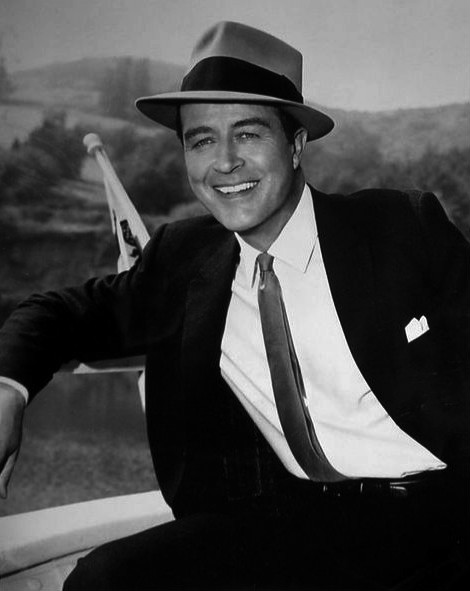
- Milland as Markham.
- Genre: Crime drama
- Starring: Ray Milland
- Theme music composer: Stanley Wilson
- Composers: Juan Esquivel (as: ESQUIVEL); John Williams ("Woman of Arles"); Nathan Scott ("The Seamark")
- Country of origin: United States
- Original language: English
- No. of seasons: 2
- No. of episodes: 60

Production
- Producers: Warren Duff; Joseph Sistrom
- Running time: 30 minutes
- Production companies: Markham Production Company; Revue Studios

Original release
- Network: CBS
- Release: May 2, 1959 – September 15, 1960

Markham is an American crime drama series starring Ray Milland, which aired on CBS from May 2, 1959, until September 22, 1960, following Gunsmoke on Saturday nights (later appearing on Thursday nights at 9:30 P.M. Eastern, after January 1960), under the sponsorship of the Joseph Schlitz Brewing Company. At the beginning of the second season, Liggett & Myers became an alternate sponsor, succeeded by Renault when the series moved to Thursdays.

== Plot ==
Milland played private investigator and attorney Roy Markham (previously introduced in a June 1958 Suspicion episode, "Eye For An Eye", itself based on a Leigh Brackett novel). In that Markham had been a successful lawyer, he had the leisure to take detective cases based on his own interest. His fees could vary from the very considerable for his wealthier and corporate clients, to nothing for those who desperately needed his services but had few financial means. Markham's cases could take him almost anywhere in the world, although he was based in New York City.

In the early episodes of this program, Markham had an assistant, John Riggs (Simon Scott), but the Riggs character was written out after only eight programs had aired. From then on Markham solved crimes solo.

== Guest stars ==
Dayton Lummis appeared as Howard Fulton in the 1959 episode titled "The Father". Rodolfo Hoyos Jr., played Chief Gomez in the 1959 episode "The Bay of the Dead". Carole Mathews appeared as Jan Van Pelt in another 1959 episode, "The Glass Diamond". Elen Willard—as Ellen Willard—appeared as Markham's niece, Deidre Waugh, in the series' penultimate episode, "The Bad Spell", in September 1960.

== Episodes ==
=== Season 1 (1959) ===
No. overall	No. in season	Title	Directed by	Written by	Original release date
1	1	"A Princely Sum"	Richard Bartlett	Story by : Joel Murcott; Teleplay by : Robert C. Dennis	May 2, 1959
2	2	"Woman of Arles"	Gerd Oswald	Jo Swerling	May 9, 1959
3	3	"Paris Encounter"	Bretaigne Windust	Story by : Oscar Millard; Teleplay by : Robert C. Dennis	May 16, 1959
4	4	"The Marble Face"	Bretaigne Windust	Story by : Charles Beaumont & Richard Matheson; Teleplay by : John Kneubuhl	May 23, 1959
5	5	"The Human Factor"	Don Weis	Charles Larson	May 30, 1959
6	6	"The Seamark"	Robert Florey	Stirling Silliphant	June 6, 1959
7	7	"Three Steps to Murder"	Robert Florey	Stirling Silliphant	June 13, 1959
8	8	"The Glass Diamond"	Herschel Daugherty	Story by : Kathleen Hite; Teleplay by : John Kneubuhl & Jean Holloway	June 20, 1959
9	9	"Vendetta in Venice"	Robert Florey	Jonathan Latimer	June 27, 1959
10	10	"The Last Bullet"	Robert B. Sinclair	Story by : Robert C. Dennis; Teleplay by : Robert C. Dennis & David P. Harmon	July 4, 1959
11	11	"Forty-Two on a Rope"	Douglas Heyes	Douglas Heyes	July 11, 1959
12	12	"The Duelists"	Don Medford	Stirling Silliphant	July 18, 1959
13	13	"The Counterfeit Stamp"	Bretaigne Windust	Story by : Judy & George W. George; Teleplay by : David Evans and Judy & George W. George	July 25, 1959
14	14	"We Are All Suspect"	Bretaigne Windust	Story by : Ed Lacy; Teleplay by : Stanford Whitmore & Robert C. Dennis	August 1, 1959
15	15	"The Bay of the Dead"	Bretaigne Windust	Story by : Alvin Pevehouse; Teleplay by : Herschel Berard	August 8, 1959
16	16	"The Other Side of the Wall"	Unknown	Unknown	August 15, 1959
17	17	"Deadline Date"	Richard Bartlett	Norman Jolley	August 22, 1959
18	18	"Girl on the Rocks"	Frank Arrigo	Richard Morgan	August 29, 1959

=== Season 2 (1959–60) ===
No. overall	No. in season	Title	Directed by	Written by	Original release date
19	1	"Grave and Present Danger"	Unknown	Unknown	September 19, 1959
20	2	"Double Negative"	Unknown	Unknown	September 26, 1959
21	3	"The Nephews"	John Rich	Stirling Silliphant	October 3, 1959
22	4	"The Long Haul"	Unknown	Unknown	October 10, 1959
23	5	"Mutation"	Herschel Daugherty	Stirling Silliphant	October 17, 1959
24	6	"The Father"	Unknown	Unknown	October 31, 1959
25	7	"Incident in Bel Air"	Robert Florey	Oscar Millard	November 7, 1959
26	8	"Round Trip to Mozambique"	Robert Florey	Story by : Bob Williams; Teleplay by : Oscar Millard	November 14, 1959
27	9	"Strange Visitor"	Unknown	Unknown	November 21, 1959
28	10	"The Altar"	Herschel Daugherty	Stirling Silliphant	December 5, 1959
29	11	"No Flies on Friday"	Robert Ellis Miller	Story by : Kem Bennett; Teleplay by : Oscar Millard	December 19, 1959
30	12	"Candy Store Jungle"	Unknown	Unknown	January 9, 1960
31	13	"Sing a Song of Murder"	Unknown	Unknown	January 16, 1960
32	14	"The Ambitious Wife"	Unknown	Unknown	January 23, 1960
33	15	"Events Leading Up to the Crime"	Unknown	Unknown	January 28, 1960
34	16	"A Coffin for Cinderella"	Unknown	Unknown	February 4, 1960
35	17	"Deadly Promise"	Unknown	Unknown	February 11, 1960
36	18	"One for the Money"	Unknown	Unknown	February 25, 1960
37	19	"Image of Love"	Unknown	Unknown	March 3, 1960
38	20	"The Long Search"	Unknown	Unknown	March 10, 1960
39	21	"The Shape of Evil"	Unknown	Unknown	March 24, 1960
40	22	"The Phantom Archer"	Unknown	Unknown	March 31, 1960
41	23	"The Searing Flame"	Unknown	Unknown	April 7, 1960
42	24	"Fateful Reunion"	Unknown	Unknown	April 14, 1960
43	25	"The Last Oasis"	Unknown	Unknown	April 21, 1960
44	26	"The Anixous Angel"	Unknown	Unknown	April 28, 1960
45	27	"The Sitting Duck"	Unknown	Unknown	May 5, 1960
46	28	"The Snarled Web"	Unknown	Unknown	May 12, 1960
47	29	"Coercion"	Unknown	Unknown	May 26, 1960
48	30	"The Man from Salzburg"	Mitchell Leisen	Ronkel Adams	June 2, 1960
49	31	"The Silken Cord"	Unknown	Unknown	June 9, 1960
50	32	"Escorts a La Carte"	Mitchell Leisen	Donald S. Sanford	June 16, 1960
51	33	"The Crueliest Thief"	Unknown	Unknown	June 30, 1960
52	34	"13 Avenida Muerte"	Unknown	Unknown	July 7, 1960
53	35	"A Cry from the Penthouse"	Mitchell Leisen	Story by : Henry Slesar; Teleplay by : Stephen Burl	July 21, 1960
54	36	"The Young Conspirator"	Unknown	Unknown	August 4, 1960
55	37	"The Country Mouse"	Unknown	Unknown	August 11, 1960
56	38	"Crash in the Desert"	Unknown	Unknown	August 18, 1960
57	39	"Counterpoint"	Unknown	Unknown	August 25, 1960
58	40	"The Snowman"	Unknown	Unknown	September 1, 1960
59	41	"The Bad Spell"	Unknown	Unknown	September 8, 1960
60	42	"A Matter of Identity"	Unknown	Unknown	September 15, 1960

== Production ==
Warren Duff and Joe Sistrom were the show's producers.
