= The Pat Boone Chevy Showroom =

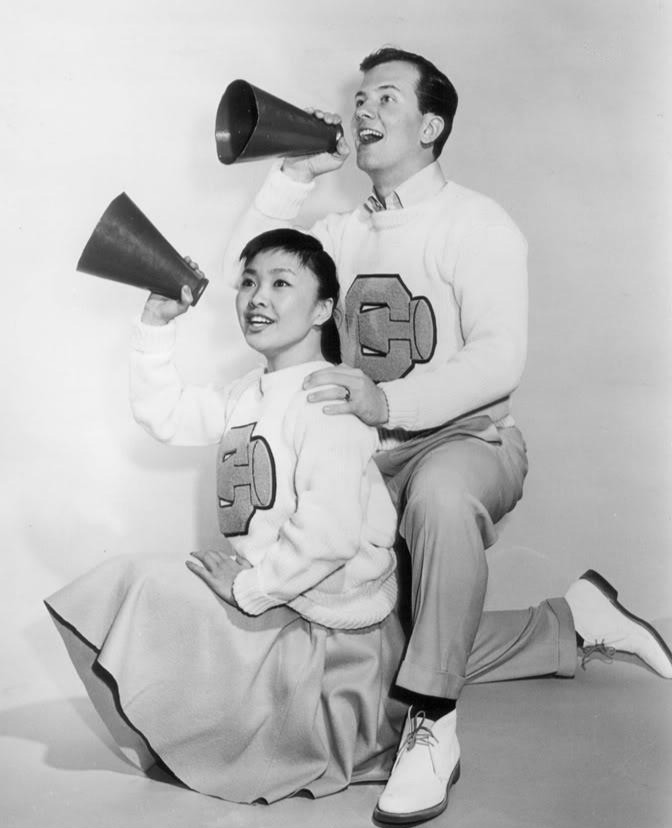
- Pat Suzuki with Pat Boone during The Pat Boone Chevy Showroom, 1959
- Genre: Variety
- Starring: Pat Boone
- Country of origin: United States
- Original language: English
- No. of seasons: 3
- No. of episodes: 115

Production
- Running time: 30 minutes

Original release
- Network: ABC
- Release: 1957 – 1960

The Pat Boone Chevy Showroom was a variety television series that debuted in 1957 and starred 23 year old singer Pat Boone as the host of the half-hour ABC series.

The Pat Boone Chevy Showroom aired for 115 episodes from 1957 to 1960. Several musical performers including Cliff Richard, Nat King Cole, Edie Adams, Andy Williams, Pearl Bailey and Johnny Mathis made appearances on the program.

== Controversy ==
Boone later revealed that he left the series after ABC denied him from having singer Harry Belafonte appear on the show.
