= Pursuit (TV series) =

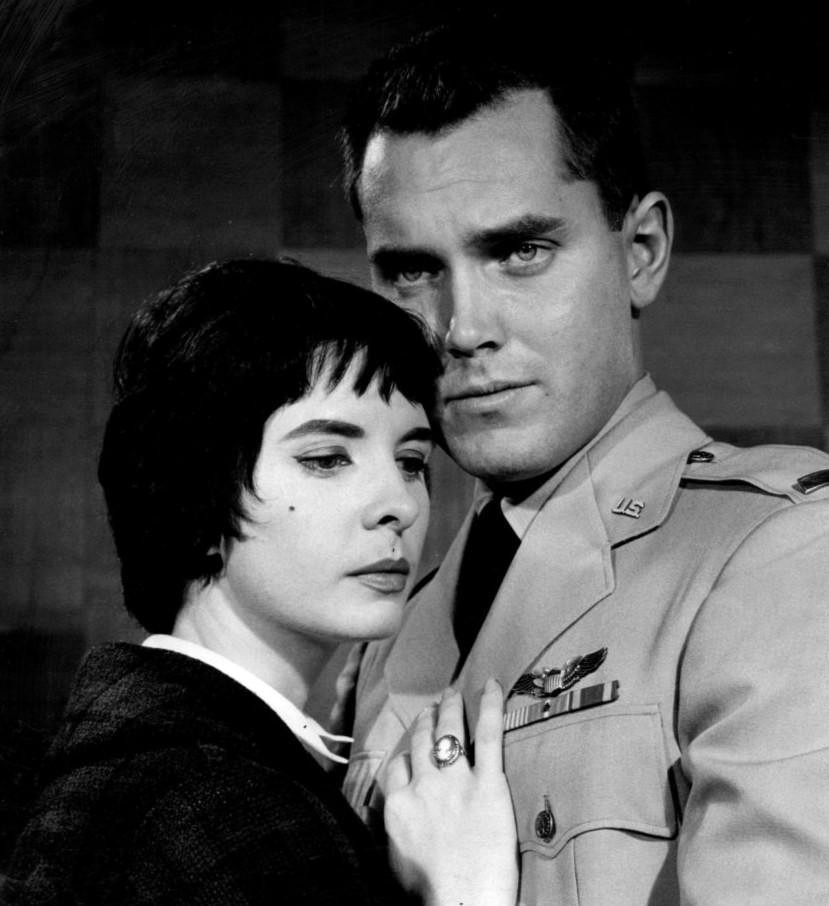
- Margaret O'Brien and Jeffrey Hunter in "Kiss Me Again, Stranger".
- Genre: Anthology
- Directed by: James B. Clark (director); David Greene (director); Herbert Hirschman; Buzz Kulik; Paul Nickell; Daniel Petrie; Paul Stanley (director)
- Composer: Bernard Herrmann
- Country of origin: United States
- Original language: English
- No. of seasons: 1
- No. of episodes: 39

Production
- Executive producer: Norman Felton
- Camera setup: Single-camera
- Running time: 24 mins.

Original release
- Network: CBS
- Release: October 22, 1958 – January 14, 1959

Pursuit is a one-hour American television anthology drama series which aired live on CBS from October 22, 1958, to January 14, 1959.

== Overview ==
As the program's title implies, each episode focused on a person or group that was being pursued.

Plans for the program were under way in December 1957, with Charles Russell moving from New York to the West Coast of the United States to produce the show. Writers engaged in the project were Charles Larsen, Jonathan Latimer, Don Sanford, Robert Soderberg, and Hagar Wilde. The program's pilot, "The Lady Died at Midnight" starred Earl Holliman and was broadcast on February 23, 1958.

Eva Wolas and Charles W. Russell alternated weeks as producers, and the Mennen company had full sponsorship on alternate weeks.

== Episodes ==
Among the presentations were "Kiss Me Again, Stranger", starring Jeffrey Hunter and Margaret O'Brien, "Epitaph For a Golden Girl" starring Michael Rennie, Rip Torn, and Sally Forrest, and Rod Serling's "The Last Night of August", starring Franchot Tone and Dennis Hopper and written by Rod Serling. Other episodes included "Tiger on a Bicycle" (November 12, 1958), with Laraine Day, Dan Duryea, Chester Morris, David Ladd, and Neville Brand, and "The Vengeance" (October 22, 1958), with Sal Mineo, Stu Erwin, Carol Lynley, Macdonald Carey, Vivian Nathan, and Robert Harris.

Some of the actors who were cast in the episodes included: Robert Alda, Martin Balsam, Lew Ayres, John Cassavetes, Joan Caulfield, Jackie Cooper, and Whitney Blake.
