= The Music Shop (American TV series) =

1959 American television series

- Starring: Buddy Bregman
- No. of seasons: 1
- No. of episodes: 9

Production
- Running time: 30 minutes

Original release
- Network: NBC
- Release: January 11 – March 8, 1959

The Music Shop is a music television series on NBC which premiered in 1959 in a Sunday time slot. Hosted by and starring Buddy Bregman, the show attempted to capitalize on the popularity of the related series The Dick Clark Show.

Its first show featured Bobby Darin, Ritchie Valens, The Collins Kids, Gary Crosby, and Sam Butera.

Bregman said that his show differed from Clark's because he sought as guests "the Dean Martins, Frank Sinatras, and Eddie Fishers", rather than just "teen-age recording artists".

The program was also known as the Buddy Bregman Music Show.

== Episodes ==
Air date	Guests
11 January 1959	Milton Berle, Gary Crosby, Bobby Darin, Sam Butera & The Witnesses, Ritchie Valens, The Collins Kids
18 January 1959	Pre-empted by Ten Little Indians.
25 January 1959	Ray Anthony, The Champs, Ed Cochran, The Platters, Connie Freed, Craig Stevens, Eddie Fisher
1 February 1959	George Burns, Jimmy Madden, Jessie Lee Turner, Sonny James, The Teddy Bears
8 February 1959	Jerry Lewis, Jim Backus, Ralph Sanford, Jerry Wallace, The King's Four
13 February 1959	Steve Allen, The Collins Kids, Jesse Belvin, Thomas Wayne, The G-Notes, The Continentals
22 February 1959	Vic Damone, Randy Sparks, The Louis Jordan 5, Lindsay Crosby, Jimmy Darren, Annette Funicello
1 March 1959	Anna Maria Alberghetti, Ray Anthony, Rusty Draper, Scott Engel, The Mulcays, Ralph Sanford
8 March 1959	Billy Eckstine, The Chuck Trio, Sonny James, Dodie Stevens, Johnny O'Neal, Ronnie Height
