= The Court of Last Resort =

American court show (1957–1958)

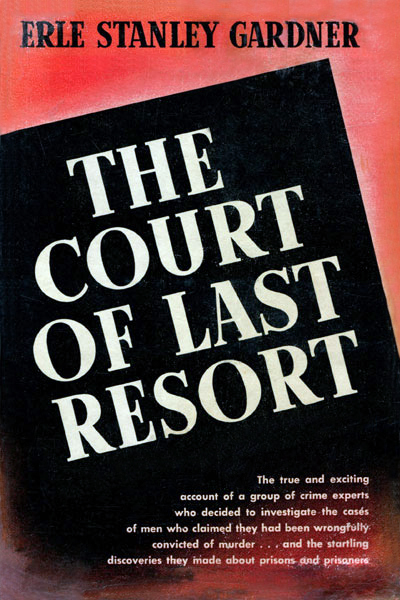
- Erle Stanley Gardner's true-crime column and Edgar Award-winning 1952 book inspired the NBC TV series
- Genre: Dramatized court show
- Created by: Erle Stanley Gardner; Harry Steeger
- Directed by: Tom Gries; Reginald LeBorg
- Starring: Robert H. Harris; Carleton Young; S. John Launer; Lyle Bettger; Robert Anderson
- Theme music composer: Fred Steiner
- Country of origin: United States
- Original language: English
- No. of seasons: 1
- No. of episodes: 26

Production
- Executive producer: Jules C. Goldstone
- Producer: Elliott Lewis
- Production locations: Paisano Productions; California, United States
- Editor: Sherman Todd
- Camera setup: Single-camera
- Running time: 22–24 minutes
- Production companies: Walden Productions, in association with Paisano Productions

Original release
- Network: NBC
- Release: October 4, 1957 – April 11, 1958

The Court of Last Resort is an American television dramatized court show which aired on NBC from October 4, 1957, to April 11, 1958. It was co-produced by Erle Stanley Gardner's Paisano Productions, which also brought forth the long-running hit CBS-TV law series Perry Mason.

== Summary ==
The concept for The Court of Last Resort was developed from a popular true crime column of the same name. Written by lawyer-turned-author Erle Stanley Gardner, the column appeared in the monthly magazine Argosy for ten years beginning in September 1948. Gardner enlisted assistance from police, private detectives, and other professional experts to examine the cases of dozens of convicts who maintained their innocence long after their appeals were exhausted.

The TV show centers on seven attorneys who take on the cases of wrongly accused or unjustly convicted defendants. Episodes dramatized various cases investigated by the Court from its inception through "the present". The members of the Court were portrayed by actors during the episode, but the actual members often appeared at the conclusion of the program, with one of them reflecting on the case that had just been dramatized.

The series aired October 4, 1957 – April 11, 1958, on NBC at 8 p.m. EST on Fridays. It was rebroadcast on ABC on Wednesdays from August 1959 to February 17, 1960.

The program was sponsored by the P. Lorillard Company, a cigarette manufacturer.

== Principal cast ==
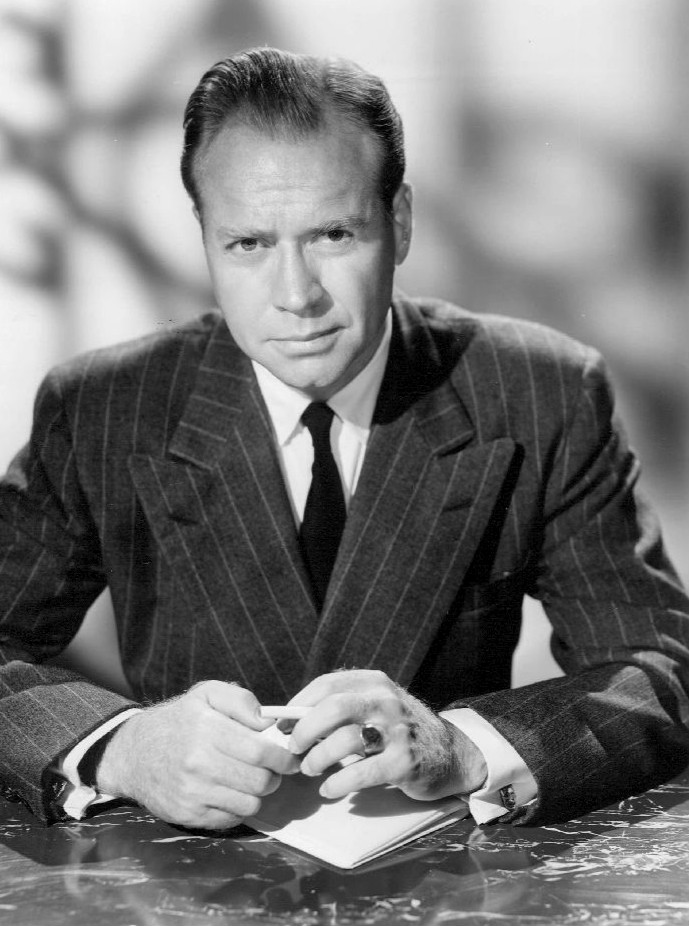
Lyle Bettger in The Court of Last Resort (1957)

- Robert H. Harris as Raymond Schindler
- Carleton Young as Harry Steeger
- S. John Launer as Marshall Houts
- John Maxwell as Alex Gregory
- Robert Anderson as Park Street Jr.
- Lyle Bettger as Sam Larsen
- Paul Birch as Erle Stanley Gardner
- Charles Meredith as Dr. LeMoyne Snyder

== Episode list ==
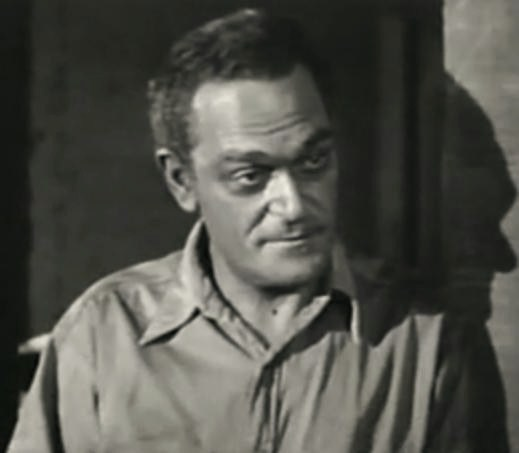
Joe De Santis in "The Mary Morales Case" (March 21, 1958)

| Episode # | Episode title | Original airdate |
|---|---|---|
| 1-1 | "The Gordon Wallace Case" (pilot) | October 4, 1957 |
| 1-2 | "The Tomas Mendoza Case" | October 11, 1957 |
| 1-3 | "The Forbes-Carroll Case" | October 18, 1957 |
| 1-4 | "The Wesley Ferguson Case" | October 25, 1957 |
| 1-5 | "The George Zaccho Case" | November 1, 1957 |
| 1-6 | "The Karl Hooft Case" | November 8, 1957 |
| 1-7 | "The Conrad Murray Case" | November 15, 1957 |
| 1-8 | "The Darlene Fitzgerald Case" | November 22, 1957 |
| 1-9 | "The James Dawson Case" | November 29, 1957 |
| 1-10 | "The Clarence Redding Case" | December 6, 1957 |
| 1-11 | "The Jim Thomson Case" | December 13, 1957 |
| 1-12 | "The John Smith Case" | December 20, 1957 |
| 1-13 | "The Westover Case" | January 3, 1958 |
| 1-14 | "The Arnold McHugh Case" | January 10, 1958 |
| 1-15 | "The Steve Hrdlika Case" | January 24, 1958 |
| 1-16 | "The Phillip Huston Case" | January 31, 1958 |
| 1-17 | "The Peter Stevens Case" | February 7, 1958 |
| 1-18 | "The Lester Arnold Case" | February 14, 1958 |
| 1-19 | "The Frank Clark Case" | February 21, 1958 |
| 1-20 | "The Jacob Loveless Case" | February 28, 1958 |
| 1-21 | "The Joe Credo Case" | March 7, 1958 |
| 1-22 | "The Stephen Lowell Case" | March 14, 1958 |
| 1-23 | "The Mary Morales Case" | March 21, 1958 |
| 1-24 | "The Joel Sheldon Case" | March 28, 1958 |
| 1-25 | "The Todd-Loomis Case" | April 4, 1958 |
| 1-26 | "The Allen Cutler Case" | April 11, 1958 |

== Production ==
Elliott Lewis was the producer, John M. Lucas was the director, and Leonard Heideman was the writer.

== Critical response ==
A review of the premiere episode in the trade publication Variety called The Court of Last Resort "a potential winner". The review said, "Story and action were handled with care, discipline, and with an aura of public service devoid of the violence and pyrotechnics usually associated with such police dramas." It also singled out Bettger's "especially effective" portrayal of Larsen.
