= Walter Brennan =

American actor (1894–1974)

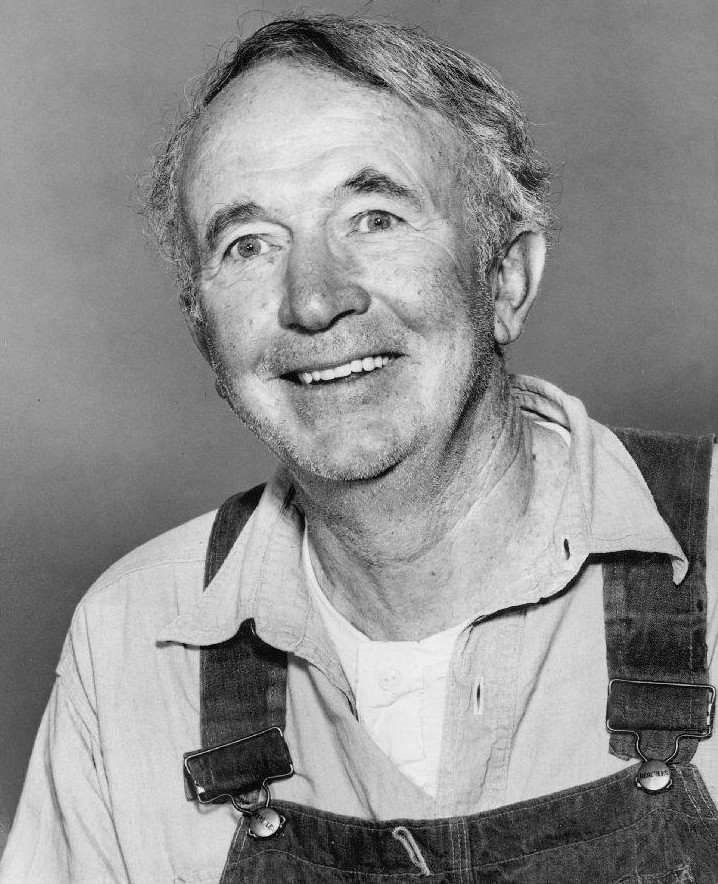
- Brennan in The Real McCoys (1958)
- Born: Walter Andrew Brennan; July 25, 1894; Lynn, Massachusetts, U.S.
- Died: September 21, 1974 (aged 80); Oxnard, California, U.S.
- Resting place: San Fernando Mission Cemetery, Los Angeles, U.S.
- Occupations: Actor; singer
- Years active: 1925–1972
- Known for: Come and Get It (1936); Kentucky (1938); The Westerner (1940); Sergeant York (1941)
- Political party: Republican; American Independent Party (1968, 1972)
- Spouse: Ruth Wells (m. 1920)
- Children: 3
- Awards: Three Academy Awards

Walter Andrew Brennan (July 25, 1894 – September 21, 1974) was an American actor and singer. He won the Academy Award for Best Supporting Actor for Come and Get It (1936), Kentucky (1938) and The Westerner (1940), making him the only person to win three awards in the supporting actor category. Brennan was also nominated for his performance in Sergeant York (1941). Other noteworthy performances were in To Have and Have Not (1944), My Darling Clementine (1946), Red River (1948) and Rio Bravo (1959). On television, he starred in the sitcom The Real McCoys (1957–1963).

== Early life ==
Brennan was born in Lynn, Massachusetts, on July 25, 1894, less than two miles from his family's home in Swampscott. His parents were both Irish immigrants. His father was an engineer and inventor, and young Brennan also studied engineering at Rindge Technical High School in Cambridge, Massachusetts.

While working as a bank clerk, he enlisted in the U.S. Army and served as a private with the 101st Field Artillery Regiment in France for two years during World War I. "While there, he suffered an injury to his vocal cords from exposure to mustard gas that left him with his screen trademark: a distinctively reedy, high-pitched voice that became a favorite for celebrity impersonators for decades."

After the war, he worked as a financial reporter for a newspaper in Boston. During the early 1920s, he made a fortune in the real estate market, but lost most of his money during a real estate slump.

== Career ==
=== Early work ===
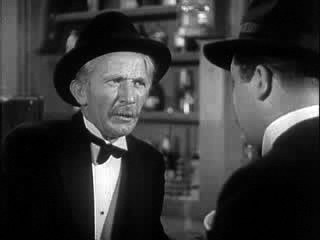
Brennan in Affairs of Cappy Ricks (1937)

Finding himself penniless, Brennan began taking parts as an extra in films at Universal Studios in 1925, starting at $7.50 a day, equal to $138 today. He wound up working at Universal off and on for the next ten years.

His early appearances included Webs of Steel (1925), Lorraine of the Lions (1925) and The Calgary Stampede (1925), a Hoot Gibson Western. Brennan was also in Watch Your Wife (1926), The Ice Flood (1926), Spangles (1926), The Collegians (1926, a short), Flashing Oars (1926, a short), Sensation Seekers (1927), Tearin' Into Trouble (1927), The Ridin' Rowdy (1927), Alias the Deacon (1927), Blake of Scotland Yard (1927) (a serial), Hot Heels (1927), Painting the Town (1928) and The Ballyhoo Buster (1928). The latter was directed by Richard Thorpe who would use Brennan as an extra several times on films.

Brennan had minor roles in The Racket (1928) from Howard Hughes, The Michigan Kid (1928), Silks and Saddles (1929), The Cohens and the Kellys in Atlantic City (1929) and Smilin' Guns (1929) and The Lariat Kid (1929) with Gibson. He also worked as a stand in.

Brennan was in His Lucky Day (1929), Frank Capra's Flight (1929), One Hysterical Night (1929) (a bigger role), The Last Performance (1929), The Long Long Trail (1929) with Gibson and The Shannons of Broadway (1929).

Other Brennan appearances included Dames Ahoy! (1930), Captain of the Guard (1930), King of Jazz (1930) (Brennan said he played nine parts but when he saw the film "I sneezed and I missed myself"), The Little Accident (1930), Parlez Vous (1930), (a short), See America Thirst (1930) with Harry Langdon and Slim Summerville and Ooh La-La (1930), (another short).

The following year Brennan had more small roles in Hello Russia (1931, a short with Slim Summerville), Many a Slip (1931) with Summerville, Heroes of the Flames (1931) a serial with Tim McCoy, Honeymoon Lane (1931), Dancing Dynamite (1931), Grief Street (1931) directed by Richard Thorpe and Is There Justice? (1931).

Brennan had a bigger role in Neck and Neck (1931), directed by Richard Thorpe. His parts tended to remain small, however: A House Divided (1931) for director William Wyler, Scratch-As-Catch-Can (1931, a Bobby Clark short directed by Mark Sandrich), and Texas Cyclone (1931, a Tim McCoy Western featuring a young John Wayne).

In 1932 Brennan was in Law and Order (1932) with Walter Huston, The Impatient Maiden (1932) for James Whale, The Airmail Mystery (1932, a serial) and Scandal for Sale (1932). He did another with John Wayne, Two-Fisted Law (1932) though the star was Tim McCoy.

Brennan was in Hello Trouble (1932) with Buck Jones, Speed Madness (1932), Miss Pinkerton (1932) with Joan Bennett, Cornered (1932) with McCoy, The Iceman's Ball (1932, another short for Sandrich), Fighting for Justice (1932) with McCoy, The Fourth Horseman (1932) with Tom Mix, The All American (1932), Once in a Lifetime (1932), Strange Justice (1932), Women Won't Tell (1932) for Richard Thorpe, Afraid to Talk (1932) and Manhattan Tower (1932).

Brennan was in Sensation Hunters (1933) for Charles Vidor, Man of Action (1933) with McCoy, Parachute Jumper (1933), Goldie Gets Along (1933), Girl Missing (1933), Rustlers' Roundup (1933) with Mix, The Cohens and Kellys in Trouble (1933) for director George Stevens, Lucky Dog (1933) and The Big Cage (1933). His scenes in William Wellman's Lilly Turner (1933) were deleted.

Brennan did another serial, The Phantom of the Air (1933), then Strange People (1933) for Thorpe, Meet the Champ (1933, a short), Sing Sinner Sing (1933), One Year Later (1933), Sailors Beware! (1933, a short), Golden Harvest (1933), Ladies Must Love (1933), Saturday's Millions (1933), Curtain at Eight (1933) and My Woman (1933).

James Whale gave him a bit part in The Invisible Man (1933) and he could be seen in King for a Night (1933), Fugitive Lovers (1933), Cross Country Cruise (1934), Beloved (1934), You Can't Buy Everything (1934), Paradise Valley (1934), Radio Dough (1934, a short), The Poor Rich (1934), The Crosby Murder Case (1934), George White's Scandals (1934), Good Girl (1934), Riptide (1934), Uncertain Lady (1934), I'll Tell the World (1934) and Fishing for Trouble (1934, a short).

Brennan was in the Three Stooges short Woman Haters (1934), then did Half a Sinner (1934), The Life of Vergie Winters (1934), Murder on the Runaway Train (1934), Whom the Gods Destroy (1934), Gentlemen of Polish (1934, a short), Death on the Diamond (1934), Great Expectations (1934), Luck of the Game (1934), Tailspin Tommy (1934, a serial), There's Always Tomorrow (1934) and Cheating Cheaters (1934).

Brennan was back with McCoy for The Prescott Kid (1934) and could be seen in The Painted Veil (1934), Biography of a Bachelor Girl (1935), Helldorado (1935), Brick-a-Brac (1935) an Edgar Kennedy short, Northern Frontier (1935), The Mystery of Edwin Drood (1935) and Law Beyond the Range (1935) with McCoy. He also had a brief uncredited role in Bride of Frankenstein (1935) starring Boris Karloff as Frankenstein's monster.

Around this time, Brennan received what he later described as "the luckiest break in the world." He was acting in a fight scene when an actor kicked him in the face and knocked out all of his teeth. As a result, Brennan wore false teeth. He said, "I looked all right off the set, but when necessary I could take 'em out and suddenly look about 40 years older."

Brennan appeared in another Three Stooges short, Restless Knights (1935) , and a short titled Hunger Pains (1935).

=== Work at MGM ===
A break for Brennan came when he was cast in The Wedding Night (1935), produced by Sam Goldwyn, alongside Gary Cooper (it was actually their second film together). He was only an extra, but his part was expanded during filming and it resulted in Brennan's getting a contract with Goldwyn.

Goldwyn mostly loaned out Brennan's services to other studios. MGM put him in West Point of the Air (1935). He was reunited with Whale in Bride of Frankenstein (1935), in which he had a brief speaking part and also worked as a stuntman.

Brennan's parts remained small in Party Wire (1935), Spring Tonic (1935), The Gay Lady (1935), Man on the Flying Trapeze (1935) and Welcome Home (1935). He did a short, The Perfect Tribute (1935) and was in George Stevens' Alice Adams (1935), but his scenes were deleted.

He could be seen in We're in the Money (1935) and She Couldn't Take It (1935).

=== Move to supporting actor ===
Brennan finally earned significant roles with a decent part in Goldwyn's Barbary Coast (1935), directed by Howard Hawks and an uncredited William Wyler. "That really set me up", Brennan said later.

He followed with small appearances in Metropolitan (1935) and Seven Keys to Baldpate (1935).

He had one of the leads in Three Godfathers (1936) playing one of the title outlaws.

He had a small role in These Three (1936) with Wyler and a larger one in Walter Wanger's The Moon's Our Home (1936) and Fury (1936), directed by Fritz Lang.

=== First Oscar: Come and Get It (1936) ===
Brennan's breakthrough part came when cast by Howard Hawks as Swan Bostrom in the period film Come and Get It (1936), playing the sidekick of Edward Arnold who eventually marries the girl Arnold abandons (played by Frances Farmer). Producer Sam Goldwyn fired Hawks during filming and replaced him with William Wyler. Brennan's performance earned him the first Academy Award for Best Supporting Actor.

Brennan followed it with support parts in Banjo on My Knee (1936) at Fox, She's Dangerous (1937), and When Love Is Young (1937). Goldwyn announced him for a role in The Real Glory in 1936, but he ended up not appearing in the final film.

Brennan had his first lead role in Affairs of Cappy Ricks (1937) at Republic Pictures. He followed it with the co-starring part in Fox's Wild and Woolly (1937), billed second after Jane Withers. He was in The Buccaneer (1938), directed by Cecil B. DeMille.

Brennan portrayed town drunk and accused murderer Muff Potter in The Adventures of Tom Sawyer (1938).

Brennan followed it with The Texans (1938), Mother Carey's Chickens (1938) and Goldwyn's The Cowboy and the Lady (1938) with Gary Cooper – the first time Brennan played Cooper's sidekick.

=== Second Oscar: Kentucky (1938) ===
Brennan won his second Best Supporting Oscar for Kentucky (1938), a horse racing film from 20th Century Fox with Loretta Young.

He supported Fred Astaire and Ginger Rogers in The Story of Vernon and Irene Castle (1939). Brennan also appeared in Melody of Youth (1939), and Stanley and Livingstone (1939) at Fox. At MGM he was in Joe and Ethel Turp Call on the President (1939).

Throughout his career, Brennan was frequently called upon to play characters considerably older than he was. The loss of many teeth in the 1932 accident, rapidly thinning hair, thin build, and unusual vocal intonations all made him seem older than he was. He used these features to great effect. In many of his film roles, Brennan wore dentures; in MGM's Northwest Passage (1940) – a film set in the late 18th century – he wore a dental prosthesis which made him appear to have rotting and broken teeth. Brennan was billed third in Northwest Passage after Spencer Tracy and Robert Young.

Zanuck at Fox announced he wanted to make The Man from Home, once a vehicle for Will Rogers, with Brennan. Instead Brennan was top-billed in Fox's Maryland (1940), an attempt to repeat the success of Kentucky. Brennan said he had been working constantly since Christmas 1937. "I'm just plain punch drunk", he said.

=== Third Oscar: The Westerner (1940) ===
Brennan had one of his best roles in Goldwyn's The Westerner (1940), playing the villainous Judge Roy Bean opposite Gary Cooper. William Wyler directed and the film earned Brennan his third Best Supporting Actor Oscar within a five-year span.

Goldwyn bought Trading Post as a vehicle for Brennan, but the film never materialized.

Brennan next supported Deanna Durbin in Nice Girl? (1941) and then Cooper again in Frank Capra's Meet John Doe (1941) and Hawks' Sergeant York (1941), a role that earned Brennan a fourth Oscar nomination. He could also be seen in This Woman is Mine (1941) as a sea captain.

Brennan played the top-billed lead in Swamp Water (1941), the first American film by director Jean Renoir. He appeared in Rise and Shine (1941) and then played reporter Sam Blake in Pride of the Yankees (1942).

Brennan appeared in the war films Stand By for Action (1942) and Hangmen Also Die! (1943), in which he played a Czech professor. He also appeared in Slightly Dangerous (1943), The Last Will and Testament of Tom Smith (1943) and Goldwyn's Russian war epic The North Star (1943).

He was top-billed in a follow-up to Kentucky and Maryland at Fox, Home in Indiana (1944).

Brennan was particularly skilled in playing the sidekick of the protagonist or the "grumpy old man" in films such as Hawks' To Have and Have Not (1944).

Brennan was a comic pirate in the Bob Hope film The Princess and the Pirate (1944). He was teamed with John Wayne for the first time since both men had obtained stardom in Dakota (1945), directed by Joseph Kane. He supported Bette Davis in A Stolen Life (1946) and appeared in the Fox musical Centennial Summer (1946).

=== Western roles ===
Brennan returned as a villain as Old Man Clanton in John Ford's My Darling Clementine (1946), opposite Henry Fonda. He followed this with parts in Nobody Lives Forever (1946) at Warner Bros. and Republic's Driftwood (1947).

He appeared in another Americana film at Fox, Scudda Hoo! Scudda Hay! (1948), and then in one of the greatest films in his career, Red River (1948), playing John Wayne's sidekick.

After supporting Robert Mitchum in Blood on the Moon (1948), he played another kindly father role in The Green Promise (1949). Brennan was billed second to Rod Cameron in Brimstone (1949), and he supported Gary Cooper in Task Force (1949).

Brennan focused on Westerns: Singing Guns (1950), A Ticket to Tomahawk (1950), Curtain Call at Cactus Creek (1950), The Showdown (1950), Surrender (1950), Along the Great Divide (1951), Best of the Badmen (1951) and Return of the Texan (1952).

He appeared in the war films The Wild Blue Yonder (1951) and Lure of the Wilderness (1952), a remake of Swamp Water in which he reprised his role, although with less screen time than in the original film.

Brennan was in Sea of Lost Ships (1953) with John Derek, Drums Across the River (1954) with Audie Murphy, The Far Country (1954) with James Stewart and Four Guns to the Border (1954) with Rory Calhoun. He also appeared in Bad Day at Black Rock (1955) for MGM.

== Later work ==
=== Television ===
Brennan began to work on television, guest-starring on episodes of Screen Directors Playhouse, Lux Video Theatre, Schlitz Playhouse, Ethel Barrymore Theater, Cavalcade of America and The Ford Television Theatre. He played the old outlaw Joe in the 1956 episode "Vengeance Canyon" of Dick Powell's Zane Grey Theatre.

He appeared as himself as a musical judge in the 1953–1954 ABC series Jukebox Jury. Brennan later said that he preferred television to films because there were not "long layoffs between jobs."

He continued to appear in movies such as Gunpoint! (1955) and The Proud Ones (1956) and was in a short film about Israel, Man on a Bus (1955).

Brennan appeared in films such as Glory (1956), Come Next Spring (1956) and Batjac's Good-bye My Lady (1956) with 14-year-old Brandon deWilde, with whom he recorded The Stories of Mark Twain that same year.

He appeared in The Way to the Gold (1957) and played Debbie Reynolds' grandfather in the romantic comedy Tammy and the Bachelor (1957).

Brennan was given another lead role in God Is My Partner (1957), a low-budget film that became a surprise hit.

==== The Real McCoys ====
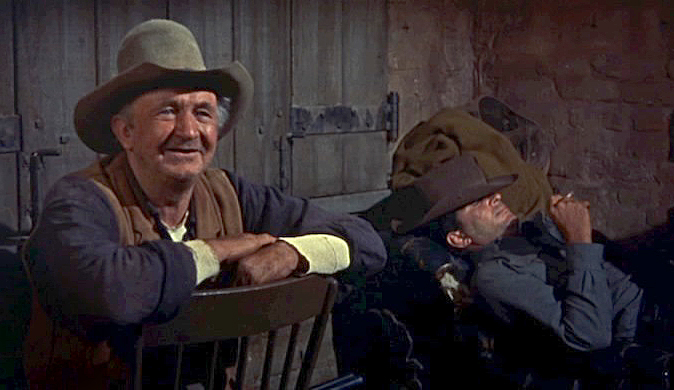
Brennan in Rio Bravo (1959)

Brennan had resisted overtures to star in a regular TV series but relented for The Real McCoys, a sitcom about a poor West Virginia family that relocated to a farm in Southern California. It was a hit and ran from 1957 to 1963.

Brennan continued to appear in films and other TV shows during the series' run such as Colgate Theatre and another Howard Hawks picture, Rio Bravo (1959), supporting John Wayne and Dean Martin.

After five years on ABC, The Real McCoys switched to CBS for a final season. Brennan joined with series creator Irving Pincus to form Brennan-Westgate Productions. The series was coproduced with Danny Thomas's Marterto Productions. It also featured Richard Crenna, Kathleen Nolan, Lydia Reed and Michael Winkelman.

For Brennan Productions, Brennan starred in Shoot Out at Big Sag (1962). He appeared as a villainous river pirate in MGM's epic How the West Was Won (1963).

=== Singing career ===
Following Brennan's success with The Real McCoys, he performed on several recordings. The most popular of these was "Old Rivers", a song about an old farmer and his mule. It was released as a single in 1962 by Liberty Records with "The Epic Ride of John H. Glenn" on the flip side. "Old Rivers" peaked at #5 on the U.S. Billboard chart, making the 67 year-old Brennan the oldest living person to have a Top 40 hit at the time. The album Old Rivers peaked at No. 54 nationally. At age 68, Brennan reached the Top 40 again, this time with "Mama Sang a Song" on November 17, 1962.

After The Real McCoys ended, Brennan provided the voice for a cartoon of The Shooting of Dan McGrew.

=== Other TV roles and Disney ===
Brennan starred as the wealthy executive Walter Andrews in the short-lived 1964–1965 ABC series The Tycoon, with Van Williams.

Brennan had a support part in Those Calloways (1965), his first Disney film, again paired with Brandon deWilde. He had a small role in The Oscar (1966).

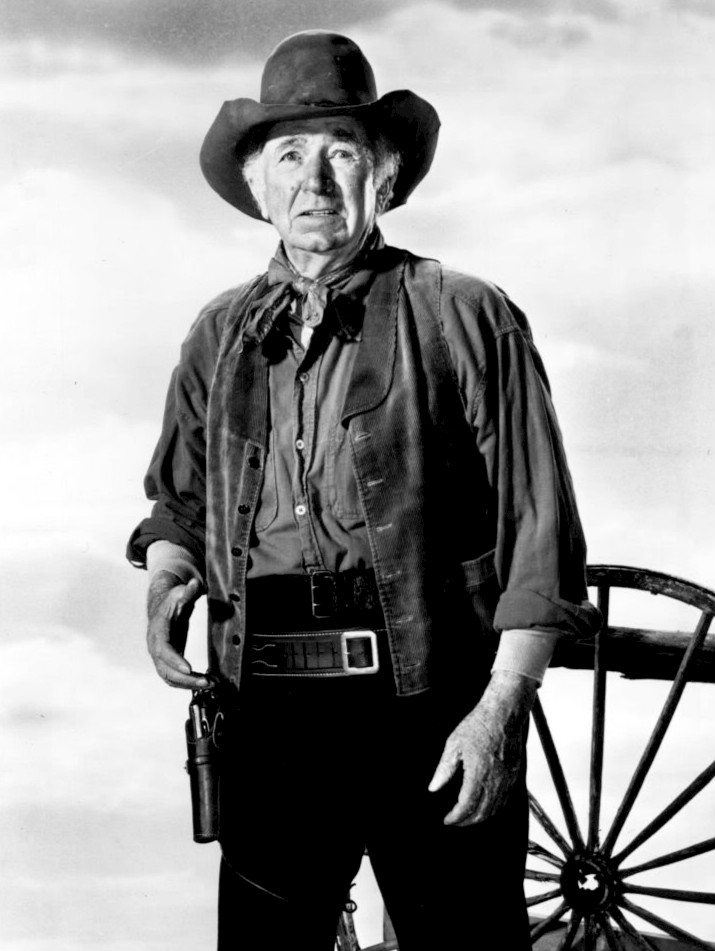
Walter Brennan in The Guns of Will Sonnett (1967)

In 1967, he starred in another ABC series, The Guns of Will Sonnett (1967–1969), as an older man in search of his gunfighter son. It ran for two seasons.

Brennan was top-billed in Disney's The Gnome-Mobile (1967) and made a pilot for the TV series Horatio Alger Jones, which did not become a series.

After a support role in Who's Minding the Mint? (1967), he returned to Disney for The One and Only, Genuine, Original Family Band (1968).

Brennan had a part as the villain in Support Your Local Sheriff! (1969) with James Garner.

=== Later career ===
Brennan received top billing over Pat O'Brien in the TV movie The Over-the-Hill Gang (1969) and Fred Astaire in The Over-the-Hill Gang Rides Again (1970).,

He joined the second season of the CBS sitcom To Rome with Love (1969–1971) with John Forsythe. This was Brennan's last television series as a member of the permanent cast, although he did make a number of appearances on Alias Smith and Jones.

Around this time he also starred in the TV movies The Young Country (1970), Two for the Money (1972) and Home for the Holidays (1972). He was announced for a Western that was not made, One Day in Eden.

He started filming Herbie Rides Again (1973) for Disney but fell ill and was replaced.

Brennan's last screen appearance was in the Western Smoke in the Wind (1975), directed by Joseph Kane.

== Personal life ==
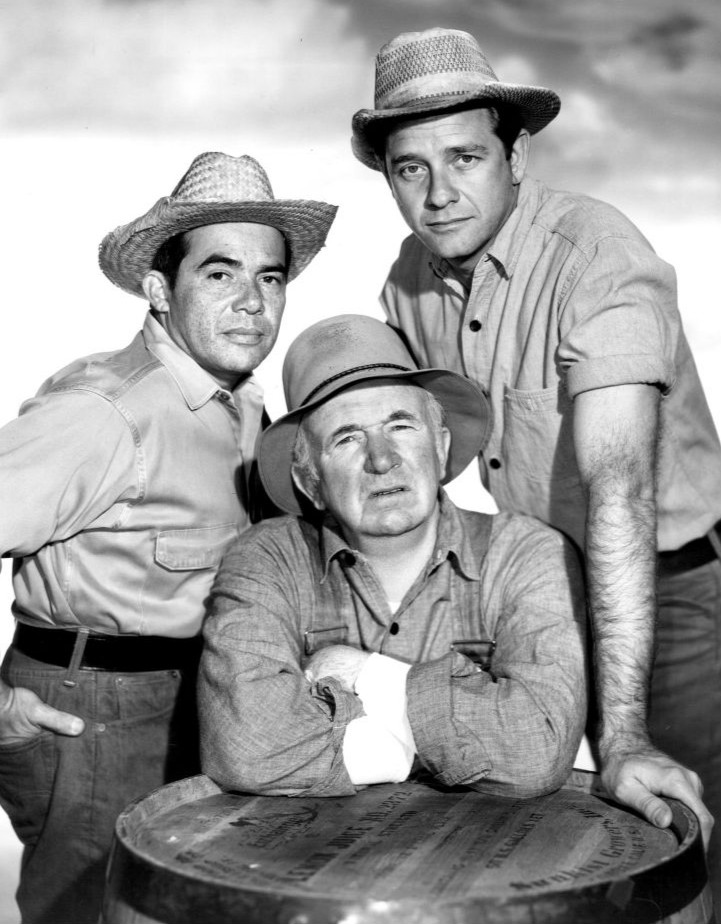
The Real McCoys (1962), L-R: Tony Martínez, Walter Brennan, Richard Crenna

In 1920, Brennan married Ruth Caroline Wells. They had three children in their 54-year marriage: Arthur, Walter, and Ruth.

In 1940, Brennan purchased the 12,000-acre Lightning Creek Ranch, 20 miles north of Joseph, Oregon. He built the Indian Lodge Motel, a movie theater, and a variety store in Joseph, and continued retreating to the ranch between film roles until his death. Some members of his family continue to live in the area.

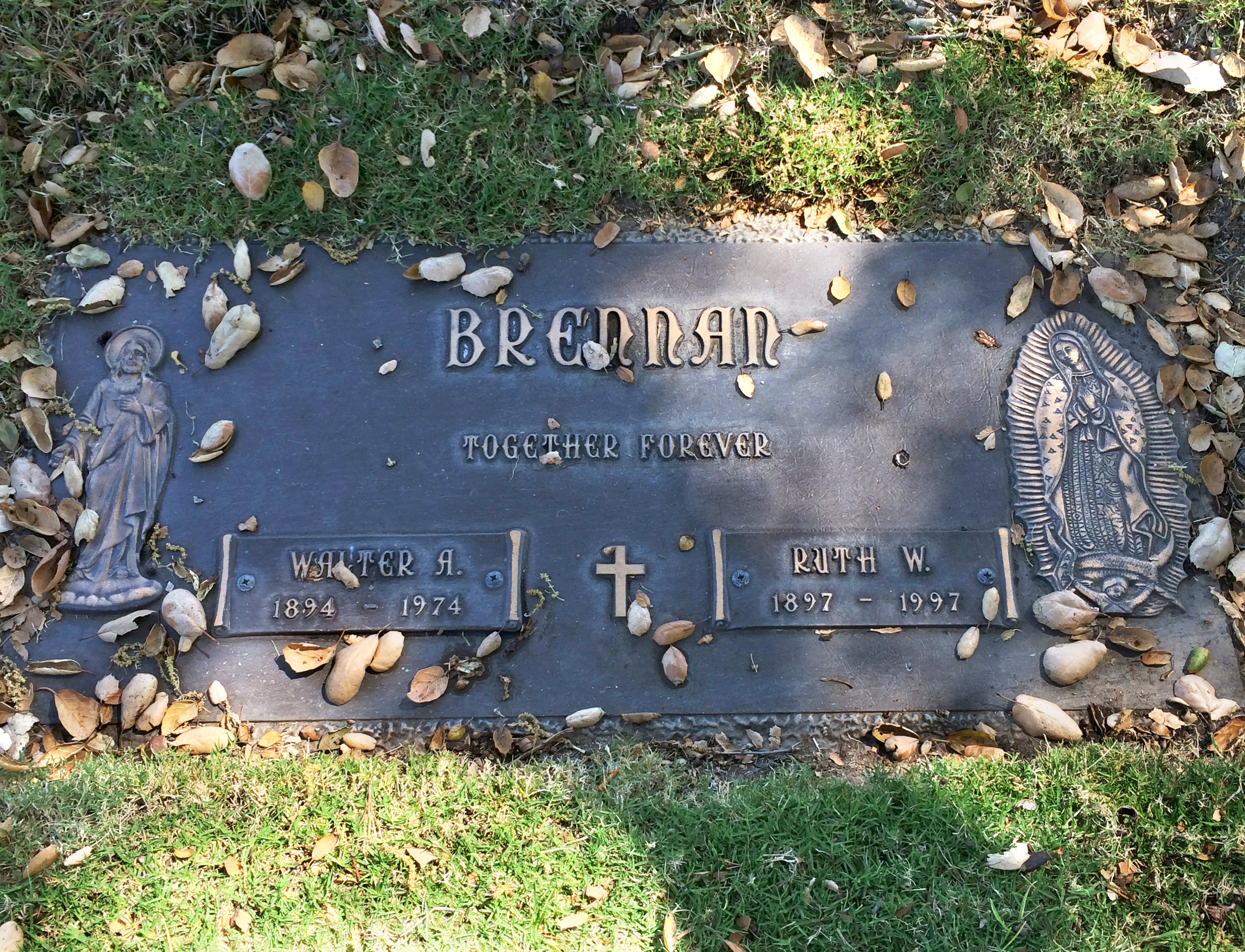
Brennan's grave at San Fernando Mission Cemetery

=== Religious and political views ===
Brennan, a Roman Catholic, did not publicize his own religious affiliation, but declared in 1964, "I'm too old not to be a religious fella... It appears we are losing something a lot of people made a lot of sacrifices for." That year, Brennan spoke at Project Prayer, a rally attended by 2,500 at the Shrine Auditorium in Los Angeles. The gathering, hosted by Anthony Eisley, sought to flood Congress with letters in support of school prayer following two decisions by the Supreme Court in 1962 and 1963 that had invalidated the practice of mandatory prayer in public schools, which the court ruled to have conflicted with the Establishment Clause of the First Amendment to the United States Constitution.

According to his biographer Carl Rollyson, Brennan was fiercely opposed to communism and reportedly branded people as communists if they supported John F. Kennedy. Rollyson wrote that Brennan "thought that the Watts riots could have been stopped 'with a machine gun'." Rollyson also reported that Brennan's home "included a bunker stocked with weapons and food in anticipation of a Soviet invasion." Brennan reportedly expressed satisfaction at the murder of the Rev. Martin Luther King Jr., much to the shock of the cast and crew of The Guns of Will Sonnett, and also rejoiced in the assassination of Robert F. Kennedy. Everett Greenbaum, who wrote 32 episodes of The Real McCoys, described Brennan as a bigot who frequently uttered racist remarks.

A staunch conservative Republican and a member of the Motion Picture Alliance for the Preservation of American Ideals, Brennan supported Barry Goldwater in the 1964 United States presidential election because Goldwater had voted against the Civil Rights Act of 1964, but Brennan later endorsed George Wallace in 1968, believing that Richard Nixon was too liberal for a Republican. In 1972, Brennan endorsed far-right candidate John Schmitz, who like Brennan, was a member of the John Birch Society. Brennan served as finance chairman and narrated advertisements in support of Schmitz's campaign. Brennan also endorsed Ronald Reagan in the 1966 California gubernatorial election and in his reelection in 1970.

=== Death ===
Brennan spent his last years mostly in retirement at his ranch in Moorpark in Ventura County, California. He died of emphysema on September 21, 1974, at the age of 80 in Oxnard, California. He was remembered by The New York Times as "Veteran actor Walter Brennan, who won three Academy Awards." His remains were interred at San Fernando Mission Cemetery in Los Angeles.

== Legacy ==
Brennan was one of the greatest character actors in motion picture history. While the roles that he played were diverse, he may be best remembered for his portrayals in Western films such as those of Judge Roy Bean in The Westerner, trail hand Nadine Groot in Red River and Deputy Stumpy in Rio Bravo. He was the first actor to win three Academy Awards and remains the only person to have won the Best Supporting Actor award three times. However, he remained somewhat embarrassed about how he had won the awards; in the early years of the Academy Awards, extras could vote, and Brennan was popular with the extras' union. His third win prompted the disenfranchisement of the union from Oscar voting. Following this change, Brennan failed to win the Oscar for his fourth Best Supporting Actor nomination in 1941 for Sergeant York. (The award went to Donald Crisp for How Green Was My Valley instead.)

Brennan played more than 230 film and television roles during a career that spanned nearly five decades. For his contributions to the film industry, he has a star on the Hollywood Walk of Fame at 6501 Hollywood Boulevard. In 1970, he was inducted into the Hall of Great Western Performers at the National Cowboy & Western Heritage Museum in Oklahoma City, where his photograph hangs prominently.

== Filmography ==
=== Film ===
Year	Title	Role	Notes
1925	Webs of Steel	Performer	uncredited
1925	Lorraine of the Lions	Minor role	uncredited
1925	The Calgary Stampede	Racing spectator	uncredited
1926	Watch Your Wife	Performer	
1926	The Ice Flood	Lumberjack	uncredited
1926	Spangles	Lunch counterman	uncredited
1927	Sensation Seekers	Below deck yacht crewman	uncredited
1927	Tearin' Into Trouble	Billy Martin	
1927	The Ridin' Rowdy	Performer	
1927	Alias the Deacon	Cashier at Cunningham's Rink	uncredited
1927	Blake of Scotland Yard	Henchman	uncredited
1927	Hot Heels	Pool hall inhabitant	uncredited
1928	The Ballyhoo Buster	Performer	
1928	The Michigan Kid	Minor role	uncredited
1928	The Racket	Man in front of barber shop	uncredited
1929	Silks and Saddles	Undetermined role	uncredited
1929	The Cohens and Kellys in Atlantic City	Man at police station	uncredited
1929	Smilin' Guns	Ranch Foreman	
1929	The Lariat Kid	Pat O'Shea	
1929	His Lucky Day	Roadhouse hhug	uncredited
1929	Flight	Marine pilot	uncredited
1929	One Hysterical Night	Paul Revere	
1929	The Last Performance	Clown	uncredited
1929	The Long Long Trail	Skinny Rawlins	
1929	The Shannons of Broadway	Hez	
1930	Dames Ahoy!	Side show barker	uncredited
1930	Captain of the Guard	Peasant	uncredited
1930	King of Jazz	Various roles	
1930	The Little Accident	Milkman	uncredited
1930	See America Thirst	Spumoni bodyguard	uncredited
1930	Many a Slip	Minor role	uncredited
1931	Honeymoon Lane	Driver	
1931	Heroes of the Flames	Bit Part	[Ch. 12] – uncredited
1931	Dancing Dynamite	Henchman	
1931	Grief Street	Walt	
1931	Is There Justice?	Rollins	
1931	Neck and Neck	Hector	
1931	Scratch-As-Catch-Can	Performer	Short film
	A House Divided	Musician	uncredited
1932	Horse Feathers	Football commentator	uncredited
1932	Texas Cyclone	Sheriff Lew Collins	
1932	Law and Order	Lanky Smith	uncredited
1932	The Impatient Maiden	Cigar stand proprietor	uncredited
1932	The Airmail Mystery	Holly	
1932	Scandal for Sale	Newspaperman	uncredited
1932	Two-Fisted Law	Deputy Sheriff Bendix	
1932	Hello Trouble	A Texas Ranger	uncredited
1932	Miss Pinkerton	Police dispatcher	uncredited
1932	Speed Madness	Joe	
1932	Cornered	Court bailiff	uncredited
1932	Fighting for Justice	Cowhand Fletcher	uncredited
1932	The Fourth Horseman	Toothless town drunk	uncredited
1932	The All American	News commentator at game	uncredited
1932	Once in a Lifetime	Lighting technician	uncredited
1932	Strange Justice	Eddie – mechanic	uncredited
1932	Women Won't Tell	Dump workman	uncredited
1932	Afraid to Talk	Protester sign carrier	uncredited
1932	Manhattan Tower	Mechanic	uncredited
1933	Sensation Hunters	Stuttering waiter	
1933	Man of Action	Cashier Summers	
1933	Parachute Jumper	Counterman at Jewel Diner	uncredited
1933	Goldie Gets Along	Stuttering waiter	uncredited
1933	Girl Missing	Joe-garage attendant	uncredited
1933	Rustlers' Roundup	Walt	uncredited
1933	The Cohens and Kellys in Trouble	Bit role	uncredited
1933	Lucky Dog	Drunk #2	
1933	The Big Cage	Tickettaker	uncredited
1933	Lilly Turner	Performer	scenes deleted
1933	The Phantom of the Air	'Skid'	uncredited
1933	Strange People	The radio repairman	
1933	Sing Sinner Sing	Henchman Riordan	
1933	One Year Later	Yokel	uncredited
1933	Golden Harvest	Farmhand at wedding	uncredited
1933	Ladies Must Love	Flute player	uncredited
1933	Saturday's Millions	Reporter	uncredited
1933	Curtain at Eight	Silent detective	uncredited
1933	My Woman	Stuttering animal imitator	uncredited
1933	The Invisible Man	Bicycle owner	uncredited
1933	King for a Night	Soda Jerk	uncredited
1934	Fugitive Lovers	Second bus driver	uncredited
1934	Tailspin Tommy	Hospital Orderly	[Ch. 8] – uncredited
1934	Cross Country Cruise	Niagara Falls boatman	uncredited
1934	Beloved	Stuttering boarder	
1934	You Can't Buy Everything	Train Vendor	uncredited
1934	Paradise Valley	Farmer Hiram	
1934	The Poor Rich	Dr. Johnson the coroner	uncredited
1934	The Crosby Case	Ship's officer	uncredited
1934	George White's Scandals	Hick	uncredited
1934	Good Dame	Elmer Spicer	uncredited
1934	Riptide	Chauffeur	uncredited
1934	Uncertain Lady	Gas station attendant	uncredited
1934	I'll Tell the World	Otto – Bicycle repairman	uncredited
1934	Woman Haters	Train Conductor	uncredited Short film
1934	Half a Sinner	Radio announcer	
1934	The Life of Vergie Winters	Roscoe – a gossiper	uncredited
1934	Murder in the Private Car	Switchman	uncredited
1934	Whom the Gods Destroy	Clifford	uncredited
1934	Death on the Diamond	Hotdog vendor	uncredited
1934	Great Expectations	Prisoner on ship	uncredited
1934	Gridiron Flash	Diner Proprietor	uncredited
1934	There's Always Tomorrow	Mechanic	uncredited
1934	Cheating Cheaters	Ship's telegrapher	uncredited
1934	The Prescott Kid	Zeke (stage driver)	
	The Painted Veil	Performer	scenes deleted
1935	Biography of a Bachelor Girl	Reporter on ship	uncredited
1935	Helldorado	Pete, the Waiter	uncredited
1935	Northern Frontier	Stuttering cook	
1935	The Mystery of Edwin Drood	First gossip	uncredited
1935	Law Beyond the Range	Abner	
1935	Restless Knights	Father	uncredited Short film
1935	The Wedding Night	Bill Jenkins	
1935	West Point of the Air	Soldier at Kelly's wreckage	uncredited
1935	Bride of Frankenstein	Neighbor	uncredited
1935	Party Wire	Paul – railroad telegrapher	uncredited
1935	Spring Tonic	Bum	uncredited
1935	Lady Tubbs	Joseph	uncredited
1935	Man on the Flying Trapeze	'Legs' Garnett	
1935	Welcome Home	Walter	uncredited
1935	Alice Adams	Performer	scenes deleted
1935	We're in the Money	Wedding witness	uncredited
1935	She Couldn't Take It	Peddler	uncredited
1935	Barbary Coast	Old Atrocity	
1935	Metropolitan	Grandpa	uncredited
1935	Seven Keys to Baldpate	Station agent	
1936	Three Godfathers	Sam "Gus" Barton	
1936	These Three	Taxi driver	
1936	The Moon's Our Home	Lem	
1936	Fury	'Bugs' Meyers	
1936	Come and Get It	Swan Bostrom	
1936	Banjo on My Knee	Newt Holley	
1937	She's Dangerous	Ote O'Leary	
1937	When Love Is Young	Uncle Hugo	
1937	Affairs of Cappy Ricks	Cappy Ricks	
1937	Wild and Woolly	Gramp 'Hercules' Flynn	
1938	The Buccaneer	Ezra Peaves	
1938	The Adventures of Tom Sawyer	Muff Potter	
1938	The Texans	Chuckawalla	
1938	Mother Carey's Chickens	Mr. Ossian Popham	
1938	The Cowboy and the Lady	Sugar	
1938	Kentucky	Peter Goodwin	
1939	The Story of Vernon and Irene Castle	Walter	
1939	They Shall Have Music	Professor Lawson	
1939	Stanley and Livingstone	Jeff Slocum	
1939	Joe and Ethel Turp Call on the President	Jim	
1940	Northwest Passage	"Hunk" Marriner	
1940	Maryland	William Stewart	
1940	The Westerner	Judge Roy Bean	
1941	Nice Girl?	Hector Titus	
1941	Meet John Doe	The 'Colonel'	
1941	Sergeant York	Pastor Rosier Pile	
1941	This Woman Is Mine	Capt. Jonathan Thorne	
1941	Swamp Water	Tom Keefer	
1941	Rise and Shine	Grandpa	
1942	The Pride of the Yankees	Sam Blake	
1942	Stand By for Action	Chief Yeoman Henry Johnson	
1943	Hangmen Also Die	Prof. Stephen Novotny	
1943	Slightly Dangerous	Cornelius Burden	
1943	The North Star	Karp	
1944	Home in Indiana	J. F. "Thunder" Bolt	
1944	To Have and Have Not	Eddie	
1944	The Princess and the Pirate	Featherhead	
1945	Dakota	Capt. Bounce of the Riverbird	
1946	A Stolen Life	Eben Folger	
1946	Centennial Summer	Jesse Rogers	
1946	My Darling Clementine	Newman Haynes Clanton	
1946	Nobody Lives Forever	Pop Gruber	
1947	Driftwood	Murph	
1948	Scudda Hoo! Scudda Hay!	Tony Maule	
1948	Red River	Nadine Groot	
1948	Blood on the Moon	Kris Barden	
1949	The Green Promise	Mr. Matthews	
1949	Brimstone	Brimstone "Pop" Courteen	
1949	Task Force	Pete Richard	
1950	Singing Guns	Dr. Jonathan Mark	
1950	A Ticket to Tomahawk	Terence Sweeny	
1950	Curtain Call at Cactus Creek	Rimrock Thomas	
1950	The Showdown	Cap Mackellar	
1950	Surrender	Sheriff Bill Howard	
1951	Along the Great Divide	Timothy 'Pop' Keith	
1951	Best of the Badmen	"Doc" Butcher	
1951	The Wild Blue Yonder	Major General Wolfe	
1952	Return of the Texan	Grandpa Firth Crockett	
1952	Lure of the Wilderness	Jim Harper	
1953	Sea of Lost Ships	C.P.O. "Chief" O'Malley	
1954	Drums Across the River	Sam Brannon	
1954	Four Guns to the Border	Simon Bhumer	
1955	The Far Country	Ben Tatum	
1955	Bad Day at Black Rock	Doc Velie	
1955	At Gunpoint	Doc Lacy	
1956	Glory	Ned Otis	
1956	Come Next Spring	Jeffrey Storys	
1956	The Proud Ones	Jake	
1956	Good-bye, My Lady	Uncle Jesse Jackson	
1957	The Way to the Gold	Uncle George Williams	
1957	Tammy and the Bachelor	Grandpa	
1957	God Is My Partner	Dr. Charles Grayson	
1959	Rio Bravo	Stumpy	
1962	Shoot Out at Big Sag	"Preacher" Hawker	
1962	How the West Was Won	Col. Jeb Hawkins	
1965	Those Calloways	Alf Simes	
1966	The Oscar	Orrin C. Quentin	
1967	The Gnome-Mobile	D.J. Mulrooney/Knobby	
1967	Who's Minding the Mint?	Pop Gillis	
1968	The One and Only, Genuine, Original Family Band	Grandpa Bower	
1969	Support Your Local Sheriff!	Pa Danby	
1975	Smoke in the Wind	H. P. Kingman	final film role (posthumous release)

=== Television ===
Year	Title	Role	Notes
1953–56	Schlitz Playhouse of Stars	Simmons/Ezra Jenkins	3 episodes
1955	Screen Directors Playhouse	Grandpa	Episode: The Brush Roper
1956	Ethel Barrymore Theatre	Performer	Episode: The Gentle Years
1956	Cavalcade of America	Link Morley	Episode: Woman's Work
1956	The Ford Television Hour	Duffy	Episode: Duffy's Man
1956–57	Dick Powell's Zane Grey Theatre	Sheriff John Larson/Joe	2 episodes
1958	Colgate Theatre	Mr. Tutt	Episode: Mr. Tutt (or Strange Counsel)
1957–63	The Real McCoys	Grandpa Amos McCoy	224 episodes
1964–65	The Tycoon	Walter Andrews	32 episodes
1967–69	The Guns of Will Sonnett	Will Sonnett	50 episodes
1969–70	The Red Skelton Hour	Various Roles	3 episodes
1969	The Over-the-Hill Gang	Nash Crawford	Television film
1970	The Over-the-Hill Gang Rides Again	Nash Crawford	Television film
1970	The Young Country	Sheriff Matt Fenley	Television film
1970–71	To Rome with Love	Andy Pruitt	17 episodes
1971	Alias Smith and Jones	Silky O'Sullivan/Gantry	3 episodes
1972	Home for the Holidays	Benjamin Morgan	Television film
1972	Two for the Money	Cody Guilford	Television film

=== Radio ===
Year	Program	Episode	Co Star
1944	Lux Radio Theatre	"Home in Indiana"	w/ Charlotte Greenwood
1945	Lux Radio Theatre	"Kentucky"	w/ Laraine Day
1955	Lux Radio Theatre	"The Treasure of the Sierra Madre"	w/ Edmund O'Brien

=== Discography ===
Albums

Year	Album	US	Label
1960	Dutchman's Gold	—	Dot
1962	Old Rivers	54	Liberty
1962	Mama Sang a Song	—	Liberty
1962	'Twas the Night Before Christmas... Back Home	—	Liberty

Singles

Year	Single	Chart Positions				Album
Year	Single	US	US AC	US Country	Canada	Album
1960	"Dutchman's Gold"	30	—	—	30	Dutchman's Gold
1962	"Old Rivers"	5	2	3	18	Old Rivers
1962	"Houdini"	100	—	—	—	Mama Sang a Song
1962	"Mama Sang a Song"	38	14	—	—	Mama Sang a Song

== Awards and nominations ==
Year	Award	Category	Film	Result
1936	Academy Awards	Best Supporting Actor	Come and Get It	Won
1938	Academy Awards	Best Supporting Actor	Kentucky	Won
1940	Academy Awards	Best Supporting Actor	The Westerner	Won
1941	Academy Awards	Best Supporting Actor	Sergeant York	Nominated
1959	Primetime Emmy Awards	Outstanding Lead Actor in a Comedy Series	The Real McCoys	Nominated

== See also ==
- List of actors with Academy Award nominations
- List of superlative Academy Award winners and nominees
