= Michael Winkelman =

American film and television actor

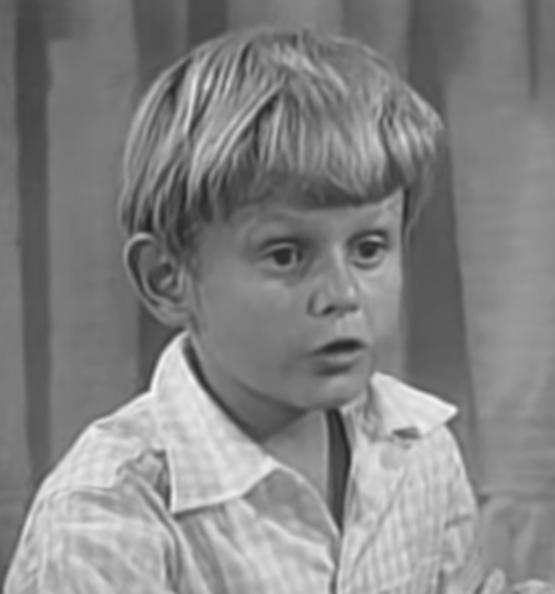
- Winkelman in Medic, 1955
- Born: Michael Lew Winkelman; June 27, 1946; Los Angeles, California, U.S.
- Died: July 27, 1999 (aged 53); Los Angeles, California, U.S.
- Occupations: Film and television actor
- Years active: 1955–1965

Michael Lew Winkelman (June 27, 1946 – July 27, 1999) was an American film and television actor. He was best known for playing Little Luke in the television sitcom series The Real McCoys.

== Life and career ==
Winkelman was born in Los Angeles, California. His mother, grandmother and great-grandmother had all been stage performers. Winkelman began his screen career in 1955, appearing in the television series The Great Gildersleeve. He then starred as Little Luke in the ABC sitcom The Real McCoys, starring along with Walter Brennan, Richard Crenna, Kathleen Nolan, Lydia Reed and Tony Martinez. While playing Little Luke, he played in the North Hollywood Little League.

After the series ended in 1963, Winkelman guest-starred in television programs including The Munsters, Wagon Train, The Joey Bishop Show, Mickey Spillane's Mike Hammer, The Danny Thomas Show, The Lone Ranger, The Millionaire, Lassie and Mr. Novak. He also appeared in films, such as The Big Knife, Bobby Ware Is Missing, Sincerely Yours, The Indian Fighter and Ride Out for Revenge.

Winkelman retired from acting in 1965, last appearing in the CBS sitcom television series The Munsters. After retiring from acting, he served in the United States Navy during the Vietnam War.

== Death ==
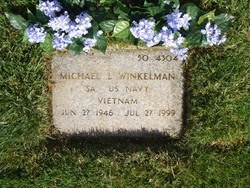
Winkelman's gravestone at Riverside National Cemetery, 2006

Winkelman died on July 27, 1999 in Los Angeles, California, at the age of 53. He was buried at Riverside National Cemetery.
