= List of The Real McCoys episodes =

The Real McCoys is an American sitcom starring Walter Brennan, Richard Crenna, and Kathleen Nolan. Co-produced by Danny Thomas's Marterto Productions in association with Walter Brennan and Irving Pincus's Westgate Company, it was broadcast for six seasons: five by the ABC-TV network, from 1957 to 1962; and a final season by CBS, 1962–1963. Set in California's San Fernando Valley, it was filmed at Desilu studios in Hollywood.==Series overview==

Season	Episodes	Originally released		Rank	Average viewership (in millions)
Season	Episodes	First released	Last released	Rank	Average viewership (in millions)
1	39	October 3, 1957	June 26, 1958	—N/a (Note: Not in top 30)	—N/a
2	39	October 2, 1958	June 25, 1959	8	13.2
3	29	July 16, 1959	March 17, 1960	11	12.9
4	39	August 4, 1960	May 25, 1961	5	13
5	39	July 27, 1961	May 10, 1962	14	11.7
6	40	September 30, 1962	June 30, 1963	—N/a	—N/a

== Season 1 (1957–58) ==
No. overall	No. in season	Title	Directed by	Written by	Original release date
1	1	"Californy, Here We Come"	Sheldon Leonard	Bill Manhoff	October 3, 1957
2	2	"The Egg War (with Charles Lane)"	Sheldon Leonard	Bill Manhoff	October 10, 1957
3	3	"Kate's Dress"	Sheldon Leonard	Jack Elinson & Charles Stewart	October 17, 1957
4	4	"Grampa Sells His Gun"	Hy Averback	Bill Manhoff & Leonard Burns	October 24, 1957
5	5	"A Question of Discipline"	Hy Averback	Jack Elinson & Charles Stewart	October 31, 1957
6	6	"You Can't Cheat an Honest Man"	Sheldon Leonard	Jack Elinson & Charles Stewart	November 7, 1957
7	7	"Luke Gets His Freedom"	Sheldon Leonard	Henry Sharp & Bill Manhoff	November 14, 1957
8	8	"Grampa's Date"	Sheldon Leonard	Bill Manhoff	November 21, 1957
9	9	"The Fishing Contest"	Hy Averback	Paul Henning & Dick Wesson	November 28, 1957
10	10	"It's a Woman's World"	Hy Averback	Story by : Irving Pincus; Teleplay by : Bill Manhoff	December 5, 1957
11	11	"The Bigger They Are"	Hy Averback	Jack Elinson & Charles Stewart	December 12, 1957
12	12	"Gambling is a Sin"	Hy Averback	Bill Davenport & Jim Fritzell	December 19, 1957
13	13	"Let's Be Buddies"	Hy Averback	Jack Elinson & Charles Stewart	December 26, 1957
14	14	"Grampa and the Driver's License"	Hy Averback	Bill Manhoff	January 2, 1958
15	15	"The Lady's Man"	Hy Averback	Bill Davenport & Jim Fritzell	January 9, 1958
16	16	"Luke's Mother-in-Law"	Hy Averback	Bill Manhoff	January 16, 1958
17	17	"The Matchmaker"	Hy Averback	Arthur Dales	January 23, 1958
18	18	"The Goodys Come to Town"	Hy Averback	Bill Manhoff & Leonard Burns	January 30, 1958
19	19	"Little Luke's Education"	Hy Averback	Bill Manhoff & Leonard Burns	February 6, 1958
20	20	"Time to Retire"	Hy Averback	Jack Elinson & Charles Stewart	February 13, 1958
21	21	"Grampa's Proposal"	Hy Averback	Jack Elinson & Charles Stewart	February 20, 1958
22	22	"The Honeymoon"	Hy Averback	Jack Elinson & Charles Stewart	February 27, 1958
23	23	"Once There Was a Traveling Saleswoman"	Hy Averback	Bill Manhoff	March 6, 1958
24	24	"My Favorite Uncle"	Hy Averback	Jack Elinson & Charles Stewart	March 13, 1958
25	25	"Grampa's Birthday"	Hy Averback	Arthur Dales	March 20, 1958
26	26	"New Doctor in Town"	Hy Averback	Bob O'Brien & Irving Elinson	March 27, 1958
27	27	"For Love or Money"	Hy Averback	Bill Manhoff	April 3, 1958
28	28	"Kate's Career"	Hy Averback	Jack Elinson & Charles Stewart & Irving Elinson	April 10, 1958
29	29	"When a Fellow Needs a Friend"	Hy Averback	David Adler & Henry Sharp	April 17, 1958
30	30	"It Pays to Be Poor"	Hy Averback	Henry Sharp & Bill Manhoff	April 24, 1958
31	31	"The Life of the Party"	Hy Averback	Charles Stewart & Jack Elinson & Irving Elinson	May 1, 1958
32	32	"Three is a Crowd"	Hy Averback	Bill Manhoff	May 8, 1958
33	33	"The New Look"	Hy Averback	William Cowley & Peggy Chantler Dick	May 15, 1958
34	34	"Volunteer Fire Department"	Hy Averback	Jack Elinson & Charles Stewart	May 22, 1958
35	35	"You Can't Always Be a Hero"	Hy Averback	Henry Sharp & David Adler	May 29, 1958
36	36	"The Homely Boy"	Hy Averback	Paul West & Irving Elinson	June 5, 1958
37	37	"Her Flaming Youth"	Hy Averback	Charles Stewart & Jack Elinson	June 12, 1958
38	38	"The Corn Eating Contest"	Hy Averback	George W. George & Judy George	June 19, 1958
39	39	"You're Never Too Old"	Hy Averback	Nate Monaster & Arthur Alsberg	June 26, 1958

== Season 2 (1958–59) ==
No. overall	No. in season	Title	Directed by	Written by	Original release date
40	1	"The New Car"	Hy Averback	Stanley Shapiro & Maurice Richlin	October 2, 1958
41	2	"Grandpa Learns About Teenagers"	Hy Averback	Jack Elinson & Charles Stewart	October 9, 1958
42	3	"Blow the House Down"	Hy Averback	John L. Greene & Phil Shuken	October 16, 1958
43	4	"The Dancin' Fool"	Hy Averback	Bill Manhoff	October 23, 1958
44	5	"The New Well"	Hy Averback	Stanley Shapiro & Maurice Richlin	October 30, 1958
45	6	"The New Dog"	Hy Averback	Bill Manhoff	November 6, 1958
46	7	"Sing for Your Supper"	Hy Averback	Jack Elinson & Charles Stewart	November 13, 1958
47	8	"Do You Kiss Your Wife?"	Hy Averback	Bill Davenport & Arthur Julian	November 20, 1958
48	9	"The Perfect Swine"	Hy Averback	Jim Fritzell & Everett Greenbaum	November 27, 1958
49	10	"Leave It to the Girls"	Hy Averback	Jack Elinson & Charles Stewart	December 4, 1958
50	11	"The Gift"	Hy Averback	John L. Greene & Phil Shuken	December 11, 1958
51	12	"The New Hired Hand"	Hy Averback	Jack Elinson & Charles Stewart	December 18, 1958
52	13	"The New Neighbors"	Hy Averback	Paul West & Irving Elinson	December 25, 1958
53	14	"Luke Gets a Job"	Hy Averback	Jack Elinson & Charles Stewart	January 1, 1959
54	15	"The McCoys Visit Hollywood"	Hy Averback	Jack Elinson & Charles Stewart	January 8, 1959
55	16	"The Bank Loan"	Hy Averback	Jim Fritzell & Everett Greenbaum	January 15, 1959
56	17	"The Great Discovery"	Hy Averback	Fred S. Fox & Maurice Richlin	January 22, 1959
57	18	"Son of the Mystic Nile"	Hy Averback	Jack Elinson & Charles Stewart	January 29, 1959
58	19	"Kate Learns to Drive"	Hy Averback	Jack Elinson & Charles Stewart	February 5, 1959
59	20	"Grampa's Private War"	Hy Averback	George W. George & Henry Sharp	February 12, 1959
60	21	"The Rainmaker"	Hy Averback	Jim Fritzell & Everett Greenbaum	February 19, 1959
61	22	"The Perfect Houseguest"	Hy Averback	Jack Elinson & Charles Stewart	February 26, 1959
62	23	"The Wedding"	Hy Averback	Bill Manhoff	March 5, 1959
63	24	"Kate's Diet"	Hy Averback	Bill Manhoff	March 12, 1959
64	25	"What's a Family For?"	Hy Averback	Jack Elinson & Charles Stewart	March 19, 1959
65	26	"Grampa Takes the Primrose Path"	Hy Averback	Jim Fritzell & Everett Greenbaum	March 26, 1959
66	27	"Batter Up!"	Hy Averback	Jack Elinson & Charles Stewart	April 2, 1959
67	28	"Sweet Fifteen"	Hy Averback	Irving Elinson & Paul West	April 9, 1959
68	29	"Go Fight City Hall"	Hy Averback	Phillip Shuken & John Greene	April 16, 1959
69	30	"Two's Company"	Hy Averback	Bob Ross	April 23, 1959
70	31	"The Tax Man Cometh"	Hy Averback	Everett Greenbaum & Jim Fritzell	April 30, 1959
71	32	"The Mrs. Homemaker Contest"	Hy Averback	Jack Elinson & Charles Stewart	May 7, 1959
72	33	"The Insurance Policy"	Hy Averback	Bob Ross	May 14, 1959
73	34	"How to Paint a House"	Hy Averback	Charles Stewart & Jack Elinson	May 21, 1959
74	35	"The Great Woodsman"	Hy Averback	Norman Paul	May 28, 1959
75	36	"The Big Skeet Shoot"	Hy Averback	Jack Elinson & Charles Stewart	June 4, 1959
76	37	"Grampa's New Job"	Hy Averback	Jim Fritzell & Everett Greenbaum	June 11, 1959
77	38	"The Actor"	Hy Averback	Bill Manhoff	June 18, 1959
78	39	"Fire When Ready, Grandpa"	Hy Averback	Story by : Frank Gabrielson; Teleplay by : Paul West	June 25, 1959

== Season 3 (1959–60) ==
No. overall	No. in season	Title	Directed by	Written by	Original release date
79	1	"The Farmer Took a Wife"	Hy Averback	Jack Elinson & Charles Stewart	July 16, 1959
80	2	"The Game Warden"	Hy Averback	Jim Fritzell & Everett Greenbaum	July 23, 1959
81	3	"The Screen Test"	Hy Averback	Jim Fritzell & Everett Greenbaum	July 30, 1959
82	4	"Work No More, My Lady"	Hy Averback	Henry Sharp	August 6, 1959
83	5	"The Garden Club"	Hy Averback	Norman Paul & Bob White	August 13, 1959
84	6	"The Weaker Sex?"	Hy Averback	Ben Gershman & Bob White	August 27, 1959
85	7	"The Fighter and the Lady"	Hy Averback	Paul Henning & Dick Wesson	September 3, 1959
86	8	"The Gas Station"	Hy Averback	Bob Ross	September 10, 1959
87	9	"Grampa Fights the Air Force"	Hy Averback	Jim Fritzell & Everett Greenbaum	September 17, 1959
88	10	"The Girls at Mom's Place"	Hy Averback	Norman Paul & Bob White	September 24, 1959
89	11	"The Politician"	Hy Averback	Jack Elinson & Charles Stewart	October 8, 1959
90	12	"Pepino Takes a Bride"	Hy Averback	Ben Gershman & Bob White	October 15, 1959
91	13	"Hot Rod"	Hy Averback	Jim Fritzell & Everett Greenbaum	October 22, 1959
92	14	"The Ghostbreakers"	Hy Averback	Henry Sharp	November 5, 1959
93	15	"The Marriage Broker"	Hy Averback	Ben Gershman & Bob White	November 12, 1959
94	16	"How to Build a Boat"	Hy Averback	Jim Fritzell & Everett Greenbaum	November 19, 1959
95	17	"The Artist"	Hy Averback	Story by : Ralph Goodman & William Danch; Teleplay by : Bob Ross	November 26, 1959
96	18	"The Perfume Salesman"	Hy Averback	Jim Fritzell & Everett Greenbaum	December 3, 1959
97	19	"The Television Set"	Hy Averback	Ben Gershman & Bob White	December 10, 1959
98	20	"The Lawsuit"	Hy Averback	Bill Manhoff	December 17, 1959
99	21	"The Town Councilman"	Hy Averback	Jim Fritzell & Everett Greenbaum	December 24, 1959
100	22	"Cousin Naomi"	Hy Averback	Story by : Irving Pincus; Teleplay by : Phil Shuken & John L. Greene	January 7, 1960
101	23	"The Bowling Champ"	Hy Averback	Ben Gershman & Bob White	January 28, 1960
102	24	"The Talk of the Town"	Hy Averback	Jim Fritzell & Everett Greenbaum	February 4, 1960
103	25	"Once There Was a Man"	Hy Averback	Fred S. Fox & Irving Elinson	February 11, 1960
104	26	"Weekend in Los Angeles"	Hy Averback	Jim Fritzell & Everett Greenbaum	February 18, 1960
105	27	"First Date"	Hy Averback	Irving Elinson & Paul West	March 3, 1960
106	28	"How to Discover Oil"	Hy Averback	Arthur Stander & David Adler	March 10, 1960
107	29	"A House Divided"	Hy Averback	Jack Elinson & Charles Stewart	March 17, 1960

== Season 4 (1960–61) ==
No. overall	No. in season	Title	Directed by	Written by	Original release date
108	1	"Foreman of the Jury"	James V. Kern	Jim Fritzell & Everett Greenbaum	August 4, 1960
109	2	"One for the Money"	David Alexander	Story by : Irving Pincus; Teleplay by : John L. Greene & Phil Shuken	August 11, 1960
110	3	"That Was No Lady"	David Alexander	Bob Ross	August 18, 1960
111	4	"The Tycoon"	David Alexander	Jim Fritzell & Everett Greenbaum	August 25, 1960
112	5	"Where There's a Will"	David Alexander	Bob Ross	September 1, 1960
113	6	"The Jinx"	David Alexander	John L. Greene & Phil Shuken	September 8, 1960
114	7	"The Delegates"	David Alexander	Ben Gershman & Bob White	September 15, 1960
115	8	"The Gigolo"	Charles Barton	Story by : Irving Pincus; Teleplay by : John L. Greene & Phil Shuken	September 22, 1960
116	9	"Teenage Wedding"	Charles Barton	Jim Fritzell & Everett Greenbaum	September 29, 1960
117	10	"McCoys, Ahoy"	Charles Barton	Jim Fritzell & Everett Greenbaum	October 6, 1960
118	11	"Beware a Smart Woman"	Charles Barton	Phil Shuken & John L. Greene	October 13, 1960
119	12	"Executive Wife"	David Alexander	Story by : Arnold Horwitt & Michael L. Morris; Teleplay by : Jim Fritzell & Everett Greenbaum	October 20, 1960
120	13	"Pepino McCoy"	David Alexander	Story by : Irving Pincus; Teleplay by : John L. Greene & Phil Shuken	October 27, 1960
121	14	"Father and Son Day"	David Alexander	Ben Gershman & Bob White	November 10, 1960
122	15	"Farmer or Scientist"	David Alexander	Jim Fritzell & Everett Greenbaum	November 17, 1960
123	16	"The New Librarian"	David Alexander	Budd Grossman	November 24, 1960
124	17	"Smothered in Love"	Charles Barton	Harry Winkler & Elon Packard	December 1, 1960
125	18	"Baldy"	Charles Barton	Jim Fritzell & Everett Greenbaum	December 8, 1960
126	19	"The Hermit"	Charles Barton	Danny Arnold	December 15, 1960
127	20	"The Legacy"	Charles Barton	Phil Shuken & John L. Greene	December 22, 1960
128	21	"A Bundle from Japan"	Charles Barton	Jim Fritzell & Everett Greenbaum	January 12, 1961
129	22	"The Horse Expert"	Charles Barton	Story by : Helen Diller & Andy Brennan; Teleplay by : Jim Fritzell & Everett Greenbaum	January 19, 1961
130	23	"The City Boy"	David Alexander	David Adler & Leo Rifkin	January 26, 1961
131	24	"The Investors"	David Alexander	Jim Fritzell & Everett Greenbaum	February 2, 1961
132	25	"If You Can't Lick 'Em"	David Alexander	John L. Greene & Phil Shuken	February 9, 1961
133	26	"The Rival"	David Alexander	Jim Fritzell & William Davenport & Bob Ross	February 16, 1961
134	27	"The Good Neighbor Policy"	David Alexander	John L. Greene & Phil Shuken	February 23, 1961
135	28	"You Can't Beat the Army"	David Alexander	Harvey Bullock	March 2, 1961
136	29	"The Bazaar"	David Alexander	Harry Winkler & Elon Packard	March 9, 1961
137	30	"The Swedish Girl"	David Alexander	Jim Fritzell & Everett Greenbaum	March 16, 1961
138	31	"The New Sunday School Teacher"	Richard Crenna	Harvey Bullock	March 23, 1961
139	32	"Baseball vs. Love"	Richard Crenna	Jim Fritzell & Everett Greenbaum	March 30, 1961
140	33	"Theater in the Barn"	Lawrence Dobkin	Story by : Arthur Marx & Mannie Manheim; Teleplay by : Bob Ross	April 6, 1961
141	34	"George Retires"	Lawrence Dobkin	Jim Fritzell & Everett Greenbaum	April 13, 1961
142	35	"Pepino's Wedding"	David Alexander	Story by : John L. Greene & Phil Shuken; Teleplay by : Bob Ross	April 27, 1961
143	36	"Sorority Girl"	David Alexander	William Raynor & Myles Wilder	May 4, 1961
144	37	"Kate Comes Home"	David Alexander	Jim Fritzell & Everett Greenbaum	May 11, 1961
145	38	"Money in the Bank"	David Alexander	Phil Sharp	May 18, 1961
146	39	"A Man of Influence"	David Alexander	Harvey Bullock	May 25, 1961

== Season 5 (1961–62) ==
No. overall	No. in season	Title	Directed by	Written by	Original release date
147	1	"Back to West Virginny"	David Alexander	Jim Fritzell & Everett Greenbaum	July 27, 1961
148	2	"Fly Away Home"	David Alexander	Jim Fritzell & Everett Greenbaum	August 3, 1961
149	3	"September Song"	David Alexander	Jim Fritzell & Everett Greenbaum	August 10, 1961
150	4	"Kate's Competition"	David Alexander	Irving Elinson & Fred S. Fox	August 17, 1961
151	5	"Lost and Found"	David Alexander	Phil Shuken & John L. Greene	August 24, 1961
152	6	"First Love"	David Alexander	Irving Elinson & Fred S. Fox	August 31, 1961
153	7	"Hassie's European Trip"	David Alexander	Story by : Phil Shuken & John L. Greene; Teleplay by : Harvey Bullock	September 7, 1961
154	8	"How to Win Friends"	David Alexander	John L. Greene & Phil Shuken	September 14, 1961
155	9	"The Matador"	David Alexander	Phil Shuken & John L. Greene	September 21, 1961
156	10	"George's Housekeeper"	Richard Crenna	Harvey Bullock	September 28, 1961
157	11	"Excess Baggage"	Richard Crenna	Fred S. Fox & Irving Elinson	October 5, 1961
158	12	"The Trailer Camp"	Danny Arnold	Harvey Bullock	October 12, 1961
159	13	"Luke Leaves Home"	David Alexander	John L. Greene & Phil Shuken	October 19, 1961
160	14	"The New Piano"	David Alexander	Danny Simon	October 26, 1961
161	15	"The Handsome Salesman"	David Alexander	John L. Greene & Phil Shuken	November 2, 1961
162	16	"Honesty is the Best Policy"	Sidney Miller	Irving Elinson & Fred S. Fox	November 9, 1961
163	17	"Cyrano McCoy"	Richard Crenna	John L. Greene & Phil Shuken	November 16, 1961
164	18	"The Diamond Ring"	David Alexander	Harvey Bullock	November 23, 1961
165	19	"The Berry Crisis"	David Alexander	John L. Greene & Phil Shuken	November 30, 1961
166	20	"The Rich Boy"	David Alexander	John L. Greene & Phil Shuken	December 7, 1961
167	21	"The Gamblers"	David Alexander	Phil Shuken & John L. Greene	December 14, 1961
168	22	"The Marriage Counselor"	David Alexander	Fred S. Fox & Irving Elinson	December 21, 1961
169	23	"The Washing Machine"	David Alexander	John L. Greene & Phil Shuken	January 11, 1962
170	24	"Pepino McCoy, Citizen"	David Alexander	Irving Elinson & Fred S. Fox	January 18, 1962
171	25	"Meeting Hassie's Friends"	David Alexander	John L. Greene & Phil Shuken	January 25, 1962
172	26	"The Law and Mr. McCoy"	David Alexander	John Bradford & Ray Brenner	February 1, 1962
173	27	"George's Nephew"	David Alexander	Fred S. Fox & Irving Elinson	February 8, 1962
174	28	"Made in Italy"	Richard Crenna	John L. Greene & Phil Shuken	February 22, 1962
175	29	"Who's Margie?"	Sidney Miller	John L. Greene & Phil Shuken	March 1, 1962
176	30	"You're as Young as You Feel"	Sidney Miller	Harvey Bullock	March 8, 1962
177	31	"Double Date"	Richard Crenna	Paul David	March 15, 1962
178	32	"In Grampa We Trust"	David Alexander	John L. Greene & Phil Shuken	March 22, 1962
179	33	"Never a Lender Be"	David Alexander	Irving Elinson & Fred S. Fox	March 29, 1962
180	34	"Allergies Anonymous"	David Alexander	Story by : Sherry Cloth; Teleplay by : Danny Arnold	April 5, 1962
181	35	"Pepino's Fortune"	David Alexander	Phil Shuken & John L. Greene	April 12, 1962
182	36	"Pepino's Vacation"	Richard Crenna	Fred S. Fox & Irving Elinson	April 19, 1962
183	37	"Bubble, Bubble, Toil and Trouble"	David Alexander	Harvey Bullock	April 26, 1962
184	38	"Don't Judge a Book"	David Alexander	Fred S. Fox & Irving Elinson	May 3, 1962
185	39	"The Raffle Ticket"	David Alexander	John L. Greene & Phil Shuken	May 10, 1962

== Season 6 (1962–63) ==
No. overall	No. in season	Title	Directed by	Written by	Original release date
186	1	"Grampa Pygmalion"	Richard Crenna	Paul David	September 30, 1962
187	2	"Three Strikes and Out"	Robert Gordon	R. Allen Saffian & Harvey Bullock	October 7, 1962
188	3	"Army Reunion"	Richard Crenna	Phil Shuken & John L. Greene	October 14, 1962
189	4	"The Roofing Salesman"	David Alexander	Paul David & John L. Greene	October 21, 1962
190	5	"The Good Will Tour"	Richard Crenna	Jim Fritzell & Everett Greenbaum	October 28, 1962
191	6	"Money From Heaven"	David Alexander	Paul David	November 5, 1962
192	7	"Actress in the House"	David Alexander	Ray Brenner & John Bradford	November 12, 1962
193	8	"The New Housekeeper"	David Alexander	Phil Shuken & John L. Greene	November 18, 1962
194	9	"Pepino's Inheritance"	Sidney James	Ed James & Seaman Jacobs	November 26, 1962
195	10	"The Girl Veterinarian"	Sidney Miller	Irving Elinson & Fred S. Fox	December 3, 1962
196	11	"The Health Addict"	Sidney Miller	Irving Elinson & Fred S. Fox	December 9, 1962
197	12	"The Love Bug Bites Pepino"	Sidney Miller	Irving Elinson & Fred S. Fox	December 16, 1962
198	13	"Luke the Reporter"	Sidney Miller	Irving Elinson & Fred S. Fox	December 24, 1962
199	14	"The Farmer and Adele"	David Alexander	Ed James & Seaman Jacobs	December 30, 1962
200	15	"The Crop Duster"	Sidney Miller	Paul David & John L. Greene	January 6, 1963
201	16	"Cupid Wore a Tail"	Sidney Miller	Ed James & Seaman Jacobs	January 13, 1963
202	17	"The Other Side of the Fence"	David Alexander	Ed James & Seaman Jacobs	January 20, 1963
203	18	"Sir Fergus McCoy"	David Alexander	Paul David & John L. Greene	January 27, 1963
204	19	"Little Boy Blew"	Richard Crenna	Ed James & Seaman Jacobs	February 3, 1963
205	20	"Luke in the Ivy League"	David Alexander	Jim Fritzell & Everett Greenbaum	February 10, 1963
206	21	"Aunt Win Arrives"	David Alexander	Ed James & Seaman Jacobs	February 17, 1963
207	22	"Aunt Win's Conquest"	Richard Crenna	Irving Pincus	February 24, 1963
208	23	"Grampa's Apron Strings"	Richard Crenna	Irving Elinson & Fred S. Fox	March 3, 1963
209	24	"Aunt Win Steps In"	Robert Gordon	Ed James & Seaman Jacobs	March 10, 1963
210	25	"How're You Gonna Keep 'Em Down on the Farm?"	Richard Crenna	Ed James & Seaman Jacobs	March 17, 1963
211	26	"Luke the Dog Catcher"	Robert Gordon	Paul David & John L. Greene	March 24, 1963
212	27	"The Incorruptibles"	David Alexander	Paul David & John L. Greene	March 31, 1963
213	28	"The McCoy Hex"	David Alexander	Paul David & John L. Greene	April 7, 1963
214	29	"Skeleton in the Closet"	David Alexander	Ray Brenner	April 14, 1963
215	30	"Uncle Rightly and the Musical Milker"	Sidney Miller	Ed James & Seaman Jacobs	April 21, 1963
216	31	"Up to Their Ears in Corn"	David Alexander	Ed James & Seaman Jacobs	April 28, 1963
217	32	"The McCoy Sound"	Sidney Miller	Paul David & John L. Greene	May 5, 1963
218	33	"Luke Grows a Beard"	David Alexander	Paul David & John L. Greene	May 12, 1963
219	34	"The Auction"	Stanley Z. Cherry	Ed James & Seaman Jacobs	May 19, 1963
220	35	"The Partners"	Jeffrey Hayden	Irving Elinson & Fred S. Fox	May 26, 1963
221	36	"The Peacemakers"	David Alexander	Paul David & John L. Greene	June 2, 1963
222	37	"Don't Be Nosey"	David Alexander	Irving Elinson & Fred S. Fox	June 9, 1963
223	38	"Pals"	David Alexander	Danny Arnold	June 16, 1963
224	39	"Pepino's Mama"	David Alexander	Paul David & John L. Greene	June 23, 1963
225	40	"Kate's Former Sweetheart"	Hy Averback	Jack Elinson & Charles Stewart	June 30, 1963
