= The Real McCoys =

American sitcom (1957–1963)

- Title card
- Also known as: The McCoys (Note: CBS aired reruns with the shortened title on weekday mornings from October 1962 to September 1966.)
- Created by: Irving Pincus
- Directed by: Hy Averback; Richard Crenna; Sidney Miller; David Alexander
- Starring: Walter Brennan; Richard Crenna; Kathleen Nolan; Michael Winkelman; Lydia Reed; Tony Martinez; Madge Blake; Andy Clyde
- No. of seasons: 6
- No. of episodes: 225

Production
- Executive producer: Danny Thomas
- Producers: Irving Pincus; Norman Pincus
- Camera setup: Single-camera
- Running time: 22–24 minutes
- Production companies: Brennan-Westgate; Marterto Productions

Original release
- Network: ABC (1957–62); CBS (1962–63)
- Release: October 3, 1957 – June 30, 1963

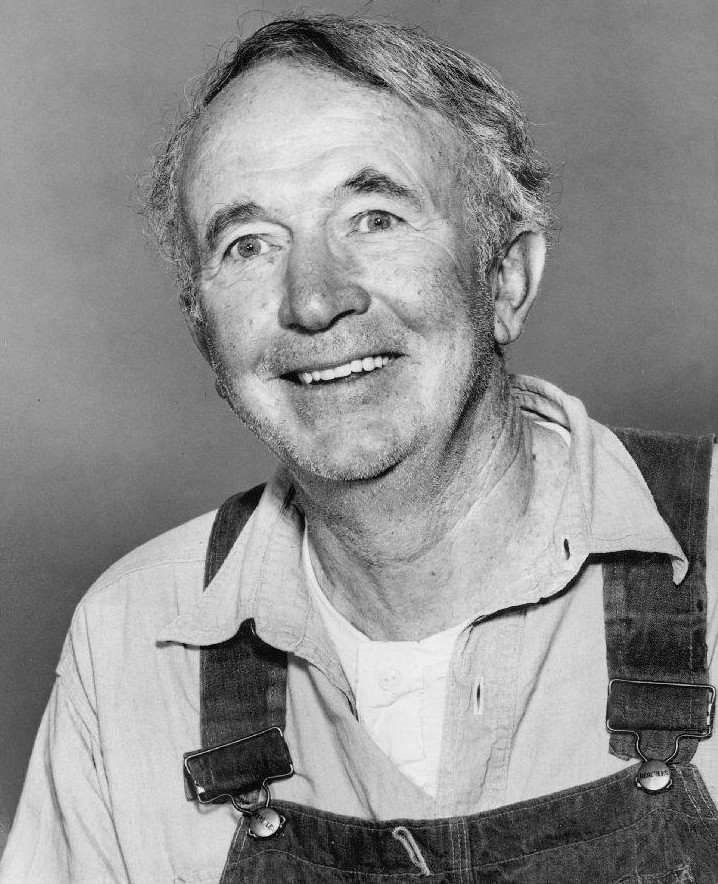
Walter Brennan as Amos McCoy

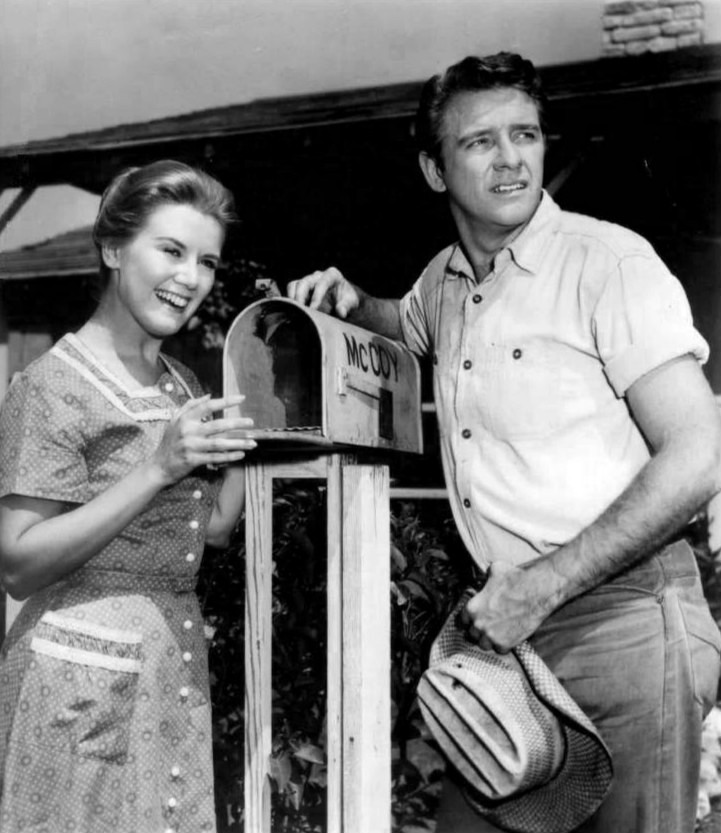
Kathleen Nolan and Richard Crenna as Kate and Luke McCoy

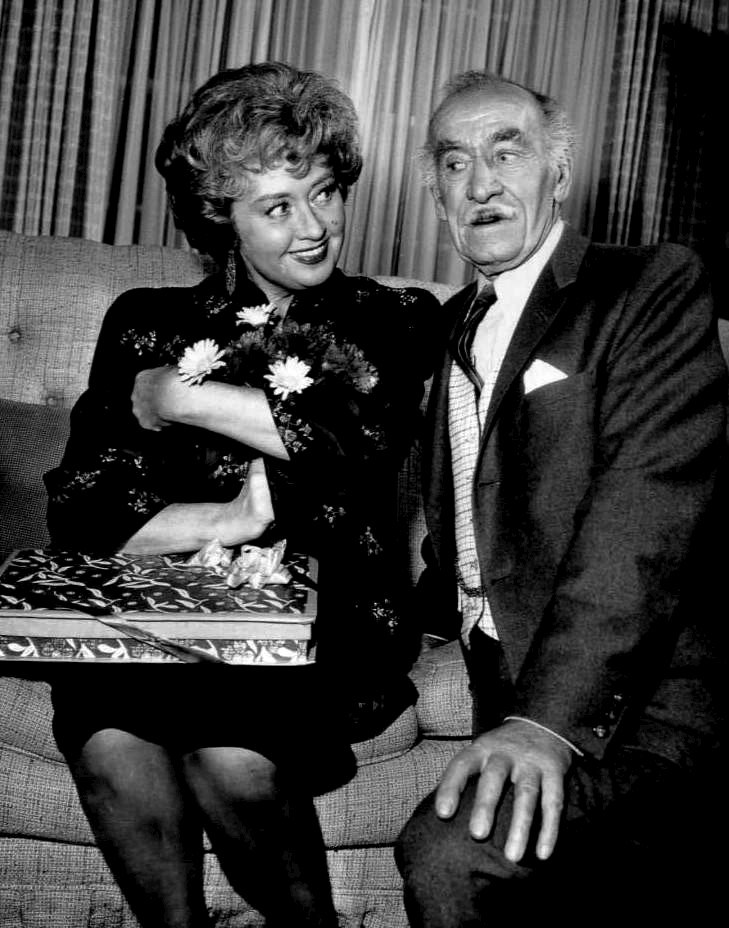
Joan Blondell and Andy Clyde

The Real McCoys is an American sitcom starring Walter Brennan, Richard Crenna, and Kathleen Nolan. Co-produced by Danny Thomas's Marterto Productions in association with Walter Brennan and Irving Pincus's Westgate Company, it was broadcast for six seasons: five by the ABC-TV network, from 1957 to 1962; and a final season by CBS, 1962–1963. Set in California's San Fernando Valley, it was filmed at Desilu studios in Hollywood.

== Synopsis ==
The Real McCoys concerns the lives of a family originally from the Appalachian Mountains of West Virginia, from a fictional place named Smokey Corners. They relocated to California to live and work on a farm they inherited from Ben McCoy, brother to patriarch Amos McCoy. The family included Grandpa Amos (Walter Brennan), his grandson Luke (Richard Crenna), Luke's new wife Kate (Kathleen Nolan), Luke's teenage sister Tallahassee "Hassie" (Lydia Reed), and their 11-year-old brother "Little Luke" (Michael Winkelman). The double naming of the brothers is explained in the first full episode ("Californy, Here We Come"), when the elder Luke introduces Little Luke to Pepino Garcia (Tony Martinez) and says, "Well, you see, in the excitement of having him, Ma and Pa plumb forgot they already had me." Only Crenna appeared in all 225 episodes.

The former West Virginians join the Grange farm association and hire Pepino when he informs them he was Ben's foreman. In the episode broadcast January 8, 1962, Pepino becomes an American citizen and assumes the surname "McCoy." The McMichaels, a brother and sister played by Andy Clyde and Madge Blake in 29 and 21 episodes respectively, lived on the hill near the McCoys. Amos McCoy and George MacMichael, both crotchety old men, sometimes quarreled, often about their games of checkers and horseshoes. Kate is friendly with George's sister Flora McMichael and becomes involved with life in the community.

Although still in her 20s, Kate serves as a mother figure for Luke's younger siblings, Hassie and Little Luke. Many episodes have a moral theme consistent with the conservative opinions of Walter Brennan.

On February 23, 1961, Kathleen Nolan was thrown from a horse and seriously injured while working on The Real McCoys. Her character of Kate was off the series for several months. Hassie left home to attend college, and Little Luke joined the United States Army. For the final season Hassie appeared only in the first episode; Little Luke was never seen again. Amos McCoy did not appear in the last eleven episodes; he was said to be back visiting family in West Virginia. Luke was a widower, and many of the stories concerned Grandpa trying to find him a new wife. This nearly succeeded when Luke met Louise Howard, portrayed by Janet De Gore, a widow with a young son, Greg, played by Butch Patrick, later of CBS's series The Munsters, a relationship which continued through the end of the series.

=== Guest stars ===
Jon Lormer was cast seven times as an actor for The Real McCoys during 1959 and 1960, six as the character Sam Watkins. Joan Blondell appeared three times near the end of the series as Aunt Win. Marjorie Bennett was cast three times as Amanda Comstock. Pat Buttram and Howard McNear also appeared three times; they were subsequently cast as Eustace Haney on CBS's Green Acres and as Floyd the Barber on CBS's The Andy Griffith Show. Olin Howland and Willard Waterman appeared five times each as Charley Perkins and Mac Maginnis, respectively.

Early in the series, Charles Lane, who often appeared in a character role on I Love Lucy, was cast twice as Harry Poulson, a fast-talking egg salesman; Hassie McCoy has an interest in Harry's son. During 1963, Jack Oakie appeared three times in the role of Uncle Rightly. Dick Elliott was cast twice as Doc Thornton, and Lurene Tuttle appeared twice as Gladys Purvis, the widowed mother of series character Kate McCoy, with Jay Novello in one of those appearances as Gladys' intended second husband, a retired photographer from Fresno.

Malcolm Cassell appeared several times as Hassie McCoy's boyfriend, Tommy. Edward Everett Horton (the narrator of Fractured Fairy Tales) played J. Luther Medwick, the grandfather of Hassie's other boyfriend, Jerry; Medwick and Amos soon clash. Verna Felton, a member of the December Bride cast, appeared once as Cousin Naomi Vesper. Jesse White, known later as the actor portraying the Maytag repairman for television commercials and subsequently a cast member of CBS's The Ann Sothern Show, portrayed a used car salesman named "San Fernando Harry" who clashes with Amos in "The New Car" (October 2, 1958). On June 1, 1961, Amos, Luke, and Kate return to West Virginia for the 100th-birthday gathering of "Grandmother McCoy", played by Jane Darwell. In one episode, Lee Van Cleef played an Air Force Security Guard; in another Tom Skerritt appeared as a letter carrier.

The episode "The Tycoon" (August 30, 1960) four years later coincidentally shared the title of Brennan's next ABC sitcom, The Tycoon, with his co-actor Van Williams. Barbara Stanwyck made a cameo appearance in the 1959 episode "The McCoys Go To Hollywood", which also features Dorothy Provine. In 1961, Fay Wray is featured in the episode "Theatre in the Barn", as herself. She volunteers to direct a local amateur production to raise money for the Grange.

== Episodes ==
Season	Episodes	Originally released		Rank	Average viewership (in millions)
Season	Episodes	First released	Last released	Rank	Average viewership (in millions)
1	39	October 3, 1957	June 26, 1958	—N/a (Note: Not in top 30)	—N/a
2	39	October 2, 1958	June 25, 1959	8	13.2
3	29	July 16, 1959	March 17, 1960	11	12.9
4	39	August 4, 1960	May 25, 1961	5	13
5	39	July 27, 1961	May 10, 1962	14	11.7
6	40	September 30, 1962	June 30, 1963	—N/a	—N/a

== Home media ==
Infinity Entertainment released the first four seasons of The Real McCoys on DVD between 2007 and 2010.

On May 7, 2012, it was announced that Inception Media Group (IMG) had acquired the rights to the series. IMG subsequently re-released the first two seasons on DVD.

On June 4, 2012, IMG announced that it would be releasing a complete series set, featuring all 224 remastered episodes. Release of this set never happened, and the rights to the series' home videos later moved to SFM Entertainment, which released the series on August 29, 2017.

DVD name	No. of episodes	Release date
Complete Season 1	39	July 24, 2007; July 24, 2012(re-release)
Complete Season 2	39	October 30, 2007; November 13, 2012(re-release)
Complete Season 3	39	June 17, 2008; August 26, 2014(re-release)
Complete Season 4	39	June 29, 2010; August 26, 2014 (re-release)
Complete Season 5	29	August 26, 2014
Complete Season 6	39	August 26, 2014
The Complete Series	224	August 29, 2017

== Ratings ==
Season	Time slot (ET)	Rank	Rating
1957–1958	Thursday at 8:30–9:00 p.m.	#30	26.6 (Tied with The Loretta Young Show and Zorro)
1958–1959	Thursday at 8:30–9:00 p.m.	#8	30.1
1959–1960	Thursday at 8:30–9:00 p.m.	#11	28.2
1960–1961	Thursday at 8:30–9:00 p.m.	#5	27.7
1961–1962	Thursday at 8:30–9:00 p.m.	#14	24.2
1962–1963	Sunday at 9:00–9:30 p.m.	—N/a	
