= Dancing Dynamite =

1931 crime drama film directed by Noel M. Smith

- Directed by: Noel M. Smith
- Production company: Richard Talmadge Productions
- Distributed by: State Rights; Mercury Pictures
- Release date: August 18, 1931
- Running time: 63 or 67 minutes
- Country: United States
- Language: English

Dancing Dynamite is a 1931 American pre-Code crime drama film directed by Noel M. Smith. It premiered in New York on 18 August 1931, and was distributed by State Rights and Mercury Pictures. Dancing Dynamite was filmed on location at Santa Catalina Island.

== Cast ==
- Richard Talmadge as Dick Barton
- Blanche Mehaffey as Helen Van Lane
- Robert Ellis as Lucas
- Richard Cramer as Kelsey
- Harvey Clark as Murray Van Lane
- Dot Farley as Effie
- Jack Ackroyd as Shorty
- Stanley Blystone as Bull Evans
- Walter Brennan as henchman

== Reception ==
A review from The Film Daily on 16 August 1931 praised the film, particularly Talmadge's performance, writing; "Fast action meller with Richard Talmadge out[-]stunting himself in thrill stuff that will please the fans."

A negative review from Variety on 25 August wrote that Dancing Dynamite was a "badly knit story" adding "It is 63 minutes of silly clowning interspersed with acrobatics by Richard Talmadge."
