= Carl B. Squier =

American aviation pioneer and vice president of Lockheed Corporation

Carl Brown Squier
- Squier in 1934
- Born: April 17, 1893; Decatur, Michigan, U.S.
- Died: November 5, 1967 (aged 74); Los Angeles, California, U.S.
- Resting place: Valhalla Memorial Park Cemetery
- Occupation: Aviation executive
- Spouse(s): Lenna Squier (?–1938; her death); June Knight (1949-1967) (his death)

Carl Brown Squier (April 17, 1893 – November 5, 1967) was a World War I aviation pioneer and vice president of Lockheed Corporation. He sold Charles Lindbergh his Sirius airplane in 1931. He was the 13th licensed pilot in the United States.

== Biography ==
Carl Brown Squier was born in Decatur, Michigan on April 17, 1893.

Squier died of cancer in Los Angeles on November 5, 1967. He was buried in the Portal of the Folded Wings Shrine to Aviation at Valhalla Memorial Park Cemetery in Burbank, California.

== Legacy ==
Squier was inducted into the Michigan Aviation Hall of Fame on October 2, 2004.
