= The Ice Flood =

1926 film by George B. Seitz

- 1926 theatrical poster
- Directed by: George B. Seitz
- Screenplay by: James O. Spearing (adaptation); George Seitz (scenario); Gladys Lehman (scenario)
- Based on: The Brute Breaker (novelette) by Johnston McCulley
- Produced by: Carl Laemmle
- Starring: Kenneth Harlan; Viola Dana
- Cinematography: Merritt B. Gerstad
- Edited by: Raymond Curtiss; Maurice Pivar (sup. editor)
- Production company: Universal Pictures
- Distributed by: Universal Pictures
- Release date: October 2, 1926
- Running time: 6 reels; (5,747 feet)
- Country: United States
- Language: Silent (English intertitles)

The Ice Flood is a 1926 American silent northwoods drama film produced and distributed by Universal Pictures. It was directed by George Seitz and starred Kenneth Harlan and Viola Dana.

The Brute Breaker had previously been adapted by Universal in 1919, under the title of the source material.

== Plot ==
Jack De Quincy, fresh out of Oxford, is the son of a wealthy lumberjack who has been sent to straighten out the French Canadian logging camps. He tells his father that he intends to keep his identity hidden, and conceals the fact that he was a college boxing champion.

The toughest camp in the area hears tales from a nearby town of a handsome "wildcat" who has kicked out it's bootleggers and ruffians. 'Dum-Dum' Pete and 'Dumb' Danny laugh as they tell the story, but Marie O'Neil and her disabled brother Billy long to see the mysterious hero. That evening, Jack accidentally arouses the bullies' anger by dancing with Marie O'Neil, the daughter of the camp superintendent, against Pete's orders. Pete challenges Jack to a fight and is beaten badly, but Marie believes that Jack started the fight just to impress her and doesn't wish to engage with him.

The next day the bullies discover their bootlegged liquor has been stolen, and orders Jack to leave camp. He sets up his own camp nearby, but Marie overhears the bullies planning to attack him and follows them with her father to Jack's location. They shoot at a figure next to the fire, and think Jack is dead. Marie and her father are captured, and Marie put on a launch on the river while her father is tied to a tree. It turns out the figure next to the fire was a dummy, and Jack gets the drop on Dan as he investigates the camp, and he takes him prisoner. The other bully is lured to the camp and also made prisoner. Meanwhile, ice in the river is gathering around Marie and her father breaks his bonds, and with the help of Jack, save Marie from the ice floes.

== Cast ==
- Kenneth Harlan as Jack De Quincy
- Viola Dana as Marie O'Neill
- Frank Hagney as 'Dum-Dum' Pete
- Fred Kohler as 'Cougar' Kid
- DeWitt Jennings as James O'Neill (Marie's father)
- Norman Deming as 'Dumb' Danny
- Kitty Barlow as Lumber Camp Cook
- James Gordon as Lumber Camp Physician
- George Irving as Thomas De Quincey
- Billy Kent Schaefer as Little Billy
- Walter Brennan as Lumberjack (uncredited)

== Production ==
Exteriors for The Ice Flood were shot on location in Klamath Falls, Oregon, and the interiors were filmed on the Universal Studios Lot.

== Reception ==
Moving Picture World reviewer C.S. Sewell gave the film a positive review, praising the excellent fight scenes and "generous use of miniatures."

== Preservation ==
A complete 16mm exists and has been distributed on DVD by Alpha Video, Grapevine Video, and TeleVista. The film is also held by the Library of Congress.
