= Lorraine of the Lions =

1925 film directed by Edward Sedgwick

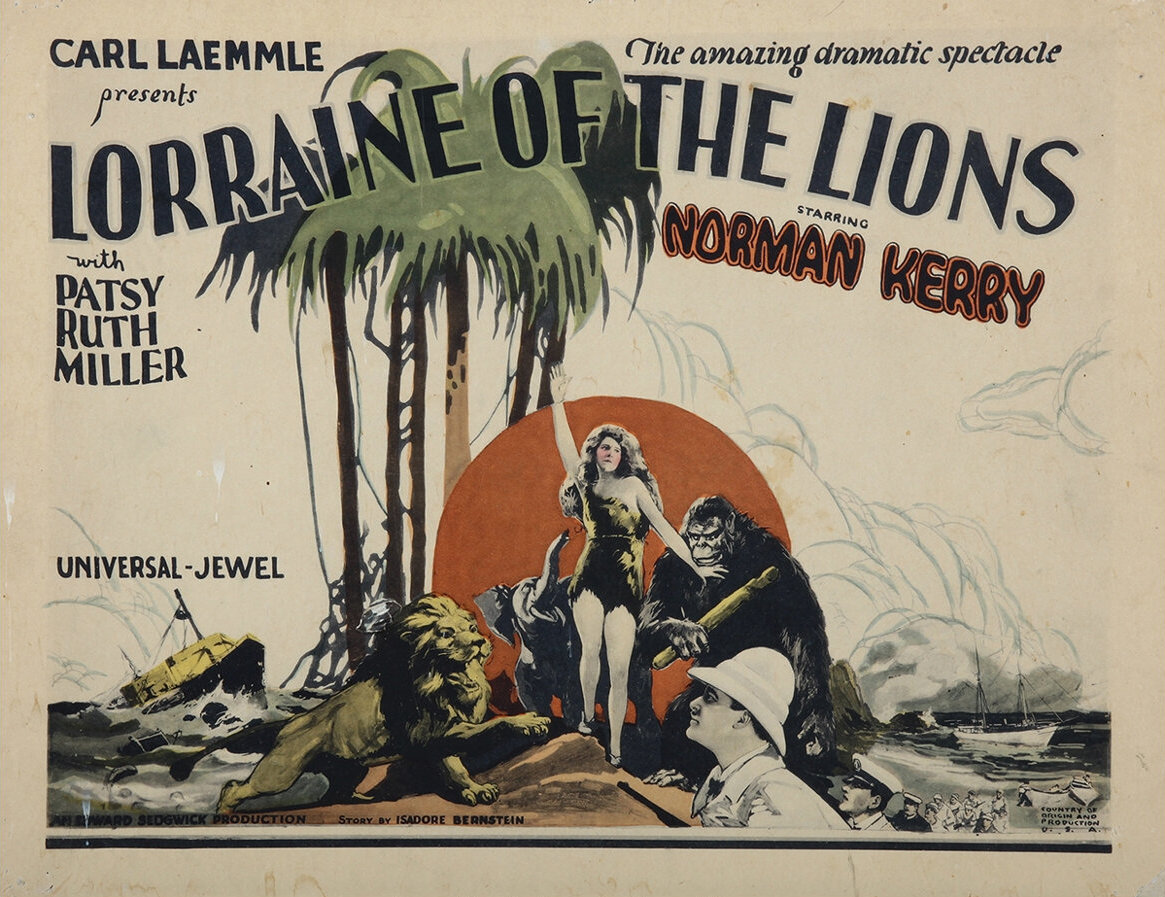
- Lobby card
- Directed by: Edward Sedgwick
- Screenplay by: Isadore Bernstein; Carl Krusada
- Story by: Isadore Bernstein
- Starring: Norman Kerry; Patsy Ruth Miller; Fred Humes; Doreen Turner; Harry Todd; Philo McCullough
- Cinematography: Virgil Miller
- Production company: Universal Pictures
- Distributed by: Universal Pictures
- Release date: October 11, 1925
- Running time: 70 minutes
- Country: United States
- Language: Silent (English intertitles)

Lorraine of the Lions is a 1925 American silent adventure film directed by Edward Sedgwick and written by Isadore Bernstein and Carl Krusada. The film stars Norman Kerry, Patsy Ruth Miller, Fred Humes, Doreen Turner, Harry Todd, and Philo McCullough. The film was released on October 11, 1925, by Universal Pictures.

The full movie

== Plot ==
As described in a film magazine reviews, after an unwanted marriage between his son and a circus animal trainer, a grandfather disowns both parents agrees to take in Lorraine, his granddaughter from overseas. Lorraine is a seven-year-old child when she is shipwrecked while in route to the United States and is rescued by Bimi, a gorilla. Bimi takes her to a desert isle where there are a group of lions and an elephant. The animals teach her and protect her. Her grandfather has employed Don Mackey, a crystal gazer, to use his psychic powers to determine where the child is. Don locates her after she has become a grown woman on the island, and the grandfather and he go on an expedition to get her and her gorilla friend. They find her and they head back to San Francisco. During a storm Bimi becomes panic stricken, breaks from a cage where he has been confined and seizes Lorraine to make off with her. Don fears that the animal intends harm to her and shoots Bimi. Lorraine regrets the death of the beast. Don starts to leave from the place but is restrained by Lorraine, who loves him.

== Cast ==
- Norman Kerry as Don Mackay
- Patsy Ruth Miller as Lorraine
- Fred Humes as Bimi, a gorilla
- Doreen Turner as Lorraine
- Harry Todd as Colby
- Philo McCullough as Hartley
- Joseph J. Dowling as Livingston Sr.
- Frank Newburg as Livingston Jr.
- Rosemary Cooper as Mrs. Livingston
- Walter Brennan as Minor Role (uncredited)
- Jack A. Goodrich as Young Bimi (uncredited)
- W. Stuart McCrea as Ship's Captain (uncredited)

== Preservation ==
Prints of Lorraine of the Lions are held by the UCLA Film & Television Archive, Cinémathèque québécoise in Montreal, and Library of Congress.
