= Geneva Mitchell =

American actress (1908–1949)

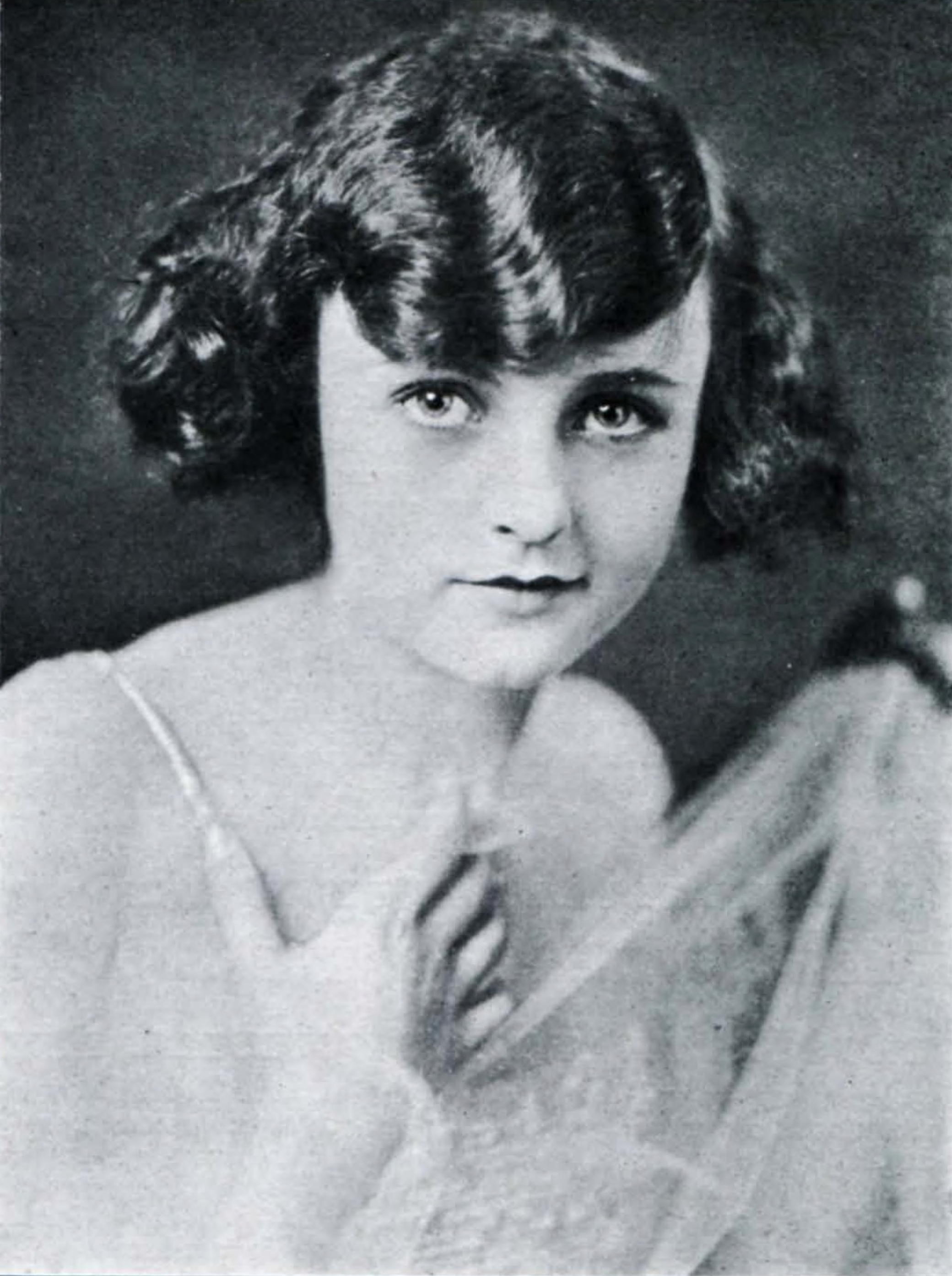
- Mitchell in 1921
- Born: Geneva Doris Mitchell; February 3, 1908; Medaryville, Indiana, U.S.
- Died: March 10, 1949 (aged 41); Los Angeles, California, U.S.
- Occupation: Actress
- Years active: 1920–1946
- Spouses: Robert Savage (m. 1922; div. 1922) Harry J. Bryant (m. 1935)

Geneva Doris Mitchell (February 3, 1908 – March 10, 1949) was an American actress. After beginning her entertainment career as a chorus girl at the age of twelve, she became more well known for her roles in several Hollywood films.

== Early years ==
Mitchell was born in Medaryville, Indiana. Her mother, Verna Mitchell Foss, danced in the Ziegfeld Follies.

== Career ==
Mitchell started her career on the stage in a musical comedy. At age 17, she was in the choruses of Sally and the Ziegfeld Follies of 1921.

She signed a contract with Warner Brothers in October 1929, and with Columbia Pictures in June 1934. Modern viewers will recognize Mitchell from her appearances in the Three Stooges 1935 films Restless Knights, Pop Goes the Easel, and particularly Hoi Polloi. In Hoi Polloi, Mitchell plays a dance instructor who directs the Stooges to "do exactly as I do." Before she begins her dance, a bumblebee lands on her bare back, and then crawls under her dress. She becomes alarmed. Naturally, the Stooges mimic her every startled move. This hilarious footage was to be reused six years later in In the Sweet Pie and Pie.

== Death ==
Poor health, reportedly due to alcoholism, curtailed Mitchell's career after 1936, as she appeared in only one film throughout the 1940s. She died in Los Angeles, California on March 10, 1949, at age 41.

== Personal life ==
Mitchell's circumstances often made the news. In March 1922, when she was 14, she married Robert Savage, the son of a millionaire, in Milford, Connecticut. Five days later, she returned his ring and said, "I'm too young to be a wife." On October 15, 1935, she married financier Harry J. Bryant in Yuma, Arizona.

== Partial filmography ==
- Safety in Numbers (1930)
- The Doctor's Wife (1930)
- The Single Sin (1931)
- Working Girls (1931)
- Night World (1932)
- Faithless (1932)
- The Girl From Calgary (1932)
- False Faces (1932)
- Get That Girl (1932)
- The Devil Is Driving (1932)
- Morning Glory (1933)
- The World Gone Mad (1933)
- I Am Suzanne (1933)
- Above the Clouds (1933)
- The Hell Cat (1934)
- Springtime for Henry (1934)
- The Captain Hates the Sea (1934)
- Restless Knights (1935)
- His Bridal Sweet (1935)
- Pop Goes the Easel (1935)
- Hoi Polloi (1935)
- It Always Happens (1935)
- Behind the Evidence (1935)
- She Married Her Boss (1935)
- Western Courage (1935)
- Honeymoon Bridge (1935)
- Lawless Riders (1935)
- Fighting Shadows (1935)
- The Crime Patrol (1936)
- The Cattle Thief (1936)
- Andy Plays Hookey (1946)
