= Restless Knights =

1935 American short film by Charles Lamont

- Directed by: Charles Lamont
- Written by: Felix Adler
- Produced by: Jules White
- Starring: Moe Howard; Larry Fine; Curly Howard; Geneva Mitchell; James Howard; Bud O'Neill; Walter Brennan; Stanley Blystone
- Cinematography: Benjamin H. Kline
- Edited by: William Lyon
- Distributed by: Columbia Pictures
- Release date: February 20, 1935 (U.S.)
- Running time: 16:11
- Country: United States
- Language: English

Restless Knights is a 1935 short subject directed by Charles Lamont starring American slapstick comedy team The Three Stooges (Moe Howard, Larry Fine and Curly Howard). It is the sixth entry in the series released by Columbia Pictures starring the comedians, who released 190 shorts for the studio between 1934 and 1959.

In the film, three brothers from the Kingdom of Anaesthesia are given patents of nobility (a Duke, a Count, and a Baron) and tasked with safeguarding Queen Anne. When she vanishes during a wrestling match, they are accused of kidnapping her. Evading execution because the executioners are preoccupied by voyeurism, the trio searches for the missing queen.

== Plot ==
Set in the Middle Ages, the patriarch of the Stooges imparts to them, on his deathbed, their noble lineage. Ascending to titles of nobility – Duke of Durham (Larry), Count of Fife (Moe), and Baron of Gray Matter (Curly) – they pledge to safeguard Queen Anne of their ancestral realm, Anesthesia. Rumors circulate of an impending coup orchestrated by Prince Boris, the current prime minister, prompting the Stooges to fulfill their father's charge.

As royal guards under their misremembered pseudonyms – Duke of Mixture, Fife of Drum, and Baron of Brains – the Stooges find themselves embroiled in intrigue when Queen Anne vanishes during a wrestling match. Disheartened by the contest's outcome, Moe and Curly impulsively substitute for the combatants, with Larry officiating. Following a tumultuous bout, the queen's disappearance casts suspicion on the Stooges, leading to their arrest and sentencing to execution by crossbows.

Fortuitously, the executioners' distraction by a woman undressing affords the Stooges an opportunity to evade their fate. A chance encounter with a dropped jug reveals a crucial clue – the queen's whereabouts concealed in the wine cellar. Employing a plan to physically overcome their adversaries, the Stooges encounter setbacks and comedic mishaps, accidentally incapacitating each other and, regrettably, the queen.

== Production notes ==
Restless Knights was filmed on December 19–22, 1934. The film title Restless Knights is a pun on "restless nights," or chronic insomnia. Opening theme music was titled "Entry of the Giants," composed by Louis Silvers.

This short marked the second and final appearance of co-star Walter Brennan in a Stooge short after appearing in the first short 'Woman Haters'.

The title Duke of Durham references Duke University, which has been in Durham, North Carolina since 1892.

The title Baron of Gray Matter is a pun on "barren of gray matter" - i.e., brainless.
