= Paradise Valley (film) =

1934 film

- Directed by: James P. Hogan
- Written by: Ira Anson; Francis Wheeler; George Arthur Durlam
- Produced by: William M. Pizor; James P. Hogan; Joe Wilson
- Starring: Jean Chatburn; Wheeler Oakman; Walter Brennan
- Cinematography: Brydon Baker
- Edited by: Henry Adams; Nathan Cy Braunstein
- Production company: Imperial Productions
- Distributed by: Imperial Distributing Corporation
- Release date: January 27, 1934
- Running time: 51 minutes
- Country: United States
- Language: English

Paradise Valley is a 1934 American Pre-Code western film directed by James P. Hogan and starring Jean Chatburn, Wheeler Oakman and Walter Brennan. It was an independent production made on Poverty Row.

== Plot ==
A radio singer tires of life in the big city and moves into the country in a valley where a long-standing battle has been raging between sheepherders and cattlemen. His dog Gandhi is quickly but wrongly suspected of killing sheep.

== Cast ==
- Sam Pierce as 'Wing' Bonner
- Jean Chatburn as Peggy Crawford
- Wheeler Oakman as 'Smiley' Mason
- Arthur Loft as Sanchez
- Jimmy Aubrey as Scotty
- Si Jenks as Si
- Donny Baker as Jimmy Crawford
- Aleth Hansen as Lazy Bones
- Walter Brennan as Farmer Hiram
- Don Paul as Singing Cowboy
- The Beverly Hillbillies as Western Band
- Zanda the Dog as Gandhi

== Bibliography ==
- Pitts, Michael R. Poverty Row Studios, 1929–1940. McFarland & Company, 2005.
