= June Knight =

American actress (1913–1987)

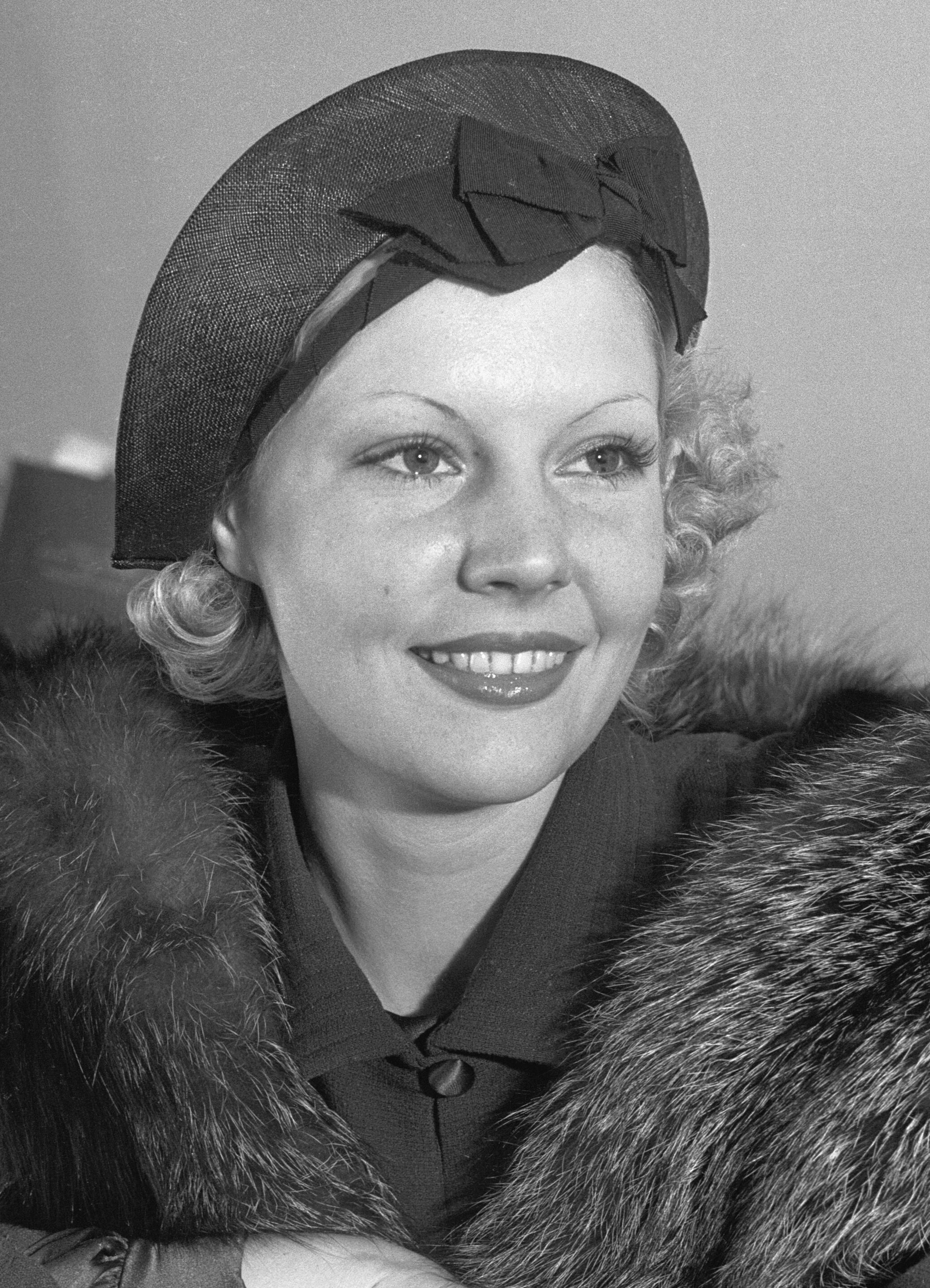
- June Knight (1935)
- Born: Margaret Rose Valliquietto; January 22, 1913; Los Angeles, California, U.s.
- Died: June 16, 1987 (aged 74); Los Angeles, California, U.S.
- Resting place: Valhalla Memorial Park Cemetery
- Occupation: Actress
- Years active: 1930–1947
- Spouse(s): Paul Ames (1934–1935); Arthur Cameron (1938–1943); Carl B. Squier (1949–1967) (his death); Jack Buehler (1969–1987) (her death)

June Knight, born Margaret Rose Valliquietto (January 22, 1913 – June 16, 1987), was an American theatre actress, film actress, dancer and singer.

== Early years ==
Valliquietto was born in Los Angeles in 1913. She was ill early in her life, and was diagnosed with tuberculosis at the age of 4. Following the diagnosis, doctors told her parents that there was a strong chance that she would not reach adulthood. She also had polio, and was unable to walk until she was five years old.

She began to perform songs and dance publicly at age ten.

== Career ==
When Valliquietto first partnered with dancer John Holland, she adopted the stage name June Knight. This had been the name of Holland's previous dance partner.

Aged 19, Knight appeared in the last Ziegfeld Follies show, Hot-Cha! (1932). She featured in four other Broadway shows, Take A Chance (1932), Jubilee (1935) (where she introduced the Cole Porter classic "Begin the Beguine"), The Would-Be Gentleman (1946) (her only non-musical) and Sweethearts (1947).

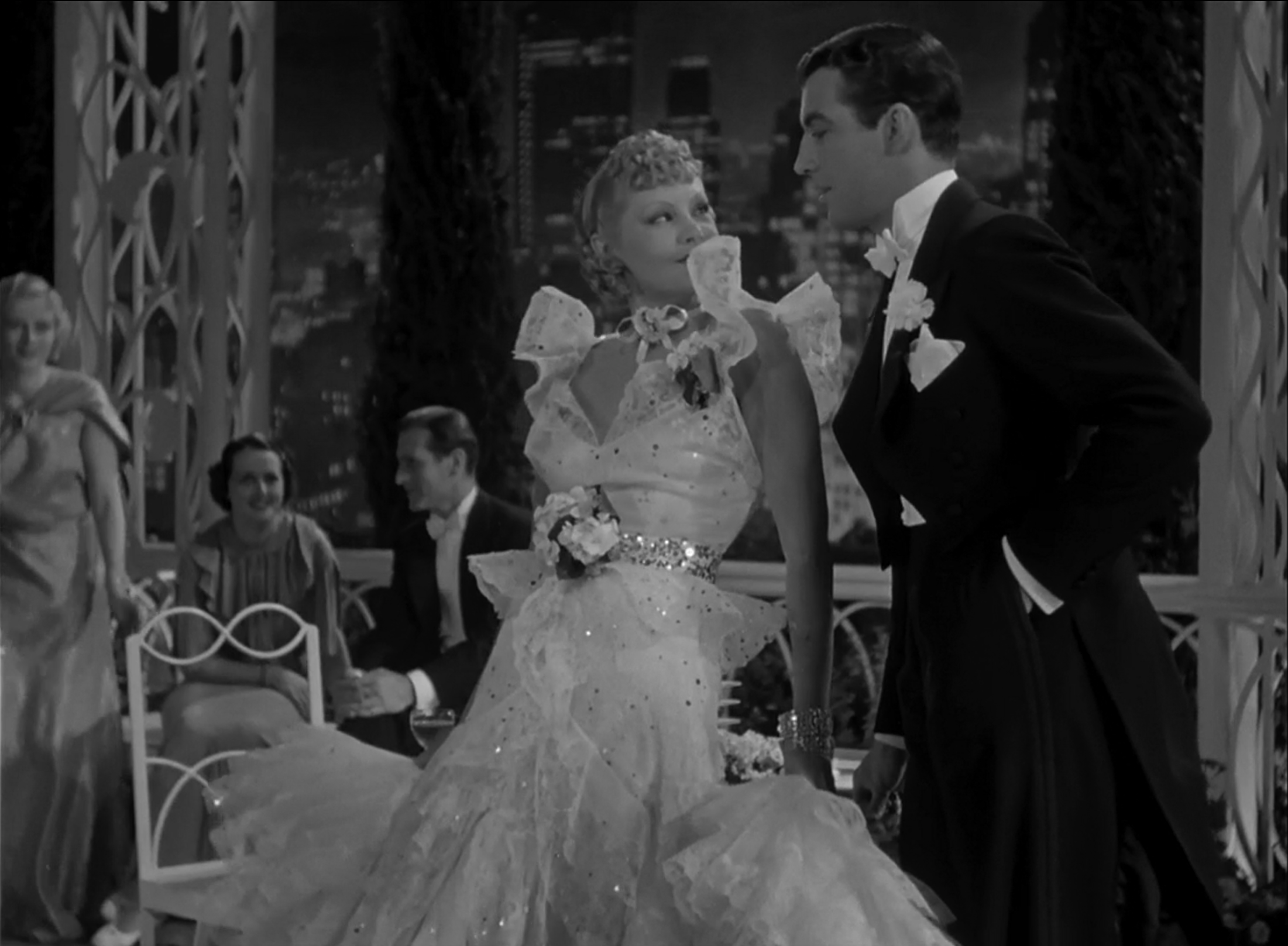
June Knight and Robert Taylor in a scene from "Broadway Melody of 1936"

She also had a short-lived film career, appearing in 12 films from 1930 to 1940, most notably in Broadway Melody of 1936 (1935), in which she sang the hit song "I've Got a Feelin' You're Foolin'" with co-star Robert Taylor.

== Personal life and death ==
Knight married four times. First, to Palm Beach stockbroker Paul Ames, with whom she lived for nine days before he petitioned for a divorce. She then married Texas oilman Arthur A. Cameron. After their divorce she wed Lockheed Aircraft Corporation co-founder Carl B. Squier, whose wife had died in a plane crash 11 years earlier. Their union lasted 18 years. Following Squier's death, she married his Lockheed colleague and friend Jack Buehler.

In 1935, Knight was bound, gagged, and robbed of jewelry by two men, who gained access to her 19th-story New York apartment by posing as film executives. Police believed it was the work of the same men who similarly robbed actress Janice Dawson, by posing as literary agents.

In 1940, Knight (now known as June Cameron), found that the original dancer called June Knight was still using this name, and took the case to court. Knight, the actress, argued that she had registered the name in 1931, and had made the name famous, and that the original dancer had agreed to stop using this name.

Knight died in 1987, aged 74, following complications from a stroke. She was laid to rest in Pierce Brothers Valhalla Memorial Park.

== Recognition ==
Knight received a star on the Hollywood Walk of Fame on February 3, 1960 for her contribution to the motion picture industry.

== Filmography ==
Year	Title	Role	Notes
1930	Madam Satan	Zeppelin Reveler	Uncredited
1933	Ladies Must Love	Jeannie Marlow	
1933	Take a Chance	Toni Ray	
1934	Cross Country Cruise	Sue Fleming	
1934	Gift of Gab	Lottie Von Pepper	
1934	Wake Up and Dream	Toby Brown	
1935	Broadway Melody of 1936	Lillian Brent	
1935	Redheads on Parade	Chorus Redhead	Uncredited
1937	The Lilac Domino	Shari de Gonda	
1938	Break the News	Grace Gatwick	
1938	Vacation from Love	Flo Heath, Band Singer	
1940	The House Across the Bay	Babe	(final film role)
