= The Cattle Thief =

1936 film by Spencer Gordon Bennet

- Directed by: Spencer Gordon Bennet
- Written by: Jesse Duffy; Nate Gatzert
- Produced by: Larry Darmour
- Starring: Ken Maynard; Geneva Mitchell; Ward Bond
- Cinematography: Herbert Kirkpatrick
- Edited by: Dwight Caldwell
- Production company: Larry Darmour Productions
- Distributed by: Columbia Pictures
- Release date: May 26, 1936
- Running time: 58 minutes
- Country: United States
- Language: English

The Cattle Thief is a 1936 American Western film directed by Spencer Gordon Bennet and starring Ken Maynard, Geneva Mitchell and Ward Bond. It was remade in 1939 as Riders of the Frontier.

== Cast ==
- Ken Maynard as Ken
- Geneva Mitchell as Alice
- Ward Bond as Ranse Willard
- Roger Williams as Henchman Hutch
- James A. Marcus as Cal Pierson
- Sheldon Lewis as J. W. Dolson
- Edward Cecil as Doc Brawley
- Edward Hearn as Chet
- Jack King as Joe
- Jack Kirk as Henchman
- Cactus Mack as Fred
- Clyde McClary as Underwear-Buyer
- Bud McClure as Henchman
- Dick Rush as Bob
- Glenn Strange as Henchman
- Tarzan as Tarzan
- Al Taylor as Chet's Cowhand

== Preservation ==
- A copy of the film is preserved in the Library of Congress collection.

== Bibliography ==
- James Robert Parish. Hollywood character actors. Arlington House, 1978.
