= Tony Martinez (actor) =

American film, television and theatre actor

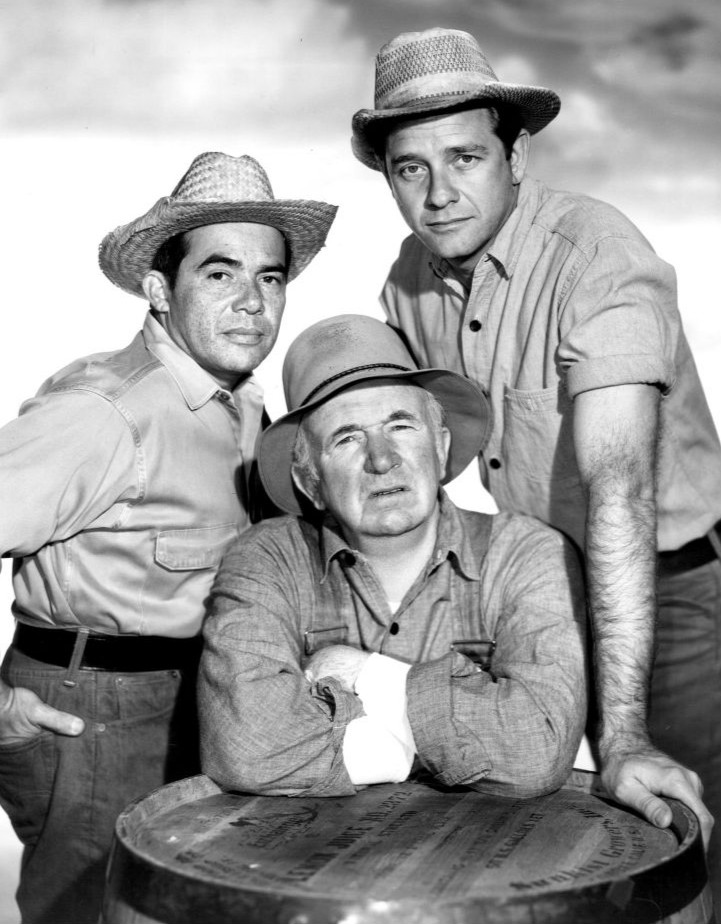
- Martinez (left) with Walter Brennan and Richard Crenna in The Real McCoys, 1962
- Born: January 27, 1920; San Juan, Puerto Rico
- Died: September 16, 2002 (aged 82); Las Vegas, Nevada, U.S.
- Occupations: Film, television and theatre actor
- Spouse: Myra Martinez
- Children: 5

Tony Martinez (January 27, 1920 – September 16, 2002) was an American film, television and theatre actor. He was best known for playing Pepino in the American situation comedy television series The Real McCoys. He was the first Latin American actor to perform in the Western genre.

== Life and career ==
Martinez was born in San Juan, Puerto Rico. He first studied music, in which Martinez later moved to New York City, attending Juilliard. He played five instruments, and formed his own musical ensemble, "Tony Martinez and His Mambo" in New York City. In 1956, his group appeared in the film Rock Around the Clock. Later, Martinez studied acting at the Pasadena Playhouse.

Martinez began his film and television career appearing in small roles, including a credit in The Naked Dawn (1955). In 1957 he was cast in the role of Pepino, the hired Mexican Farmhand farmworker in the ABC situation comedy television series The Real McCoys. He won the role as he was discovered by the creator Irving Pincus and producer Norman Pincus, while Martinez was just with his musical ensemble performing on the Sunset Strip. Initially, he believed that the brothers were pranking him and did not call them back. The brothers reaffirmed their offer, but Martinez still demanded some changes to the characterization of Pepino.

During the 1980s, Martínez was involved in the founding of the Instituto de Cinematografía at Puerto Rico. There, he was also the executive director of the Artists Variety Company. After failing to receive supper from the government, he returned to Hollywood. Despite this, he still intended to create a drama institute for Latin American talent. However, this goal went unaccomplished.

In his theatre career, Martinez had appeared in over 2,245 performances in the Broadway play Man of La Mancha. He played Sancho Panza. After The Real McCoys ended in 1963, Martinez guest-starred in a few television programs including The Man from U.N.C.L.E., F Troop, My Favorite Martian, Accidental Family and Storefront Lawyers. He then wrote music for numerous films in Mexico. As a composer, he authored the song Bacalao con Panas. Martinez retired his career in 2000, in which he last appeared on the cable network The Nashville Network.

== Death ==
Martinez died in September 2002 of natural causes in Las Vegas, Nevada, at the age of 82. The premiere of Hollywood Latino Offspring in 2012 was dedicated to him.
