= Ladies Must Love =

1933 film directed by E. A. Dupont

- Directed by: E. A. Dupont
- Written by: John Francis Larkin
- Produced by: Carl Laemmle, Jr.
- Starring: June Knight; Neil Hamilton; Sally O'Neil; Dorothy Burgess; Mary Carlisle; George E. Stone
- Cinematography: Tony Gaudio
- Edited by: Robert Carlisle
- Production company: Universal Pictures
- Distributed by: Universal Pictures
- Release date: September 25, 1933
- Running time: 70 minutes
- Country: United States
- Language: English

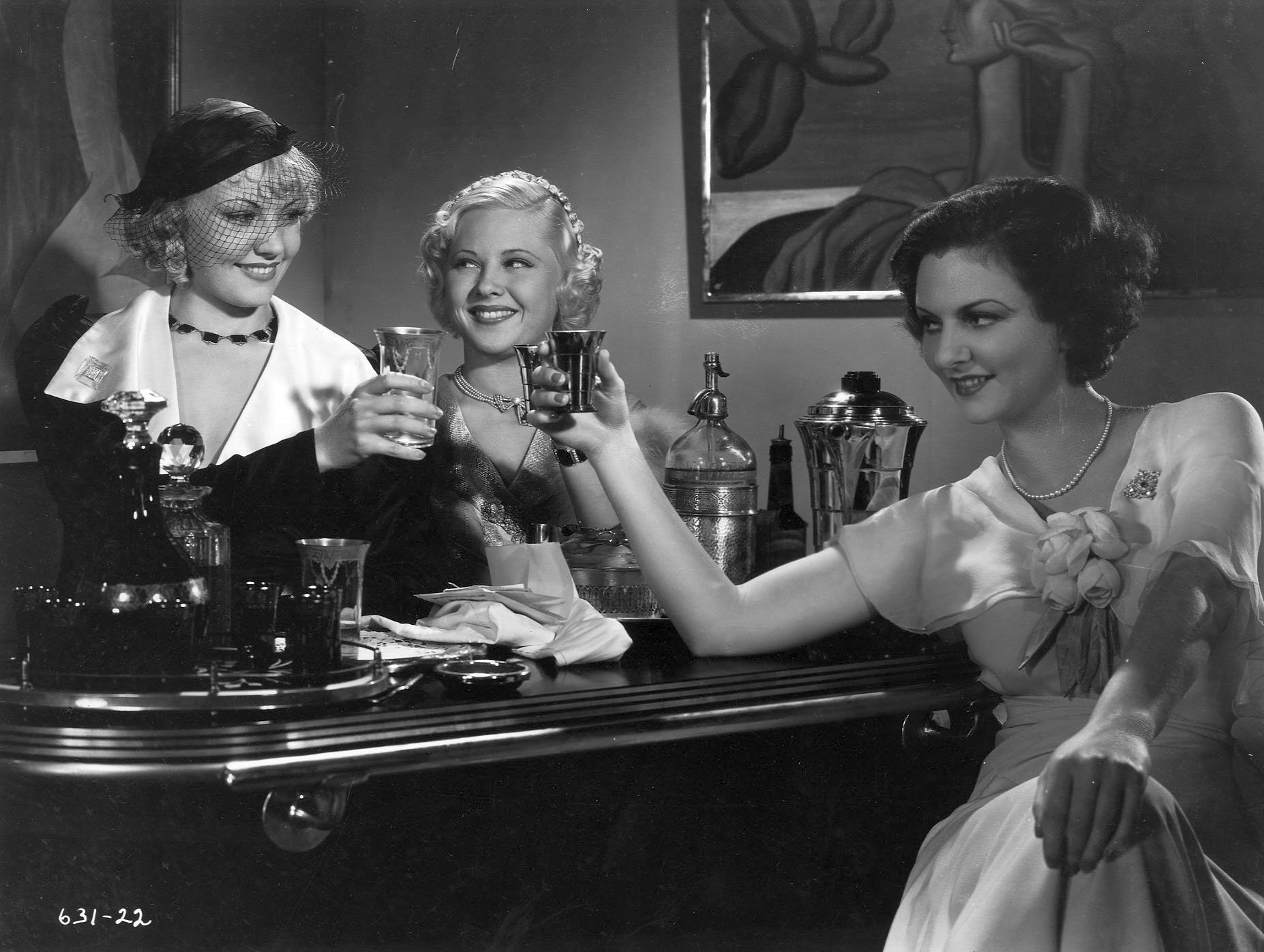
June Knight, Mary Carlisle, and Dorothy Burgess in Ladies Must Love

Ladies Must Love is a 1933 American pre-Code comedy film directed by E. A. Dupont and written by John Francis Larkin. The film stars June Knight, Neil Hamilton, Sally O'Neil, Dorothy Burgess, Mary Carlisle and George E. Stone. The film was released on September 25, 1933, by Universal Pictures.

== Cast ==
- June Knight as Jeannie Marlow
- Neil Hamilton as Bill Langhorne
- Sally O'Neil as Dot La Tour
- Dorothy Burgess as Peggy Burns
- Mary Carlisle as Sally Lou Cateret
- George E. Stone as Joey
- Maude Eburne as Mme. Fifi
- Oscar Apfel as Herman Nussbauer
- Edmund Breese as Thomas Van Dyne
- Richard Carle as Wilbur Muller
- Berton Churchill as Gaskins
- Virginia Cherrill as Bill's Society Fiancée
