= Lydia Reed =

American child actress

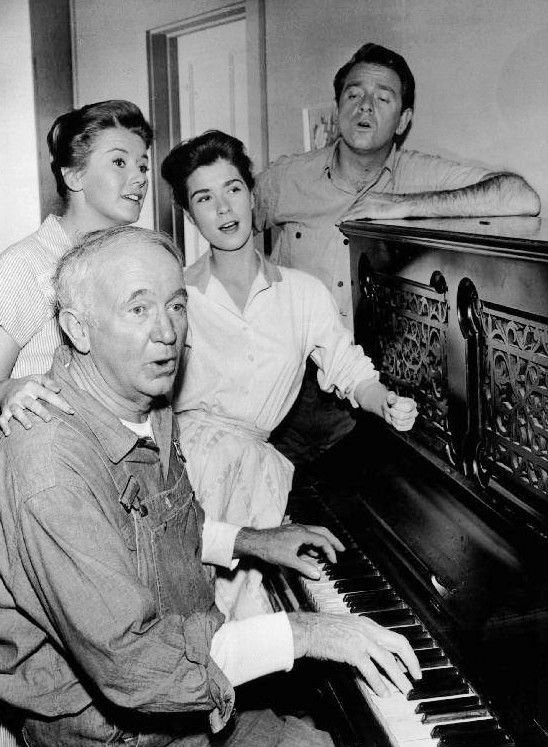
- The McCoy family from the television program The Real McCoys. Kate (Kathleen Nolan), Hassie (Lydia Reed) and Luke (Richard Crenna) join Grandpa Amos (Walter Brennan) in song as he plays the family's new piano.
- Born: August 23, 1944 (age 81); Mitchel Field, New York
- Education: Professional Children's School
- Occupation: Actress
- Years active: 1953–1963
- Spouse: Mario Rodolfo Travaglini (m. 1967)

Lydia Reed (born August 23, 1944) is an American child actress who was known primarily for roles in 1950s films like The Vampire and High Society; she also appeared as Hassie in several seasons of the TV series The Real McCoys.

== Biography ==
Born at Mitchel Field, New York, also known as Mitchel Air Force Base, Reed began a career as an actress as a child after attending the Professional Children's School. She appeared in Broadway productions before acquiring roles in film and television. Her Broadway debut came in Mrs. McThing with Helen Hayes.

Reed's education included three hours of schooling on the Desilu set. That ended at 12:30, after which she took afternoon classes at a private school in Hollywood. She also took classes two nights a week. She sought anonymity among students at the school by wearing her hair differently from what she did on TV and by adopting Tracy as her first name.

Reed was one of three actresses who portrayed Kim Emerson on the television version of the soap opera Valiant Lady. Her acting credits end at age 18.

== Selected filmography ==
- Main Street to Broadway (1953)
- The Seven Little Foys (1955)
- Good Morning, Miss Dove (1955)
- High Society (1956)
- The Vampire (1957)
- The Real McCoys (1957–1963) (TV series)
