= 1957–58 United States network television schedule =

The following is the 1957–58 network television schedule for the three major English language commercial broadcast networks in the United States. The schedule covers primetime hours from September 1957 through March 1958. The schedule is followed by a list per network of returning series, new series, and series cancelled after the 1956–57 season.

As in previous seasons, both CBS and ABC continued to add Westerns to their schedule, filling prime time with as many "oaters" (as they were derisively called) as possible. In addition to several returning Westerns which the network retained on its fall 1957 schedule, ABC's new western series included Sugarfoot and Broken Arrow on Tuesday nights, Tombstone Territory on Wednesdays, Colt .45 on Fridays, and Maverick on Sundays.

ABC, third in the network Nielsen ratings, placed its new Western Maverick in a difficult time slot: Sunday night against two hit series: The Steve Allen Show on NBC, and The Ed Sullivan Show on CBS. ABC aired Maverick one half-hour prior to the Allen and Sullivan programs; the strategy was designed to "hook the audience before it fell into its usual viewing habits". This risky approach proved successful, as CBS' powerhouse Sunday night lineup slipped in the ratings, with Sullivan's show barely missing the top 30 after being among the ten most-watched programs of the previous season.

NBC, late to the Western format, also began plugging Westerns into its fall schedule. New NBC Western series debuting in the 1957–58 season included Wagon Train, The Restless Gun, and The Californians (though one NBC executive insisted The Californians was not a Western but a drama set in California in the 1850s).

Another programming shift occurred at NBC: the network's flagship news program, The Huntley-Brinkley Report, moved to the 7:15 PM weekday timeslot, for the first time going head to head against both ABC's and CBS's news programs. The face-off between the three networks' news programs would become the standard model for U.S. broadcast television; the three networks still air their network news programs against one another.

1958 saw a number of executive changes at the networks; these presidential shifts would affect the network television schedules. Oliver Treyz became the president of ABC on February 17, Louis G. Cowan became the president of CBS on March 12, and NBC programmer Robert Kintner became the president of NBC on July 11. Dr. Allen B. DuMont resigned as chairman of the board of the DuMont Broadcasting Corporation on May 13, and the name of the company was changed to Metropolitan Broadcasting Corporation. According to Castleman and Podrazik (1982) the final DuMont Network program, Monday Night Fights aired for the last time on August 4, 1958, carried on only five stations nationwide. NBC's Kraft Television Theatre, which had debuted in 1947 and was the oldest program still left on television, was cancelled in spring 1958. It was the dawn of a new era in television; producer David Susskind, who had produced KTT at the end, would call 1958 "the year of the miserable drivel".

Each of the 30 highest-rated shows is listed with its rank and rating as determined by Nielsen Media Research.

== Legend ==
- Light blue indicates local programming.
- Gray indicates encore programming.
- Blue-gray indicates news programming.
- Light green indicates sporting events.
- Red indicates series being burned off and other irregularly scheduled programs, including specials and movies.
- Light gold indicates programming produced outside of the United States.
- highlight Lime highlights indicates the number-one most watched program of the season.
- highlight Yellow highlights indicates the top-10 most watched programs of the season.
- highlight Cyan highlights indicates numbers 11-20 most watched programs of the season.
- highlight Magenta highlights indicates numbers 21-30 most watched programs of the season.
- highlight Highlights indicates that it falls in multiple of the above categories.

== Schedule ==
- New series are highlighted in **bold**.
- Repeat airings or same-day rebroadcasts are indicated by **(R)**.
- All times are U.S. Eastern and Pacific Time (except for some live sports or events). Subtract one hour for Central, Mountain, Alaska and Hawaii–Aleutian times.

=== Sunday ===
Network		7:00 p.m.	7:30 p.m.	8:00 p.m.	8:30 p.m.	9:00 p.m.	9:30 p.m.	10:00 p.m.	10:30 p.m.
ABC	Fall	You Asked For It	**Maverick**		**Bowling Stars**	Open Hearing	**All-American Football Game of the Week**	**Scotland Yard**	Local programming
ABC	Winter	Local programming	**Maverick**		**Adventure at Scott Island** (Note: Formerly on CBS as Harbormaster)	Open Hearing	**All-American Football Game of the Week**	**Scotland Yard**	Local programming
ABC	Spring	Local programming	**Maverick**		**Adventure at Scott Island**	Open Hearing	**All-American Football Game of the Week**	The Mike Wallace Interview	Local programming
ABC	Summer	Local programming	**Maverick**		**Adventure at Scott Island**	Open Hearing	**Anyone Can Play**	The Mike Wallace Interview	Local programming
CBS		Lassie (22/27.8)	The Jack Benny Show (28/27.1) / **Bachelor Father** (Note: Both programs aired on alternating weeks)	The Ed Sullivan Show (27/27.3)		General Electric Theatre (7/31.5)	Alfred Hitchcock Presents (12/30.3) (Tied with Cheyenne)	The $64,000 Challenge	What's My Line?
NBC	Fall	The Original Amateur Hour	**Sally**	The Steve Allen Show (In COLOR)		The Dinah Shore Chevy Show (In COLOR)		The Loretta Young Show (30/26.6) (Tied with Zorro and The Real McCoys)	Local Programming
NBC	Winter	My Friend Flicka (In COLOR) (R)	**No Warning!**	The Steve Allen Show (In COLOR)		The Dinah Shore Chevy Show (In COLOR)		The Loretta Young Show (30/26.6) (Tied with Zorro and The Real McCoys)	Local Programming
NBC	Summer	Various programming	**No Warning!**	**The Steve Lawrence and Eydie Gormé Show** (In COLOR)		The Chevy Show (In COLOR)		**Decision**	Local Programming

Notes:

- On CBS, Air Power, narrated by Walter Cronkite, aired from 6:30 to 7:00 p.m. from May 4 to October 19, 1958. It consisted entirely of reruns of the series from the 1956–1957 season.
- On NBC, the summer anthology series Decision consisted of a mix of unsold television pilots and reruns of episodes of The Ford Television Theatre, Schlitz Playhouse of Stars, and Screen Directors Playhouse.

=== Monday ===
Network		7:00 p.m.	7:30 p.m.	8:00 p.m.	8:30 p.m.	9:00 p.m.	9:30 p.m.	10:00 p.m.	10:30 p.m.
ABC	Fall	Local programming (7:00) / John Daly and the News (7:15)	**American Bandstand**	**The Guy Mitchell Show**	Bold Journey	The Voice of Firestone	Lawrence Welk's Top Tunes and New Talent		Local programming
ABC	Winter	Local programming (7:00) / John Daly and the News (7:15)	**O.S.S.**	**Love That Jill**	Bold Journey	The Voice of Firestone	**Anybody Can Play**	**This is Music**	Local programming
ABC	Spring	Local programming (7:00) / John Daly and the News (7:15)	**American Odyssey**	**Campaign Roundup**	Bold Journey	The Voice of Firestone	**Anybody Can Play**	**This is Music**	Local programming
ABC	Summer	Local programming (7:00) / John Daly and the News (7:15)	Cowtown Rodeo		Bold Journey	The Voice of Firestone	**Polka Go-Round**		Local programming
CBS		Local programming (7:00) / Douglas Edwards with the News (7:15) (Note: Aired at 6:45 p.m. in some areas)	The Adventures of Robin Hood	The George Burns and Gracie Allen Show	Arthur Godfrey's Talent Scouts	The Danny Thomas Show (2/35.3)	December Bride (9/30.7)	Studio One in Hollywood	
NBC	Fall	Local programming (7:00) / The Huntley-Brinkley Report (7:15)	**The Price Is Right** (In COLOR)	**The Restless Gun** (8/31.4)	Tales of Wells Fargo (3/35.2)	Twenty-One (26/27.6)	**Turn of Fate** (Note: Formerly Alcoa Theatre) / Goodyear Theatre	**Suspicion**	
NBC	Summer	Local programming (7:00) / The Huntley-Brinkley Report (7:15)	**Haggis Baggis** (In COLOR)	**The Restless Gun** (8/31.4)	Tales of Wells Fargo (3/35.2)	Twenty-One (26/27.6)	**Turn of Fate** / Goodyear Theatre	**Suspicion**	

=== Tuesday ===
Network		7:00 p.m.	7:30 p.m.	8:00 p.m.	8:30 p.m.	9:00 p.m.	9:30 p.m.	10:00 p.m.	10:30 p.m.
ABC	Fall	Local programming (7:00) / John Daly and the News (7:15)	Cheyenne (12/30.3) (Tied with Alfred Hitchcock Presents) / **Sugarfoot** (23/27.7) (Tied with Wagon Train and Father Knows Best)		The Life and Legend of Wyatt Earp (6/32.6)	Broken Arrow	Telephone Time	The West Point Story	Local programming
ABC	Summer	Local programming (7:00) / John Daly and the News (7:15)	Cheyenne (12/30.3) (Tied with Alfred Hitchcock Presents) / **Sugarfoot** (23/27.7) (Tied with Wagon Train and Father Knows Best)		The Life and Legend of Wyatt Earp (6/32.6)	Broken Arrow	Telephone Time	**Confession**	Local programming
CBS	Fall	Local programming (7:00) / Douglas Edwards with the News (7:15)	Name That Tune	The Phil Silvers Show	**The Eve Arden Show**	To Tell the Truth	The Red Skelton Show (15/28.9) (In COLOR)	The $64,000 Question (19/28.1) (Tied with This Is Your Life)	**Assignment: Foreign Legion**
CBS	Winter	Local programming (7:00) / Douglas Edwards with the News (7:15)	Name That Tune	The Phil Silvers Show	**The Eve Arden Show**	To Tell the Truth	The Red Skelton Show (15/28.9) (In COLOR)	The $64,000 Question (19/28.1) (Tied with This Is Your Life)	Local programming
CBS	Late winter	Local programming (7:00) / Douglas Edwards with the News (7:15)	Name That Tune	Mr. Adams and Eve	**The Eve Arden Show**	To Tell the Truth	The Red Skelton Show (15/28.9) (In COLOR)	The $64,000 Question (19/28.1) (Tied with This Is Your Life)	Local programming
CBS	Summer	Local programming (7:00) / Douglas Edwards with the News (7:15)	Name That Tune	Mr. Adams and Eve	**The Eve Arden Show**	To Tell the Truth	The Red Skelton Show (15/28.9) (In COLOR)	The $64,000 Question (19/28.1) (Tied with This Is Your Life)	**Bid 'N' Buy**
NBC	Fall	Local programming (7:00) / The Huntley-Brinkley Report (7:15)	The Nat King Cole Show	**The Eddie Fisher Show** (In COLOR) / The George Gobel Show (In COLOR)		Meet McGraw	The Bob Cummings Show	**The Californians**	Local programming
NBC	Summer	Local programming (7:00) / The Huntley-Brinkley Report (7:15)	The Nat King Cole Show	**The Investigator** (In COLOR)		**Dotto**	The Bob Cummings Show	**The Californians**	Local programming
NBC	August	Local programming (7:00) / The Huntley-Brinkley Report (7:15)	The Nat King Cole Show	**The Investigator** (In COLOR)		**Colgate Theatre**	The Bob Cummings Show	**The Californians**	Local programming

Notes:

- **Confession,** with host Jack Wyatt, began as a local program in the Dallas, Texas, market in early 1957. It premiered as a summer replacement on ABC on June 19, 1958, in advance of the 1958–59 television season.
- **Colgate Theatre** consisted on unsold pilots.

=== Wednesday ===
Network		7:00 p.m.	7:30 p.m.	8:00 p.m.	8:30 p.m.	9:00 p.m.	9:30 p.m.	10:00 p.m.	10:30 p.m.
ABC	Fall	Local programming (7:00) / John Daly and the News (7:15)	Disneyland		**Tombstone Territory**	The Adventures of Ozzie and Harriet	**The Walter Winchell File**	The Wednesday Night Fights (10:00) / Famous Fights (10:45)	
ABC	Winter	Local programming (7:00) / John Daly and the News (7:15)	Disneyland		**Tombstone Territory**	The Adventures of Ozzie and Harriet	Date with the Angels	The Wednesday Night Fights (10:00) / Famous Fights (10:45)	
ABC	Late winter	Local programming (7:00) / John Daly and the News (7:15)	Disneyland		**Tombstone Territory**	The Adventures of Ozzie and Harriet	**The Betty White Show**	The Wednesday Night Fights (10:00) / Famous Fights (10:45)	
CBS	Fall	Local programming (7:00) / Douglas Edwards with the News (7:15)	I Love Lucy (R)	**The Big Record** (In COLOR)		The Millionaire (17/28.5)	I've Got a Secret (5/33.4)	Armstrong Circle Theatre / The United States Steel Hour	
CBS	Spring	Local programming (7:00) / Douglas Edwards with the News (7:15)	I Love Lucy (R)	**Leave It to Beaver**	**The Big Record** (In COLOR)	The Millionaire (17/28.5)	I've Got a Secret (5/33.4)	Armstrong Circle Theatre / The United States Steel Hour	
NBC	Fall	Local programming (7:00) / The Huntley-Brinkley Report (7:15)	**Wagon Train** (23/27.7) (Tied with Sugarfoot and Father Knows Best)		Father Knows Best (23/27.7) (Tied with Sugarfoot and Wagon Train)	Kraft Television Theatre (In COLOR)		This Is Your Life (19/28.1) (Tied with The $64,000 Question)	Local programming
NBC	Summer	Local programming (7:00) / The Huntley-Brinkley Report (7:15)	**Wagon Train** (23/27.7) (Tied with Sugarfoot and Father Knows Best)		Father Knows Best (23/27.7) (Tied with Sugarfoot and Wagon Train)	Kraft Television Theatre (In COLOR)		**It Could Be You**	Local programming

=== Thursday ===
Network		7:00 p.m.	7:30 p.m.	8:00 p.m.	8:30 p.m.	9:00 p.m.	9:30 p.m.	10:00 p.m.	10:30 p.m.
ABC	Fall	Local programming (7:00) / John Daly and the News (7:15)	Circus Boy	**Zorro** (30/26.6) (Tied with The Loretta Young Show and The Real McCoys)	**The Real McCoys** (30/26.6) (Tied with The Loretta Young Show and Zorro)	**The Pat Boone Chevy Showroom**	**O.S.S.**	Navy Log	Local programming
ABC	Winter	Local programming (7:00) / John Daly and the News (7:15)	Circus Boy	**Zorro** (30/26.6) (Tied with The Loretta Young Show and The Real McCoys)	**The Real McCoys** (30/26.6) (Tied with The Loretta Young Show and Zorro)	**The Pat Boone Chevy Showroom**	Navy Log	Make Me Laugh	Local programming
ABC	Summer	Local programming (7:00) / John Daly and the News (7:15)	Circus Boy	**Zorro** (30/26.6) (Tied with The Loretta Young Show and The Real McCoys)	**The Real McCoys** (30/26.6) (Tied with The Loretta Young Show and Zorro)	**The Andy Williams Show**	Navy Log	**Confession**	Local programming
CBS	Fall	Local programming (7:00) / Douglas Edwards with the News (7:15)	Sergeant Preston of the Yukon	**Harbormaster**	Climax! (In COLOR)		Playhouse 90		
CBS	Winter	Local programming (7:00) / Douglas Edwards with the News (7:15)	Sergeant Preston of the Yukon	Richard Diamond, Private Detective	Climax! (In COLOR)		Playhouse 90		
NBC	Fall	Local programming (7:00) / The Huntley-Brinkley Report (7:15)	**Tic-Tac-Dough** (In COLOR)	You Bet Your Life (10/30.6)	Dragnet	The People’s Choice	The Ford Show (14/29.7)	The Lux Show Starring Rosemary Clooney (In COLOR)	The Jane Wyman Show
NBC	Summer	Local programming (7:00) / The Huntley-Brinkley Report (7:15)	**Tic-Tac-Dough** (In COLOR)	You Bet Your Life (10/30.6)	Dragnet	The People’s Choice	The Ford Show (14/29.7)	**The Price Is Right** (In COLOR)	**Music Bingo**

Notes:

- On CBS, Shower of Stars (In COLOR) aired on an irregular basis at 8:30 p.m.
- From January 2 to June 26, 1958, Richard Diamond, Private Detective, starring David Janssen, aired for a second season on the CBS Thursday schedule at 8 p.m. Eastern. It returned to the air for a third season from February to September 1959.

=== Friday ===
Network		7:00 p.m.	7:30 p.m.	8:00 p.m.	8:30 p.m.	9:00 p.m.	9:30 p.m.	10:00 p.m.	10:30 p.m.
ABC	Fall	Local programming (7:00) / John Daly and the News (7:15)	The Adventures of Rin Tin Tin	The Adventures of Jim Bowie	**The Patrice Munsel Show**	**The Frank Sinatra Show**	Date with the Angels	**Colt .45**	Local programming
ABC	Winter	Local programming (7:00) / John Daly and the News (7:15)	The Adventures of Rin Tin Tin	The Adventures of Jim Bowie	**The Patrice Munsel Show**	**The Frank Sinatra Show**	The Walter Winchell File	**Colt .45**	Local programming
CBS	Fall	Local programming (7:00) / Douglas Edwards with the News (7:15)	**Leave It to Beaver**	**Trackdown**	Dick Powell's Zane Grey Theatre (21/27.9)	Mr. Adams and Eve	Schlitz Playhouse (Note: Formerly Schlitz Playhouse of Stars)	The Lineup (18/28.4)	Person to Person
CBS	Late winter	Local programming (7:00) / Douglas Edwards with the News (7:15)	**Leave It to Beaver**	**Trackdown**	Dick Powell's Zane Grey Theatre (21/27.9)	The Phil Silvers Show	Schlitz Playhouse	The Lineup (18/28.4)	Person to Person
CBS	Mid-spring	Local programming (7:00) / Douglas Edwards with the News (7:15)	**Dick and the Duchess**	**Trackdown**	Dick Powell's Zane Grey Theatre (21/27.9)	The Phil Silvers Show	Schlitz Playhouse	The Lineup (18/28.4)	Person to Person
CBS	Summer	Local programming (7:00) / Douglas Edwards with the News (7:15)	The Boing Boing Show (R)	**Trackdown**	Dick Powell's Zane Grey Theatre (21/27.9)	The Phil Silvers Show	Schlitz Playhouse	The Lineup (18/28.4)	Person to Person
NBC	Fall	Local programming (7:00) / The Huntley-Brinkley Report (7:15)	Saber of London (Note: Saber of London, with Donald Gray in the lead role, entered its seventh season with a new name, its fourth, and a new network, NBC. It had run on ABC from 1951 to 1954 and 1955 to 1957 under three previous titles: Mystery Theater, Inspector Mark Saber—Homicide Detective, and The Vise. Saber of London was later replaced in the 7:30 Friday time slot on NBC on April 25, 1958, by the western series, Jefferson Drum, starring Jeff Richards.)	**The Court of Last Resort**	The Life of Riley	**M Squad**	**The Thin Man**	Gillette Cavalcade of Sports (10:00) / Red Barber's Corner (10:45)	
NBC	Spring	Local programming (7:00) / The Huntley-Brinkley Report (7:15)	Saber of London	**Jefferson Drum**	The Life of Riley	**M Squad**	**The Thin Man**	Gillette Cavalcade of Sports (10:00) / Red Barber's Corner (10:45)	
NBC	Summer	Local programming (7:00) / The Huntley-Brinkley Report (7:15)	**The Big Game**	**Jefferson Drum**	The Life of Riley	**M Squad**	**The Thin Man**	Gillette Cavalcade of Sports (10:00) / Red Barber's Corner (10:45)	

=== Saturday ===
Network		7:30 p.m.	8:00 p.m.	8:30 p.m.	9:00 p.m.	9:30 p.m.	10:00 p.m.	10:30 p.m.
ABC	Fall	**Keep It in the Family**	Country Music Jubilee		Lawrence Welk's Dodge Dancing Party		The Mike Wallace Interview	Local programming
ABC	Late winter	**The Dick Clark Saturday Night Beech-Nut Show** (Note: Initially aired as simply The Dick Clark Show before Beech-Nut picked up sponsorship for the program from its third episode)	Country Music Jubilee		Lawrence Welk's Dodge Dancing Party		Midwestern Hayride	Local programming
ABC	Summer	**The Dick Clark Saturday Night Beech-Nut Show**	Country Music Jubilee		Lawrence Welk's Dodge Dancing Party		The Billy Graham Crusade	
CBS	Fall	**Perry Mason**		**Dick and the Duchess**	The Gale Storm Show (16/28.8)	**Have Gun – Will Travel** (4/33.7)	Gunsmoke (1/43.1)	Local programming
CBS	Mid-spring	**Perry Mason**		**Top Dollar**	The Gale Storm Show (16/28.8)	**Have Gun – Will Travel** (4/33.7)	Gunsmoke (1/43.1)	Local programming
NBC	Fall	People Are Funny (29/27.0)	The Perry Como Show (11/30.5) (In COLOR)		**The Polly Bergen Show** / **Club Oasis**	**The Gisele MacKenzie Show**	**What's It For?**	Your Hit Parade (In COLOR)
NBC	Winter	People Are Funny (29/27.0)	The Perry Como Show (11/30.5) (In COLOR)		**The Polly Bergen Show** / **Club Oasis**	**The Gisele MacKenzie Show**	The Original Amateur Hour	Your Hit Parade (In COLOR)
NBC	Spring	People Are Funny (29/27.0)	The Perry Como Show (11/30.5) (In COLOR)		**The Polly Bergen Show** / **Club Oasis**	**Turning Point**	The Original Amateur Hour	Your Hit Parade (In COLOR)
NBC	Summer	People Are Funny (29/27.0)	**The Bob Crosby Show** (In COLOR)		**Opening Night** (R) / **Club Oasis with Spike Jones** (Note: Club Oasis, which had a different host for each episode, became Club Oasis with Spike Jones during the summer of 1958 when Spike Jones became the permanent host.)	**Turning Point**	The Original Amateur Hour	The Joseph Cotten Show (R)

Notes:

- Opening Night consisted of reruns of episodes of the ABC series Ford Theatre from the 1956–1957 season.
- Turning Point was a dramatic anthology series consisting of two unsold pilots and reruns of episodes from other anthology series.
- The Joseph Cotten Show consisted of reruns of the 1956–1957 series On Trial.

== By network ==
=== ABC ===
Returning Series

- The Adventures of Jim Bowie
- The Adventures of Ozzie and Harriet
- The Adventures of Rin-Tin-Tin
- The Billy Graham Crusade
- Bold Journey
- Broken Arrow
- Cheyenne
- Circus Boy (moved from NBC)
- Country Music Jubilee
- Date with the Angels
- Disneyland
- Famous Fights
- John Daly and the News
- Jubilee USA
- Lawrence Welk's Dodge Dancing Party
- Lawrence Welk's Top Tunes and New Talent
- The Life and Legend of Wyatt Earp
- Midwestern Hayride
- Navy Log
- Open Hearing
- Telephone Time
- The Voice of Firestone
- The Wednesday Night Fights
- The West Point Story (moved from CBS)
- You Asked for It

New Series

- All-American Football Game of the Week
- American Bandstand
- American Odyssey *
- The Andy Williams Show *
- Anybody Can Play *
- The Betty White Show *
- Bowling Stars (moved from NBC as National Bowling Championships)
- Campaign Roundup *
- Colt .45
- Confession *
- Cowtown Rodeo *
- The Dick Clark Show *
- The Frank Sinatra Show
- The Guy Mitchell Show
- Adventure at Scott Island (moved from CBS as Harbourmaster)
- Keep It in the Family
- Love That Jill *
- Make Me Laugh *
- Maverick
- The Mike Wallace Interview
- O.S.S.
- The Pat Boone Chevy Showroom
- The Patrice Munsel Show
- Polka Go-Round *
- Scotland Yard
- Sugarfoot
- This is Music *
- Tombstone Territory
- The Walter Winchell File

Not returning from 1956–57:

- Air Time '57
- The Big Beat
- Circus Time
- Compass
- Conflict
- Crossroads
- Deadline for Action
- Focus
- Industries for America
- It's Polka Time
- Kukla, Fran and Ollie
- Life Is Worth Living
- The Lone Ranger
- Masquerade Party
- Omnibus
- Press Conference
- The Ray Anthony Show
- Treasure Hunt
- The Vise (Moved to NBC and retitled Saber of London)

=== CBS ===
Returning Series

- The $64,000 Challenge
- The $64,000 Question
- The Adventures of Robin Hood
- Alfred Hitchcock Presents
- Armstrong Circle Theatre
- Arthur Godfrey's Talent Scouts
- Climax!
- The Danny Thomas Show (moved from ABC)
- December Bride
- Douglas Edwards with the News
- The Ed Sullivan Show
- The Gale Storm Show
- General Electric Theater
- The George Burns and Gracie Allen Show
- Gunsmoke
- I Love Lucy (repeats)
- I've Got a Secret
- The Jack Benny Show
- Lassie
- Masquerade Party
- The Millionaire
- Mr. Adams and Eve
- Person to Person
- The Phil Silvers Show
- Playhouse 90
- The Red Skelton Show
- Richard Diamond, Private Detective
- Schlitz Playhouse
- Sergeant Preston of the Yukon
- Shower of Stars
- The Spike Jones Show
- Studio One in Hollywood
- To Tell the Truth
- The United States Steel Hour
- What's My Line
- Zane Grey Theatre

New Series

- Assignment: Foreign Legion
- Bachelor Father
- Bid 'n' Buy *
- The Big Record
- The Boing Boing Show
- Dick and the Duchess
- DuPont Show of the Month
- The Eve Arden Show
- Frontier Justice *
- Harbourmaster
- Have Gun - Will Travel
- High Adventure
- Leave It to Beaver
- Perry Mason
- Top Dollar *
- Trackdown
- The Twentieth Century

Not returning from 1956–57:

- The 20th Century Fox Hour
- The Bob Cummings Show (moved to NBC)
- The Brothers
- Dr. Christian
- Giant Step
- The Herb Shriner Show
- Hey, Jeannie! (Moved to first-run syndication, retitled The Jeannie Carson Show)
- High Finance
- I Love Lucy (first-run episodes)
- My Friend Flicka
- Pick the Winner
- Private Secretary
- The Vincent Lopez Show
- You're on Your Own

=== Dumont ===
Not returning from 1956–57:

- Ethel Barrymore Theatre

=== NBC ===
Returning Series

- American Profile
- The Art Linkletter Show
- The Bob Cummings Show (moved from CBS)
- Chet Huntley Reporting
- The Dinah Shore Chevy Show
- Dragnet
- Father Knows Best
- The Ford Show
- The George Gobel Show
- Gillette Cavalcade of Sports
- Goodyear Theatre
- The Huntley–Brinkley Report
- Kraft Television Theatre
- The Life of Riley
- Meet McGraw
- The Nat King Cole Show
- Omnibus (moved from ABC)
- The Original Amateur Hour
- People Are Funny
- The People's Choice
- The Perry Como Show
- Red Barber's Corner
- Saber of London (Moved from ABC, formerly known as The Vise)
- The Steve Allen Show
- Tales of Wells Fargo
- This Is Your Life
- Twenty-One
- Wide Wide World
- You Bet Your Life
- Your Hit Parade

New Series

- The Big Game *
- The Bob Crosby Show *
- The Californians
- Club Oasis with Spike Jones *
- Colgate Theatre *
- The Court of Last Resort
- Decision *
- Dotto
- Dragnet
- The Eddie Fisher Show
- The Gisele MacKenzie Show
- The Investigator *
- It Could Be You *
- The Jane Wyman Show
- Jefferson Drum *
- The Lux Show Starring Rosemary Clooney
- M Squad
- Music Bingo *
- No Warning!
- The Price Is Right
- The Steve Lawrence and Eydie Gormé Show
- The Subject Is Jazz *
- Suspicion
- The Thin Man
- This is Music *
- Tic-Tac-Dough
- Turn of Fate (Alcoa Theatre)
- Wagon Train
- What's It For?

Not returning from 1956–57:

- The Adventures of Hiram Holliday
- The Andy Williams and June Valli Show
- The Big Moment
- The Big Story
- Blondie
- Break the $250,000 Bank
- Caesar's Hour
- Circus Boy (Moved to ABC)
- The Dinah Shore Show
- Dollar a Second
- The Jonathan Winters Show
- The Joseph Cotten Show
- The Julius LaRosa Show
- The Kaiser Aluminum Hour
- National Bowling Championships (moved to ABC as Bowling Stars)
- Panic!
- Producers' Showcase
- Robert Montgomery Presents
- Saturday Color Carnival
- Stanley
- Summer Playhouse
- Tales of the 77th Bengal Lancers
- The Web
- Wire Service

=== NTA ===
New series
- How to Marry a Millionaire
- Man Without a Gun
- Premiere Performance

Note: The * indicates that the program was introduced in midseason.

== See also ==
- 1957–58 United States network television schedule (daytime)
- 1957–58 United States network television schedule (late night)
