= 1957–58 United States network television schedule (daytime) =

The following is the 1957–58 daytime network television schedule for the three major English-language commercial broadcast networks in the United States. It covers the weekday daytime hours from September 1957 to August 1958.

Talk shows are highlighted in yellow, local programming is white, reruns of prime-time programming are orange, game shows are pink, soap operas are chartreuse, news programs are gold and all others are light blue. New series are highlighted in bold.

== Monday-Friday ==
Network		7:00 am	7:30 am	8:00 am	8:30 am	9:00 am	9:30 am	10:00 am	10:30 am	11:00 am	11:30 am	noon	12:30 pm	1:00 pm	1:30 pm	2:00 pm	2:30 pm	3:00 pm	3:30 pm	4:00 pm	4:30 pm	5:00 pm	5:30 pm
ABC	Fall	local programming																American Bandstand			**Do You Trust Your Wife?** (to 11/15)	**The Buccaneers** reruns (M) / The Adventures of Sir Lancelot reruns (Tu) / The Adventures of Superman reruns (We) / **The Woody Woodpecker Show** (Th) / The Adventures of Wild Bill Hickok reruns (F)*	The Mickey Mouse Club
ABC	November	local programming																American Bandstand	Do You Trust Your Wife? (from 11/18)	American Bandstand		**The Buccaneers** reruns (M) / The Adventures of Sir Lancelot reruns (Tu) / The Adventures of Superman reruns (We) / **The Woody Woodpecker Show** (Th) / The Adventures of Wild Bill Hickok reruns (F)*	The Mickey Mouse Club
CBS	Fall	7:00 The Jimmy Dean Show 7:45 Walter Cronkite with the News		8:00 Captain Kangaroo 8:45 Charles Collingwood with the News		local programming		The Garry Moore Show (M-Th, to 11:30 F)	Arthur Godfrey Time (M-Th) / The Garry Moore Show (F)		Strike It Rich	12:00 Hotel Cosmopolitan 12:15 Love of Life	12:30 Search for Tomorrow 12:45 The Guiding Light	local programming	As the World Turns	**Beat the Clock**	Art Linkletter's House Party	The Big Payoff	**The Verdict is Yours**	4:00 The Brighter Day 4:15 The Secret Storm	The Edge of Night	local programming	
CBS	Winter	local programming		8:00 Captain Kangaroo 8:45 Walter Cronkite with the News		local programming		The Garry Moore Show (M-Th, to 11:30 F)	Arthur Godfrey Time (M-Th) / The Garry Moore Show (F)		**Dotto**	12:00 Hotel Cosmopolitan 12:15 Love of Life	12:30 Search for Tomorrow 12:45 The Guiding Light	1:00 Walter Cronkite with the News 1:05 local programming	As the World Turns	**Beat the Clock**	Art Linkletter's House Party	The Big Payoff	**The Verdict is Yours**	4:00 The Brighter Day 4:15 The Secret Storm	The Edge of Night	local programming	
CBS	Spring	local programming		8:00 Captain Kangaroo 8:45 Walter Cronkite with the News		local programming		The Garry Moore Show	**How Do You Rate?** / The Garry Moore Show (F)	Arthur Godfrey Time	**Dotto**	Love of Life	12:30 Search for Tomorrow 12:45 The Guiding Light	1:00 Walter Cronkite with the News 1:05 local programming	As the World Turns	**Beat the Clock**	Art Linkletter's House Party	The Big Payoff	**The Verdict is Yours**	4:00 The Brighter Day 4:15 The Secret Storm	The Edge of Night	local programming	
CBS	Summer	local programming		8:00 Captain Kangaroo 8:45 Walter Cronkite with the News		local programming		**For Love or Money**	**Play Your Hunch**	Arthur Godfrey Time	**Dotto**	Love of Life	12:30 Search for Tomorrow 12:45 The Guiding Light	1:00 Walter Cronkite with the News 1:05 local programming	As the World Turns	**Beat the Clock**	Art Linkletter's House Party	The Big Payoff	**The Verdict is Yours**	4:00 The Brighter Day 4:15 The Secret Storm	The Edge of Night	local programming	
CBS	August	local programming		8:00 Captain Kangaroo 8:45 Walter Cronkite with the News		local programming		**For Love or Money**	**Play Your Hunch**	Arthur Godfrey Time	**Top Dollar** (from 8/18)	Love of Life	12:30 Search for Tomorrow 12:45 The Guiding Light	1:00 Walter Cronkite with the News 1:05 local programming	As the World Turns	**Beat the Clock**	Art Linkletter's House Party	The Big Payoff	**The Verdict is Yours**	4:00 The Brighter Day 4:15 The Secret Storm	The Edge of Night	local programming	
NBC	Fall	The Today Show				local programming		Arlene Francis Show	Treasure Hunt	The Price Is Right	Truth or Consequences	Tic-Tac-Dough	It Could Be You	Close-Up	Club 60		Bride and Groom	Matinee Theater (most presentations in color)		4:00 Queen for a Day 4:45 Modern Romances (soap)		Comedy Time^ (repeats)	local programming
NBC	Winter	The Today Show				local programming		Arlene Francis Show	Treasure Hunt	The Price Is Right	Truth or Consequences	Tic-Tac-Dough	It Could Be You	Close-Up	local programming		**Kitty Foyle**	Matinee Theater (most presentations in color)		4:00 Queen for a Day 4:45 Modern Romances (soap)		Comedy Time^ (repeats)	local programming
NBC	February	The Today Show				local programming		**Dough Re Mi**	Treasure Hunt	The Price Is Right	Truth or Consequences	Tic-Tac-Dough	It Could Be You	local programming			**Kitty Foyle**	Matinee Theater (most presentations in color)		4:00 Queen for a Day 4:45 Modern Romances (soap)		Comedy Time^ (repeats)	local programming
NBC	Summer	The Today Show				local programming		**Dough Re Mi**	Treasure Hunt	The Price Is Right	Truth or Consequences	Tic-Tac-Dough	It Could Be You	local programming		**Lucky Partners** (to 8/22)	**Haggis Baggis** In COLOR	**Today Is Ours**	**From These Roots**	4:00 Queen for a Day 4:45 Modern Romances (soap)		local programming	
NBC	August	The Today Show				local programming		**Dough Re Mi**	Treasure Hunt	The Price Is Right	**Concentration** (from 8/25)	Tic-Tac-Dough	It Could Be You	local programming		Truth or Consequences	**Haggis Baggis** In COLOR	**Today Is Ours**	**From These Roots**	4:00 Queen for a Day 4:45 Modern Romances (soap)		local programming	

- ABC note: * These series aired under the umbrella title **Fun At Five**.
- NBC note: ^ Comedy Time featured repeats of Private Secretary, The Charlie Farrell Show and Blondie, Then in the Winter, Comedy Time featured repeats of Dear Phoebe, I Married Joan, and The Charlie Farrell Show, Finally in Spring, Comedy Time featured repeats of Blondie (1957 TV series), I Married Joan and The Charlie Farrell Show.

== Saturday ==
Network		7:00 am	7:30 am	8:00 am	8:30 am	9:00 am	9:30 am	10:00 am	10:30 am	11:00 am	11:30 am	noon	12:30 pm	1:00 pm	1:30 pm	2:00 pm	2:30 pm	3:00 pm	3:30 pm	4:00 pm	4:30 pm	5:00 pm	5:30 pm
CBS	Fall	local programming					Captain Kangaroo		Mighty Mouse Playhouse	Susan's Show	Saturday Playhouse	The Jimmy Dean Show	local programming										
CBS	Spring	local programming					Captain Kangaroo		Mighty Mouse Playhouse	The Heckle and Jeckle Cartoon Show	Saturday Playhouse	The Jimmy Dean Show	local programming										
CBS	Summer	local programming						The Heckle and Jeckle Cartoon Show	Mighty Mouse Playhouse	Captain Kangaroo		The Jimmy Dean Show	local programming										
NBC	Fall	local programming						Howdy Doody In COLOR	The Gumby Show	Fury	Captain Gallant of the Foreign Legion	True Story	Detective Diary	local programming									
NBC	Winter	local programming						Howdy Doody In COLOR	**The Ruff and Reddy Show**	Fury	**Andy's Gang**	True Story	Detective Diary	local programming									
NBC	Summer	local programming						Howdy Doody In COLOR	**The Ruff and Reddy Show**	Fury	Blondie (R)	True Story	Detective Diary	local programming									

== Sunday ==
Network		7:00 am	7:30 am	8:00 am	8:30 am	9:00 am	9:30 am	10:00 am	10:30 am	11:00 am	11:30 am	noon	12:30 pm	1:00 pm	1:30 pm	2:00 pm	2:30 pm	3:00 pm	3:30 pm	4:00 pm	4:30 pm	5:00 pm	5:30 pm	6:00 pm	6:30 pm
ABC	Fall	local programming													**Get Set, Go**	Dean Pike	College News Conference	local programming			The Paul Winchell and Jerry Mahoney Show	local programming			
ABC	Winter	local programming													College News Conference	Dean Pike	local programming				The Paul Winchell and Jerry Mahoney Show	local programming			
ABC	Summer	local programming													College News Conference	local programming									
CBS	Fall	local programming						Lamp Unto My Feet	Look Up and Live	UN in Action	Camera Three	Let's Take A Trip	The Adventures of Wild Bill Hickok	Face the Nation	NFL on CBS and/or local programming							See It Now		**Beat the Clock**	You Are There (R)
CBS	October	local programming						Lamp Unto My Feet	Look Up and Live	UN in Action	Camera Three	Let's Take A Trip	The Adventures of Wild Bill Hickok	Face the Nation	NFL on CBS and/or local programming							See It Now		**Beat the Clock**	**The Twentieth Century**
CBS	Winter	local programming						Lamp Unto My Feet	Look Up and Live	UN in Action	Camera Three	Let's Take A Trip	The Adventures of Wild Bill Hickok	local programming					The Last Word	Face the Nation	CBS World News Roundup	local programming			
CBS	Spring	local programming						Lamp Unto My Feet	Look Up and Live	Eye on New York	Camera Three	Our Miss Brooks (R)	The Adventures of Wild Bill Hickok	local programming							The Last Word	local programming		Face the Nation	The Twentieth Century
CBS	Summer	local programming						Lamp Unto My Feet	Look Up and Live	Eye on New York	Camera Three	local programming										The Last Word	Face the Nation	The Search	Air Power (R)
NBC	Fall	local programming												Watch Mr. Wizard	Catholic Hour	local programming	Wisdom	Youth Wants To Know	Look Here	Omnibus / Wide Wide World		local programming	Outlook	Meet the Press	My Friend Flicka (R)
NBC	November	local programming												Watch Mr. Wizard	Frontiers of Faith	local programming	Wisdom	Youth Wants To Know	Look Here	Omnibus / Wide Wide World		local programming	Outlook	Meet the Press	My Friend Flicka (R)
NBC	Winter	local programming												Watch Mr. Wizard	Frontiers of Faith	local programming	Wisdom	Youth Wants To Know	Look Here	Omnibus / Wide Wide World		local programming		Meet the Press	Outlook
NBC	Spring	local programming												Watch Mr. Wizard	Frontiers of Faith	local programming	**Comment**	Youth Wants To Know	Look Here	Omnibus / Wide Wide World		local programming		Meet the Press	Outlook
NBC	Summer	local programming																		Watch Mr. Wizard	Youth Wants To Know	Frontiers of Faith	Comment	Meet the Press	Outlook
NBC	August	local programming																		Watch Mr. Wizard	Youth Wants To Know	Catholic Hour	Comment	Meet the Press	Outlook

== By network ==
=== ABC ===
**Returning Series**

- The Adventures of Sir Lancelot
- The Adventures of Superman
- The Adventures of Wild Bill Hickok
- American Bandstand
- College News Conference
- Dean Pike
- The Mickey Mouse Club
- The Paul Winchell and Jerry Mahoney Show

**New Series**

- **The Buccaneers**
- **Do You Trust Your Wife?**
- **Get Set, Go**
- **The Woody Woodpecker Show**

**Not Returning From 1956-57**

- Afternoon Film Festival
- Medical Horizons
- Press Conference

=== CBS ===
**Returning Series**

- The Adventures of Wild Bill Hickok
- Air Power (reruns)
- Art Linkletter's House Party
- Arthur Godfrey Time
- As the World Turns
- The Big Payoff
- The Brighter Day
- Camera Three
- Captain Kangaroo
- CBS News
- CBS World News Roundup
- Charles Collingwood with the News
- The Edge of Night
- Eye on New York
- Face the Nation
- The Garry Moore Show
- The Guiding Light
- The Heckle and Jeckle Cartoon Show
- Hotel Cosmopolitan
- The Jimmy Dean Show
- Lamp Unto My Feet
- The Last Word
- Let's Take a Trip
- Look Up and Live
- Love of Life
- Mighty Mouse Playhouse
- NFL on CBS
- Our Miss Brooks (reruns)
- Saturday Playhouse
- Search for Tomorrow
- The Secret Storm
- See It Now
- Strike It Rich
- Susan's Show
- UN in Action
- Walter Cronkite and the News
- You Are There (reruns)

**New Series**

- **Beat the Clock**
- **Dotto**
- **For Love or Money**
- **How Do You Rate?**
- **Play Your Hunch**
- **Top Dollar**
- **The Search**
- **The Twentieth Century**
- **The Verdict is Yours**

**Not Returning From 1956-57**

- Air Power
- Big Top
- The Bob Crosby Show
- It's a Hit
- My Friend Flicka
- Stand Up and Be Counted
- Tales of the Texas Rangers
- Telephone Time
- Winky Dink and You
- Valiant Lady
- You Are There

=== NBC ===
**Returning Series**

- Arlene Francis Show
- Bride and Gloom
- Blondie (reruns)
- Catholic Hour
- Comedy Time
- Captain Gallant of the Foreign Legion
- Close-Up
- Club-60
- Detective Diary
- Frontiers of Faith
- Fury
- The Gumby Show
- Howdy Doody
- It Could Be You
- Look Here
- Matinee Theater
- Meet the Press
- Modern Romances
- My Friend Flicka (reruns)
- Omnibus
- Outlook
- The Price Is Right
- Queen for a Day
- Tic-Tac-Dough
- The Today Show
- Treasure Hunt
- True Story
- Truth or Consequences
- Watch Mr. Wizard
- Wide Wide World
- Wisdom
- Youth Wants to Know

**New Series**

- **Andy's Gang**
- **Comment**
- **Concentration**
- **Dough Re Mi**
- **From These Roots**
- **Haggis Baggis**
- **Kitty Foyle**
- **Lucky Partners**
- **The Ruff and Reddy Show**
- **Today Is Ours**

**Not Returning From 1956-57**

- American Forum
- Cowboy Theater
- Ding Dong School
- The Home Show
- NBC Bandstand
- Project 20
- The Roy Rogers Show
- The Tennessee Ernie Ford Show
- The Today Show starring Dave Galloway
- Topper
- Washington Square
- Zoo Parade

== See also ==
- 1957-58 United States network television schedule (prime-time)
- 1957-58 United States network television schedule (late night)

== Sources ==
- https://web.archive.org/web/20071015122215/http://curtalliaume.com/abc_day.html
- https://web.archive.org/web/20071015122235/http://curtalliaume.com/cbs_day.html
- https://web.archive.org/web/20071012211242/http://curtalliaume.com/nbc_day.html
- Castleman & Podrazik, The TV Schedule Book, McGraw-Hill Paperbacks, 1984
