= Top-rated United States television programs of 1953–54 =

This table displays the top-rated primetime television series of the 1953–54 season as measured by Nielsen Media Research.

Rank	Program	Network	Rating
1	I Love Lucy	CBS	58.8
2	Dragnet	NBC	53.2
3	Arthur Godfrey's Talent Scouts	CBS	43.6
3	You Bet Your Life	NBC	43.6
5	The Milton Berle Show	NBC	40.2
6	Arthur Godfrey and His Friends	CBS	38.9
7	Ford Theatre	NBC	38.8
8	The Jackie Gleason Show	CBS	38.1
9	Fireside Theatre	NBC	36.4
10	The Colgate Comedy Hour	NBC	36.2
10	This Is Your Life	NBC	36.2
12	The Red Buttons Show	CBS	35.3
13	The Life of Riley	NBC	35.0
14	Our Miss Brooks	CBS	34.2
15	Treasury Men in Action	NBC	33.9
16	The Jack Benny Show	CBS	33.3
17	The Toast of the Town	CBS	33.0
18	Gillette Cavalcade of Sports	NBC	32.7
19	Philco TV Playhouse	NBC	32.5
20	The George Burns and Gracie Allen Show	CBS	32.4
21	Kraft Television Theatre	NBC	31.3
22	Goodyear TV Playhouse	NBC	31.0
23	Pabst Blue Ribbon Bouts	CBS	30.9
24	Private Secretary	CBS	30.3
25	I Married Joan	NBC	30.2
25	Mama	CBS	30.2
27	General Electric Theater	CBS	29.9
28	What's My Line?	CBS	29.6
29	The Big Story	NBC	29.5
29	Martin Kane, Private Eye	NBC	29.5
29	Your Hit Parade	NBC	29.5
