= Top-rated United States television programs of 1957–58 =

This table displays the top-rated primetime television series of the 1957–58 season as measured by Nielsen Media Research.

| Rank | Program | Network | Rating |
|---|---|---|---|
| 1 | Gunsmoke | CBS | 43.1 |
| 2 | The Danny Thomas Show | CBS | 35.3 |
| 3 | Tales of Wells Fargo | NBC | 35.2 |
| 4 | Have Gun – Will Travel | CBS | 33.7 |
| 5 | I've Got a Secret | CBS | 33.4 |
| 6 | The Life and Legend of Wyatt Earp | ABC | 32.6 |
| 7 | General Electric Theater | CBS | 31.5 |
| 8 | The Restless Gun | NBC | 31.4 |
| 9 | December Bride | CBS | 30.7 |
| 10 | You Bet Your Life | NBC | 30.6 |
| 11 | The Perry Como Show | NBC | 30.5 |
| 12 | Alfred Hitchcock Presents | CBS | 30.3 |
| 12 | Cheyenne | ABC | 30.3 |
| 14 | The Ford Show | NBC | 29.7 |
| 15 | The Red Skelton Show | CBS | 28.9 |
| 16 | The Gale Storm Show | CBS | 28.8 |
| 17 | The Millionaire | CBS | 28.5 |
| 18 | The Lineup | CBS | 28.4 |
| 19 | This Is Your Life | NBC | 28.1 |
| 19 | The $64,000 Question | CBS | 28.1 |
| 21 | Zane Grey Theater | CBS | 27.9 |
| 22 | Lassie | CBS | 27.8 |
| 23 | Wagon Train | NBC | 27.7 |
| 23 | Sugarfoot | ABC | 27.7 |
| 23 | Father Knows Best | NBC | 27.7 |
| 26 | Twenty-One | NBC | 27.6 |
| 27 | The Ed Sullivan Show | CBS | 27.3 |
| 28 | The Jack Benny Show | CBS | 27.1 |
| 29 | People Are Funny | NBC | 27.0 |
| 30 | The Loretta Young Show | NBC | 26.6 |
| 30 | Zorro | ABC | 26.6 |
| 30 | The Real McCoys | ABC | 26.6 |
