= Bill Nimmo =

American actor

William Lorne Nimmo
- Born: June 18, 1917; Cincinnati, Ohio, U.S.
- Died: February 22, 2011 (aged 93); Milford, Ohio, U.S.
- Spouse(s): Mariam (first wife); Helen (second wife); Marian Spelman
- Children: 3
- Military career
- Allegiance: United States of America
- Branch: United States Army
- Service years: 1941–1946
- Rank: Major
- Unit: 1st Infantry Division
- Conflicts: World War II
- Awards: Silver Star; Bronze Star; Purple Heart; Invasion Arrowhead (4) Campaign Stars
- Other work: Television and radio personality, Community Relations Director, Associate Professor of History

William Lorne Nimmo (June 18, 1917 – February 22, 2011) was a television and radio personality whose career spanned seven decades.

== Early life and pre-network career ==
Nimmo was born on June 18, 1917, in Cincinnati, Ohio. His father, William Lorne Zimmo, was a detective in Cincinnati. After graduating from Western Hills High School, he attended the Cincinnati Conservatory of Music and the University of Cincinnati, studying singing and piano. He volunteered for the US Army in 1941 prior to the declaration of WWII. While serving with the 1st Infantry Division in Africa and Europe, he was awarded the Purple Heart, Silver Star, and Bronze Star Medals, plus an Invasion Arrowhead, Combat Infantry Badge, and threeCampaign Stars. Following a year of diplomatic service at the U.S. Embassy in Paris in 1945-46 he was honorably discharged with the rank of Major.

After a short stint as a teacher, he returned to Cincinnati in 1947 and landed a job as an overnight disc jockey at WLW-AM with his distinctive baritone voice. In 1948 Nimmo became Cincinnati's first television star on WLWT-TV serving as an announcer, newscaster, and host of various shows.

In 1959, Nimmo recorded a narration, "The Little Rascals" for RCA Victor (LBY 1023).

== Career on national television ==
In 1951 Nimmo moved to New York and went to work for network television. He played “Bill the Bartender” on the Pabst Blue Ribbon Wednesday Night Fights (CBS), in which he appeared live during the commercials to promote the sponsor, Pabst Blue Ribbon beer. He was also Johnny Carson's original sidekick on the shows Do You Trust Your Wife? and later Who Do You Trust?

When Nimmo left the show in 1957, he recommended Ed McMahon as his replacement. When Carson and McMahon moved to The Tonight Show in 1962, Nimmo returned to Who Do You Trust? as announcer-sidekick for new host Woody Woodbury. Although Nimmo would later admit leaving Carson was one of the biggest mistakes of his life, he had no regrets.

Nimmo was also an announcer for The Jackie Gleason Show in 1952–53, Crime Syndicated, The Plainclothesman, and This Is Show Business, as well as for Jack Lemmon, Garry Moore and Arthur Murray to name just a few. He was the spokesperson on long-running shows for Pepsodent, Newport cigarettes, and Schick electric shaver. In addition he was the host of the game shows Keep It in the Family in 1957–58, For Love or Money in 1958, and announcer on The Regis Philbin Show in 1964–65. Beginning on May 20, 1957, he was host of weekday reruns of Our Miss Brooks on CBS.

== Career after national television ==
Nimmo moved to Hollywood in 1964, acting in films, in commercials, and on The Regis Philbin Show. After a year with Philbin he returned to southwest Ohio for the remainder of his life. In 1966-67 he was the emcee on Be Our Guest (WLWT) with future wife Marian Spelman. Between 1967 and 1975, he served as the Community Relations Director at the University of Cincinnati, and was the producer of various television and radio shows. From 1975 to 1983 he was an associate professor of history at Southern State Community College in Fincastle, Ohio. In 1988 he narrated Powel Crosley and the 20th Century, bringing him full circle in his broadcasting career. In addition, he was a volunteer broadcaster at WMKV (89.3 MHz FM), hosting the radio show Two on the Aisle and WMKV Goes to the Pops.

Nimmo graduated cum laude from the University of Cincinnati with a BA degree in American history in August 1970. He later earned a master's degree from U.C.

== Personal life ==
Nimmo was married three times and had three children. He was preceded in death by wives: Helen Matthews (died 1969) Helen Gillette (died 2008) and Marian Spelman, whom he married in 1967 (died 2007), and one of his sons, Doug (died 1998).

== Awards and honors ==
1956: 'Best Announcer' award from The Auctioneers of America
1966: Appointed Kentucky Colonel
1991: Cincinnati Broadcasting Hall of Fame
1998: Distinguished Alumni Award, University of Cincinnati

== Medals and decorations ==
	Silver Star
	Bronze Star
	Purple Heart
	World War II Victory Medal
	Combat Infantryman Badge
Invasion Arrowhead
(4) Campaign Stars
