= Top-rated United States television programs of 1954–55 =

This table displays the top-rated primetime television series of the 1954–55 season as measured by Nielsen Media Research.

Rank	Program	Network	Rating
1	I Love Lucy	CBS	49.3
2	The Jackie Gleason Show	CBS	42.4
3	Dragnet	NBC	42.1
4	You Bet Your Life	NBC	41.0
5	The Toast of the Town	CBS	39.6
6	Disneyland	ABC	39.1
7	The Jack Benny Show	CBS	38.3
8	The George Gobel Show	NBC	35.2
9	Ford Theatre	NBC	34.9
10	December Bride	CBS	34.7
11	The Buick-Berle Show	NBC	34.6
12	This Is Your Life	NBC	34.5
13	I've Got a Secret	CBS	34.0
14	Two for the Money	CBS	33.9
15	Your Hit Parade	NBC	33.6
16	The Millionaire	CBS	33.0
17	General Electric Theater	CBS	32.6
18	Arthur Godfrey's Talent Scouts	CBS	32.5
19	Private Secretary	CBS	32.2
20	Fireside Theatre	NBC	31.1
21	The Life of Riley	NBC	30.9
22	Arthur Godfrey and His Friends	CBS	29.8
23	The Adventures of Rin Tin Tin	ABC	29.5
24	Topper	CBS	29.4
25	Pabst Blue Ribbon Bouts	CBS	29.1
26	The George Burns and Gracie Allen Show	CBS	29.0
27	The Colgate Comedy Hour	NBC	28.0
28	The Loretta Young Show	NBC	27.7
29	My Little Margie	NBC	27.1
30	The Roy Rogers Show	NBC	26.9
