= For Those Who Think Young (film) =

1964 film by Leslie H. Martinson

- Directed by: Leslie H. Martinson
- Screenplay by: James O'Hanlon; George O'Hanlon; Dan Beaumont
- Story by: Dan Beaumont
- Produced by: Hugh Benson executive Howard W. Koch
- Starring: James Darren; Pamela Tiffin; Paul Lynde; Tina Louise; Nancy Sinatra; Bob Denver; Claudia Martin; Woody Woodbury
- Cinematography: Harold E. Stine
- Edited by: Frank P. Keller
- Music by: Jerry Fielding
- Distributed by: United Artists
- Release date: June 1964
- Running time: 97 minutes
- Country: United States
- Language: English
- Box office: $1,600,000 (US/ Canada)

For Those Who Think Young is a 1964 American beach party film shot in Techniscope, directed by Leslie H. Martinson and featuring James Darren, Pamela Tiffin, Paul Lynde, Tina Louise, Bob Denver, Nancy Sinatra in her film debut, Robert Middleton, Ellen Burstyn, Claudia Martin and Woody Woodbury.

== Plot ==
Rich kid and party animal Gardner Pruitt III, known as "Ding" to his friends, is on the prowl for a new conquest in the form of teenager Sandy Palmer. In the meantime, Ding's influential grandfather, B.S. Cronin wants to curtail the romance and shut down a popular local college teen hangout.

Sandy's guardians Sid Hoyt and Woody Woodbury get mixed up in the proceedings, with Woody becoming the college kid's hero at the hangout. That sends up a red flag to the college administration, which sends in Dr. Pauline Swenson to investigate allegations of underage drinking.

When the clever kids discover that ex-gangster Grandpa Cronin used to be a bootlegger, they blackmail him into keeping the club open.

== Cast ==
- James Darren as Gardner 'Ding' Pruitt III
- Pamela Tiffin as Sandy Palmer
- Paul Lynde as Uncle Sid Hoyt
- Tina Louise as Topaz McQueen
- Bob Denver as Kelp
- Nancy Sinatra as Karen Cross
- Robert Middleton as Burford B. Sanford 'Nifty' Cronin
- Claudia Martin as Sue Lewis
- Ellen Burstyn as Dr. Pauline Swenson (billed as Ellen McRae)
- Woody Woodbury as Uncle Woody Woodbury
- Louis Quinn as Gus Kestler
- Sammee Tong as Clyde
- Jimmy Griffin as singer
- George Raft as Detective Lieutenant
- Roger Smith as Smitty the detective
- Addison Richards as Dean Watkins
- Paul 'Mousie' Garner as Mousie
- Benny Baker as Lou
- Anna Lee as Laura Pruitt
- Jack La Rue as Cronin's business associate
- Allen Jenkins as Col. Leslie Jenkins
- Robert Armstrong as Norman Armstrong

== Production ==
The film began as a script called A Young Man's Fancy. The rights were bought by Frank Sinatra's Essex Productions. The title was changed in order to secure funding participation from Pepsi Cola, who changed their slogan from "Be Sociable" (which had been used since 1958) to "Now It's Pepsi For Those Who Think Young". Besides Pepsi, the film featured extensive product placement for Jax Clothing, Baskin-Robbins, Peter Pan swimwear, Buick and Honda. Sam Arkoff of AIP later called the use of the title "the most ridiculous, hidebound, stupid concept I can think of. To put a middle aged slogan on a youth picture. What kid would go to see a film called For Those Who Think Young?"

The film marked the screen debut of Nancy Sinatra, Susan Hart, Lada Edmund Jr., and Dean Martin's daughter Claudia. Dolores Hart, and Ann-Margret were considered to star. Jeanne Crain was signed for the role of Pauline but eventually dropped out of the project.

Filming began August 14, 1963 at Paramount Studios. The film was shot in just 18 days. The beach scenes were shot at Mailbu Beach, all in one day. Some scenes were shot at the Occidental College in Los Angeles.

James Darren's character drives a 1963 Buick Riviera, designed by George Barris.

== Music ==
Jerry Fielding, later famous for his television themes, composed the score for the film.

Mack David and Jerry Livingston wrote "For Those Who Think Love", sung by James Darren over the opening credits.

Bob Denver sings "Ho Daddy, Surf's Up" and "Ho Daddy, Surf's Up (Reprise)."

Jimmy Griffin (later founder member of the 1970s band Bread), performs the song "I'm Gonna Walk All Over This Land", accompanied by Paul Johnson (of The Bel-Airs), Glen Grey and Richard Delvy (both of The Challengers).

== Reception ==
The film was released in June 1964 and was a box office hit, grossing about $1.6 million, and ranking among the few Essex Company productions to turn a profit.

Over time, the film gained popularity on television, with heavy syndication airplay before becoming a regular fixture on Turner Classic Movies.

Filmink argued "Half the film is a perfectly acceptable beach movie" but " the other half is a vehicle for unfunny comic Woody Woodbury. Maybe we’re being unfair. Put it another way: don’t miss this if you’re a big Woody Woodbury fan."
