= For Love or Money (game show) =

- Presented by: Bill Nimmo
- Country of origin: United States
- Original language: English

Production
- Running time: 30 Minutes

Original release
- Network: CBS
- Release: June 29, 1958 – January 30, 1959

For Love or Money is a daytime game show that aired on CBS from June 30, 1958 to January 2, 1959, hosted by Bill Nimmo. It was one of the game shows implicated in the 1950s quiz show scandals, which led to its quick cancellation.

== Format ==
Each game featured three contestants attempting to buzz in and answer questions first. Each question was associated with a prize and the player with the correct answer could choose to keep to the prize or stop a "dancing decimal machine" on a five digit display which started with the prize value. Later in the show, a home viewer whose phone number was chosen at random was asked a question and if correct, had the same option to take the prize or the money.

The cash values chosen at random could range from 2¢ to $9,999; however, this only lasted the first week. Starting in the second week, the cash values now ranged from 25¢ to $2,500. Thus, the board now read: 2 5 0 0.

In January 1959, CBS network executives learned that the "dancing decimal machine" was occasionally fixed in such a way that the prize amount it would return would actually not be random. This meant For Love or Money was subject to the same sort of problematic production practices as other implicated game shows of the time like Dotto and The $64,000 Question. CBS immediately moved to cancel the series in early February, making the January 30, 1959 episode the final one aired.

== British version ==
In June 1959, ABC Productions produced a British version of For Love or Money for ITV, running for four series until 1961. Its hosts included Keith Fordyce, Bob Monkhouse, Dickie Henderson, and Des O'Connor.

The format was basically the same as the original American version, except that the board displayed a string of four 9s, and the decimal point was replaced with a "flying shilling sign", meaning contestants could win anywhere from 9/- to 9,999/- (just under £500).
