= Cowtown Rodeo =

Weekly rodeo in Woodstown, New Jersey

Coordinates: 39.661544°N 75.375094°W

The Cowtown Rodeo is a rodeo in the United States which started in 1929. It is located in Pilesgrove Township, New Jersey. The event is at 7:30 on Saturday nights from late May through September. Grant Harris and his family have been running the rodeo every Saturday night during the summer months since 1955, when it was first staged as a weekly event. In 1957 and 1958, the Cowtown Rodeo was syndicated on national television. It is sanctioned by the Professional Rodeo Cowboys Association (PRCA). In 2023, the Cowtown Rodeo was inducted into the ProRodeo Hall of Fame. In 2024, it received the PRCA Small Rodeo of the Year award.
