= Harbourmaster (TV series) =

American television series

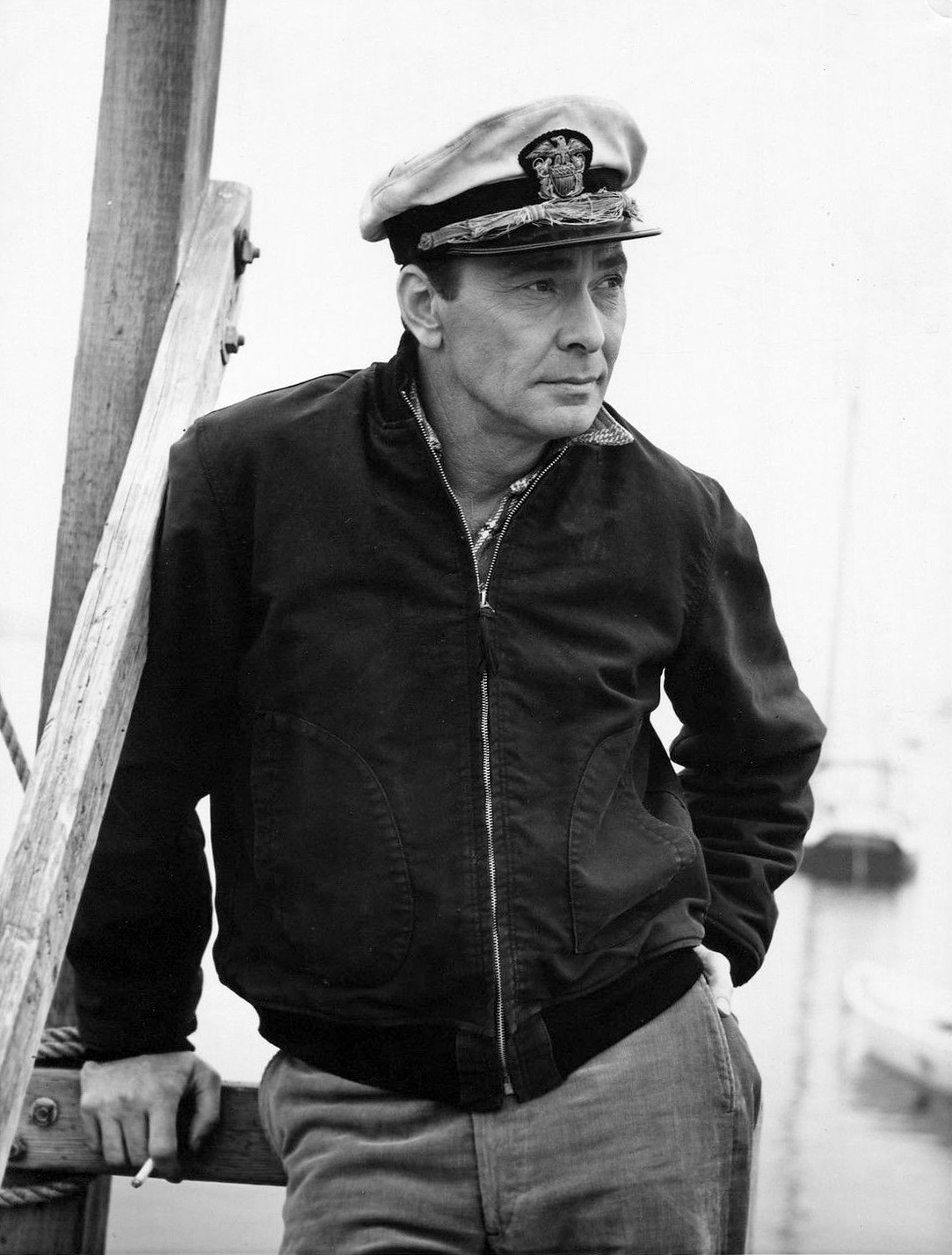
- Barry Sullivan as David Scott, 1957.
- Also known as: Adventure at Scott Island
- Genre: Adventure/Drama
- Directed by: Felix E. Feist; Henry S. Kesler
- Starring: Barry Sullivan; Paul Burke
- Country of origin: United States
- Original language: English
- No. of seasons: 1
- No. of episodes: 25

Production
- Running time: 22–24 minutes
- Production company: Ziv Television Programs

Original release
- Network: CBS (1957–1958); ABC (1958)
- Release: September 26, 1957 – May 25, 1958

Harbourmaster is an American adventure/drama series that ran on CBS from September 26, to December 26, 1957. On January 5, 1958, the series began running on ABC as Adventure at Scott Island, and it ended on June 29, 1958. Harbourmaster was a Ziv production.

Despite the American origin of the show, and its setting in Massachusetts, the initial title of the show used the non-American spelling "Harbourmaster" (with a "u") in order to facilitate international sales of the program.

== Synopsis ==
The R. J. Reynolds Tobacco Company sponsored both versions of the program. Reynolds apparently sought another sponsor to pay for alternate weeks of the CBS broadcasts but ended up as the sole sponsor.

== Notable guest stars ==
- Barbara Bain
- Michael Conrad
- Bruce Gordon
- Larry Hagman
- Luke Halpin
- Will Kuluva
- Martin Landau
- Ruth McDevitt
- Suzanne Pleshette
- Hugh Reilly
- William Smithers
- Jud Taylor
- David White
