= Who Do You Trust? =

American TV game show (1957–1963)

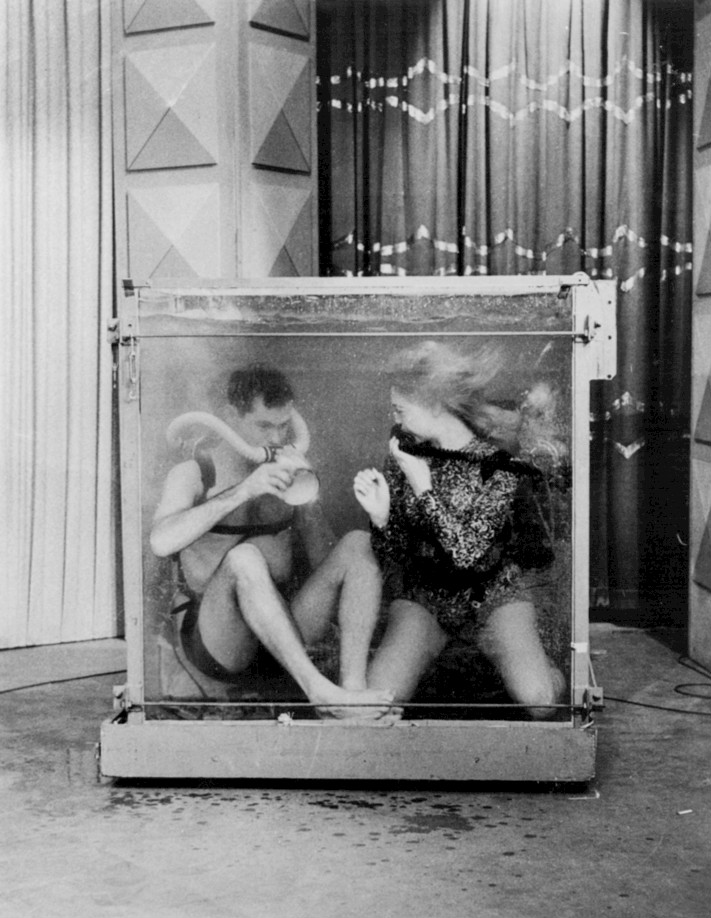
- Johnny Carson and Jane Baldasare in a show stunt, 1961
- Created by: Don Fedderson
- Presented by: Johnny Carson; Woody Woodbury
- Announcer: Bill Nimmo; Ed McMahon
- Country of origin: United States

Production
- Producer: Art Stark
- Running time: 25 minutes (prime-time); 22–24 minutes (daytime)

Original release
- Network: ABC
- Release: September 30, 1957 – December 27, 1963

Who Do You Trust? (originally titled Do You Trust Your Wife? until July 1958) is an American television game show.

Under the title Do You Trust Your Wife?, the show premiered in prime time on CBS in January 1956 and was hosted by Edgar Bergen. The show lasted in this form until March 1957. In September of that year, the show (while keeping the title Do You Trust Your Wife?) was revamped as a daytime program, and Johnny Carson was installed as host. This version aired from September 30, 1957, to November 15, 1957, at 4:30 pm Eastern on ABC, and from November 18, 1957, to December 27, 1963 at 3:30 pm Eastern.

The title was changed to Who Do You Trust? on July 14, 1958.

Carson was host for five years, until he left to take over The Tonight Show in September 1962. He was replaced by Woody Woodbury as host for the show's final 16 months.

== Broadcast history ==
Do You Trust Your Wife?
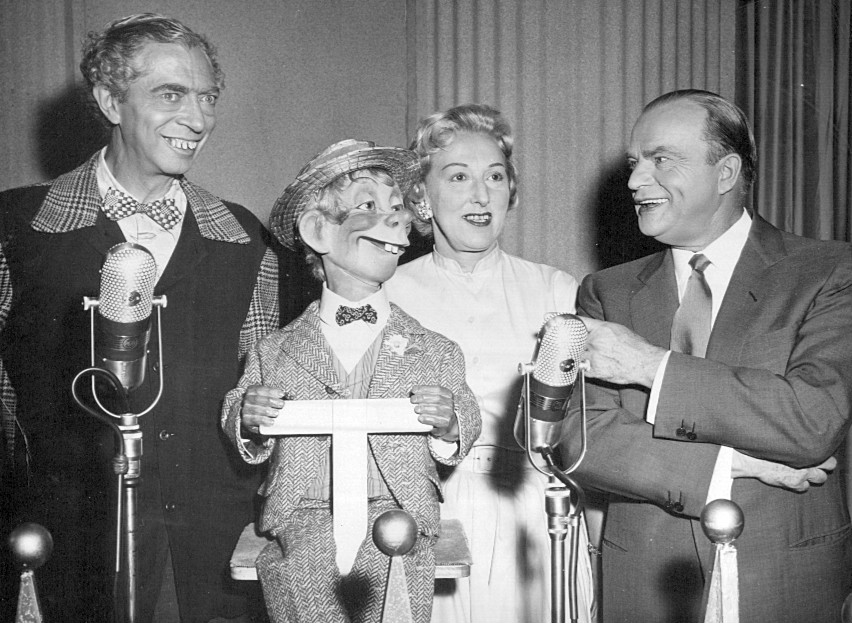
- Edgar Bergen and Mortimer Snerd with a contestant couple, 1956
- Created by: Don Fedderson
- Directed by: Jim Morgan
- Presented by: Edgar Bergen
- Announcer: Ed Reimers; Bob LeMond
- Country of origin: United States

Production
- Executive producer: Fred Henry
- Producers: Don Fedderson; David Lowe
- Running time: 30 minutes

Original release
- Network: CBS
- Release: January 3, 1956 – March 26, 1957

Who Do You Trust? began as a CBS prime time game titled Do You Trust Your Wife?, emceed by ventriloquist Edgar Bergen, which ran from January 3, 1956, to March 26, 1957. On the original show all the contestants were married couples chosen for their unique backgrounds. The show was produced at the Little Theater on 44th Street in New York (today known as the Helen Hayes Theater).

Liggett & Myers Tobacco Company sponsored the program, which was broadcast on Tuesdays from 10:30 to 11 p.m. Eastern Time.

=== Gameplay (Bergen era) ===
After a brief chat with Bergen (and his dummies "Charlie McCarthy", "Mortimer Snerd" and "Effie Klinker") the couples would try to answer four questions. The first was a match question, where the spouses tried to match each other's answer to a question about their married life. The remaining questions were of general knowledge, where after the category was revealed, the husband chose whether to answer himself or "trust" his wife to do so, hence the name of the show. The first correct answer won $100, the second added $200, and the third $300. For the fourth question they could wager any of their winnings by answering a question from one of six categories ranging in value and difficulty from $100 to $600. If the couple won no money, they would answer a very easy $100 question. The couple with the most money competed with the winners from the previous week's show to name as many items as possible in a category with the couple coming up with the most answers receiving $100 a week for a year. Couples could return to the show until defeated; one couple, Erik and Helena Gude, remained on the show long enough to amass $120,800.

=== Change to daytime ===
The prime time version ended in March 1957, but was soon revamped as a daytime show to air on ABC and feature Johnny Carson. In 1957, Carson's career was in serious trouble due to the cancellation of his prime time CBS variety series The Johnny Carson Show. This series immediately launched him into the public consciousness. When the series launched as a daytime show on ABC on September 30, it kept the Do You Trust Your Wife? title until July 1958, changing its title to expand the scope of contestants beyond married couples.

The initial Carson-era shows were announced by Bill Nimmo. A year into the run, Nimmo was replaced by Ed McMahon, and from that point until 1992 Carson and McMahon would spend the majority of their careers together.

==== Gameplay (Carson era) ====
Three couples competed on each show, nearly always a man and a woman chosen for their unique backgrounds; the announcer would introduce couples one at a time, and Carson spent more time interviewing the contestants than quizzing them.

In the quiz portion, Carson would tell the male contestant the category of the upcoming question; the man would then have to decide whether to answer the question himself or "trust" the woman to do so.

Three questions were played per couple, worth $25, $50, and $75; if two or all three couples tied in the cash winnings, they were asked a question involving a numerical answer; the couple coming closest to the correct answer moved on to the bonus game.

===== Bonus round =====
From 1957 until the quiz-show scandals in 1959, the bonus round pitted the day's winners against the winners from the previous day. One partner from each team, usually the man, was placed in an isolation booth and asked a question with several answers. The one who got the most correct answers won $500 and the right to return the following day.

After the scandals, in which Who Do You Trust? was not involved, the bonus round involved the winning couple attempting to unscramble a name or phrase in fifteen seconds.

==== Other show elements ====
One major difference between Carson and NBC's You Bet Your Life host Groucho Marx was that Carson often participated in demonstrations of the contestants' interests or hobbies. On one memorable show he tried his hand at driving a miniature race car (and crashed into a wall), while on another he donned scuba gear and dived into a tank of water. Groucho, on the other hand, almost never left his desk, letting his announcer, George Fenneman, take part in the demonstrations.

As was almost always the case in daytime television programs of the era, including soap operas and even children's shows, all of the background music on Who Do You Trust? was supplied by a single organist, which was John Gart for this series.

When ABC picked up Do You Trust Your Wife?, it created a scheduling conflict with the popular American Bandstand, hosted by Dick Clark, in the afternoon lineup. At the time American Bandstand (which had just premiered) aired for ninety minutes from 3 pm to 4:30 pm daily and was popular enough that ABC did not want to move it out of its timeslot, so a compromise was reached. Do You Trust Your Wife? was placed in the 3:30 pm timeslot that ABC had originally intended for the show, with the remainder of American Bandstand following it at 4 pm. This lasted until 1961, when ABC reduced American Bandstand by thirty minutes and started it immediately after what was now Who Do You Trust?. In Philadelphia, ABC affiliate WFIL-TV, which produced Bandstand continued to air the show locally at 3:30. The station ran Who Do You Trust? on a one-week delay earlier in the afternoon.

=== Woody Woodbury era ===
Carson and McMahon departed after the show of 7 September 1962, when Carson was hired to take over from Jack Paar on NBC's Tonight. Carson and McMahon would spend the next thirty years together as host and sidekick on that show. Meanwhile, Woody Woodbury took over the Who Do You Trust? hosting position while Bill Nimmo, Carson's original announcer in 1957–58, returned to announce.

The series continued with Woodbury and Nimmo until December 27, 1963.

== International versions ==
A British version of Do You Trust Your Wife? was produced by ATV in September 1956 and was hosted by Bob Monkhouse (making this his first time hosting a game show) and Denis Goodwin. The show was based on the Edgar Bergen version and featured a top prize of £2 per week for a whole year (for a grand total of £104). The show was cancelled after one series and replaced with a loose remake called Bury Your Hachet (also hosted by Monkhouse and Goodwin), which proved to be even worse and was gone by the end of 1957.

An Australian version aired in Melbourne from 1957 to 1958 on station GTV-9, at a time when Australian television series often aired in just a single city. Based on the Edgar Bergen version, the Melbourne version was hosted by ventriloquist Ron Blaskett and his three dolls.

Media offices
Preceded by The Johnny Carson Show	Television show hosted by Johnny Carson; 30 September 1957 – 7 September 1962	Succeeded by The Tonight Show Starring Johnny Carson
