= The Big Record =

American TV musical variety series (1957–1958)

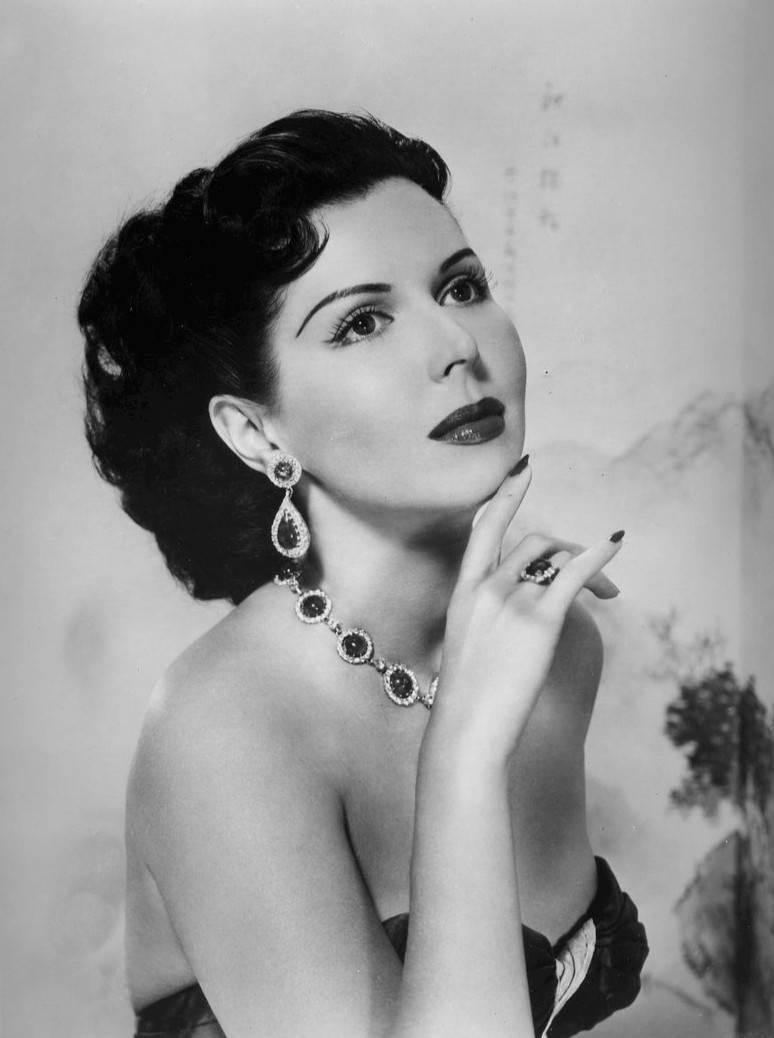
Ann Miller in promotional photo for a 1957 episode

The Big Record is an American television music variety series that aired from September 18, 1957, to June 11, 1958, on CBS. Originally an hour-long show, it was changed to 30 minutes beginning on March 26, 1958. It was hosted by Patti Page, who sang songs and introduced the guest performers. Most of the music was of the pop genre, although other styles of music were also featured, including jazz, rock and roll, and (rarely) country. Professional dancers also sometimes appeared as guests.

In one episode (March 12, 1958), the guests included Pearl Bailey, Hilo Hattie, The Four Voices and Florence Henderson. The series aired live, and kinescoped for west coast broadcast. It was one of the few CBS programs of the 1950s broadcast in color (during an era when arch-rival NBC was regarded as the leader in color telecasts). In the May 21, 1958 episode, guest singer Jo Stafford mentioned the series being broadcast from New York City, and made a topical joke (regarding the baseball Giants and Dodgers relocating to California): "look at it this way, you haven't lost a ball team, you've gained a parking lot."

The Oldsmobile division of General Motors was the main sponsor, and some of the commercials featured Patti Page singing the Oldsmobile jingle. Florence Henderson appeared in some of the filmed ads for the cars. Due to the kinescope technology used to record the shows, a number of episodes with commercials intact still exist. Following the end of the series, Page hosted an additional series for Oldsmobile during the 1958–1959 television season (The Patti Page Oldsmobile Show).

== Production ==
Lester Gottlieb was the executive producer of The Big Record. Vic Schoen and his orchestra provided music on the program.

== Critical response ==
A review of the May 28, 1958, episode in the trade publication Billboard indicated that the program suffered from being unresolved about its format — musical-variety or "Big Record". The review complimented Page: "She looks good, sings even better, and all times is a gracious, lady-like emsee." It noted, however, that of the three guest acts, Vic Damone had "the strongest record name", but his latest hit record had been a year prior to the episode.
