= Dotto =

American game show

- Created by: Al Schwartz & "Snag" Werris
- Presented by: Jack Narz
- Announcer: Ralph Paul
- Country of origin: United States
- Original language: English

Production
- Running time: 30 Minutes

Original release
- Network: CBS (daytime); NBC (primetime)
- Release: January 6 – August 15, 1958

Dotto is a 1958 American television game show that was a combination of a general knowledge quiz and the children's game connect the dots. Jack Narz served as the program's host, with Colgate-Palmolive as its presenting sponsor. Dotto rose to become the highest-rated daytime program in television history, as of 1958.

Dotto replaced Strike It Rich in CBS's 11:30 am daytime time slot on January 6, 1958. In a rare instance of two networks programming the same show, a weekly nighttime edition was launched on July 1, 1958, on CBS's competitor NBC on Tuesday nights in their 9:00 p.m. slot. At the height of both shows' popularity, Dotto was abruptly cancelled without public explanation over the weekend of August 16, 1958. Soon after, Dotto was publicly revealed to have been fixed by its producer, tarnishing the show's reputation and setting the stage for legal and political investigation of the fixing of 1950s quiz shows.

== Game play ==
Two contestants, one a returning champion, competed in each episode of Dotto. The object of the game was to identify the subject of an incomplete portrait drawing, which was accomplished by answering questions and connecting dots. The champion and the challenger were both given their own version of the portrait, which contained fifty dots for each contestant to connect. The contestants were positioned on stage in a manner where neither one could see the other or their progress. There was also an overhead projector on stage that was called the "Dottograph", which would come into play as the game progressed.

Play in each game started with the challenger and he/she was given a category along with a choice of three questions, each with a corresponding number of dots to connect. The questions were worth five, eight, or ten dots and more dots meant a higher difficulty. Answering correctly enabled the challenger to have his/her dots connected, but a wrong answer or failure to answer gave that privilege to the champion. To further assist the contestants in identifying the subjects of the portrait, three clues were provided. These were unlocked once a contestant reached a certain number of connections. The first required a total of twenty-five connections, the second thirty-five, and the last forty-five.

At any point in the game, including during the opposing player's turn, a contestant could signal that he/she knew the portrait's subject by pressing a signaling device. Each contestant's device triggered a different sound, with the challenger's triggering a buzzer and the champion's triggering a bell. Narz would then direct that contestant to walk to the Dottograph, which the opposing player could not see, and write that answer on the projector screen. After the answer was recorded, Narz would reveal if the contestant had answered correctly.

If the contestant did not come up with the correct solution after ringing in, the game ended and the opponent won. If the contestant correctly identified the subject, the opponent was given a last chance to guess based on his/her progress to that point. If the opponent could not, the first contestant won. If the opponent identified the subject, the game ended in a tie and play continued until a winner was determined.

The winning player won money for each unconnected dot left on his/her picture, and the amount increased for each tie up to two. On the daytime series, the payout was $10 per dot and it doubled for each tie up to a maximum of $40. On the nighttime series, the payout was $100 per dot and increased by that amount for each tie, resulting in a maximum of $300 per dot.

After a game was completed, usually during the middle of each episode, a "Home Viewer Dotto" game was played, in which a person selected by postcard drawing was called by telephone live on the air for a chance to guess the person being drawn. If correct, the home viewer won a new car or other valuable prizes, and if incorrect, the viewer received a consolation prize (the daytime version gave away a supply of products advertised by the show's sponsor, Colgate-Palmolive, while the nighttime version gave away a trip). At the end of each episode, additional dots were connected and a clue was displayed for the next episode's "Home Viewer Dotto" game.

== Broadcast history ==
Dotto debuted on January 6, 1958, at 11:30 a.m., replacing the long-running (and controversial) Warren Hull game Strike It Rich. Facing Bob Barker's Truth or Consequences on NBC and local programming on ABC (who had not programmed at 11:30 in three years), within six months Dotto became the highest-rated quiz program of the year, and Narz achieved a popularity equal to that of Hal March on The $64,000 Question.

The show became so popular that on July 1 a weekly nighttime version began on NBC with the same format. On NBC's July 29 episode, a contestant on the show, actress and model Connie Hines had a telegram read on air with Columbia Pictures stating interest in her as an actress. Hines later became famous as Carol Post on the popular comedy Mister Ed.

=== Scandal and cancellation ===
Dotto's downfall began with a backstage discovery in May 1958. A notebook belonging to contestant (and later journalist) Marie Winn was found by stand-by contestant Edward Hilgemeier Jr., who realized that the notebook included questions and answers to be used during Winn's appearances, one of which was against Yaffe Kimball. He tore out the relevant pages of the notebook for himself. Hilgemeier then told Kimball after her onstage loss that her competitor had been given answers in advance. Hilgemeier later reported that Dotto's producers paid him $1,500 to keep quiet about his discovery, and Kimball, as the loser of a fixed match, $4,000. Dotto on CBS, meanwhile, grew in popularity as 1958 went on and became the highest-rated daytime show on the air.

Hilgemeier eventually decided to break his silence. He contacted the Colgate-Palmolive company on approximately August 8, 1958, with his story, which was then relayed to CBS. Executives at CBS and the show's sponsor quickly moved to confirm the allegation internally and worked the issue between August 11 and 16. CBS executive vice president Thomas Fisher tested kinescopes of the show against Winn's notebook and concluded that the show looked fixed. Executives at CBS series met with its creator, Frank Cooper, concerning the potential rigging of the show on the evening of Friday, August 15. Cooper admitted that the show was indeed fixed, and CBS then reported these findings to NBC as the hosts of the nighttime version. Over the weekend of August 16, both the CBS daytime and NBC primetime series were cancelled. In the meantime, in an August 18 affidavit, Hilgemeier complained to the Federal Communications Commission (as he did to Colgate-Palmolive) that Dotto was fixed. In interviews, host Jack Narz stated that he was not notified of Dotto's cancellation until some point after the final episodes had been recorded. Narz was later subpoenaed and took a polygraph test, the results indicating that he was not connected to the fraud.

CBS immediately moved its game show Top Dollar, hosted by Warren Hull, to Dotto's 11:30 a.m. time slot on Monday, August 18. A live studio audience expecting to be seated for Monday's episode of Dotto was instead set up as an audience for Top Dollar. Viewers were greeted by the opening, "Dotto, the program which normally airs at this time, will no longer be seen. Instead ... welcome to Top Dollar!" The final NBC nighttime weekly episode aired on August 12, 1958; the next week its Tuesday time slot was replaced with "a filmed drama series" titled Colgate Theatre, a series of unsold dramatic television pilots sponsored by Colgate-Palmolive. Dotto's cancellation on both CBS and NBC was quickly established as fact on August 18, but the reason for why it was cancelled took days to be confirmed by the media.

=== Aftermath ===
Although it was not the first show to be involved in some wrongdoing, Dotto was the first game show to have such wrongdoing verified. A year earlier, Twenty-One contestant Herb Stempel told the New York Journal-American that his run as champion on the series had been choreographed and that he had been ordered to purposely lose his championship to Charles Van Doren. Stempel's statements gained more credibility once the match fixing at Dotto was publicized, and investigations (in the form of a grand jury, and later, congressional hearings) followed.

Jack Narz eventually replaced Warren Hull as host of Top Dollar by November 1958. That series ran in daytime until October 23, 1959. Narz continued to work as a game show host for most of the next twenty years after Top Dollar ended.

Frank Cooper would never do another game show after Dotto, which was his longest-running game and his only one for CBS. His previous gaming efforts did not fare as well – his first game, an NBC show called Guess What Happened? (dropping the "Guess" after the first show), bombed after three episodes in 1952. Droodles, starring Roger Price, ran for three months in 1954 while ABC's Keep It in the Family ran for four months from 1957 to 1958.

Connie Hines was revealed to have been coached for her Dotto appearance, but unlike Marie Winn, she was not given questions and answers in advance. She enjoyed a five-year run as Carol Post on Mister Ed and, after a few subsequent television guest roles, retired from acting entirely.

Marie Winn eventually became a journalist whose books include The Plug-In Drug, a scathing critique on television's influence over children. The book became somewhat controversial for its author never mentioning her role in one of the medium's greatest scandals.

== International versions ==
A version of Dotto was hugely successful in the United Kingdom, where it ran on ITV from September 13, 1958, to June 23, 1960. This version was first hosted by Robert Gladwell, followed by Jimmy Hanley and then Shaw Taylor. Each winner earned £5 for each unused dot.

=== European revivals ===
In 2013, Belgium's Francophone network RTBF revived the game in digitized form.

In 2014, it was announced that a revival of Dotto for French television was in the works (entitled Fizzio).

== Episode status ==
Although the series was presumably intact in 1958 (see above), the series is believed to have been destroyed sometime afterward as per network practices (and possibly by Colgate's insistence).

Two episodes are known to exist – a daytime episode from May 20 featuring Marie Winn's victory over Yaffe Kimball-Slatin (which was subject to the rigging controversy, see above), and the third-to-last nighttime episode from July 29 featuring Connie Hines.
