= O.S.S. (TV series) =

British TV wartime drama series (1957–1958)

- Also known as: Office of Strategic Services
- Genre: Drama
- Written by: Paul Dudley
- Directed by: Allan Davis; Peter Maxwell; Lawrence Huntington; Pennington Richards; Robert Siodmak
- Starring: Ron Randell; Max Faulkner; Franklyn Fox; Reginald Hearne; Howard Lang
- Country of origin: United Kingdom
- Original language: English
- No. of series: 1
- No. of episodes: 26 (list of episodes)

Production
- Executive producers: Joseph Harris; William Eliscu
- Producer: Jules Buck
- Production companies: Buckeye Productions; ATV

Original release
- Network: ITV
- Release: 14 September 1957 – 9 March 1958

O.S.S. is a wartime television drama series that was co-produced by Buckeye Productions and ATV. It ran for 26 half-hour monochrome episodes during the 1957–1958 season and was distributed by ITC Entertainment and networked in the United States by ABC.

The series followed the adventures of Frank Hawthorne, an agent with the American Office of Strategic Services, who operated behind Nazi lines in occupied France.

== Main cast ==
- Ron Randell as Captain Frank Hawthorn
- Lionel Murton as The Chief
- Robert Gallico as O'Brien

Guest stars included Lois Maxwell, Christopher Lee, Roger Delgado and Enid Lorimer.

== Production ==
The pilot was shot in November 1956. The budget was around $1,200,000.

The star was Australian actor Ron Randell.

In October 1957, Randell injured his hand filming one sequence and required stitches.

== Episode list ==
This episode list is based on the airdate order on ABC, which appears to match the production order and the air-date order for the (unrelated) ABC Weekend TV in the UK.

1. "Operation Fracture"
2. "Operation Tulip"
3. "Operation Powder Puff"
4. "Operation Death Trap"
5. "Operation Orange Blossom"
6. "Operation Pay Day"
7. "Operation Foul Ball"
8. "Operation Blue Eyes"
9. "Operation Flint Axe"
10. "Operation Sweet Talk"
11. "Operation Big House"
12. "Operation Love Bird"
13. "Operation Pigeon Hole"
14. "Operation Yo-yo"
15. "Operation Yodel"
16. "Operation Sardine"
17. "Operation Firefly"
18. "Operation Eel"
19. "Operation Barbecue"
20. "Operation Blackbird"
21. "Operation Post Office"
22. "Operation Newsboy"
23. "Operation Chopping Block"
24. "Operation Dagger" "Operation Buried Alive"
25. "Operation Meatball"
26. "Operation Jingle Bells"
