= The Big Game (American game show) =

- Genre: Game show
- Directed by: Bill Bennington; Dick Weinberg
- Presented by: Tom Kennedy
- Announcer: Wendell Niles; Johnny Jacobs
- Country of origin: United States

Production
- Producer: Jackson Stanley
- Production locations: NBC Studio 4, Burbank, CA
- Running time: approx. 22-26 minutes

Original release
- Network: NBC
- Release: June 13 – September 19, 1958

The Big Game is a game show created by Jackson Stanley Productions, which ran on NBC in prime time from June 13 to September 19, 1958. It was hosted by Tom Kennedy, marking his first national hosting gig. Wendell Niles was the original announcer, later replaced by Johnny Jacobs.

== Game play ==
The game is based on the classic game of Battleship, but with an African safari theme.

Two contestants, or "hunters", competed. Each hunter was given a 5-by-5-square "jungle grid" in which to hide three magnetic "animals": a 2-square-long hippo, a 3-square-long tiger and a 4-square-long alligator. Unlike a traditional Battleship game, animals can be placed on the grid diagonally as well as vertically or horizontally. Each contestant's jungle grid is hidden from view of their opponent.

The host asks various general knowledge questions (most dealing with song titles or spelling), each worth between 3 and 6 "shots" to be taken on the opponent's jungle grid. Hitting all the squares an animal occupied (regardless of size) "knocked out" the animal, earning money for the player. The first "knock out" was worth $100; the second earned an additional $400; and the third earned a further $1500 and the win. The winner received the $2,000 for knocking out all 3 animals, minus the money that the loser earned for knocking out any of the winner's animals. The winner then stays on to face a new opponent.
