= Woody Woodbury =

American comedian, actor and TV personality (born 1924)

- Born: Robert Dennis Woodbury; February 9, 1924 (age 102); Saint Paul, Minnesota, U.S.
- Occupations: Stand-up comedian, actor
- Years active: 1946–present
- Children: 2
- Military career
- Allegiance: United States
- Branch: United States Marine Corps
- Service years: 1942–1958
- Rank: Captain
- Conflicts: World War II; Korean War
- Awards: Air Medal

Robert Dennis "Woody" Woodbury (born February 9, 1924) is an American comedian, actor, television personality and talk show host. He is known for his best-selling comedy albums of risqué stories, most of which were released in the early 1960s. He was among the first standup comedians to receive a gold record.

== Biography ==
Robert Dennis Woodbury was born in Saint Paul, Minnesota, on February 9, 1924. He was a U.S. Marine Corps flight instructor in World War II and the Korean War. Appearing at a night club in Florida, Woodbury met Fletcher Smith, who recorded Woody's material and through his connections in Hollywood led Woodbury to appear in a few films. By 1948, he was working at the Clover Club in Miami. Woodbury's most substantial film role was that of "Uncle Woody" in 1964's For Those Who Think Young (with James Darren, Pamela Tiffin, Tina Louise and Paul Lynde). Among Woodbury's other film appearances: Safe at Home! (with Mickey Mantle and Roger Maris, 1962); Beyond the Bermuda Triangle (TV movie with Fred MacMurray and Donna Mills, 1975); Super Fuzz (with Ernest Borgnine, 1981); and Hardly Working (with Jerry Lewis, 1981).

In 1962, Woodbury replaced Johnny Carson as host of the game show Who Do You Trust? when Carson left to succeed Jack Paar in helming The Tonight Show, a job for which Woodbury had also been competing.

In the mid to late 1960s, Woodbury often performed at Caesars Palace in Las Vegas, touring nationally and performing in charity golf tournaments with Bob Hope, Jackie Gleason and others. He hosted a beauty pageant in West Virginia with Gordon MacRae and Troy Donahue. In the 1970s, Woodbury performed standup comedy, mostly in the Fort Lauderdale, Florida, area, his home base for many years. He performed at the Bahama Hotel.

The Woody Woodbury Show was on television from 1967 to 1968, a 90-minute talk/variety show which aired weekday afternoons in most markets. This lesser-known talk show was repeatedly referenced by comedian Gilbert Gottfried as an in-joke when he would appear on Norm Macdonald’s podcast.

== Personal life ==
By the mid to late 1960s, Woodbury moved from Plantation, Florida to California with his second wife, Sussanne, and their two children, Kimberly and Bobby. In the mid to late 1970s, he divorced his second wife. On August 8, 2019, Woodbury helped to honor Eugene "Gene" Witkowski (1921–2023 ), 97, who served in World War II, who lived in the Fort Lauderdale, Florida area for fifty years.

Woodbury turned 100 on February 9, 2024.

== Discography ==
- Woody Woodbury Looks At Love And Life (1959)
- Woody Woodbury's Laughing Room (1960)
- First Annual Message From The President Of The "Booze Is the Only Answer" Club (1960)
- Woody Woodbury's Concert In Comedy (1961)
- Woody Woodbury's Saloonatics (1961)
- Woody Woodbury In The Spice Is Right (1962)
- The Best Of Woody Woodbury (1963)
- Thru The Keyhole With Woody Woodbury (1964)
- More Of Woody (1973)
- Woody Woodbury's Merriment (2001)
