= Air Power (TV series) =

- Genre: Educational
- Narrated by: Walter Cronkite
- Theme music composer: Norman Dello Joio
- Country of origin: United States
- Original language: English
- No. of seasons: 1
- No. of episodes: 26

Production
- Producers: Perry Wolff; James B. Faichney
- Running time: Episode One 60 mins.; Other episodes 30 mins.

Original release
- Network: CBS
- Release: November 11, 1956 – May 5, 1957

Air Power is a historical educational television series broadcast on CBS from November 11, 1956, until May 5, 1957. In 1958 it was repeated, replacing The Twentieth Century during the summer. It dealt with the rise of aviation as a military weapon. It was produced in cooperation with the United States Air Force. The series also featured a musical score composed by Norman Dello Joio and conducted by Alfredo Antonini.

== Synopsis ==
Air Power told the story of the rise of aviation as a military weapon, covering military aviation history from the invention of the airplane through the supersonic aircraft and missiles of the mid-1950s, and also discussed rockets and the future of aviation. Air Power included the stories of some of the historical heroes of aviation and the leading aviation figures of the mid-20th century.

== Cast ==
Walter Cronkite narrated all 26 episodes. Eddie Rickenbacker co-narrated the November 18, 1956, episode on the early days of aviation. Michael Redgrave co-narrated the December 5, 1956, episode on the Battle of Britain. Art Carney co-narrated the December 12, 1956, episode on stunt flying and wing walking.

== Production ==
The CBS Public Affairs Department produced Air Power in cooperation with the United States Air Force. Norman Dello Joio composed the musical score for the series, and Alfredo Antonini conducted it.

== Broadcast history ==
The series was originally broadcast during the 1956–57 television season on Sunday at 6:30 p.m. Eastern Time from November 11, 1956, to May 5, 1957. Reruns were broadcast from May 4 to October 19, 1958, also at 6:30 p.m. Eastern.

== Episodes ==
No.	Title	Directed by	Written by	Original release date
1	"The Day North America Is Attacked"	Unknown	Unknown	November 11, 1956
The work of the United States Air Force Combat Operations Center in Colorado Springs, Colorado, and of radar stations, fighter-interceptor aircraft, and strategic bombers of the U.S. Air Force Strategic Air Command is depicted as they respond to a simulated enemy attack on North America. Commander-in-chief of the Continental Air Defense Command General Earle E. Partridge, Chief of Staff of the United States Air Force General Nathan Twining, and Twining′s colleagues on the U.S. Joint Chiefs of Staff simulate the activities they would engage in during an actual attack. The only one-hour episode of Air Power.
2	"The Early Days"	Unknown	Unknown	November 18, 1956
Co-narrated by Eddie Rickenbacker, World War I flying ace and owner of Eastern Air Lines. The history of the airplane from its invention in 1903, through its early role as a plaything of rich Europeans, to its history during World War I (1914–1918), when it rapidly grew in capability from a flying observation post to a multimission weapon of war. The episode includes pre-World War I footage of aviation pioneers such as the Wright Brothers, Glenn Curtiss, and Anthony Fokker and wartime footage of World War I flying aces Manfred von Richthofen, Hermann Göring, Georges Guynemer, Charles Nungesser, and Rickenbacker.
3	"The Luftwaffe"	Unknown	Unknown	November 25, 1956
The rise of the German Luftwaffe, told with the use of German film captured during World War II.
4	"Pearl Harbor"	Unknown	Unknown	December 2, 1956
The story of the Japanese attack on Pearl Harbor, Hawaii, on December 7, 1941, which brought the United States into World War II. The episode uses Japanese film captured during the war to depict Japanese preparations for the attack and the attack itself.
5	"The Battle of Britain"	Unknown	Unknown	December 9, 1956
Co-narrated by Michael Redgrave. The story of the World War II Battle of Britain in the summer of 1940, in which the British Royal Air Force defeated the German Luftwaffe′s campaign to gain air superiority over the United Kingdom and prevented Operation Sea Lion, Nazi Germany′s planned invasion of the United Kingdom, from taking place.
6	"Counterblast"	Unknown	Perry Wolff	December 16, 1956
How the British Royal Air Force mounted a counterattack against Nazi Germany during World War II even while the United Kingdom was under attack by German bombers. The episode includes depictions of British air raids on Hamburg.
7	"Fools, Daredevils and Geniuses"	Unknown	Unknown	December 23, 1956
Co-narrated by Art Carney. A look at aviation during the 1920s, including stunt flying, wing walking, and barnstorming.
8	"The 1930s"	Unknown	Unknown	December 30, 1956
Lieutenant General James Doolittle hosts the episode, which covers major events of the 1930s: the Great Depression in the United States, the rise to power of Adolf Hitler in Germany and Benito Mussolini in Italy, the development of the United States Army Air Corps and of the Boeing B-17 Flying Fortress strategic bomber, and how aviation made it impossible for the United States to continue its policy of isoationism.
9	"Target Ploesti"	Unknown	Unknown	January 6, 1957
The United States Army Air Forces bomb oil refineries around Ploești, Romania, as part of the oil campaign of World War II.
10	"Schweinfurt"	Unknown	Unknown	January 13, 1957
U.S. Army Air Forces bombers attack Schweinfurt, Germany, in an attempt to cripple the German ball bearing industry during World War II.
11	"Conquest of the Air"	Unknown	Unknown	January 20, 1957
The story of the U.S. Army Air Forces North American P-51 Mustang, the high-performance long-range fighter that played the major role in giving the Allies air superiority over Germany during World War II.
12	"The Japanese Perimeter"	Unknown	Unknown	January 27, 1957
At the outset of the Pacific campaign of World War II, Japanese forces sweep through the Philippines, British Malaya, Singapore, and the Netherlands East Indies between December 1941 and May 1942, but their offensive finally ends in defeat at the hands of United States Navy aircraft carrier forces in the Battle of Midway in June 1942.
13	"Interdiction and Blockade"	Unknown	Unknown	February 3, 1957
Allied and Japanese forces fight in the New Guinea campaign and the Battle of the Bismarck Sea during World War II.
14	"Operation Strangle"	Unknown	Unknown	February 10, 1957
In the spring of 1944 during the Italian campaign of World War II, Allied air forces interdict German supply lines in Italy in Operation Strangle as Allied ground forces attack the German Gustav Line, fight the Battle of Monte Cassino, and liberate Rome.
15	"Pacific Patterns"	Unknown	Unknown	February 17, 1957
In late 1943 and early 1944, United States Navy aircraft carriers go on the offensive against the Japanese during the Pacific campaign of World War II, operating in support of U.S. forces during the Gilbert and Marshall Islands campaign — the seizure of Tarawa and other atolls in the Gilbert and Marshall Islands — and launching a major air attack against the Japanese base at Truk.
16	"Advance the Bomber Line"	Unknown	Unknown	February 24, 1957
To secure bases for U.S. Army Air Forces Boeing B-29 Superfortress strategic bombers within range of the Japanese Home Islands, U.S. forces invade the Mariana Islands in the summer of 1944.
17	"The Winning of France"	Unknown	Unknown	March 3, 1957
The story of air power's role in the destruction of the German 7th Army in France in the summer of 1944 in World War II′s Operation Cobra and Battle of the Falaise Pocket.
18	"Superfort"	Unknown	Unknown	March 10, 1957
In World War II′s Battle of Iwo Jima in February–March 1945, United States Marine Corps forces seize Iwo Jima from the Japanese to secure a base from which U.S. Army Air Forces fighters can reach the Japanese Home Islands and on which damaged U.S. Army Air Forces Boeing B-29 Superfortress bombers can land if unable to reach their bases in the Mariana Islands.
19	"Victory in Europe"	Unknown	Unknown	March 17, 1957
The last stages of World War II in Europe in the winter and spring of 1945, as Soviet forces capture Berlin, Soviet and Western Allied forces meet at the Elbe, and Germany is left in ruins.
20	"Kamikaze"	Unknown	Unknown	March 24, 1957
Between October 1944 and August 1945, Japanese aircraft make kamikaze suicide attacks against Allied ships.
21	"Defeat of Japan"	Unknown	Unknown	March 31, 1957
The story of the top-secret production of the U.S. atomic bomb and its use against the Japanese cities of Hiroshima and Nagasaki, leading to the surrender of Japan that ended World War II.
22	"The Cold Decade: Airlift"	Unknown	Unknown	April 7, 1957
As the Cold War begins after the end of World War II, the Soviet Union institutes the Berlin Blockade of West Berlin, prompting the Western Allies to conduct the Berlin Airlift of 1948–1949.
23	"The Cold Decade: To the Yalu"	Unknown	Unknown	April 14, 1957
After the Korean War breaks out in June 1950, United Nations and South Korean forces are pushed back, then regain the initiative and drive North Korean forces all the way back to the Yalu River along the border with the People's Republic of China.
24	"The Cold Decade: Korean Stalemate"	Unknown	Unknown	April 21, 1957
The People's Republic of China intervenes in the Korean War in November 1950 and pushes United Nations forces back, resulting a lengthy stalemate along the border between North Korea and South Korea. Meanwhile air battles between American and Soviet jets begin over the Korean Peninsula. Ultimately, the opposing sides agree to a ceasefire in July 1953.
25	"Starfighter"	Unknown	Unknown	April 28, 1957
The story of the design and testing of the Lockheed F-104 Starfighter supersonic interceptor.
26	"The New Doctrine"	Unknown	Unknown	May 5, 1957
The new concepts of future warfare, in which U.S. and Soviet Air Force planes will carry atomic bombs and hydrogen bombs if a war breaks out between them, and both sides will engage in new kinds of guided-missile warfare.
