= 1957–58 United States network television schedule (late night) =

These are the late night Monday–Friday schedules for the three networks for the 1957–58 season. All times are Eastern and Pacific.

Talk shows are highlighted in yellow, local programming is white.

Jack Paar took over NBC's late night show on July 29, 1957. He was offered the spot permanently after pulling in more mail than any other comedian who appeared as guest host after the departure of Steve Allen. On the East Coast, the show was available for broadcast from 11:15 PM to 1:00 AM.

== Schedule ==
	11:00 PM	11:30 PM	12:00 AM	12:30 AM	1:00 AM	1:30 AM	2:00 AM	2:30 AM	3:00 AM	3:30 AM	4:00 AM	4:30 PM	5:00 AM	5:30 AM
ABC	local programming or sign-off
CBS	local programming or sign-off
NBC	11:15 PM: Tonight Starring Jack Paar				local programming or sign-off
