= Keep It in the Family (American game show) =

American TV game show (1957–1958)

- Genre: Game show
- Created by: Leonard Stern; Roger Price
- Directed by: Mickey Trenner
- Presented by: Bill Nimmo
- Announcer: Johnny Olson
- Country of origin: United States

Production
- Producer: Art Stark
- Running time: 30 minutes
- Production company: Frank Cooper Productions

Original release
- Network: ABC
- Release: October 12, 1957 – February 8, 1958

Related
- Family Feud

Keep It in the Family is an American television game show hosted by Bill Nimmo (Keefe Brasselle hosted the first broadcast) and announced by Johnny Olson which ran on ABC from October 12, 1957, to February 8, 1958.

Broadcast on Saturdays from 7:30 to 8 p.m. Eastern Time, the series was created by Leonard Stern and Roger Price and was produced by Frank Cooper Productions. It was replaced by Dick Clark's Beechnut Show, which ran until 1960.

== Gameplay ==
The game involved two five-member teams of families, each starting the game with 200 points. In each round, the teams were shown a prize, after which they were given a category and then alternated bidding for control. The difficulty of the question also increased with the amount of the bid. Bidding was played as an auction until one team either challenged their opponents or bid the 100 point maximum.

The winning bid team was then asked a five-part question, with the youngest members generally getting the easier question parts and the older members getting the difficult parts. When a family answered all five parts of the question correctly, they received the amount of their bid plus the prize; if, however, a team missed any part of the question, the amount of their bid was deducted from their score.

The game continued until one team scored 350 points and won the game. However, if a team's score fell below 100 points, that team automatically lost. The winners then faced a new family. Regardless of the outcome, all teams kept whatever prizes they won during their stay.

== Episode status ==
The series is believed to have been destroyed as per network practices of the era. Only the premiere is known to exist and has been seen on the internet.

== Foreign version ==
In the United Kingdom, a version was broadcast on ITV in 1958. The host for this version was actor Bill Owen.
