= Pabst Blue Ribbon Bouts =

- Also known as: The Wednesday Night Fights
- Genre: Sports
- Presented by: Russ Hodges / Jack Drees / Bill Nimmo
- Theme music composer: Bill Gale
- Opening theme: "What'll You Have? (Pabst Blue Ribbon)"
- Country of origin: United States
- Original language: English

Original release
- Network: CBS (1948-1955) ABC (1955-1960)
- Release: 1948 – 1960

Related
- re-run under title Blue Ribbon Classics

Pabst Blue Ribbon Bouts, later The Wednesday Night Fights, is a television program that broadcast boxing matches from New York's Madison Square Garden featuring Russ Hodges, Jack Drees, and Bill Nimmo. It finished at #26 for the 1950-1951 season in the Nielsen ratings, followed by #17 in 1951-1952, #14 in 1952-1953, #23 in 1953-1954 and #25 in 1954-1955. After its cancellation on CBS, the series was picked up by ABC, renamed The Wednesday Night Fights, and continued until 1960.

Kinescopes of some of these matches were later re-broadcast under the title Blue Ribbon Classics. In recent years, ESPN Classic has aired some of the bouts. Most Pabst Blue Ribbon fights can be viewed at TVS Classic Sports Network.Com.

During the 1954-55 season, this show was pre-empted every fourth week by The Best of Broadway, which ran a total of nine episodes for the season.
