= 1954–55 United States network television schedule (daytime) =

The following is the 1954–55 daytime network television schedule for the three major English-language commercial broadcast networks in the United States. It covers the weekday daytime hours from September 1954 to August 1955.

Talk shows are highlighted in yellow, local programming is white, reruns of prime-time programming are orange, game shows are pink, soap operas are chartreuse, news programs are gold and all others are light blue. New series are highlighted in bold.

== Fall 1954 ==
	7:00 am	7:30 am	8:00 am	8:30 am	9:00 am	9:30 am	10:00 am	10:30 am	11:00 am	11:30 am	noon	12:30 pm	1:00 pm	1:30 pm	2:00 pm	2:30 pm	3:00 pm	3:30 pm	4:00 pm	4:30 pm	5:00 pm	5:30 pm
ABC	local programming				Don McNeill's Breakfast Club		local programming		**Creative Cookery**		local programming
CBS	The Morning Show				local programming		The Garry Moore Show (M-Th, to 11:30 F)	Arthur Godfrey Time (M-Th) / The Garry Moore Show (F)		Strike It Rich	12:00 Valiant Lady 12:15 Love of Life	12:30 Search for Tomorrow 12:45 The Guiding Light	1:00 Portia Faces Life 1:15 The Seeking Heart	Welcome Travelers	Robert Q. Lewis Show	Art Linkletter's House Party	The Big Payoff	Bob Crosby Show	4:00 The Brighter Day 4:15 The Secret Storm	On Your Account	The U.N. In Action / 5:00 Barker Bill's Cartoon Show 5:15 The U.N. In Action (W/F)	local programming
NBC	The Today Show starring Dave Garroway				local programming		Ding Dong School	10:30: A Time to Live 10:45: Three Steps to Heaven	The Home Show		The Betty White Show	**Feather Your Nest**	local programming				3:00 The Greatest Gift 3:15 Golden Windows	3:30 One Man's Family 3:45 Concerning Miss Marlowe	4:00 Hawkins Falls 4:15 First Love	4:30 **The World of Mr. Sweeney** 4:45 **Modern Romances**	The Pinky Lee Show	Howdy Doody

== Winter 1954-1955 ==
	7:00 am	7:30 am	8:00 am	8:30 am	9:00 am	9:30 am	10:00 am	10:30 am	11:00 am	11:30 am	noon	12:30 pm	1:00 pm	1:30 pm	2:00 pm	2:30 pm	3:00 pm	3:30 pm	4:00 pm	4:30 pm	5:00 pm	5:30 pm
ABC	local programming				Don McNeill's Breakfast Club (until 2/25)		local programming		Creative Cookery (until 2/25)		local programming
CBS	The Morning Show				local programming		The Garry Moore Show (M-Th, to 11:30 F)	Arthur Godfrey Time (M-Th) / The Garry Moore Show (F)		Strike It Rich	12:00 Valiant Lady 12:15 Love of Life	12:30 Search for Tomorrow 12:45 The Guiding Light	1:00 Portia Faces Life 1:15 **The Road Of Life**	Welcome Travelers	Robert Q. Lewis Show	Art Linkletter's House Party	The Big Payoff	Bob Crosby Show	4:00 The Brighter Day 4:15 The Secret Storm	On Your Account	5:00 Barker Bill's Cartoon Show (W/F) 5:15 local programming	local programming
NBC	The Today Show starring Dave Garroway				local programming		Ding Dong School	10:30: **Way of the World** 10:45: **Hollywood Today with Sheilah Graham**	The Home Show		**The Tennessee Ernie Ford Show**	Feather Your Nest	local programming				3:00 The Greatest Gift 3:15 Golden Windows	3:30 One Man's Family 3:45 Concerning Miss Marlowe	4:00 Hawkins Falls 4:15 First Love	4:30 The World of Mr. Sweeney 4:45 Modern Romances	The Pinky Lee Show	Howdy Doody

== Spring 1955 ==
	7:00 am	7:30 am	8:00 am	8:30 am	9:00 am	9:30 am	10:00 am	10:30 am	11:00 am	11:30 am	noon	12:30 pm	1:00 pm	1:30 pm	2:00 pm	2:30 pm	3:00 pm	3:30 pm	4:00 pm	4:30 pm	5:00 pm	5:30 pm
ABC	local programming
CBS	The Morning Show				local programming		The Garry Moore Show (M-Th, to 11:30 F)	Arthur Godfrey Time (M-Th) / The Garry Moore Show (F)		Strike It Rich	12:00 Valiant Lady 12:15 Love of Life	12:30 Search for Tomorrow 12:45 The Guiding Light	1:00 The Inner Flame* 1:15 The Road Of Life	Welcome Travelers	Robert Q. Lewis Show	Art Linkletter's House Party	The Big Payoff	Bob Crosby Show	4:00 The Brighter Day 4:15 The Secret Storm	On Your Account	5:00 Barker Bill's Cartoon Show (W/F) 5:15 local programming	local programming
NBC	The Today Show starring Dave Garroway				local programming		Ding Dong School	10:30: Way of the World 10:45: Hollywood Today with Sheilah Graham	The Home Show		The Tennessee Ernie Ford Show	Feather Your Nest	local programming				**Ted Mack Matinee**	3:30 The Greatest Gift 3:45 Golden Windows	4:00 Hawkins Falls 4:15 First Love	4:30 The World of Mr. Sweeney 4:45 Modern Romances	The Pinky Lee Show	Howdy Doody

- formerly Portia Faces Life

== Summer 1955 ==
	7:00 am	7:30 am	8:00 am	8:30 am	9:00 am	9:30 am	10:00 am	10:30 am	11:00 am	11:30 am	noon	12:30 pm	1:00 pm	1:30 pm	2:00 pm	2:30 pm	3:00 pm	3:30 pm	4:00 pm	4:30 pm	5:00 pm	5:30 pm
ABC	local programming
CBS	The Morning Show				local programming		The Garry Moore Show (M-Th, to 11:30 F)	Arthur Godfrey Time (M-Th) / The Garry Moore Show (F)		Strike It Rich	12:00 Valiant Lady 12:15 Love of Life	12:30 Search for Tomorrow 12:45 The Guiding Light	**Jack Paar Show**	Welcome Travelers	Robert Q. Lewis Show	Art Linkletter's House Party	The Big Payoff	Bob Crosby Show	4:00 The Brighter Day 4:15 The Secret Storm	On Your Account	5:00 Barker Bill's Cartoon Show (W/F) 5:15 local programming	local programming
NBC	The Today Show starring Dave Garroway				local programming		Ding Dong School	10:30 **Parent's Time** 10:45 Hollywood Today with Sheila Graham	The Home Show		The Tennessee Ernie Ford Show	Feather Your Nest	local programming				Ted Mack Matinee	**It Pays to Be Married**	4:00 Way of the World 4:15 First Love	4:30 The World of Mr. Sweeney 4:45 Modern Romances	The Pinky Lee Show	Howdy Doody

== By network ==
=== ABC ===
**Returning Series**

- Don McNeill's Breakfast Club

**New Series**

- **Creative Cookery**

**Not Returning From 1953-54**

- **The Ern Westmore Show**
- **The Jerry Lester Show**
- **Turn to a Friend**

=== CBS ===
**Returning Series**

- Barker Bill's Cartoon Show
- The Brighter Day
- Art Linkletter's House Party
- Arthur Godfrey Time
- The Big Payoff
- The Bob Crosby Show
- Double or Nothing
- The Garry Moore Show
- The Guiding Light
- Love of Life
- The Morning Show
- On Your Account (moved from NBC)
- Portia Faces Life
- Robert Q. Lewis Show
- Search for Tomorrow
- The Secret Storm
- The Seeking Heart
- Strike It Rich
- The U.N. in Action
- Valiant Lady

**New Series**

- **The Jack Paar Show**

**Not Returning From 1953-54**

- Action in the Afternoon
- Double or Nothing
- I'll Buy That
- The Jack Paar Show
- Journey Through Life
- Rod Brown of the Rocket Rangers
- Wheel of Fortune
- Woman with a Past

=== NBC ===
**Returning Series**

- The Betty White Show
- Ding Dong School
- First Love
- Golden Windows
- Hawkins Falls, Population 6200
- The Home Show
- Howdy Doody
- One Man's Family
- Pinky Lee Show
- Three Steps to Heaven
- The Today Show
- A Time to Live
- Welcome Travelers

**New Series**

- **Concerning Miss Marlowe**
- **Feather Your Nest**
- **The Greatest Gift**
- **Hollywood Today with Sheilah Graham**
- **It Pays to Be Married**
- **Modern Romances**
- **Parent's Time**
- **Ted Mack Matinee**
- **The Tennessee Ernie Ford Show**
- **Way of the World**
- **The World of Mr. Sweeney**

**Not Returning From 1953-54**

- Ask Washington
- Atom Squad
- The Bennetts
- Breakfast in Hollywood
- Break the Bank
- Bride and Groom
- Follow Your Heart
- The Gabby Hayes Show
- Glamour Girl
- The Kate Smith Hour
- Ladies Choice
- On Your Account (moved to CBS)

== See also ==
- 1954-55 United States network television schedule (prime-time)
- 1954-55 United States network television schedule (late night)

== Sources ==
- https://web.archive.org/web/20071015122215/http://curtalliaume.com/abc_day.html
- https://web.archive.org/web/20071015122235/http://curtalliaume.com/cbs_day.html
- https://web.archive.org/web/20071012211242/http://curtalliaume.com/nbc_day.html
- Castleman & Podrazik, The TV Schedule Book, McGraw-Hill Paperbacks, 1984
- Hyatt, The Encyclopedia Of Daytime Television, Billboard Books, 1997
- TV schedule pages, New York Times, September 1954 – September 1955 (microfilm)
