= 1955–56 United States network television schedule (daytime) =

The following is the 1955–56 daytime network television schedule for the three major English-language commercial broadcast networks in the United States. It covers the weekday daytime hours from September 1955 to August 1956.

Talk shows are highlighted in yellow, local programming is white, reruns of prime-time programming are orange, game shows are pink, soap operas are chartreuse, news programs are gold and all others are light blue. New series are highlighted in bold.

== Fall 1955 ==
	7:00 am	7:30 am	8:00 am	8:30 am	9:00 am	9:30 am	10:00 am	10:30 am	11:00 am	11:30 am	noon	12:30 pm	1:00 pm	1:30 pm	2:00 pm	2:30 pm	3:00 pm	3:30 pm	4:00 pm	4:30 pm	5:00 pm	5:30 pm
ABC	local programming																				**The Mickey Mouse Club**
CBS	The Morning Show		**Captain Kangaroo**		local programming		The Garry Moore Show (M-Th, to 11:30 F)	Arthur Godfrey Time (M-Th) / The Garry Moore Show (F)		Strike It Rich	12:00 Valiant Lady 12:15 Love of Life	12:30 Search for Tomorrow 12:45 The Guiding Light	Jack Paar Show	**Love Story***	Robert Q. Lewis Show	Art Linkletter's House Party	The Big Payoff	The Bob Crosby Show	4:00 The Brighter Day 4:15 The Secret Storm	On Your Account	5:00 Barker Bill's Cartoon Show (W/F) 5:15 local programming	local programming
NBC	The Today Show				local programming		Ding Dong School	The Ernie Kovacs Show	The Home Show		The Tennessee Ernie Ford Show	Feather Your Nest	local programming				**Matinee Theater** (most presentations in color)		4:00 **A Date With Life** 4:15 First Love	4:30 The World of Mr. Sweeney 4:45 Modern Romances	Pinky Lee Circus Time	Howdy Doody

- formerly Welcome Travelers

== Winter 1955/1956 ==
	7:00 am	7:30 am	8:00 am	8:30 am	9:00 am	9:30 am	10:00 am	10:30 am	11:00 am	11:30 am	noon	12:30 pm	1:00 pm	1:30 pm	2:00 pm	2:30 pm	3:00 pm	3:30 pm	4:00 pm	4:30 pm	5:00 pm	5:30 pm
ABC	local programming																**Afternoon Film Festival**				The Mickey Mouse Club
CBS	**Good Morning!***		Captain Kangaroo		local programming		The Garry Moore Show (M-Th, to 11:30 F)	Arthur Godfrey Time (M-Th) / The Garry Moore Show (F)		Strike It Rich	12:00 Valiant Lady 12:15 Love of Life	12:30 Search for Tomorrow 12:45 The Guiding Light	Jack Paar Show	Love Story	Robert Q. Lewis Show	Art Linkletter's House Party	The Big Payoff	Bob Crosby Show	4:00 The Brighter Day 4:15 The Secret Storm	On Your Account	local programming
NBC	The Today Show				local programming		Ding Dong School	The Ernie Kovacs Show	The Home Show		The Tennessee Ernie Ford Show	Feather Your Nest	local programming				Matinee Theater (most presentations in color)		4:00 A Date With Life 4:15 Modern Romances	**Queen for a Day**	Pinky Lee Circus Time	Howdy Doody (in color beginning September 12)

- formerly The Morning Show

== Spring 1956 ==
	7:00 am	7:30 am	8:00 am	8:30 am	9:00 am	9:30 am	10:00 am	10:30 am	11:00 am	11:30 am	noon	12:30 pm	1:00 pm	1:30 pm	2:00 pm	2:30 pm	3:00 pm	3:30 pm	4:00 pm	4:30 pm	5:00 pm	5:30 pm
ABC	local programming																Afternoon Film Festival				The Mickey Mouse Club
CBS	Good Morning!		Captain Kangaroo		local programming		The Garry Moore Show (M-Th, to 11:30 F)	Arthur Godfrey Time (M-Th) / The Garry Moore Show (F)		Strike It Rich	12:00 Valiant Lady 12:15 Love of Life	12:30 Search for Tomorrow 12:45 The Guiding Light	Jack Paar Show	**As the World Turns**	Robert Q. Lewis Show	Art Linkletter's House Party	The Big Payoff	Bob Crosby Show	4:00 The Brighter Day 4:15 The Secret Storm	**The Edge of Night**	local programming
NBC	The Today Show				local programming		Ding Dong School	The Ernie Kovacs Show	The Home Show		The Tennessee Ernie Ford Show	Feather Your Nest	local programming				Matinee Theater (most presentations in color)		4:00 A Date With Life 4:15 Modern Romances	Queen for a Day	Pinky Lee Circus Time	Howdy Doody (in color)

== Summer 1956 ==
	7:00 am	7:30 am	8:00 am	8:30 am	9:00 am	9:30 am	10:00 am	10:30 am	11:00 am	11:30 am	noon	12:30 pm	1:00 pm	1:30 pm	2:00 pm	2:30 pm	3:00 pm	3:30 pm	4:00 pm	4:30 pm	5:00 pm	5:30 pm
ABC	local programming																Afternoon Film Festival				The Mickey Mouse Club
CBS	Good Morning!		Captain Kangaroo		local programming		The Garry Moore Show (M-Th, to 11:30 F)	Arthur Godfrey Time (M-Th) / The Garry Moore Show (F)		Strike It Rich	12:00 Valiant Lady 12:15 Love of Life	12:30 Search for Tomorrow 12:45 The Guiding Light	1:00 CBS News/1:10 **Stand Up and Be Counted**	As the World Turns	**The Johnny Carson Show**	Art Linkletter's House Party	The Big Payoff	Bob Crosby Show	4:00 The Brighter Day 4:15 The Secret Storm	The Edge of Night	local programming
NBC	The Today Show				local programming		Ding Dong School	**NBC Bandstand**	The Home Show		**Tic-Tac-Dough**	**It Could Be You**	local programming			The Tennessee Ernie Ford Show	Matinee Theater (most presentations in color)		4:00 Queen for a Day 4:45 Modern Romances (soap)		**Comedy Time*** (repeats)	local programming

- Comedy Time featured repeats of I Married Joan, So This Is Hollywood and It's Always Jan.

== By network ==
=== ABC ===
**New Series**

- **Afternoon Film Festival**
- **The Mickey Mouse Club**

**Not Returning From 1954-55**

- Creative Cookery
- Don McNeill's Breakfast Club

=== CBS ===
**Returning Series**

- Barker Bill's Cartoon Show
- The Brighter Day
- Art Linkletter's House Party
- Arthur Godfrey Time
- The Big Payoff
- The Bob Crosby Show
- CBS News
- The Garry Moore Show
- The Guiding Light
- The Jack Paar Show
- Love of Life
- The Morning Show
- On Your Account
- Robert Q. Lewis Show
- Search for Tomorrow
- The Secret Storm
- Strike It Rich
- Valiant Lady

**New Series**

- **As the World Turns**
- **Captain Kangaroo**
- **The Edge of Night**
- **The Johnny Carson Show**
- **Good Morning!**
- **Love Story**
- **Stand Up and Be Counted**

**Not Returning From 1954-55**

- Portia Faces Life
- The Road Of Life
- The Seeking Heart
- The U.N. In Action
- Welcome Travelers

=== NBC ===
**Returning Series**

- Ding Dong School
- The Ernie Kovacs Show
- Feather Your Nest
- First Love
- The Home Show
- Howdy Doody
- Modern Romances
- Pinky Lee Show
- The Tennessee Ernie Ford Show
- The Today Show
- The World of Mr. Sweeney

**New Series**

- **A Date With Life**
- **Comedy Time**
- **It Could Be You**
- **Matinee Theater**
- **NBC Bandstand**
- **Tic-Tac-Dough**
- **Queen for a Day**

**Not Returning From 1954-55**

- A Time to Live
- The Betty White Show
- Break the Bank
- Concerning Miss Marlowe
- The Greatest Gift
- Golden Windows
- Hawkins Falls
- Hollywood Today with Sheilah Graham
- It Pays to Be Married
- One Man's Family
- Parent's Time
- Ted Mack Matinee
- Three Steps to Heaven
- Way of the World

== See also ==
- 1955-56 United States network television schedule (prime-time)
- 1955-56 United States network television schedule (late night)

== Sources ==
- https://web.archive.org/web/20071015122215/http://curtalliaume.com/abc_day.html
- https://web.archive.org/web/20071015122235/http://curtalliaume.com/cbs_day.html
- https://web.archive.org/web/20071012211242/http://curtalliaume.com/nbc_day.html
- Castleman & Podrazik, The TV Schedule Book, McGraw-Hill Paperbacks, 1984
- Hyatt, The Encyclopedia Of Daytime Television, Billboard Books, 1997
- TV schedules, New York Times, September 1955 – September 1956 (microfilm)
