= 1953–54 United States network television schedule (daytime) =

The following is the 1953–54 daytime network television schedule for the three major English-language commercial broadcast networks in the United States. It covers the weekday daytime hours from September 1953 to August 1954.

== Legend ==
Yellow indicates talk shows.
White indicates local programming.
Orange indicates reruns of prime-time programming.
Pink indicates game shows.
Chartreuse indicates soap operas.
Gold indicates news programs
Light blue indicates all others.
- New series are highlighted in **bold**.

== Fall 1953 ==
	7:00 am	7:30 am	8:00 am	8:30 am	9:00 am	9:30 am	10:00 am	10:30 am	11:00 am	11:30 am	noon	12:30 pm	1:00 pm	1:30 pm	2:00 pm	2:30 pm	3:00 pm	3:30 pm	4:00 pm	4:30 pm	5:00 pm	5:30 pm
ABC	local programming																**The Jerry Lester Show**		**Turn to a Friend**	**The Ern Westmore Show**	local programming	
CBS	local programming						Arthur Godfrey Time (Mon-Thu) / 10:00 Wheel of Fortune 11:00 I'll Buy That (F)			Strike It Rich (Mon-Fri) / Rod Brown of the Rocket Rangers (Sat)	12:00 **Valiant Lady** 12:15 Love of Life	12:30 Search for Tomorrow 12:45 The Guiding Light	Journey Through Life	The Garry Moore Show	Double or Nothing (Mon/Wed/Fri) / I'll Buy That (Tue/Thu)	Art Linkletter's House Party	The Big Payoff	The Bob Crosby Show	Action in the Afternoon	The U.N. In Action	local programming	
NBC	The Today Show				local programming		Ding Dong School	Glamour Girl	11:00 am: Hawkins Falls; 11:15 am: **The Bennetts**	11:30 am: **Three Steps to Heaven**; 11:45 am: **Follow Your Heart**	local programming						**The Kate Smith Hour**		Welcome Travelers	On Your Account	5:00 pm: Atom Squad 5:15 pm: The Gabby Hayes Show	Howdy Doody

== Winter 1953/1954 ==
	7:00 am	7:30 am	8:00 am	8:30 am	9:00 am	9:30 am	10:00 am	10:30 am	11:00 am	11:30 am	noon	12:30 pm	1:00 pm	1:30 pm	2:00 pm	2:30 pm	3:00 pm	3:30 pm	4:00 pm	4:30 pm	5:00 pm	5:30 pm
ABC	local programming				**Don McNeill's Breakfast Club** (since 2/22)		local programming										The Jerry Lester Show		local programming			
CBS	local programming						Arthur Godfrey Time (Mon-Thu) / 10:00 **The Jack Paar Show** 11:00 I'll Buy That (F)			Strike It Rich (Mon-Fri) / Rod Brown of the Rocket Rangers (Sat)	12:00 Valiant Lady 12:15 Love of Life	12:30 Search for Tomorrow 12:45 The Guiding Light	1:00 **The Brighter Day** 1:15 Journey Through Life	The Garry Moore Show (Tue/Thu, 1:30-2:30)	Double or Nothing (Mon/Wed/Fri)	Art Linkletter's House Party	The Big Payoff	Bob Crosby Show	4:00 **Woman with a Past** 4:15 **The Secret Storm**	**Robert Q. Lewis Show**	5:00 **Barker Bill's Cartoon Show** (Wed/Fri) 5:15 local programming	local programming
NBC	The Today Show				local programming		Ding Dong School	**Breakfast in Hollywood**	11:00 am: Hawkins Falls; 11:15 am: **Three Steps to Heaven**	**Ask Washington**	12:00 pm: **Bride and Groom**; 12:15 pm: local programming	local programming					The Kate Smith Hour		Welcome Travelers	On Your Account	**Pinky Lee Show**	Howdy Doody

== Spring 1954 ==
	7:00 am	7:30 am	8:00 am	8:30 am	9:00 am	9:30 am	10:00 am	10:30 am	11:00 am	11:30 am	noon	12:30 pm	1:00 pm	1:30 pm	2:00 pm	2:30 pm	3:00 pm	3:30 pm	4:00 pm	4:30 pm	5:00 pm	5:30 pm
ABC	local programming				Don McNeill's Breakfast Club		local programming										The Jerry Lester Show (until 5/14)		local programming			
CBS	**The Morning Show**				local programming		Arthur Godfrey Time (M-Th) / 10:00 The Jack Paar Show (F) 11:00 I'll Buy That (F)			Strike It Rich (Mon-Fri) / Rod Brown of the Rocket Rangers (Sat)	12:00 Valiant Lady 12:15 Love of Life	12:30 Search for Tomorrow 12:45 The Guiding Light	1:00 The Brighter Day 1:15 **Portia Faces Life**	The Garry Moore Show (Tue/Thu, 1:30-2:30)	Double or Nothing (Mon/Wed/Fri)	Art Linkletter's House Party	The Big Payoff	Bob Crosby Show	4:00 Woman with a Past 4:15 The Secret Storm	Robert Q. Lewis Show	5:00 Barker Bill's Cartoon Show (Wed/Fri) 5:15 local programming	local programming
NBC	The Today Show				local programming		Ding Dong School	10:30 am: **One Man's Family** 10:45 am: **Three Steps to Heaven**	The Home Show		12:00 pm: **Bride and Groom**; 12:15 pm: **Hawkins Falls**	The Betty White Show	local programming				The Kate Smith Hour		Welcome Travelers	On Your Account	Pinky Lee Show	Howdy Doody

== Summer 1954 ==
	7:00 am	7:30 am	8:00 am	8:30 am	9:00 am	9:30 am	10:00 am	10:30 am	11:00 am	11:30 am	noon	12:30 pm	1:00 pm	1:30 pm	2:00 pm	2:30 pm	3:00 pm	3:30 pm	4:00 pm	4:30 pm	5:00 pm	5:30 pm
ABC	local programming				Don McNeill's Breakfast Club		local programming															
CBS	The Morning Show				local programming		The Garry Moore Show (M-Th, to 11:30 F)	Arthur Godfrey Time (M-Th) / The Garry Moore Show (F)		Strike It Rich	12:00 Valiant Lady 12:15 Love of Life	12:30 Search for Tomorrow 12:45 The Guiding Light	1:00 Portia Faces Life 1:15 **The Seeking Heart**	Welcome Travelers	Robert Q. Lewis Show	Art Linkletter's House Party	The Big Payoff	Bob Crosby Show	4:00 The Brighter Day 4:15 The Secret Storm	On Your Account	5:00 Barker Bill's Cartoon Show (Wed/Fri) 5:15 local programming	local programming
NBC	The Today Show				local programming		Ding Dong School	10:30 am: **A Time to Live** 10:45 am: Three Steps to Heaven	The Home Show		local programming						3:00 pm: One Man's Family; 3:15 pm: **Golden Windows**; 3:30 pm: **First Love**		4:00 pm: **Hawkins Falls**; 4:15 pm: **Bride and Groom**	The Betty White Show	Pinky Lee Show	Howdy Doody

== By network ==
=== ABC ===
New Series

- **Don McNeill's Breakfast Club**
- **The Ern Westmore Show**
- **The Jerry Lester Show**
- **Turn to a Friend**

=== CBS ===
Returning Series

- Action in the Afternoon
- Art Linkletter's House Party
- Arthur Godfrey Time
- The Big Payoff (moved from NBC)
- The Bob Crosby Show
- Double or Nothing
- The Garry Moore Show
- The Guiding Light
- Love of Life
- On Your Account (moved from NBC)
- Rod Brown of the Rocket Rangers
- Search for Tomorrow
- Strike It Rich
- The U.N. in Action
- Wheel of Fortune

New Series

- **Barker Bill's Cartoon Show**
- **The Brighter Day**
- **I'll Buy That**
- **The Jack Paar Show**
- **Journey Through Life**
- **The Morning Show**
- **Portia Faces Life**
- **Robert Q. Lewis Show**
- **The Secret Storm**
- **The Seeking Heart**
- **Valiant Lady**
- **Woman with a Past**

Not Returning From 1952-53

- The Al Pearce Show
- Bert Parks Show
- The Bil Baird Show
- The Bill Cullen Show
- Bride and Groom
- CBS Morning News
- Everywhere I Go
- Freedom Rings
- Homemaker's Exchange
- Meet Your Cover Girl
- Mike and Buff
- Summer School
- There's One in Every Family

=== NBC ===
Returning Series

- Atom Squad
- The Bennetts
- The Big Payoff
- The Bill Cullen Show
- Ding Dong School
- Follow Your Heart
- The Gabby Hayes Show
- Glamour Girl
- Hawkins Falls, Population 6200
- Howdy Doody
- The Kate Smith Hour
- On Your Account (moved to CBS)
- Three Steps to Heaven
- The Today Show
- Welcome Travelers

New Series

- **Ask Washington**
- **The Betty White Show**
- **Breakfast in Hollywood**
- **Bride and Groom**
- **First Love**
- **Golden Windows**
- **The Home Show**
- **One Man's Family**
- **Pinky Lee Show**
- **A Time to Live**

Not Returning From 1952-53

- The Big Payoff (moved to CBS)
- Break the Bank
- Ladies Choice

== See also ==
- 1953-54 United States network television schedule (prime-time)
