= 1956–57 United States network television schedule (daytime) =

The following is the 1956–57 daytime network television schedule for the three major English-language commercial broadcast networks in the United States. It covers the weekday daytime hours from September 1956 to August 1957.

Talk shows are highlighted in yellow, local programming is white, reruns of prime-time programming are orange, game shows are pink, soap operas are chartreuse, news programs are gold and all others are light blue. New series are highlighted in bold.

== Monday-Friday ==
Network		7:00 am	7:30 am	8:00 am	8:30 am	9:00 am	9:30 am	10:00 am	10:30 am	11:00 am	11:30 am	noon	12:30 pm	1:00 pm	1:30 pm	2:00 pm	2:30 pm	3:00 pm	3:30 pm	4:00 pm	4:30 pm	5:00 pm	5:30 pm
ABC	Fall	local programming																	Afternoon Film Festival			The Mickey Mouse Club	
ABC	August	local programming																	**American Bandstand**			The Mickey Mouse Club	
CBS	Fall	7:00 **The Jimmy Dean Show** 7:45 Walter Cronkite with the News		8:00 Captain Kangaroo 8:45 **Charles Collingwood with the News**		local programming		The Garry Moore Show (M-Th, to 11:30 F)	Arthur Godfrey Time (M-Th) / The Garry Moore Show (F)		Strike It Rich	12:00 Valiant Lady 12:15 Love of Life	12:30 Search for Tomorrow 12:45 The Guiding Light	1:00 CBS News/1:10 Stand Up and Be Counted	As the World Turns	**Our Miss Brooks** (repeats)	Art Linkletter's House Party	The Big Payoff	The Bob Crosby Show	4:00 The Brighter Day 4:15 The Secret Storm	The Edge of Night	Local/syndicated programming	
CBS	August	7:00 **The Jimmy Dean Show** 7:45 Walter Cronkite with the News		8:00 Captain Kangaroo 8:45 **Charles Collingwood with the News**		local programming		The Garry Moore Show (M-Th, to 11:30 F)	Arthur Godfrey Time (M-Th) / The Garry Moore Show (F)		Strike It Rich	12:00 **Hotel Cosmopolitan** 12:15 Love of Life	12:30 Search for Tomorrow 12:45 The Guiding Light	1:00 CBS News/1:10 Stand Up and Be Counted	As the World Turns	**Our Miss Brooks** (repeats)	Art Linkletter's House Party	The Big Payoff	The Bob Crosby Show	4:00 The Brighter Day 4:15 The Secret Storm	The Edge of Night	Local/syndicated programming	
NBC	Fall	The Today Show starring Dave Garroway				Local/syndicated programming		Ding Dong School	NBC Bandstand	The Home Show		Tic-Tac-Dough	It Could Be You	local programming			The Tennessee Ernie Ford Show	Matinee Theater (most presentations in color)		4:00 Queen for a Day 4:45 Modern Romances (soap)		Comedy Time* (repeats)	Local/syndicated programming
NBC	November	The Today Show starring Dave Garroway				Local/syndicated programming		Ding Dong School	**The Price Is Right**	The Home Show		Tic-Tac-Dough	It Could Be You	local programming			The Tennessee Ernie Ford Show	Matinee Theater (most presentations in color)		4:00 Queen for a Day 4:45 Modern Romances (soap)		Comedy Time* (repeats)	Local/syndicated programming
NBC	Winter	The Today Show starring Dave Garroway				Local/syndicated programming		The Home Show		The Price Is Right	**Truth or Consequences**	Tic-Tac-Dough	It Could Be You	local programming			The Tennessee Ernie Ford Show	Matinee Theater (most presentations in color)		4:00 Queen for a Day 4:45 Modern Romances (soap)		Comedy Time* (repeats)	Local/syndicated programming
NBC	Summer	The Today Show starring Dave Garroway				Local/syndicated programming		**Arlene Francis Show**	**Treasure Hunt**	The Price Is Right	**Truth or Consequences**	Tic-Tac-Dough	It Could Be You	**Close-Up**	**Club 60**		Bride and Groom	Matinee Theater (most presentations in color)		4:00 Queen for a Day 4:45 Modern Romances (soap)		Comedy Time* (repeats)	Local/syndicated programming

- Comedy Time featured repeats of I Married Joan (fall/summer), It's a Great Life (winter), Dear Phoebe (spring-summer), and Topper (spring).

== Saturday ==
Network		7:00 am	7:30 am	8:00 am	8:30 am	9:00 am	9:30 am	10:00 am	10:30 am	11:00 am	11:30 am	noon	12:30 pm	1:00 pm	1:30 pm	2:00 pm	2:30 pm	3:00 pm	3:30 pm	4:00 pm	4:30 pm	5:00 pm	5:30 pm
CBS	Fall	local programming					Captain Kangaroo		Mighty Mouse Playhouse	Winky Dink and You	Tales of the Texas Rangers	Big Top		local programming									
CBS	Spring	local programming					Captain Kangaroo		Mighty Mouse Playhouse	**Susan's Show**	Tales of the Texas Rangers	Big Top		local programming									
CBS	Summer	local programming					Captain Kangaroo		Mighty Mouse Playhouse	**Susan's Show**	**It's A Hit**	Big Top		local programming									
NBC	Fall	local programming						Howdy Doody In COLOR	I Married Joan (R)	Fury	Cowboy Theater		Watch Mr. Wizard	local programming									
NBC	Spring	local programming						Howdy Doody In COLOR	**The Gumby Show**	Fury	Captain Gallant of the Foreign Legion	**True Story**	**Detective Diary**	local programming									

== Sunday ==
Network		7:00 am	7:30 am	8:00 am	8:30 am	9:00 am	9:30 am	10:00 am	10:30 am	11:00 am	11:30 am	noon	12:30 pm	1:00 pm	1:30 pm	2:00 pm	2:30 pm	3:00 pm	3:30 pm	4:00 pm	4:30 pm	5:00 pm	5:30 pm	6:00 pm	6:30 pm
ABC	Fall	local programming																		College News Conference	Medical Horizons	local programming			
ABC	Winter	local programming																		College News Conference	Medical Horizons	Dean Pike	Press Conference	local programming	
ABC	Spring	local programming																		College News Conference	Medical Horizons	Dean Pike	Open Hearing	local programming	
ABC	Summer	local programming																				College News Conference	Open Hearing	local programming	
CBS	Fall	local programming						Lamp Unto My Feet	Look Up and Live	Eye on New York	Camera Three	Let's Take A Trip	The Adventures of Wild Bill Hickok	Pro Football					Sunday News (3:45PM)	local programming		See It Now		Telephone Time	You Are There
CBS	November	local programming						Lamp Unto My Feet	Look Up and Live	**UN in Action**	Camera Three	Let's Take A Trip	The Adventures of Wild Bill Hickok	**The Heckle and Jeckle Cartoon Show**	Face the Nation	Pro Football					Sunday News (4:45PM)	See It Now		Telephone Time	**Air Power**
CBS	Winter	local programming						Lamp Unto My Feet	Look Up and Live	**UN in Action**	Camera Three	Let's Take A Trip	The Adventures of Wild Bill Hickok	**The Heckle and Jeckle Cartoon Show**	local programming		The Last Word	Face the Nation	CBS World News Roundup	local programming		See It Now		Telephone Time	**Air Power**
CBS	Spring	local programming						Lamp Unto My Feet	Look Up and Live	**UN in Action**	Camera Three	Let's Take A Trip	The Adventures of Wild Bill Hickok	**The Heckle and Jeckle Cartoon Show**	local programming		The Last Word	Face the Nation	CBS World News Roundup	local programming		See It Now		My Friend Flicka	**Air Power**
CBS	Summer	local programming						Lamp Unto My Feet	Look Up and Live	Eye on New York	Camera Three	Let's Take A Trip	The Adventures of Wild Bill Hickok	**The Heckle and Jeckle Cartoon Show**	local programming							Face the Nation	CBS World News Roundup	The Last Word	You Are There
NBC	Fall	local programming													Catholic Hour	local programming	Youth Wants To Know / American Forum	Outlook	Zoo Parade In COLOR	Wide Wide World / Washington Square		local programming		Meet the Press	The Roy Rogers Show
NBC	November	local programming													Frontiers of Faith	local programming	Youth Wants To Know / American Forum	Outlook	Zoo Parade In COLOR	Wide Wide World / Washington Square		Topper (R)	local programming	Meet the Press	The Roy Rogers Show
NBC	Spring	local programming													Frontiers of Faith	local programming	Watch Mr. Wizard	Youth Wants To Know / American Forum	Zoo Parade In COLOR	Wide Wide World / Washington Square / **Project 20** (R)		Topper (R)	Outlook	Meet the Press	The Roy Rogers Show
NBC	Summer	local programming																	Watch Mr. Wizard	Youth Wants To Know / American Forum	Zoo Parade In COLOR	Frontiers of Faith	Outlook	Meet the Press	Cowboy Theater
NBC	August	local programming																	Watch Mr. Wizard	Youth Wants To Know / American Forum	Zoo Parade In COLOR	Catholic Hour	Outlook	Meet the Press	Cowboy Theater

== By network ==
=== ABC ===
**Returning Series**

- Afternoon Film Festival
- College News Conference
- Dean Pike
- Medical Horizons
- The Mickey Mouse Club
- Open Hearing
- Press Conference

**New Series**

- **American Bandstand**

**Not Returning From 1955-56**

=== CBS ===
**Returning Series**

- The Adventures of Wild Bill Hickok
- As the World Turns
- The Brighter Day
- Art Linkletter's House Party
- Arthur Godfrey Time
- The Big Payoff
- Big Top
- The Bob Crosby Show
- Camera Three
- Captain Kangaroo
- CBS News
- CBS World News Roundup
- The Edge of Night
- Eye on New York
- Face the Nation
- The Garry Moore Show
- The Guiding Light
- Lamp Unto My Feet
- The Last Word
- Let's Take A Trip
- Look Up and Live
- Love of Life
- Mighty Mouse Playhouse
- My Friend Flicka
- Stand Up and Be Counted
- Search for Tomorrow
- The Secret Storm
- See It Now
- Strike It Rich
- Sunday News
- Tales of the Texas Rangers
- Telephone Time
- Valiant Lady
- Walter Cronkite with the News
- Winky Dink and You
- You Are There

**New Series**

- **Air Power**
- **Charles Collingwood with the News**
- **The Heckle and Jeckle Cartoon Show**
- **Hotel Cosmopolitan**
- **It's A Hit**
- **The Jimmy Dean Show**
- **NFL on CBS**
- **Our Miss Brooks**
- **Susan's Show**
- **UN in Action**

**Not Returning From 1955-56**

- Barker Bill's Cartoon Show
- Good Morning!
- The Jack Paar Show
- The Johnny Carson Show
- Love Story
- The Morning Show
- On Your Account
- Robert Q. Lewis Show

=== NBC ===
**Returning Series**

- American Forum
- Bride and Groom
- Captain Gallant of the Foreign Legion
- Catholic Hour
- Comedy Time
- Cowboy Theater
- Ding Dong School
- Frontiers of Faith
- Fury
- The Home Show
- Howdy Doody
- It Could Be You
- I Married Joan
- Matinee Theater
- Meet the Press
- Modern Romances
- NBC Bandstand
- Outlook
- Queen for a Day
- The Roy Rogers Show
- The Tennessee Ernie Ford Show
- The Today Show
- Topper
- Tic-Tac-Dough
- Washington Square
- Watch Mr. Wizard
- Wide Wide World
- Youth Wants To Know
- Zoo Parade

**New Series**

- **Arlene Francis Show**
- **Close-Up**
- **Club 60**
- **Detective Diary**
- **The Gumby Show**
- **The Price Is Right**
- **Project 20**
- **Treasure Hunt**
- **True Story**
- **Truth or Consequences**

**Not Returning From 1955-56**

- A Date With Life
- The Ernie Kovacs Show
- Feather Your Nest
- First Love
- Pinky Lee Show
- The World of Mr. Sweeney

== See also ==
- 1956-57 United States network television schedule (prime-time)
- 1956-57 United States network television schedule (late night)

== Sources ==
- https://web.archive.org/web/20071015122215/http://curtalliaume.com/abc_day.html
- https://web.archive.org/web/20071015122235/http://curtalliaume.com/cbs_day.html
- https://web.archive.org/web/20071012211242/http://curtalliaume.com/nbc_day.html
- Castleman & Podrazik, The TV Schedule Book, McGraw-Hill Paperbacks, 1984
- Hyatt, The Encyclopedia Of Daytime Television, Billboard Books, 1997
- TV schedules, New York Times, September 1956 – September 1957 (microfilm)
