= Ross Martin =

American actor (1920–1981)

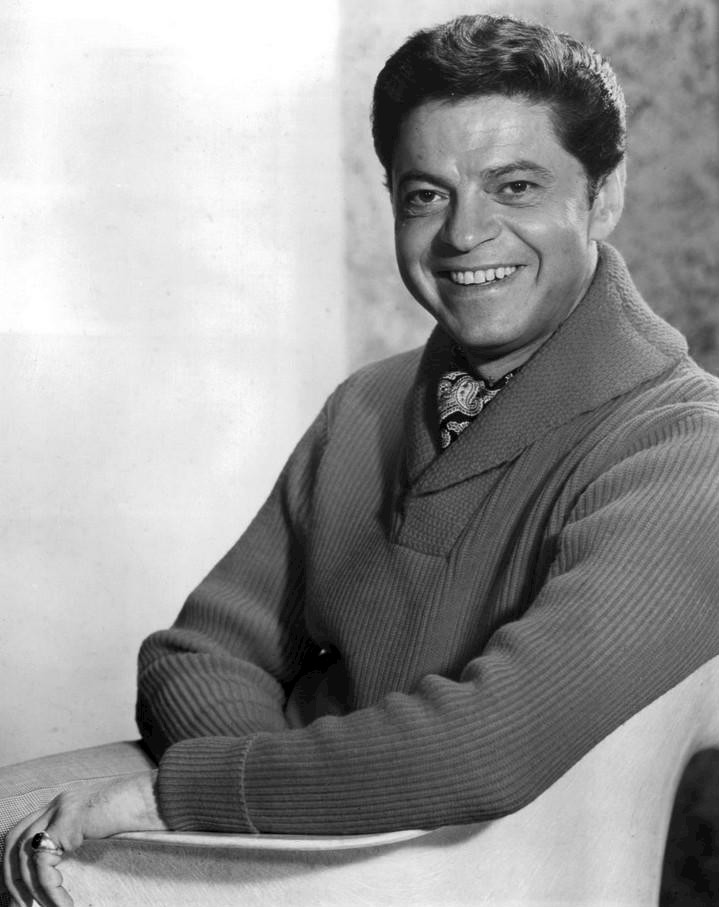
- Martin in 1967
- Born: Martin Rosenblatt; March 22, 1920; Gródek, Poland
- Died: July 3, 1981 (aged 61); Ramona, California, U.S.
- Resting place: Mount Sinai Memorial Park Cemetery
- Education: City College of New York; George Washington University
- Occupation: Actor
- Years active: 1946–1981
- Spouses: Muriel Weiss (m. 1941; died 1965) Olavee Parsons (m. 1967)
- Children: 3

Ross Martin (born Martin Rosenblatt, March 22, 1920 – July 3, 1981) was an American radio, voice, stage, film, and television actor. Martin was best known for portraying Artemus Gordon on the CBS Western series The Wild Wild West, which aired from 1965 to 1969. He was the voice of Doctor Paul Williams in 1972's Sealab 2020, additional characters in 1973's Butch Cassidy and the Sundance Kids, and additional character voices in 1978's Jana of the Jungle.

== Early life ==
Martin was born to a Polish Jewish family in Gródek, Poland (now Horodok, Ukraine). He and his parents immigrated to New York City when he was an infant. Recorded as Izak and Sara Rosenblat and infant son Marcus, they boarded the steamship New Rochelle at Danzig, which was then a Free City under the League of Nations; the ship sailed on August 29, 1920, and arrived at the Port of New York on September 18. As they were steerage passengers, they were obliged to go to Ellis Island to undergo immigrant inspection. They settled in The Bronx. Martin spoke Polish, Yiddish, and some Russian before learning English and later added French, Spanish, and Italian.

Martin attended City College of New York, where he graduated magna cum laude, then earned a law degree from the National University School of Law (later part of the George Washington University).

== Career ==
Despite academic training in business, instruction, and law, Martin chose a career in acting. He was partners in a comedy team with Bernie West for several years, then appeared on many radio and live TV broadcasts, including playing Wyatt Earp in the January 20, 1952 episode of The Gabby Hayes Show. He made his Broadway debut in Hazel Flagg in 1953.

Martin's first film was the George Pal 1955 production Conquest of Space, followed by a brief appearance in The Colossus of New York (1958), as the scientist father of Charles Herbert. In 1959, Martin appeared in the episode "Echo" on Alcoa Presents: One Step Beyond. He appeared in two 1959 episodes of David Janssen's crime drama series, Richard Diamond, Private Detective as well as Season 1, Episode 13 of The Twilight Zone, "The Four of Us Are Dying". Soon after, he caught the eye of Blake Edwards, who cast him in a number of widely varied roles: as Sal in the 1959 Peter Gunn episode "The Fuse"; his breakout role as comic sidekick Andamo in the 1959 CBS drama series Mr. Lucky, asthmatic kidnapper Red Lynch in the 1962 thriller Experiment in Terror (for which he was nominated for a Golden Globe Award for Best Supporting Actor in a Motion Picture), culminating with a role in The Great Race, as the smoothly villainous Baron Rolfe Von Stuppe. He was also a regular on Stump the Stars from 1962 to 1963.

=== The Wild Wild West ===
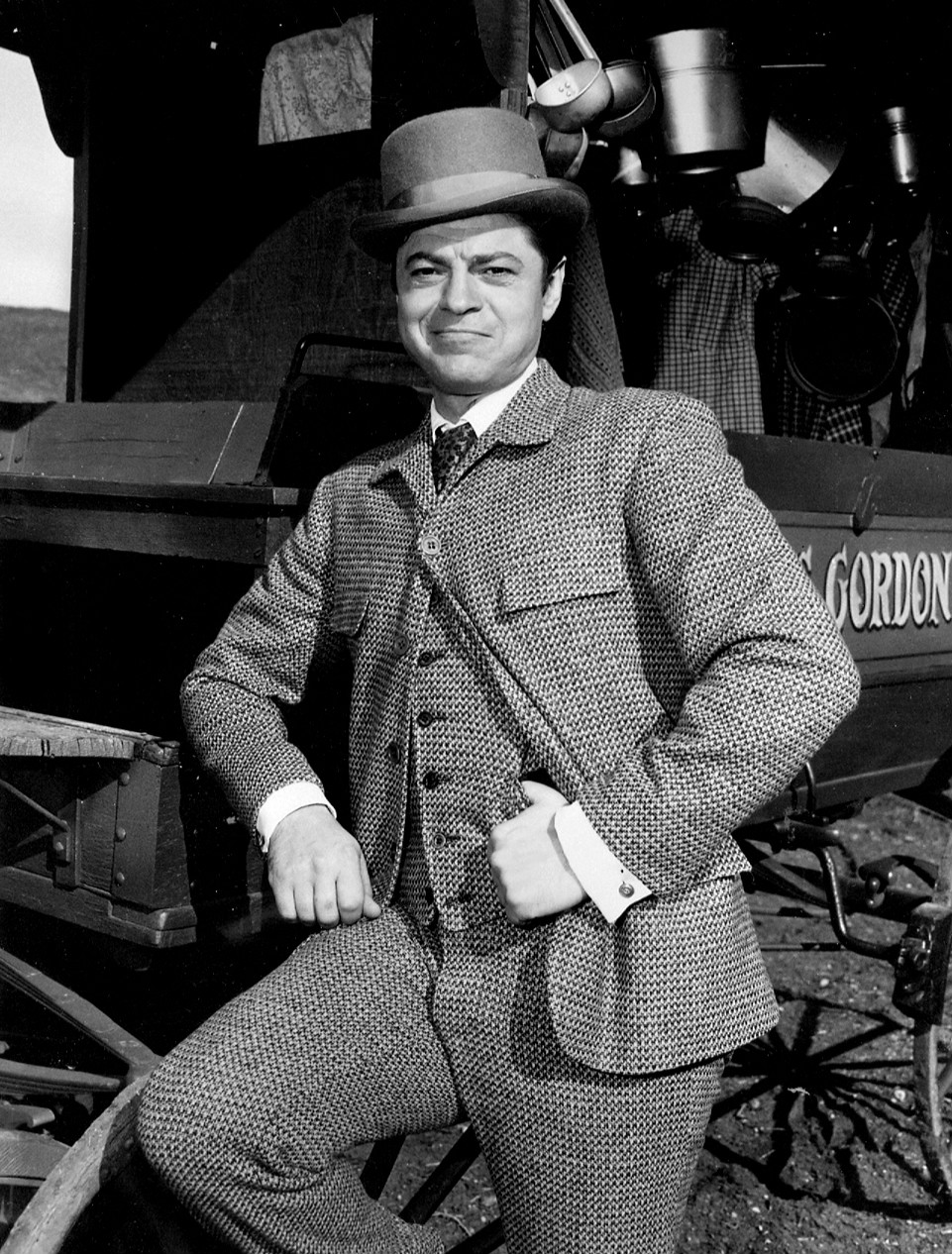
Martin in 1965

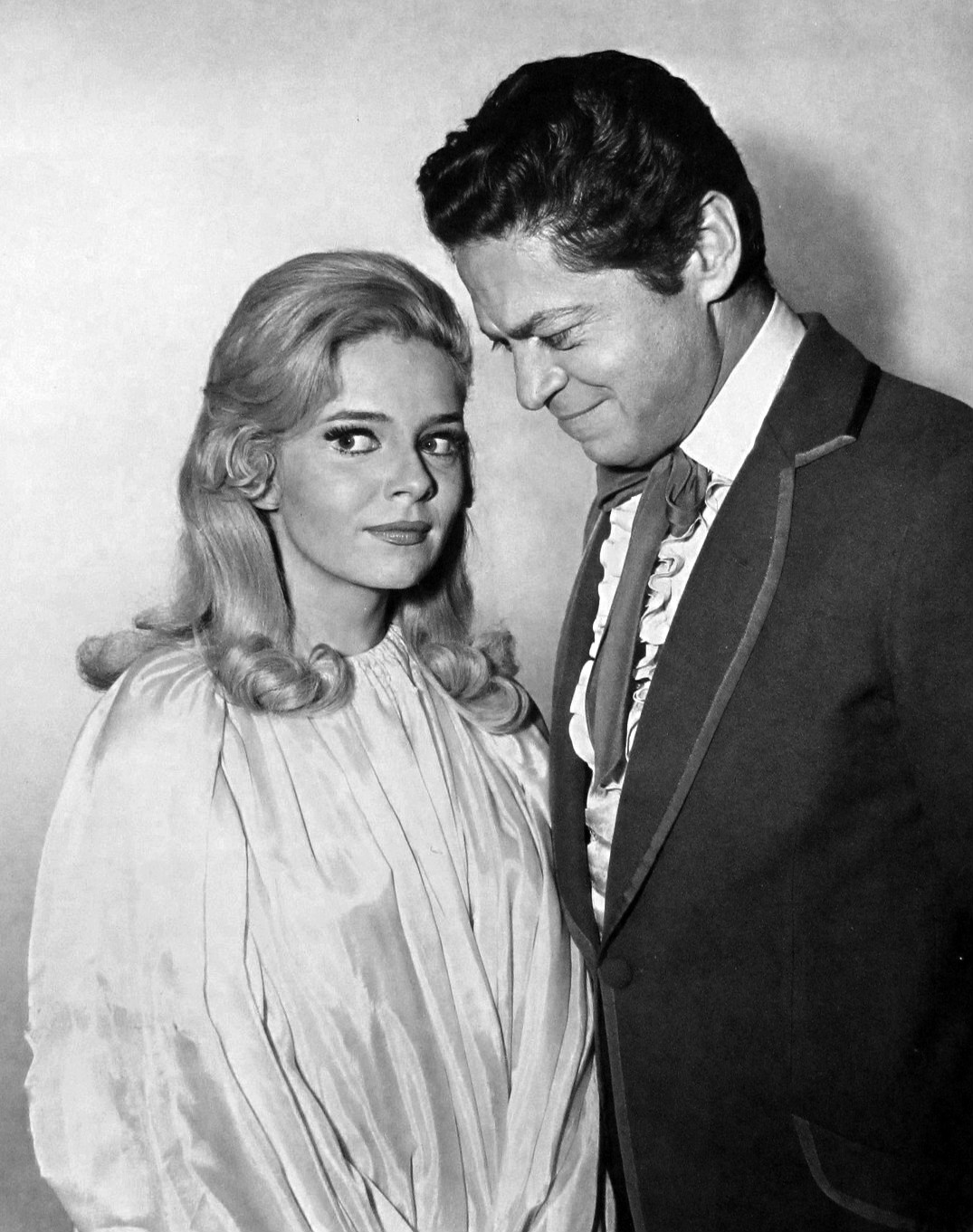
Martin as Artemus Gordon with Ann Elder in The Wild, Wild West, 1966.

After his performance in The Great Race, CBS cast Martin in what was to become his most famous role, Secret Service agent Artemus Gordon in The Wild Wild West, co-starring with Robert Conrad. The Artemus Gordon character was a master gadgeteer and disguise artist, and these attributes fitted Martin perfectly. Martin himself created most of his disguises for the show, and most of the cast had no idea what he would look like until seeing him during the shooting of the episode. The recent DVD release of the first season of the series includes a recently discovered pre-production sketch Martin had made of his very first make-up design for the pilot episode. Another episode, "The Night of the Casual Killer," revealed another of Martin's talents: he was a classically trained violinist.

In 1968, Martin broke his leg and then suffered a near-fatal heart attack, forcing The Wild Wild West to replace him with other actors, including Charles Aidman, William Schallert and Alan Hale Jr for nine episodes. He was nominated for an Emmy Award for Outstanding Lead Actor in a Drama Series, for the fourth and final season of The Wild Wild West. The series was cancelled in 1969 in the midst of a national controversy over violence on television.

=== Later career ===
After The Wild, Wild West ended, Martin continued his career in various guest roles on television and in roles in television films. In 1970, Martin portrayed Alexander Hamilton in the NBC television special Swing Out, Sweet Land, hosted by John Wayne. He also appeared in a 1970 episode of The Immortal ("White Elephants Don't Grow on Trees"). The following year, Martin tried his hand at directing. He guest starred in the 1971 episode of Columbo entitled "Suitable for Framing", as Dale Kingston, a murderous art critic, and also a 1971 episode of Love, American Style, which he also directed. Martin directed another episode of the series in 1973. Later that same year, he appeared as the famed Asian detective Charlie Chan in The Return of Charlie Chan. He made a guest appearance on Barnaby Jones in 1974, and also lent his voice to an episode of Wait Till Your Father Gets Home later that year.

In 1976, Martin returned to the stage as John Adams in a touring production of the musical 1776. In 1978, he did more voice work for the animated series Jana of the Jungle. He reprised the role of Artemus Gordon in two Wild, Wild West television movies: The Wild Wild West Revisited in 1979 and More Wild Wild West in 1980. He had a four-episode recurring role as kumu mobster Tony Alika on Hawaii Five-O from 1978 to 1979. In 1980, Martin appeared in the third episode of The Love Boat as Tom Thorton. Martin's final role was in the 1983 television movie I Married Wyatt Earp in which he played the role of Jacob Speigler. The film aired two years after his death.

== Personal life and death ==
Martin married his first wife, Muriel Weiss, in 1941. They had one child together, a daughter, Phyllis Rosenblatt (a New York artist). Weiss died from cancer in 1965. (Martin and Weiss were separated at the time of her death.)

In 1967, Martin married Olavee Lucile Parsons (a successful model and documentary director) and adopted her two children, Rebecca (Martin) Schacht and George Martin. Martin and Parsons remained married until Martin's death in 1981. She died in 2002.

On July 3, 1981, Martin suffered a fatal heart attack after a game of tennis at San Vicente Tennis Ranch, San Diego County Club of Ramona, California. He was rushed to the Pomerado Hospital in Poway, California, but was pronounced dead on arrival.

He is interred in Mount Sinai Memorial Park Cemetery in Los Angeles.

== TV and filmography ==
| Year | Title | Role | Notes |
|---|---|---|---|
| 1948 | Studio One | David Willson | Episode: "The Storm" |
| 1949 | Lights Out | | Episode: "I Dreamt I Died" |
| 1950 | Lights Out | Alex | Episode: "A Toast to Sergeant Farnsworth" |
| 1950 | Lights Out | | Episode: "The Gloves of Gino" |
| 1951 | Lights Out | | Episode: "The Man with the Astrakhan Hat" |
| 1950 | Armstrong Circle Theatre | | Episode: "The Magnificent Gesture" |
| 1950 | Armstrong Circle Theatre | Peter Lessing | Episode: "The Oldest Song" |
| 1950–1955 | Treasury Men in Action | Agent | 189 episodes |
| 1951 | Cameo Theatre | Stuart Grange | Episode: "Strange Identity" |
| 1951 | Somerset Maugham TV Theatre | | Episode: "The French Governor" |
| 1951 | Somerset Maugham TV Theatre | | Episode: "The Great Man" |
| 1951 | Somerset Maugham TV Theatre | Philippe | Episode: "Appearance and Reality" |
| 1951 | The Web | | Episode: "No Escape" |
| 1951 | The Web | | Episode: "The Man Who Was Always Right" |
| 1952 | The Gabby Hayes Show | | Episode: "Marshal of Tombstone", played Wyatt Earp |
| 1953 | Goodyear Television Playhouse | Narrator | Episode: "The Cipher" |
| 1953 | Johnny Jupiter | Professor Dexter Spiegelmacher | Episode: "Duckweather and the Professor" |
| 1953 | Suspense | | Episode: "The Riddle of Mayerling" |
| 1953 | Suspense | | Episode: "Needle in a Haystack" |
| 1953 | The Web | Sam Fletchet | Episode: "Kind Stranger" |
| 1954 | The Web | Harvey Frane | Episode: "The Hunted" |
| 1954 | Justice | Bert Calvin | Episode: "Murder at Red Oaks" |
| 1954 | You Are There | Robert Coffin / Napoleon | 8 episodes |
| 1954–1955 | Concerning Miss Marlowe | Bojalian | 17 episodes |
| 1954–1956 | The Big Story | Lt. Mason | Episode: "Arthur Petacque, Chicago Sun-Times" |
| 1954–1956 | The Big Story | | Episode: "Eye Witness" |
| 1954–1956 | The Big Story | William Fernandez | Episode: "Thurman Johns, Reporter: Phoenix Arizona Gazette" |
| 1955 | NBC Television Opera Theatre | Dorante | Episode: "The Would-Be Gentleman" |
| 1955 | Armstrong Circle Theatre | George Rebus | Episode: "TV or Not TV" |
| 1955 | Conquest of Space | Sgt. Andre Fodor | |
| 1955 | The Philco Television Playhouse | Rodney Wilkins | Episode: "Letter of Recommendation" |
| 1955–1958 | Modern Romances | | 60 episodes |
| 1956 | The United States Steel Hour | Adolfo | Episode: "Wetback Run" |
| 1957 | The Alcoa Hour | Tony | Episode: "A Double Life" |
| 1957 | Camera Three | Alfred Barr | Episode: "The Scope of Picasso" |
| 1957 | Studio One | Lt. Maxwell | Episode: "The Human Barrier" |
| 1957 | Studio One | | Episode: "First Prize for Murder" |
| 1958 | Underwater Warrior | Sgt. Joe O'Brien | Movie, early frogman |
| 1958 | The Colossus of New York | Dr. Jeremy 'Jerry' Spensser | Movie, brilliant scientist |
| 1958 | The United States Steel Hour | | Episode: "The Charmer" |
| 1958 | The Court of Last Resort | Phillip Huston | Episode: "The Phillip Huston Case" |
| 1958 | Suspicion | Richardson | Episode: "The Hollow Man" |
| 1958 | Official Detective | Dellert | Episode: "The Combination" |
| 1958 | The Walter Winchell File | Buckner | Episode: "Portrait of a Cop: File #27" |
| 1958 | Gunsmoke | Dan Clell | Episode: "Bottleman" |
| 1958 | Gunsmoke | Danny Keppert | Episode: Land Deal |
| 1958 | Colonel Humphrey Flack | Jacques | Episode: "The Big Wheels" |
| 1958 | Bat Masterson | Caulder Larson | Episode: "The Treasure of Worry Hill" |
| 1958 | The Ann Sothern Show | Augie | Episode: "The Big Gamble" |
| 1958 | U.S. Marshal | Ray Doniger | Episode: "Check Artist" |
| 1958 | M Squad | Corvin | Episode: "Contraband" |
| 1959 | Peter Gunn | Sal Matzi | Episode: "The Fuse" |
| 1959 | Naked City | Carlo | Episode: "Ten Cent Dreams" |
| 1959 | Sea Hunt | Finch | Episode: "The Dam" |
| 1959 | Sea Hunt | USCG Captain Stevens | Episode: "The Briefcase" |
| 1959 | Steve Canyon | Aly Brahma | Season 1/Episode 31: "Room 313" |
| 1959 | One Step Beyond | Paul Marlin | Episode: "Echo" |
| 1959–1960 | Mr. Lucky | Andamo | 34 episodes |
| 1960 | Laramie | Angel | Episode: "A Sound of Bells" |
| 1960 | The Twilight Zone | Johnny | Episode: "The Four of Us Are Dying" |
| 1961 | The Law and Mr. Jones | Frank Brody | Episode: "The Enemy" |
| 1961 | 87th Precinct | Joe Czepreghi | Episode: "Occupation: Citizen" |
| 1961 | Zorro | Marcos Estrada | Episode: "Auld Acquaintance" |
| 1962 | Experiment in Terror | Garland Humphrey 'Red' Lynch | |
| 1962 | Geronimo | Mangus | |
| 1963 | Wagon Train | Sam Pulaski | Episode: "The Sam Pulaski Story" |
| 1963 | The Twilight Zone | Lt. Ted Mason | Episode: "Death Ship" |
| 1963 | Bonanza | Nick Biancci | Episode: "Little Man... Ten Feet Tall" |
| 1963 | The Ceremony | Le Caq | |
| 1963 | The Danny Thomas Show | Copa Club Musician | Season 11, episode 11 "The Two Musketeers" |
| 1964 | Vacation Playhouse | Claudie Hughes | Episode: "I and Claudie" |
| 1965 | The Man from Button Willow | Andy Svenson | Voice |
| 1965 | The Great Race | Baron Rolfe von Stuppe | |
| 1965–1969 | The Wild Wild West | Artemus Gordon | 95 episodes |
| 1969 | The Carol Burnett Show | Himself | Season 2 Episode on 3/10/1969 |
| 1970 | The Immortal | Eddie Yoman | Episode: " White Elephants Don't Grow on Trees" |
| 1970 | Swing Out, Sweet Land | Alexander Hamilton | Television special |
| 1971 | The Sheriff | Larry Walters | ABC Movie of the Week |
| 1971 | Columbo | Dale Kingston | Episode: "Suitable for Framing" |
| 1971 | Night Gallery | Mr. Gingold | Episode: "Camera Obscura" |
| 1972 | The F.B.I. | George Barrows | Episode: "The Wizard" |
| 1972 | Sealab 2020 | Dr. Paul Williams | Voice |
| 1972 | ABC Afterschool Special | Stan | Episode: "The Last of the Curlews" |
| 1972 | The Crooked Hearts | Sgt. Daniel Shane | ABC Movie of the Week |
| 1972 | The Bold Ones: The New Doctors | Harry Burke | Episode: "A Purge of Madness" |
| 1973 | Dying Room Only | Jim Cutler | ABC Movie of the Week |
| 1973 | Tenafly | Grady Hall | Episode: "Joyride to Nowhere" |
| 1973 | Ironside | Arthur Damien | Episode: "Mind for Murder" |
| 1973 | Night Gallery | Bradley Meredith | Episode: "The Other Way Out" |
| 1973 | The Return of Charlie Chan | Charlie Chan | Television movie |
| 1974 | Skyway to Death | Martin Leonard | ABC Movie of the Week |
| 1974 | Barnaby Jones | Maxwell Imry | Episode: "Friends Till Death" |
| 1975 | The Invisible Man | Amb Diego Devega | Episode: "The Fine Art of Diplomacy" |
| 1975 | Ellery Queen | Dr. Otis Tremaine | Episode: " The Adventure of the Pharaoh's Curse" |
| 1976 | Gemini Man | Carl Victor | Episode: "Minotaur" |
| 1976 | Sanford and Son | Aram | Episode: "California Crude" |
| 1977 | Blansky's Beauties | Sheik Ben-Ali | Episode: "Nancy Goes Sheik" |
| 1977 | Charlie's Angels | Dr. Perine | Episode: "Unidentified Flying Angels" |
| 1978 | Quark | Zorgon the Malevolent | 2 episodes "All the Emperor's Quasi-Norms, Parts 1 & 2" |
| 1978 | Vega$ | Werner Worthmeyer | Episode: "Mother Mishkin" |
| 1978–1979 | Hawaii Five-O | Tony Alika | 4 episodes |
| 1978 | The New Adventures of Wonder Woman | Bernard Havitol | Episode: "IRAC is Missing" |
| 1978 | Wild and Wooly | Otis Bergen | TV movie |
| 1979 | The Return of Mod Squad | Buck Prescott | Television movie |
| 1979 | The Seekers | Supply Pleasant | Television movie |
| 1979 | Password Plus | Himself | |
| 1979 | The Wild Wild West Revisited | Artemus Gordon | Television movie |
| 1980 | The Love Boat | Tom Thornton | Episode: "April's Love/Happy Ending/We Three" |
| 1980 | Fantasy Island | Ace Scanlon | Episode: "The Devil and Mandy Breem/The Millionaire" |
| 1980 | More Wild Wild West | Artemus Gordon | Television movie |
| 1981 | Mork & Mindy | Godfrey | Episode: "Mork and the Bum Rap" |
| 1983 | I married Wyatt Earp | Jacob Spiegler | Television movie Released posthumously (final film role) |
