= Hollywood Today =

1955 American TV series

- Genre: News, entertainment
- Country of origin: United States
- Original language: English

Original release
- Network: NBC
- Release: January 3 – September 23, 1955

Hollywood Today is an American television program that was broadcast on NBC from January 3, 1955, until September 23, 1955. It was later renamed Hollywood Backstage.

== Format ==
The series began as a Hollywood gossip show with columnist Sheilah Graham as host, running 15 minutes each weekday. Each week featured a celebrity co-host. During the summer, the show was lengthened to 30 minutes and renamed Hollywood Backstage.

Later that summer, Ern Westmore replaced Graham as host, and the focus changed to makeovers. The latter format was sponsored by Charles Antell Inc., advertising its liquid makeup.

== Related programs ==
ABC television broadcast a weekly nighttime version of Hollywood Backstage beginning on August 7, 1955, and ending on September 11, 1955. Westmore was host, with each episode featuring a makeover of a woman selected from the studio audience and a demonstration of how an actress had been made up for a specific role.

On September 26, 1955, The Search for Beauty, with Westmore as host, took over the time slot previously occupied by Hollywood Backstage. His wife Betty Westmore was co-host, with Phil Hanna as assistant and Dick Hageman as announcer. This program also featured celebrity guests and beauty tips for women in the audience. It ended on December 9, 1955.

Westmore had a similar program, The Ern Westmore Show, on ABC-TV in 1953.
