= Randy Merriman =

American television producer, host and broadcaster

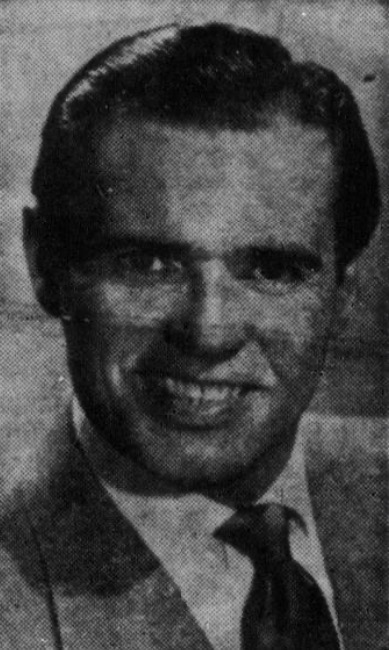
- Merriman in a 1960 publication
- Born: Anson Randolph Merriman; December 1, 1911; Minneapolis, Minnesota, US
- Died: October 27, 2005 (aged 93)
- Occupations: Television producer, game show host, broadcaster

Anson Randolph Merriman (December 1, 1911 – October 27, 2005) was an American television producer, game show host, and broadcaster. He was the first host of The Big Payoff game show on NBC.

== Early life ==
Merriman was born on December 1, 1911, in Minneapolis. After his parents died when he was two years old, he was raised by his grandparents. As a child, he operated a personal circus, for which he painted local dogs as zebras to perform. For a time, he attended military school, which he left at age 17 to join the Ringling Bros. and Barnum & Bailey Circus as a prop man. Because of his loud voice, he later became a barker.

== Career ==
Merriman subsequently returned to Minneapolis, where he worked as an usher at the Stage Theater until it closed. He and his best friend Tom Green then went into vaudeville as a double act; after Green quit, Merriman became emcee of a variety show.

Merriman's first job in broadcasting was at local Minneapolis-St. Paul radio station KSTP, where he hosted Tavern Trouper, a World War II show enabling Minnesotans serving in the South Pacific to talk to those back home, before touring for the USO with Bob Hope. After the war he returned to Minneapolis and KSTP, with Jimmy Valentine hosting the early quiz show Fun For Your Money on the NBC affiliate KSTP-TV. In 1951, he became the first host of The Big Payoff in New York, working with assistant and former Miss America Bess Myerson. He was also involved in the show's production. He left the show in 1957 to be replaced by Bob Paige.

After returning to Minnesota in 1958, Merriman worked for WCCO, hosting shows including Honest to Goodness with Dick Chapman and the Fan in the Stands pre-game radio shows on WCCO AM for the Minnesota Twins.

Merriman was inducted into the Minnesota Broadcasting Hall of Fame in 2003.

== Personal life and death ==
Merriman was married twice; his first wife, with whom he had a daughter and two sons, died in the mid-1970s and he remarried two years later. He retired to Boca Raton, Florida, where he was active in the Zuhrah Shrine Merrymakers and became a member of the International Brotherhood of Magicians. He died at home of pneumonia on October 27, 2005, aged 93.
