= 1955–56 United States network television schedule (late night) =

These are the late night Monday to Friday schedules for all three networks, starting in September 1955 for each calendar season. All times are listed in Eastern and Pacific time zones.

Talk shows are highlighted in yellow, local programming is shown in white.

Tonight Starring Steve Allen aired at 11:30 PM Eastern Time.

== Schedule ==
	11:00 PM	11:30 PM	12:00 AM	12:30 AM	1:00 AM	1:30 AM	2:00 AM	2:30 AM	3:00 AM	3:30 AM	4:00 AM	4:30 PM	5:00 AM	5:30 AM
ABC	local programming or sign-off
CBS	local programming or sign-off
NBC	11:15 PM: Steve Allen Show	11:30 PM: Tonight Starring Steve Allen			local programming or sign-off
