= 1954–55 United States network television schedule (late night) =

These are the late night Monday-Friday schedules on all four networks for each calendar season beginning September 1954. All times are Eastern and Pacific.

Two of the four networks began late-night schedules in 1954; DuMont aired its first and only show, The Ernie Kovacs Show, beginning in summer 1954, while NBC resumed late-night programming with Tonight, three years after it had canceled Broadway Open House. DuMont ceased programming the late-night time slot in spring 1955 ahead of its shutdown (Kovacs would then move to NBC), while NBC has run Tonight (now The Tonight Show) continuously since then.

Talk shows are highlighted in yellow, local programming is white.

== Schedule ==
Network		11:00 PM	11:30 PM	12:00 AM	12:30 AM	1:00 AM	1:30 AM	2:00 AM	2:30 AM	3:00 AM	3:30 AM	4:00 AM	4:30 PM	5:00 AM	5:30 AM
ABC		local programming or sign-off
CBS		local programming or sign-off
DMN	Fall	11:15 PM – 12:15 AM: The Ernie Kovacs Show			local programming or sign-off
DMN	Spring	local programming or sign-off
NBC		11:15 PM: Tonight Starring Steve Allen				local programming or sign-off
