= Rod Brown of the Rocket Rangers =

Original release
- Network: CBS
- Release: April 18, 1953 – May 29, 1954

Rod Brown of the Rocket Rangers is a 30-minute, weekly CBS television network outer space adventure series, broadcast live Saturdays from April 18, 1953 to May 29, 1954.

== Synopsis ==
Set in 2153 and inspired by Tom Corbett, Space Cadet (1950 - 1955), the series depicted the adventures of fearless Rocket Rangers, who operated from Omega Base, piloting their nuclear-powered spaceship Beta throughout the Solar System, to battle crime and the weird menace of extraterrestrial life-forms. The three Rangers were curly-haired Rod Brown (Cliff Robertson), his prickly partner Frank Boyd (Bruce Hall), and chubby, bespectacled comic relief Wilbur "Wormsey" Wormser (Jack Weston). Their immediate superior was Commander Swift (John Boruff). Each episode was a self-contained story, as opposed to the other serialized space shows then appearing on TV.

Director George Gould had also been the director of ABC's Tom Corbett from 1950 to 1952, and when he was hired to direct Rod Brown, he carried with him to CBS several of the writers for that pioneering series, plus its basic concepts, as well as the major special effect, an amplifier producing travelling mattes. The very close similarity between Rod Brown and Tom Corbett generated at least one lawsuit, which was settled out of court, and at the time, did not affect the broadcasting of new weekly Rod Brown episodes in any way. The Rod Brown kinescopes however were never rebroadcast. The series ran a total of 58 episodes.

Rod Brown's adventures had a sponsor, Jell-O Instant Pudding. However, there are very few premiums or toys associated with the series, as compared to its rival live space adventure series such as Captain Video, Space Patrol, and Tom Corbett, Space Cadet. A Rocket Ranger membership card and a Rocket Ranger Squadron Charter have been observed. In addition, plaid flannel shirts for young boys, featuring a solid-color flannel placket silkscreened with the Rocket Ranger title, space ship, and spaceman, were also available.

The program began each week with an introduction: "Surging with the power of the atom, gleaming like great silver bullets, the mighty Rocket Ranger space ships stand by for blast-off. Up, up, rockets blazing with white-hot fury, the man-made meteors ride through the atmosphere, breaking the gravity barrier, pushing up and out, faster and faster, and then...outer space and high adventure for the Rocket Rangers."

A verse from Robert Allen's TV theme song went: "From the sands of Mars, out to the distant stars, we're the Rocket Ranger Corps..."

== The Rocket Ranger Code ==
The membership card offered as a premium displayed the "Rocket Ranger Code" as follows:

ON MY HONOR AS A ROCKET RANGER, I PLEDGE THAT:

1. I SHALL always chart my course according to the Constitution of the United States of America.
2. I SHALL never cross orbits with the Rights and Beliefs of others.
3. I SHALL blast at full space-speed to protect the Weak and Innocent.
4. I SHALL stay out of collision orbit with the laws of my State and Community.
5. I SHALL cruise in parallel orbit with my Parents and Teachers.
6. I SHALL not roar my rockets unwisely, and shall be Courteous at all times.
7. I SHALL keep my gyros steady and reactors burning by being Industrious and Thrifty.
8. I SHALL keep my scanner tuned to Learning and remain coupled to my Studies.
9. I SHALL keep my mind out of free-fall by being mentally alert.
10. I SHALL blast the meteors from the paths of other people by being Kind and Considerate.

== Production ==
It was an early lead role for Cliff Robertson.
