= First Love (1954 TV series) =

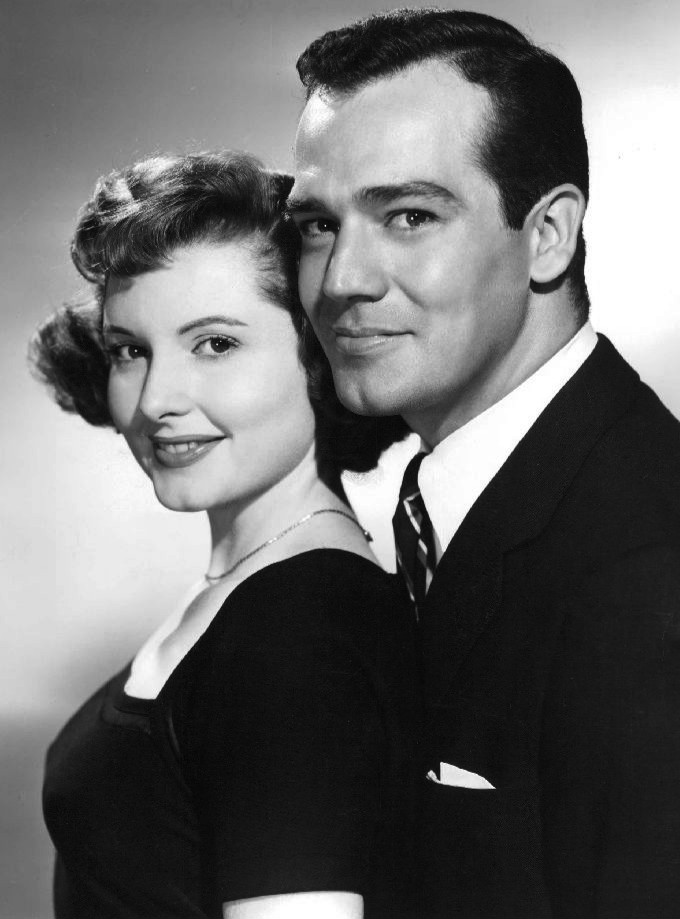
- Patricia Barry and Val Dufour as Laurie and Zach James, 1954.
- Genre: Soap opera
- Created by: Adrian Samish
- Starring: Val Dufour; Tod Andrews; Patricia Barry; Paul McGrath; Rosemary Prinz; Frankie Thomas
- Country of origin: United States
- Original language: English
- No. of episodes: 389

Production
- Running time: 15 minutes

Original release
- Network: NBC Daytime
- Release: 5 July 1954 – 30 December 1955

First Love is an American soap opera which ran on NBC Daytime from July 5, 1954 to December 30, 1955.

== Overview ==
The series aired at 4:15 p.m. EST, between Golden Windows and Concerning Miss Marlowe. Although the show had a strong fan following, at the time NBC had little use for developing any of their daytime shows (the first successful NBC daytime soap was not until 1963's The Doctors) and canceled First Love after a year and a half. Many cast members such as Patricia Barry, Val Dufour and Rosemary Prinz went on to become long-running daytime stars.

Created by Adrian Samish and written by Manya Starr, the series centered on jet engineer Zach James (Val Dufour, then Tod Andrews) and his difficult marriage to Laurie James (née Kennedy) (Patricia Barry). Due to being neglected as a child, Zach was obsessed with building a name for himself. Laurie tried to understand him but was unable to help him deal with his problems, as he went on trial for the murder of a woman aviator he may have been having an affair with.

The show became known chiefly for a major blooper early in its run. A Friday cliffhanger involved Zach (Dufour) seeing his friend Chris (Frankie Thomas) crash his plane. Zach ran to tell Chris' wife Amy (Prinz), "Chris cracked up the plane." In his rush, Dufour blurted out, "Chris crapped", then abruptly added, "...on the plane." Patricia Barry began to giggle. When the camera cut to a "bereaved" Prinz, she was shaking with laughter. Supposedly NBC nearly fired all three actors, but changed their minds after fans wrote in praising them for the scene. In 2003 Prinz denied such a scene ever made it to the air.

== Cast ==
- Zach James - Val Dufour, then Tod Andrews
- Laurie James - Patricia Barry
- Matthew James - Paul McGrath
- Amy - Rosemary Prinz
- Chris - Frankie Thomas
- Paul Kennedy - Melville Ruick
- Doris Kennedy - Peggy Allenby
- Judge Kennedy - Howard Smith
- Mike Kennedy - John Dutra
- Bruce McKee - Jay Barney
- Quentin Andrews - Frederic Downs
- Peggy Gordon - Henrietta Moore
- Phil Gordon - Joe Warren

== Production ==
First Love debuted as a sustaining program. Later Jergens sponsored it on Mondays, Wednesdays, and Fridays. When that company canceled the show, the trade publication Billboard reported, "The program has never really done as well as the advertiser expected." Al Morrison was the producer, and Joe Behar was the director. The show initially originated from Philadelphia and was broadcast from 3:30 to 3:45 Eastern Time. Beginning August 30, 1954, it originated from New York with John Goetz as director, and it was seen from 4:15 to 4:30 p.m. E. T.

== Critical response ==
A review of the premiere episode in Billboard compliment the show's production and acting (especially that of Barry and Dufour). It noted that the plot was hardly original "but it's bound to strike a sympathetic note with more than one lonely hausfrau."
