= The Ern Westmore Hollywood Glamour Show =

1953 American beauty tip TV show

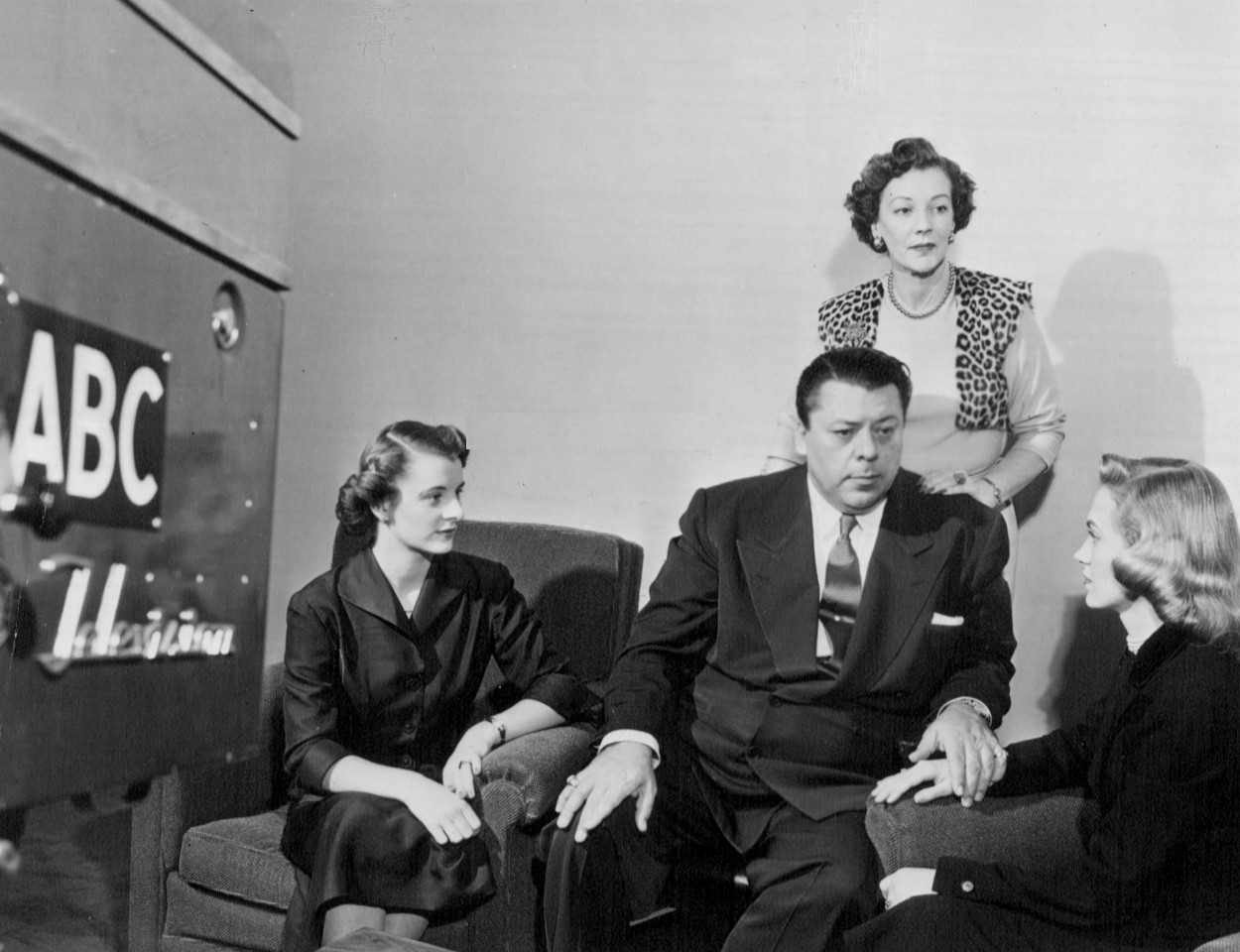
Ern Westmore and his wife Betty Egan (standing), with two members of the studio audience, on the ABC-TV network edition of show (1955)

The Ern Westmore Hollywood Glamour Show (also known as The Ern Westmore Show and Hollywood Backstage) is an American television program that was originally syndicated in 1953 and carried on the ABC network from August 7, 1955, until September 11, 1955.

The show is hosted by Hollywood make-up artist Ernest Westmore, who offered beauty tips to viewers and gave a makeover to a member of the studio audience, who was then serenaded by a vocal singer, similar to the end of the Miss America Pageant. It was produced by Kroger Babb and, along with Turn to a Friend, was part of a two-program entry by ABC into daytime TV. Besides Westmore, the show featured Dick Hyde, Betty Egan, Eddie Varden, Helen Winston, and Robert and Helen Little.

At times the program originated from local TV stations, including WAFM in Birmingham, WKRC in Cincinnati, and WTVJ in Miami. The ABC version of the program was broadcast from 7:30 to 8 p.m. Eastern Time on Sundays.

A review in the October 17, 1953, issue of the trade publication Billboard described Westmore as "ultra-candid" in the episode that was reviewed and said that he was "far too clipped and cold in his frank appraisal of the grooming deficiencies" of women in the audience.

The show's final broadcast, and that of Turn to a Friend, came on December 31, 1953, as ABC shifted its focus from afternoon programming to morning shows.

== See also ==
- Hollywood Today, a similar program of the era also hosted by Ern Westmore

== Bibliography ==
- Marsha Francis Cassidy (2005), What Women Watched: Daytime Television in the 1950s, University of Texas, ISBN 978-0-292-70627-9
- Frank Westmore and Muriel Davidson. The Westmores of Hollywood. Lippincott, Philadelphia, 1976.
- Ern Westmore at IMDb, URL accessed 13 January 2006
