= The Gabby Hayes Show =

Children's television show

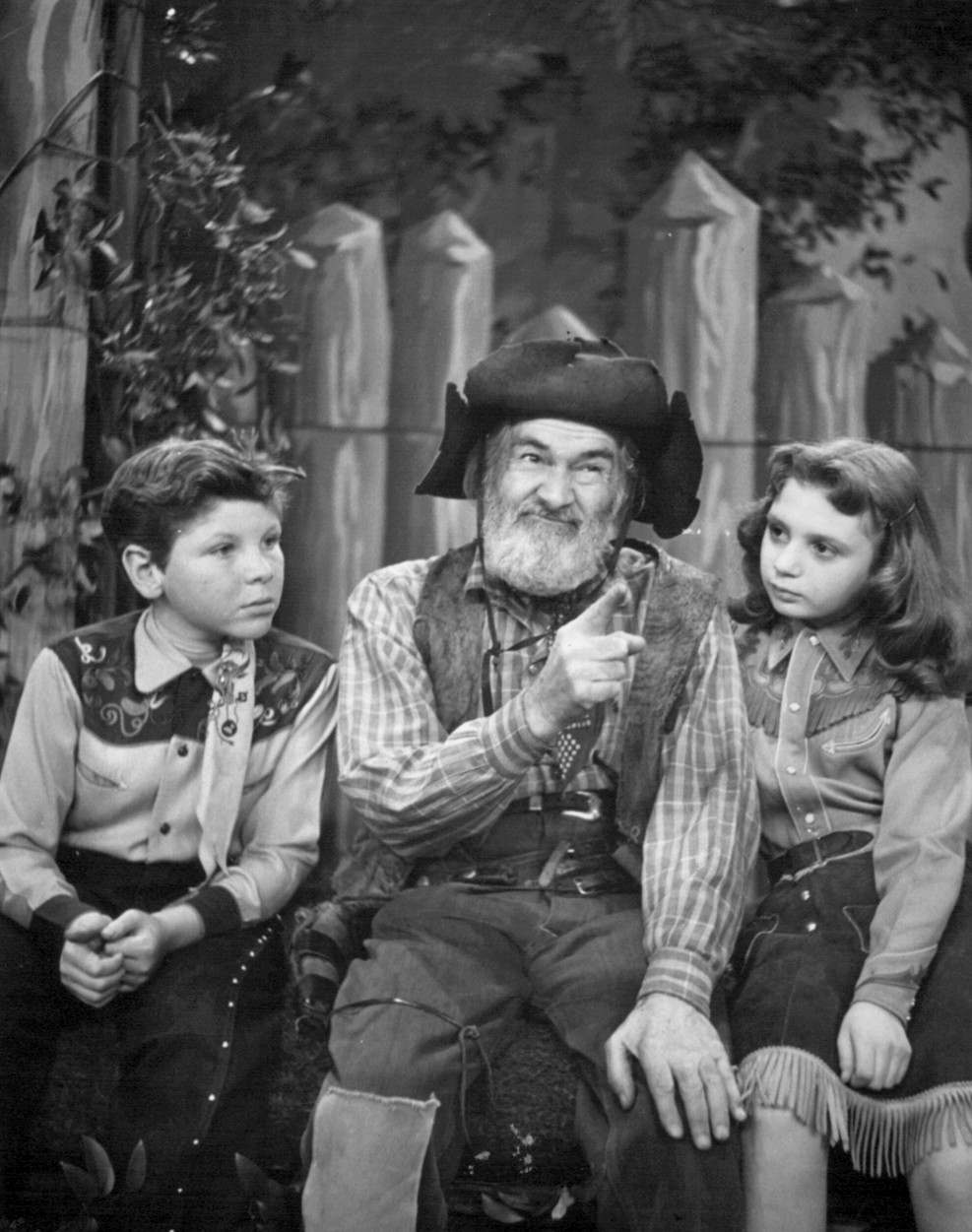
- Clifford Sales, Gabby Hayes, Lee Graham on Sunday history series
- Also known as: The Quaker Oats Show
- Genre: Children's television series; Western
- Written by: Jerome Coopersmith; Horton Foote
- Directed by: Vincent J. Donehue
- Presented by: Gabby Hayes
- Country of origin: United States

Production
- Running time: 15 and 30 minutes

Original release
- Network: NBC
- Release: October 15, 1950 – January 1, 1956

The Gabby Hayes Show is the name given to two early children's television series. Both series were broadcast on NBC, and both were sponsored by the Quaker Oats Company.

Gabby Hayes was the host of a series that featured history stories. He also introduced another program that showed scenes from old western films.

In 1953, The Gabby Hayes Show was nominated for an Emmy Award in the category of outstanding children's program, but lost to Time for Beany.

== Sunday history series ==
The series, originally titled The Quaker Oats Show, debuted on October 15, 1950. The series' title was changed in 1951. The live half-hour show was about historical events, and host Gabby Hayes would be seen in a general store in "Quaker Canyon." He would tell humorous stories for the benefit of Clifford Sales and Lee Graham, two "pleasingly natural children."

The history-based stories were written by Horton Foote and Jerome Coopersmith and were filmed in NBC's Studio 3A at Rockefeller Center. Each episode had a budget of $5,500, and costs were kept low by using stock sets. In 1950 the series was seen in 39 cities.

Some of the earliest episodes were on the Lewis and Clark Expedition, the Battle of the Alamo, Buffalo Bill as a youngster, John Paul Jones, and Thanksgiving. In January 1952 Ross Martin played Wyatt Earp, and the following week Betty Garde played Belle Starr. A January 27, 1952 newspaper column stated that the Sunday Gabby Hayes series had been cancelled.

== Weekday western film series ==
On December 11, 1951 a fifteen-minute weekday series entitled The Gabby Hayes Show began on NBC, starting at 5:15 p.m. This series originally aired on Mondays, Wednesdays and Fridays, but was later shown five days a week, from Mondays through Fridays.

In the series Hayes told tales about his eccentric relatives, and then scenes from an old B western film was shown. Since it was a fifteen-minute show each film had to be spread out over several days. Hayes would tell another tall tale at the end of the episode.

This weekday series ran until January 1, 1954.

A young Fred Rogers worked as a floor manager on this show prior to returning to Pittsburgh to work for the first public television station WQED.

== Re-edited western film series ==
After NBC's weekday series ended multiple episodes were edited into 25-minute versions which presented scenes from an entire western film. There were 52 of the longer episodes created.

ABC television showed the half-hour version of the series on Saturdays from 5:30 to 6:00 p.m. starting on May 12, 1956, and ending July 14, 1956. The series was then syndicated, and aired on individual stations until at least 1959.

== Media Availability ==
On April 25, 2006, Alpha Video released Region 0 (world-wide) DVDs of the half-hour western film version of The Gabby Hayes Show.
