= Concerning Miss Marlowe =

American TV daytime serial (1954–1955)

- Genre: Serial
- Written by: John Pickard; Frank Provo
- Directed by: Larry White
- Starring: Louise Allbritton; Helen Shields
- Country of origin: United States
- Original language: English
- No. of seasons: 1

Production
- Producer: Tom McDermott

Original release
- Network: NBC
- Release: July 5, 1954 – July 1, 1955

Related
- It Pays to Be Married

Concerning Miss Marlowe is an American daytime television serial that was broadcast on NBC from July 5, 1954, until July 1, 1955.

== Plot ==
The title character was 40-year-old Maggie Marlowe, whose husband succumbed to pneumonia shortly before the birth of their daughter. The impoverished mother allowed her in-laws to take the child to be raised by them. Returning to her acting career, she fell in love with a married man and tried to restore relations with her estranged daughter. By April 1955, Marlowe was no longer an actress; she had become "a middle-class housefrau with a tacky smock and a worry for every gray hair in her little head."

== Sponsor and promotion ==
Procter & Gamble initially sponsored the program "on an alternate-day basis". In September 1955, the company held a Talent Discovery contest with the show's star, director, and producer as judges. Miles Laboratories became a sponsor in the fall of 1954.

The serial originated at WNBT-TV in New York City. It was replaced by It Pays to Be Married.

== Personnel ==
Characters in Concerning Miss Marlowe and the actors and actresses who portrayed them are shown in the table below.

Character	Actor/actress
Margaret Marlowe	Louise Allbritton; Helen Shields
Bill Cook	John Raby
James Gavin	Efrem Zimbalist, Jr.
Louise Gavin	Jane Seymour
Dot Clayton	Helen Shields
Marian Cahill	Elaine Rost
Linda Cabot	Sarah Burton
Harry Clayton	John Gibson
Cindy Clayton	Patricia Bosworth
Tommy Clayton	Eddie Brian
Hugh Fraser	Lauren Gilbert
Jean Guthrie	Barbara Townsend
Adorno	Monty Banks, Jr.
Bojalina	Ross Martin
Jenny	Katharine Raht

Hugh James was the announcer. Tom McDermott was the producer, and Larry White was the director. John Pickard and Frank Provo were the writers.
