= The World of Mr. Sweeney =

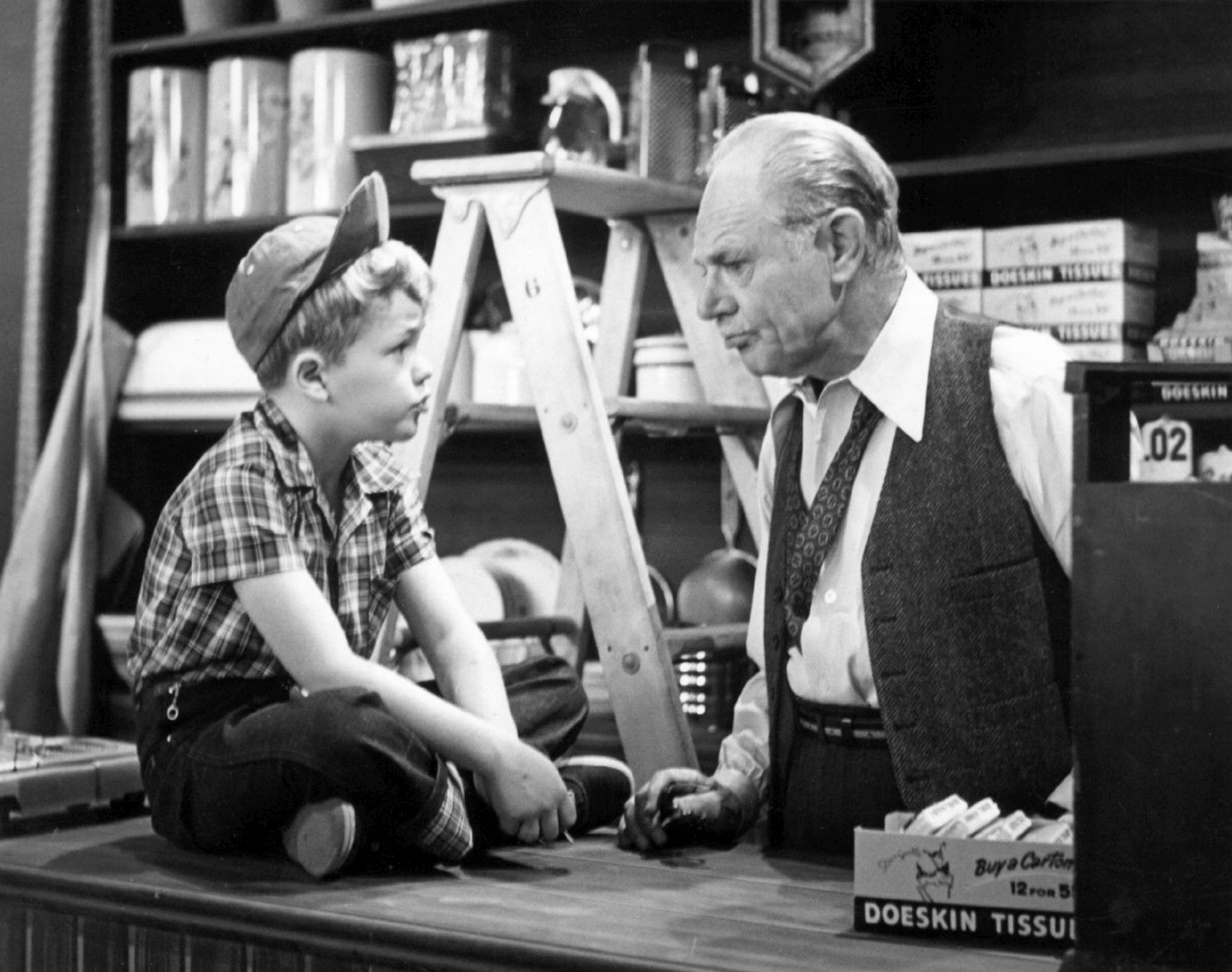
- Ruggles as Mr. Sweeney and his grandson, Kippy, played by Glenn Walken, at the general store.
- Starring: Charlie Ruggles
- Country of origin: United States
- Original language: English
- No. of episodes: 345

Original release
- Network: NBC
- Release: June 30, 1954 – December 1955

The World of Mr. Sweeney is an American sitcom that aired on NBC in primetime and daytime. The series first aired live in primetime from June 30 to August 20, 1954, four nights a week from Tuesday to Friday, and from October 1954 to December 1955 five days a week in daytime. A total of 345 episodes were produced. The series began as a segment on The Kate Smith Evening Hour in October 1953. The primetime episodes were the summer replacement for Eddie Fisher's and Dinah Shore's programs.

== Plot ==
The series focused on Cicero P. Sweeney, the owner of a small town general store, who always provided advice to his customers. Sweeney's grown daughter, Marge Franklin, and her young son, Kippy, lived with him. Stories revolved around members of the community and Sweeney's solutions to their problems.

== Cast ==
- Charlie Ruggles as Cicero P. Sweeney
- Glenn Walken as Kippy Franklin
- Helen Wagner as Marge Franklin
