= The Ford Show =

Television series

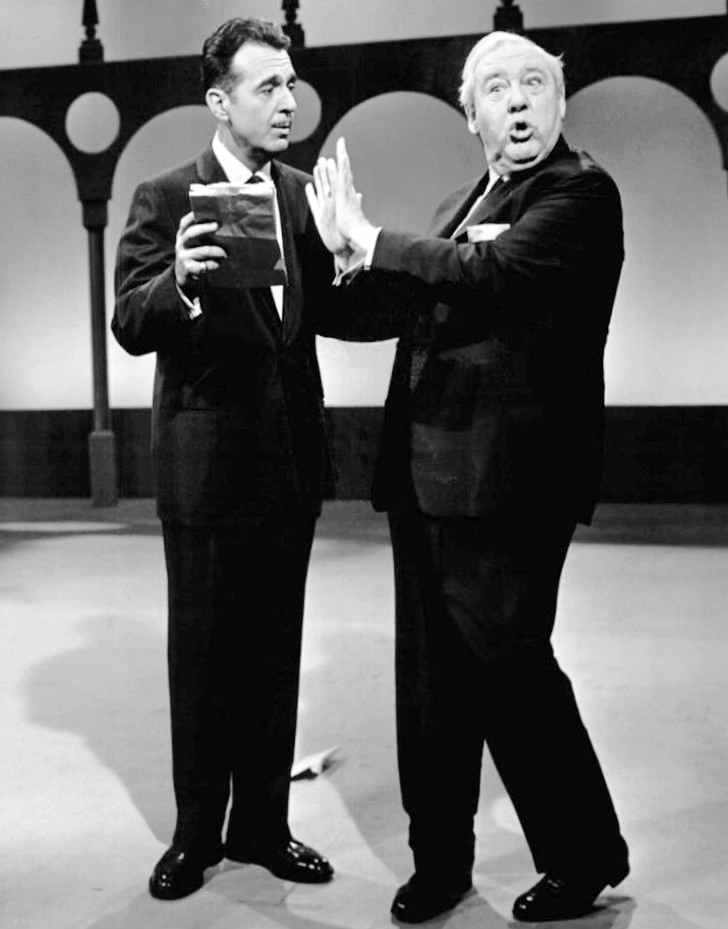
- Tennessee Ernie Ford asks his guest star, Charles Laughton, to read a poem from the "brown paper bag" poet, Fred Wobbly.
- Also known as: The Ford Show, Starring Tennessee Ernie Ford; The Tennessee Ernie Ford Show
- Genre: Variety
- Written by: Norman Lear; Roland Kibbee
- Directed by: Bud Yorkin
- Starring: Tennessee Ernie Ford
- Composer: Harry Geller's Orchestra
- Country of origin: United States
- Original language: English
- No. of seasons: 5
- No. of episodes: 121

Production
- Producer: Bud Yorkin
- Camera setup: Multi-camera
- Running time: 25 minutes

Original release
- Network: NBC
- Release: October 4, 1956 – June 29, 1961

The Ford Show (also known as The Ford Show, Starring Tennessee Ernie Ford and The Tennessee Ernie Ford Show) is an American variety program starring singer and folk humorist Tennessee Ernie Ford, which aired on NBC on Thursday evenings from October 4, 1956, to June 29, 1961. The show was sponsored by the Ford Motor Company, whose founders shared a last name with the host but had no known relation.

Beginning in September 1958, the show was telecast in color, and was broadcast from NBC Studios in Burbank, California. It was also one of the first places that showed Charles M. Schulz's Peanuts characters in animated form, which was directed by Bill Melendez, and became one of the most popular segments of his show.

== Selected guest stars ==
- Ben Alexander
- Cliff Arquette
- Reginald Gardiner
- Lloyd Bridges
- Sally Brophy
- Terry Burnham
- Allen Case
- Hoagy Carmichael
- Andy Devine
- Robert Horton
- Gordon MacRae
- Lee Marvin
- Darren McGavin
- Tom Nolan
- John Payne
- Cesar Romero
- Roger Smith
- Mickey Spillane
- Craig Stevens
- Guy Williams
- Charles Laughton
- Jo Stafford
- Shari Lewis
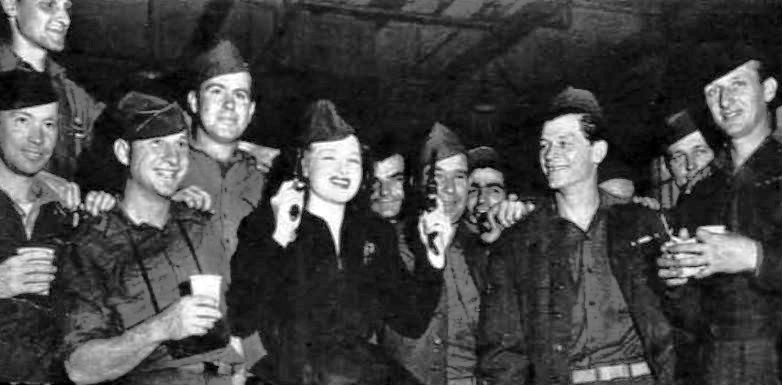
Jo Stafford in 1946, who was working on The Ford Show at the time, was a favorite of servicemen. She went to the dock to meet the Queen Mary to welcome the men back to the U.S., where they nicknamed her "GI Jo".

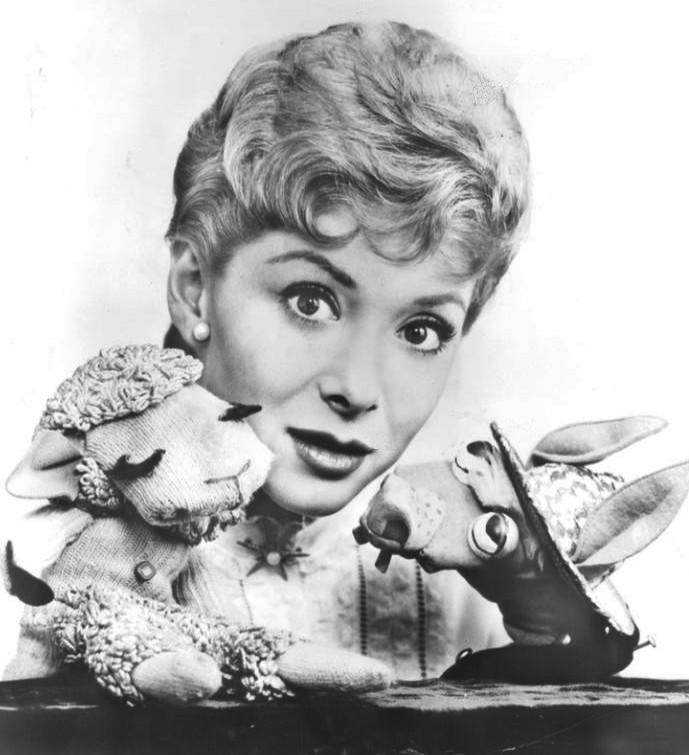
Photo of Shari Lewis and her puppets Lamb Chop and Charlie Horse from The Ford Show in 1960.

== Production notes ==
The Ford Show was produced and directed by Bud Yorkin. Television icon Norman Lear was also a writer on The Ford Show, though he has claimed that Roland Kibbee was in fact the show's main writer and that he merely wrote the opening monologues. Lear has also stated that both Yorkin and Kibbee were in charge on the show's production. The program was officially named not for the host, but for the show's sponsor, the Ford Motor Company.

== See also ==
- For other TV series sponsored by Ford Motor Company, see Ford Television Theatre, Ford Startime, Ford Festival, and Ford Star Jubilee
