= The Big Payoff =

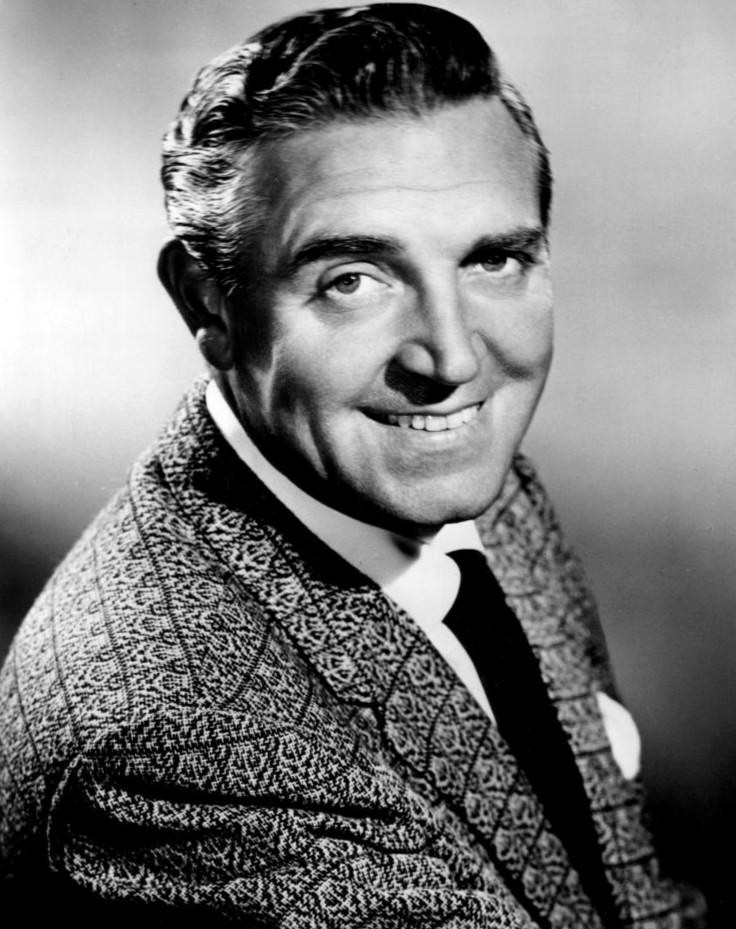
- Robert Paige as the show host, 1957.
- Directed by: Paul Alter
- Presented by: Randy Merriman; Bob Paige; Bert Parks with Bess Myerson
- Announcer: Ralph Paul; Mort Laurence
- Country of origin: United States

Production
- Running time: 30 minutes

Original release
- Network: NBC (Dec. 31, 1951 – Mar. 27, 1953); CBS (Mar. 30, 1953 – Oct. 23, 1959); Syndicated (daily, 1962)
- Release: December 31, 1951 – 1962

The Big Payoff is a daytime and primetime game show that premiered on NBC in 1951, and ended its network run on CBS in 1959. It had a brief syndication revival in 1962. NBC used The Big Payoff to replace the fifteen-minute soap opera Miss Susan, which starred Susan Peters, which had gone off the air in December 1951. The sponsors moved the show from NBC to CBS effective March 30, 1953.

Over its eight-year run plus syndication, the show had three hosts. The first was Randy Merriman (from 1951–1957), who left after claiming that CBS was in breach of his contract. Bob Paige took his place from 1957–1959. He was followed by a short stint by Bert Parks (1959). In October 1959 CBS removed the show along with all of its other quiz shows out of abundance of caution; it stated it could not ensure the shows were produced honestly in the wake of the quiz show scandals of the late 1950s.

Contestants were selected from men who mailed in letters explaining why the women in their lives deserved prizes. The men were asked four questions (delivered on a silver tray by "Question Girl" Susan Sayers) in order to win prizes like a mink coat or a vacation. Late in the network run, the format changed to three competing couples playing a guessing game. The couple with the highest score answered the Big Payoff question. For the 1962 revival, there were only two couples.

On Tuesdays, the format changed to the "Little Big Payoff" in which children sent in a letter in which they voiced the reason that they should appear. Four questions were asked, and prizes awarded for each correct answer.

Winning contestants (other than the children) had the opportunity to answer one final question. Getting this question correct, the individual was awarded the "big payoff" of a mink coat or a trip to Europe, or both. Bess Myerson modeled the mink coat for several years.

The theme song was "A Pretty Girl Is Like a Melody" by Irving Berlin, and the sponsor was Revlon.

== Other cast ==
- Models - Susan Sayers, Pat Conlon, Phyllis Hunt, Nancy Walters, Marion James, Beverly Bentley, Pat Conway, Fran Miller, Bess Myerson, Cindy Robbins
- Singers - Betty Ann Grove, Denise Lor, Judy Lynn ("The Burt Buhram Trio")
