= House Party (radio and TV show) =

- Sam Berman's 1947 caricature of Art Linkletter
- Also known as: Art Linkletter's House Party; The Linkletter Show
- Genre: Variety/Talk show
- Presented by: Art Linkletter
- Country of origin: United States
- Original language: English

Production
- Running time: 15 minutes/30 minutes
- Production companies: John Guedel Productions (1945–1969); Screen Gems (1952–1969)

Original release
- Network: CBS Radio (1945–1948), ABC Radio (1949), CBS Radio (1950–1967), CBS Television (1952–1969)
- Release: January 15, 1945 – September 5, 1969

House Party is an American radio daytime variety/talk show that aired on CBS Radio and on ABC Radio from January 15, 1945 to October 13, 1967. The show also had a long run on CBS Television as Art Linkletter's House Party and, in its final season, The Linkletter Show, airing from September 1, 1952 to September 5, 1969.

The series was launched when producer John Guedel learned that an ad agency wanted to do a new daytime audience participation show, and he pitched a series that would star Art Linkletter. Asked to provide an outline, Guedel and Linkletter came up with a format that would give Linkletter great freedom and allow for spontaneity.

== Broadcast history ==
=== Radio ===
Sponsored by General Electric, the 25-minute House Party originated from Columbia Square in Hollywood and premiered on CBS Radio on January 15, 1945. During its first run it was heard weekdays at 4 p.m., three days a week, through January 10, 1947. Following a break, it then ran weekdays at 3:30 p.m. from December 1, 1947 to December 31, 1948. It continued to be sponsored by General Electric even as it switched to ABC Radio, where it ran for 30 minutes in the same timeslot from January 3 to July 1, 1949. ABC then aired it as a 25-minute sustaining program, weekdays at noon from September 19 to December 30, 1949.

The show returned to CBS Radio only days later, making its longest continued run from January 2, 1950 to October 13, 1967 as a 30-minute show running weekdays at various times. Sponsors included Pillsbury from 1950 to 1952, and Lever Brothers from 1952 to 1956. During its first season, the soundtrack from the TV show was run immediately on radio following the telecast.

=== Television ===
Linkletter and Guedel first spun off the format to television with the prime-time ABC show Life with Linkletter, which ran October 6, 1950 to April 25, 1952. Under the title Art Linkletter's House Party, the show premiered on CBS Television on September 1, 1952, and had become television's longest-running daytime variety show by the time it completed its run on September 5, 1969. The show ran first at 2:45 pm ET for only fifteen minutes, but by February 1953 it aired from 2:30 pm to 3:00 pm ET, remaining in that time slot for 15 years. From 1968 to 1969, the show aired as a morning show titled The Linkletter Show. Linkletter had a similar but unrelated prime-time TV series, The Art Linkletter Show, on NBC television from February 18 to September 16, 1963.

The CBS program originated from KNXT. Sponsors were Pillsbury, Green Giant canned vegetables, Kellogg cereals, and Lever Brothers. John Guedel was the producer, Marty Hill was the director, and Jack Slattery was the announcer.

Following CBS' cancellation of the daytime TV show, NBC Television revived the old ABC series Life With Linkletter, this time co-hosted by Linkletter and his son Jack Linkletter. This aired on weekday afternoons from December 29, 1969, to September 25, 1970.

A new, syndicated version of the show, called House Party with Steve Doocy, ran during 1990.

== Synopsis ==
Hosted by Linkletter, House Party featured everything from household hints to hunts for missing heirs. A humorous monologue by Linkletter could be followed by an audience participation quiz to win prizes, musical groups, informal celebrity interviews and guest speakers from assorted walks of life. One popular long running feature of the program was "Guess What's In The House", a game in which studio audience members would be given clues to the contents of a small model of a split level home placed on a center stage podium. A similar concept was later adapted for the "What's Inside The Box" segment on the game show Let's Make a Deal. Ideas for the show were devised by producer John Guedel and his father, Walter, but Linkletter never used scripts or rehearsed.

The show's best-remembered segment was "Kids Say the Darndest Things", in which Linkletter interviewed schoolchildren between the ages of five and ten. During the segment's 27-year run, Linkletter interviewed an estimated 23,000 children. The popularity of the segment led to a TV series with the same title hosted by Bill Cosby on CBS from January 1998 to June 2000, and a revival since 2019.

== Books ==
1957 edition illustrated by Charles Schulz

The show's popularity led to the books Kids Say the Darndest Things (Prentice-Hall, 1957) with House Party mentioned in the front cover blurb. It was followed by Kids Still Say the Darndest Things! (Bernard Geis, 1961), both illustrated by Peanuts cartoonist Charles M. Schulz. The 1957 book was reissued in 2005 by Ten Speed Press (ISBN 1-5876-1249-6, ISBN 978-1-58761-249-7)
