= The Garry Moore Show =

Name of several separate shows hosted by Garry Moore

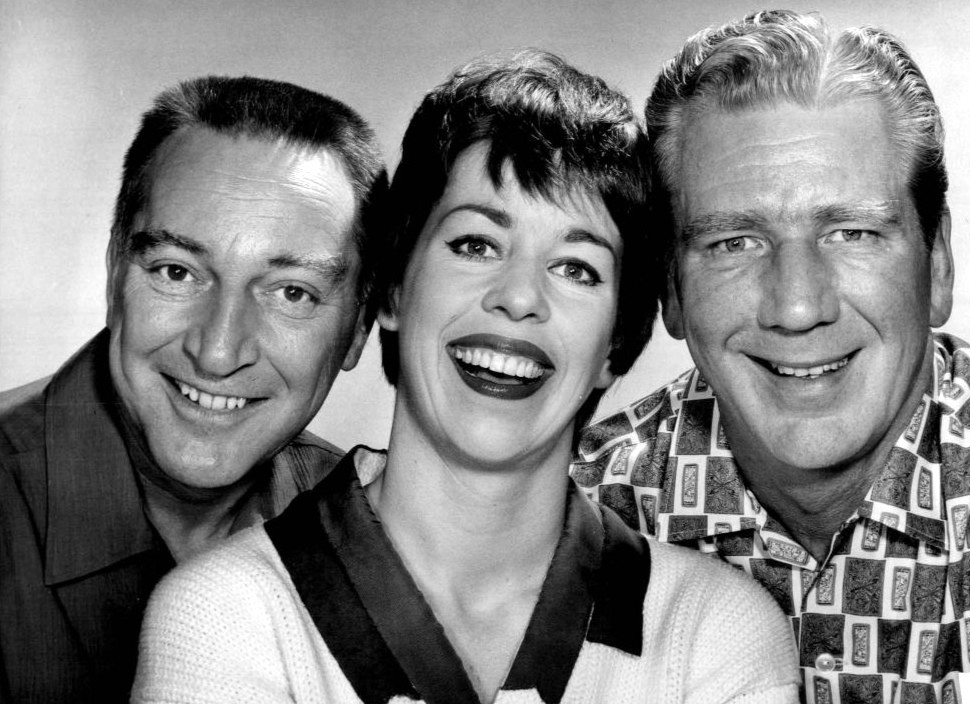
- Cast photo: Garry Moore, Carol Burnett, and Durward Kirby, 1961
- Created by: Garry Moore
- Starring: Garry Moore; Carol Burnett (1959–1962); Durward Kirby; Marion Lorne (1958–1962)
- Country of origin: United States

Production
- Running time: 30/60 minutes

Original release
- Network: CBS
- Release: June 26, 1950 – January 8, 1967

The Garry Moore Show is the name for several separate American variety series on the CBS television network in the 1950s and 1960s. Hosted by experienced radio performer Garry Moore, the series helped launch the careers of many comedic talents, such as Dorothy Loudon, Don Adams, George Gobel, Carol Burnett, Don Knotts, Lee Goodman, James Kirkwood, Jr., Lily Tomlin, and Jonathan Winters. The Garry Moore Show garnered a number of Emmy nominations and wins.

== Origins ==
The show originally started as a radio program; CBS eventually awarded Moore his own early-evening television show in its place. Durward Kirby, Moore's radio partner since 1940, made the move to TV with him and appeared throughout all three versions of the TV show.

== Original version (1950–1958) ==
The first incarnation of the show began in June 1950 as a Monday-through-Friday, 30-minute evening series. It was also simulcast on radio. The show changed to a once-weekly, one-hour format by August. The primetime edition, titled The Garry Moore Evening Show, alternated with The George Burns and Gracie Allen Show on Thursday nights from September through December 1951.

In the fall of 1950, Moore moved to a daytime show on CBS, at first in the early afternoon and later in midmorning. The series featured a relaxed and flexible combination of comedy skits, monologues, singing, and interaction with the studio audience. It was an important commercial success for CBS, and it ran in this format until mid-1958.

On October 6, 1952, the program was cut from an hour to 30 minutes, still beginning at 1:30 pm Eastern Time but ending at 2 pm rather than the previous 2:30 ending. It originated at WCBS-TV in New York City.

== Second version (1958–1964) ==
In 1958, Moore ended the previous show because of his demanding work schedule, but he returned in the fall with a weekly, hour-long evening series, with the same title and similar format. Allen Funt's Candid Camera segments became a regular feature of this series, along with a lengthy recap segment titled "That Wonderful Year". In 1959, Moore produced two LP records on the Warner Bros. label: That Wonderful Year, 1930 and That Wonderful Year, 1940. In its first season, this version of The Garry Moore Show faced competition on NBC from the drama series The Californians and the ABC crime/police show Confession, hosted by Jack Wyatt.

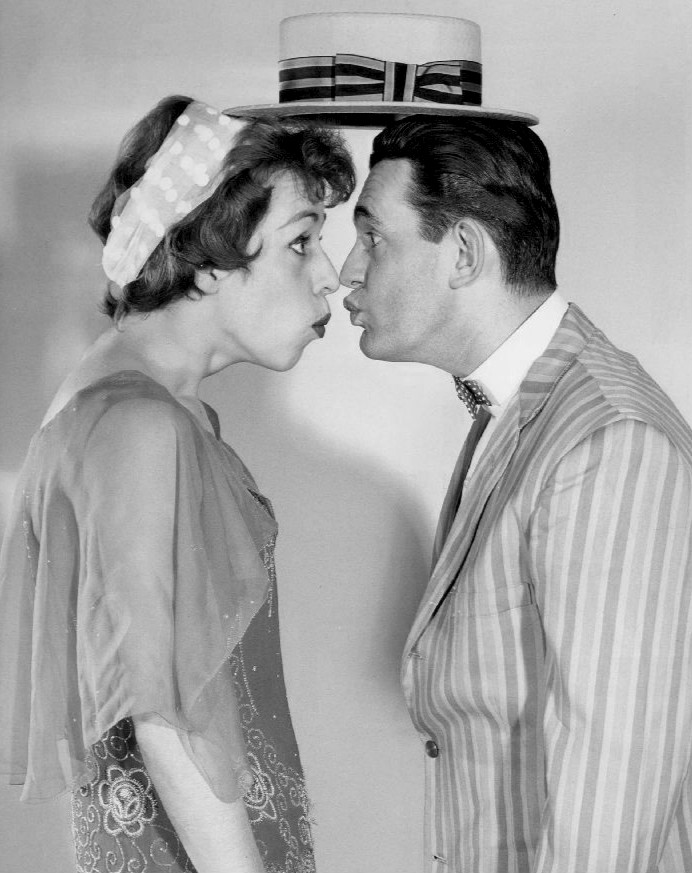
Larry Blyden with Carol Burnett, 1960

The show was taped every Friday evening at CBS Studio 50 (later renamed the Ed Sullivan Theater) and was broadcast the following Tuesday night. The cast of the second version included Marion Lorne (who appeared as her other Broadway and acting commitments permitted throughout this run) and rising star Carol Burnett (1959–62), who honed her comedic skills for her own future successful variety show. In addition to the performances of the cast and guests, vocal performers included the George Becker Singers and the dancers under the choreography of Ernest Flatt, including lead dancer Don Crichton.

Bob Banner was the executive producer, Joe Hamilton (Burnett's future husband) was series producer, and Irwin Kostal was the orchestra leader. David "Dave" Geisel was the director.

In the summer of 1960, the series was replaced for nine weeks by the drama Diagnosis: Unknown. The Garry Moore Show was removed from the CBS line-up in 1964, at Moore's request, to allow him to take a long-needed vacation, which lasted more than two years.

== Final version (1966–1967) ==
Moore returned with yet another version of the show in the fall of 1966; this time, it was in color. Due to competition from Bonanza on NBC, the show was cancelled after only four months. It was replaced on the CBS schedule by The Smothers Brothers Comedy Hour.

== Episodes on DVD ==
As of 2012, at least four episodes of the second version of the show are available on DVD.

- The Garry Moore Show Presents: A Carol Burnett Christmas (2012) features the Christmas episodes from 1959, 1960, and 1961. Guests included Mahalia Jackson and Henry Morgan (1959), Jonathan Winters and Louise O'Brien (1960), and Julie Andrews and Gwen Verdon (1961). The 1961 show includes Julie's earliest televised recording of "My Favorite Things", three years before filming The Sound of Music.
- The Carol Burnett Show: Carol's Favorites (2012) includes as a bonus feature the March 6, 1962, episode where Burnett, playing Supergirl, delivers her first televised "Tarzan yell". The episode guests included Alan King and Barbara McNair, and a peek at the end credits shows how many of the production and writing staff on whom she relied during her own show came from those with whom she worked on The Garry Moore Show.
