= Barker Bill's Cartoon Show =

- Genre: Animation
- Country of origin: United States
- Original language: English

Production
- Running time: 15 minutes
- Production company: Terrytoons

Original release
- Network: CBS
- Release: 1953 – 1955

Barker Bill's Cartoon Show is the first network television weekday cartoon series, airing on CBS from 1953 to 1955. The 15 minute show was broadcast twice a week, Wednesdays and Fridays, at 5pm Eastern, although some local stations showed both episodes together as a single 30 minute show.

== Plot ==
Barker Bill was a portly circus ringmaster with a long black handlebar mustache and dressed in the traditional costume - a fancy suit with white gloves and a top hat.

The show was hosted by a stationary picture of the Barker Bill character with an off-camera announcer introducing the cartoons. The show featured old black and white cartoons obtained from Terrytoons. These were mostly older cartoons from the 1930s, like Farmer Al Falfa and Kiko the Kangaroo, not the more current and better known series such as Mighty Mouse and Heckle and Jeckle.

== Comic strip adaptation ==
Barker Bill did not appear in cartoons, but was briefly featured in a newspaper comic strip series from September 1954 to 1955.

== CBS purchases Terrytoons and its library ==
Terrytoons was the first major animation studio to give television a license to show its library of old black and white cartoons. The Barker Bill series was so successful that CBS offered to buy the Terrytoons studio, including its production facilities and library of cartoons. Paul Terry accepted the offer and retired in 1955.

This brought well-known Terrytoons characters Mighty Mouse, Heckle and Jeckle and others to television, replacing the Barker Bill series in 1956. The color cartoons were originally broadcast in black and white, but were still suitable when television switched to color and continued to be part of CBS programming until the 1980s.

== Syndication ==
The older cartoons from the Barker Bill show were re-packaged for syndication under various titles, including Farmer Alfalfa and His Terrytoons Pals, The Terry Toons Club, and Terry Toons Circus.
