= Strike It Rich (1947 game show) =

American radio and television game show

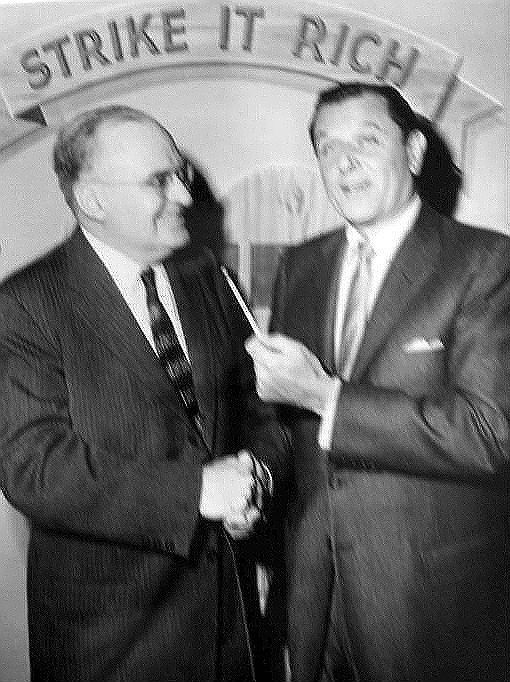
- Country of origin: United States
- Language: English
- Home station: CBS (1947–1950); NBC Radio (1950–1957)
- TV adaptations: CBS (1951–1958)
- Hosted by: Todd Russell; Warren Hull
- Original release: June 9, 1947 – January 3, 1958

Strike It Rich was a game show that was broadcast on American radio from June 29, 1947, to December 27, 1957, on CBS and NBC. It was broadcast on television as well, starting in 1951. Billed as “The quiz show with a heart”, people in need of money (such as for medical treatment or a destitute family) appeared and told their tale of woe, then tried to win money by answering four questions. If the contestant did not win any money, the emcee opened the "Heart Line", which was a phone line to viewers who wished to donate to the contestant's family.

The radio series aired on CBS from 1947 to 1950. On May 1, 1950, the show moved to NBC, and was broadcast by NBC until December 27, 1957. Todd Russell was the host from 1947 to 1948, followed by Warren Hull.

The television version of the game show premiered May 7, 1951, on CBS's daytime lineup. It ran until January 3, 1958, including a prime time version which aired from July 4, 1951, to January 12, 1955.

== Premise ==
Strike It Rich was a game show that aired on American radio and television 1947 to 1957 on CBS and NBC. People in need of money (such as for medical treatment or a destitute family) appeared and told their tale of woe, then tried to win money by answering four relatively easy questions. Each player would be given $30 and bet any of their bankroll on answering each question after being given the category. If the contestant didn't win any money, the emcee opened the "Heart Line", a telephone hotline for viewers who wished to donate to the contestant and their family.

In 1957 the TV version of the program removed a cap on the amount a person could earn in one appearance. Before the change a contestant could win at most $500 by answering four questions correctly. The revision provided a chance to answer a fifth question with no loss of money if the answer was wrong. A correct answer of the fifth question enabled the person to return on the next episode to continue playing.

== Original broadcast run ==
Sponsored by Luden's Cough Drops, the radio series aired on CBS from June 29, 1947, to April 30, 1950. Todd Russell was the host from 1947 to 1948, followed by Warren Hull. On May 1, 1950, the show moved to NBC, where it aired on weekdays, sponsored by Colgate, until December 27, 1957.

The television series premiered May 7, 1951, on CBS's daytime lineup and ran until January 3, 1958. Its popularity led CBS to air a prime time version from July 4, 1951, to January 12, 1955. The nighttime version finished #25 in the Nielsen ratings for the 1951–1952 season and #21 for 1952–1953.

Two attempts to revive the series were made in 1973 and 1978, although neither was successful. Another quiz show in 1986 used the same name but was otherwise unrelated.

=== Episode status ===
Recordings of the series were destroyed, partly owing to network standards of the era and partly owing to its controversial nature. Four episodes are held at the UCLA Film and Television Archive, and a few are held by the Paley Center for Media. The J. Fred & Leslie W. MacDonald Collection of the Library of Congress has one kinescoped program from November 28, 1956.

== Reception ==
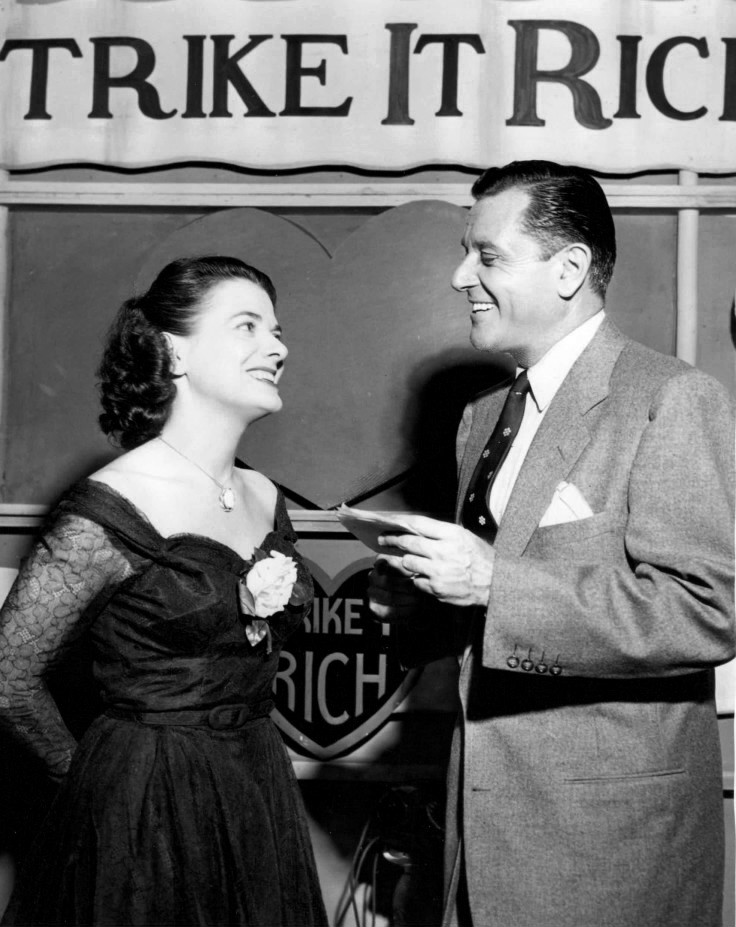
Jane Wilson stands in for a contestant in the "Helping Hand" segment, 1952.

=== Controversy ===
While it had a simple format, the show was controversial during the 11 years it aired. Some applauded Strike It Rich for helping out some less fortunate people, as well as showcasing the sincere charity and goodwill of viewers who donated through the Heart Line. Others found it a sickening spectacle that exploited the less fortunate contestants for the vicarious thrills of the viewers and the selfish gain of the sponsors.

Part of the criticism was that it promised more than it could deliver. Though the show received between 3,000 and 5,000 letters per week from needy people wishing to win what would be (to them) life-changing sums of money, only a small fraction of those could be selected. Although this was partly due to the limits of television production (the series, although ambitious in its goals, could not reasonably assist every person needing help at the same time), critics stated that the show picked mostly those thought to have the most interesting tales of woe.

==== Complaints ====
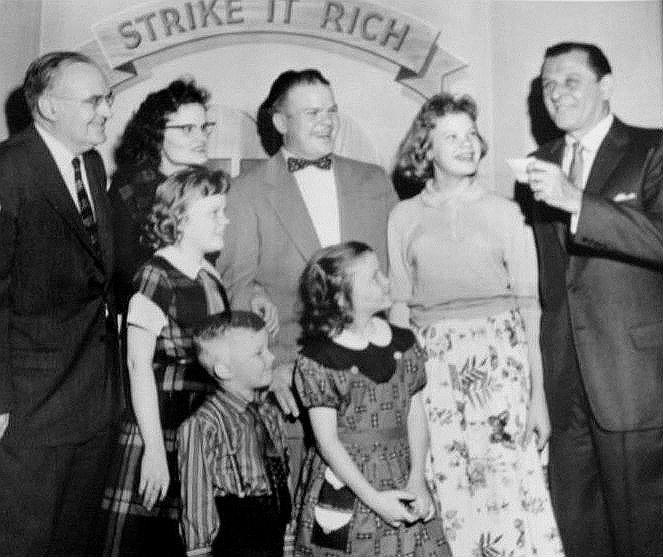
Hull (left) with contestants from Pittsburgh and Atkinson (right).

Despite warnings by the show's producers, a number of people hoping to be contestants exhausted their money to travel to New York, only to be rejected and end up relying on charities such as the Salvation Army to help them return home. This led to a large number of complaints from charities and local government agencies:

- The New York City commissioner of welfare called Strike It Rich "a disgusting spectacle and a national disgrace." The welfare commissioner brought the show to court on charges of unlicensed fund-raising and actually won a conviction.
- The supervisor of the Travelers Aid Society said, "Putting human misery on display can hardly be called right."
- The general director of the Family Service Association of America said flatly, "Victims of poverty, illness, and everyday misfortune should not be made a public spectacle or seemingly to be put in the position of begging for charity."
- The New York legislature looked into the controversy, but later dropped it, claiming it "lacked jurisdiction."
- TV Guide called it "a despicable travesty on the very nature of charity."

==== Networks' response ====
CBS and NBC remained unconcerned over the charity controversy, stating: "We don't want to do anything that would antagonize the sponsor." Statements such as this allowed companies such as Geritol and Revlon to continue to control all aspects of the shows they sponsored. Strike It Rich last aired on CBS daytime in its 11:30 am time slot on Friday, January 3, 1958. It was replaced on Monday, January 6 by a new game show named Dotto. Dotto would go on to become the highest rated daytime show of the 1950s until its cancellation seven months later, the first casualty of the 1950s quiz show scandals.

== Merchandise ==
A board game of Strike it Rich featuring host Warren Hull on the cover was released by Lowell Toy Mfg. in 1956.
