= The Bob Crosby Show =

American TV show (1953–1957)

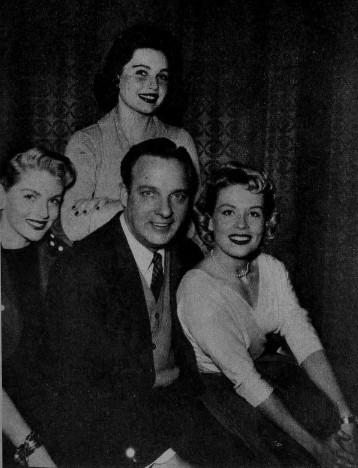
- Singers Joan O'Brien, Cathy Crosby and Carol Richards with Bob Crosby
- Genre: Variety
- Starring: Bob Crosby; Joan O'Brien; Cathy Crosby; Carol Richards; The Modernaires
- Country of origin: United States
- Original language: English

Original release
- Network: CBS
- Release: September 14, 1953 – August 30, 1957

The Bob Crosby Show
- Genre: Variety
- Starring: Bob Crosby; Gretchen Wyler; The Clay Warnick Singers; The Peter Gennaro Dancers
- Country of origin: United States
- Original language: English

Production
- Producer: Louis DaPron

Original release
- Network: NBC
- Release: June 14 – September 6, 1958

The Bob Crosby Show can refer to either of two television programs in the United States. One was broadcast in the afternoons on CBS September 14, 1953 – August 30, 1957. The other was broadcast in prime time on NBC June 14, 1958 – September 6, 1958, as a summer replacement for Perry Como's show.

== Personnel ==
Singer/bandleader Bob Crosby was the host and star of both programs. Other entertainers on the CBS version included Joan O'Brien, Cathy Crosby and The Modernaires. The announcers were Steve Dunne and Jack Narz. Crosby's Bobcats orchestra provided instrumental music. The NBC program featured Gretchen Wyler, The Clay Warnick Singers and The Peter Gennaro Dancers. Carl Hoff led the orchestra, and the producer was Louis DaPron.

== Recognition ==
Readers of TV Radio Mirror magazine named The Bob Crosby Show their favorite television daytime variety program for 1954–1955. In 1955, the show was nominated for an Emmy Award for Outstanding Program Achievement In Daytime.

== Recording ==
Columbia Records issued a Bob Crosby Show album (CL 766), featuring Crosby, Paula Kelly and Carol Richards.
