= The Brighter Day =

American soap opera

- Created by: Irna Phillips
- Written by: Sam Hall
- Starring: Mike Barton; Walter Brooke; Mona Bruns
- Country of origin: United States

Production
- Executive producer: Irna Phillips
- Running time: 15 minutes

Original release
- Network: NBC Radio
- Release: 1948 – 1956
- Network: CBS
- Release: January 4, 1954 – September 28, 1962

The Brighter Day is an American daytime soap opera that aired on CBS from January 4, 1954, to September 28, 1962. Originally created for NBC Radio by Irna Phillips in 1948, the radio and television versions ran simultaneously from 1954–56. Set in New Hope, Wisconsin, the series revolved around Reverend Richard Dennis and his four children, Althea, Patsy, Babby and Grayling.

The Brighter Day was the first soap opera to air on network television with an explicitly religious theme. Another soap opera created by Phillips, The Guiding Light, initially had a religious theme as a radio show but dropped it by the time the series moved to television.

== History ==
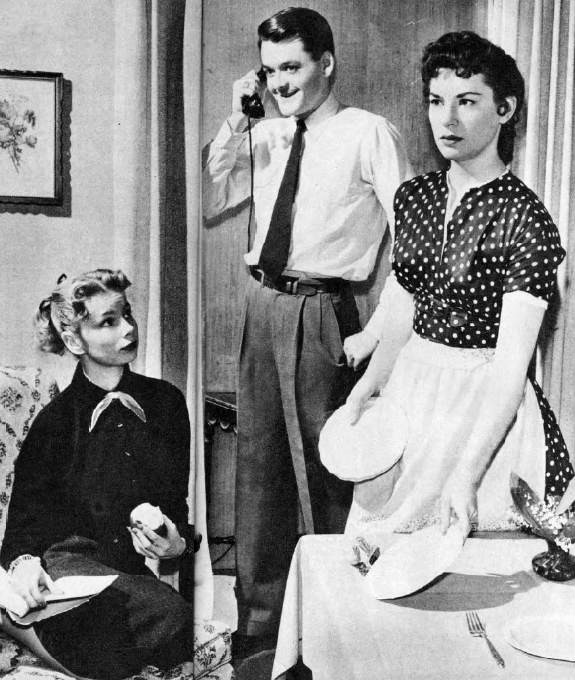
Three of the Dennis children, 1954. From left: Babby (Mary Linn Beller), Grayling (Hal Holbrook), and Patsy (Lois Nettleton).

The Brighter Day had its roots in the radio soap opera Joyce Jordan, M.D. Dr. Jordan lived near the Dennis family's hometown of Three Rivers, and listeners of the Jordan program became acquainted with the Dennises in 1948. According to Jim Cox in The Great Radio Soap Operas, "By the time Dr. Jordan said 'good-by' on her final broadcast on Friday, October 8, 1948, the fans were already acquainted with the family that would replace her. The following Monday listeners could easily connect with the new series growing out of the show they had been hearing for so long." Smoothing the transition even more, The Brighter Day's announcer, sponsor, network and time slot were the same as those of Joyce Jordan, M.D.

The original radio version took place in the town of Three Rivers, but in late 1953 the Dennis family was forced to move to New Hope as a result of a flood washing out Three Rivers. Later in the run, the Dennis family moved to Columbus, established as a college town. There were five children in the radio version, but the oldest daughter, Liz (played from 1949–1954 by actress Margaret Draper), married and left the family as the show began on television. Also living with Reverend Dennis was his widowed sister, Emily Potter.

The Brighter Day had mid-range Nielsen ratings for most of its run. During the 1950s, it was in the middle of the pack typically landing between 5th and 7th place over all and in the middle of all the CBS soaps. The show's best season was 1955–1956, when it did not have any competition from ABC and weak offerings from NBC.

With the premiere of American Bandstand in 1957 and Bandstand's surge in popularity a year later, the CBS strip of The Verdict is Yours at 3:30, The Brighter Day at 4:00, The Secret Storm at 4:15 and The Edge of Night at 4:30 all took a hit of about one rating point. Though The Secret Storm and The Edge of Night rebounded, The Brighter Day and its lead-in The Verdict Is Yours did not. By the 1960–61 season, both shows were holding their own, but had still taken a ratings hit.

In Summer 1961, Procter & Gamble gave up production of the show to CBS and moved production of the series from New York City to Los Angeles in an effort to save money. Key characters and stories were dropped when their actors did not wish to relocate. In the Summer of 1962, with The Secret Storm and The Edge of Night proving formidable against American Bandstand, CBS decided to expand The Secret Storm, creating a powerful hour-long soap block to counterprogram against American Bandstand. This decision had both The Brighter Day and The Verdict is Yours moving from their mid/late afternoon slots to mid/late morning. The timeslot change was the final nail in the coffin, as both series lost almost half their audience, with The Brighter Day falling from a 6.9 to 3.7. Mid-late morning had never been successful for serials, and this instance was no different.

In August 1962, the show made history by creating the first daytime television contract role for an African American actor. The actor, Rex Ingram, appeared as an ordained minister named Victor Graham beginning on September 17, but didn't have time to make much of an impact, as the show was cancelled two weeks later on September 28.

The network announced that the show would be cancelled with less than two weeks before the final episode aired. In the final episode, actor Paul Langton addressed the viewers in character as Uncle Walter, wrapping up the storylines and explaining how the characters would resolve their problems. Langton ended the show with a final farewell: "The microphone can't pick up their voices and soon the picture will fade. If on occasion you think of us, we hope your memory will be a pleasant one."

Among the show's writers were Doris Frankle and Sam Hall. Towards the end of the series, Agnes Nixon was hired to write the show (and had created the character on which Ada and Rachel Davis, two characters on NBC's Another World, were based), but the show was cancelled before her work was ever taped. Nixon went on to write The Guiding Light and, later, Another World, before creating her two classic soap operas on the ABC network, All My Children and One Life to Live.

Among the actors who appeared on the series, the most famous alumni are Hal Holbrook (Grayling Dennis), Lois Nettleton (Patsy Dennis Hamilton), and Patty Duke (Ellen Williams Dennis).

== See also ==
- List of radio soaps
