= Modern Romances =

American TV anthology series (1954–1958)

Modern Romances is an American anthology television series that was broadcast on NBC weekdays October 4, 1954 - September 19, 1958. In the spring of 1955 it was the network's highest-rated daytime program.

== Background ==
A Modern Romances radio program was broadcast 1936-1937 and 1949-1955, featuring adaptations of stories from Modern Romances magazine. Gertrude Wagner portrayed Helen Gregory (said to be the magazine's editor), as she hosted the show and narrated the stories.

== Overview ==
Martha Scott was the initial narrator and host for the program. She pointed out, "Modern Romances isn't soap opera stuff", adding that the stories "are well produced and acted." She said, "We're trying to bring nighttime quality to the daytime audience." In the fall of 1956, Kathi Norris replaced Scott "for at least three weeks" while Scott was on vacation. Scott left to take a role on Broadway and was succeeded by Mel Brandt, who had been the show's announcer, on November 29, 1957. Beginning with Gene Nelson on March 31, 1958, guest celebrities hosted and narrated. Other guests in those roles included Jayne Meadows, Kathryn Murray, Bob Smith, and Margaret Truman.

Each week's 15-minute episodes combined to create a five-part story. Although most stories came from Modern Romances magazine, some were original. Scott worked with writers two weeks ahead of the airing of episode, making suggestions. Actors on the series changed from week to week with each story. Many of them took roles to fill time between engagements in plays or in films. Those who appeared in episodes or as guest hosts included Ann Flood, Don Hastings, Georgann Johnson, Robert Mandan, and Mercedes McCambridge

== Stories ==
Partial List of Stories on Modern Romances
Week	Summary
October 4–8, 1955	A romantic triangle involved a married couple and an attorney. When a jealous husband was charged with robbery, he was represented by the attorney in whom he thought his wife was interested. The attorney loved the woman and had to decide whether or not to save her husband from jail.
November 14–18, 1955	Episodes focused on the success of a song. "My Treasure" was "the first original song ever commissioned for a daytime show". Connie Francis, who had recorded the song for MGM Records, performed the song live on the Friday episode, and the recording was played on the show in each of the other episodes.
February 6–10, 1956	The Rocky King Detective program was revived for the week. Actors Roscoe Karns, Earl Hammond, and Grace King returned from the original series.
January 27–31, 1958	Episodes dealt with "a celebrated composer-conductor obsessed with the notion that his daughter could be a great concert pianist." The stars were David White, Jimsey Somers, Joy Hodges, and James Cogdon.
February 24–28, 1958	Hildy Parks and Walter Brooke portrayed a couple stranded in a mountain cabin by a blizzard. Facing possible death, they dealt with their marital problems. Chris Gampel played their "strange and dangerous host".

== Production ==
Modern Romances initially was broadcast weekdays from 4:45 to 5 p.m. Eastern Time. Beginning January 2, 1956, it was moved to 4:15-4:30 p.m. E. T. Beginning July 2, 1956, it was returned to its original time, and it stayed there until it went off the air. The show was packaged by Wilbur Stark and Jerry Layton. Sponsors included 7 Up, the Culver Company, Colgate and Sterling Drug.

Scott usually appeared live on the show, but when she was making the film The Desperate Hours (1955), her appearances were filmed for 12 weeks "largely at her own expense".

== Critical response ==
Faye Emerson wrote in The Cincinnati Post, "Martha Scott has a tender, soft-eyed quality that makes her just about perfect for the role of story editor on Modern Romances." Emerson complimented the dignity and compassion that Scott projected on the program and commended the quality of episodes. She wrote, "The maudlin is kept to a minimum, and the pathos is barely noticeable."
