= Golden Windows =

American TV daytime soap opera (1954–1955)

Golden Windows is a daytime soap opera which aired on NBC from July 5, 1954 to April 1, 1955 from 3:15 to 3:30 PM/ET. The program was sponsored by Procter & Gamble, for Cheer.

== Synopsis ==
The series tells the story of Juliet Goodwin (played by Leila Martin), a 22-year-old girl who spent an isolated childhood in an island retreat off the coast of Maine with her foster father, Charles Goodwin (played by Eric Dressler), and her attempt to find happiness with Tom Anderson (played by Herb Patterson), the bitter young cynic with whom she was in love, although she was engaged to another. Julie, a girl endowed with a lovely body and a glorious voice, found that her curiosity about life and people had made her vaguely discontented with life on the idyllic island Capstan.

As the story opened, Julie discussed plans for her forthcoming marriage to her fiancé, John Brandon (played by Grant Sullivan), when a bad storm blew up and he returned to the hotel he and his mother ran on the mainland.

The following sequence of events took place in the program’s opening week: Tom Anderson, battered by the New England storm and fleeing the police on what may be a murder charge, found his way to the Goodwin house. Julie convinced her father that Tom was ill and needed their help so they put him up in the guest room for the night after he had collapsed from fatigue. On the mainland, John told his mother (played by Harriet MacGibbon) that he promised to get Julie an audition with a famous musician who was staying at their resort hotel. Meanwhile, Tom regained consciousness. There was an awareness about Tom and Julie of the growing bond between them and she promised to hide him from the police until he was stronger and could go to them with the story of his how partner was shot, and convince them he was not guilty.

The program was produced by Mary Harris, and directed by Dan Levin. The story was by John M. Young and Corlis Wilber.

Others who appeared in the program were: Ralph Camargo (father of actress Victoria Wyndham), Broadway star Barbara Cook, and Ethel Remey, who later played Alma Miller on As the World Turns.

Golden Windows was replaced on April 2, 1955, by a program starring Ted Mack.
