= Home (1954 TV series) =

- Genre: Women's interest; Talk; Magazine
- Created by: Sylvester L. Weaver Jr.
- Presented by: Arlene Francis
- Narrated by: Hugh Downs
- Composer: The Norman Paris Trio
- Country of origin: United States
- Original language: English
- No. of episodes: 893

Production
- Producers: Richard Linkroum; Ted Rogers
- Production location: New York City
- Running time: 1 hour

Original release
- Network: NBC
- Release: March 1, 1954 – August 9, 1957

Related
- The Arlene Francis Show (1957–1958); Today; Tonight

Home is an American daytime television series hosted by Arlene Francis. Intended for an audience of women, it debuted in 1954 as one of NBC's three major non-primetime shows. While the other two shows—Today and Tonight—are still being produced 60 years later, Home was cancelled in 1957.

== Format ==
Each hour-long show is presented in a series of short segments which discuss topics in a depth typical of a magazine article. A segment may be either entertaining or informational. Topics typically relate to homemaking but may also include civic, cultural, and social issues and interviews with newsmakers. Twelve minutes of each broadcast are devoted to the promotion of consumer goods from the show's sponsors; these commercials often take place within the informational segments of the show itself.

Instead of imitating the look of an actual house as cooking shows did, Home's producers made it obvious that it was taking place in a modern television studio. The $200,000 revolving set had a kitchen, a workshop, and an area to demonstrate the effects of weather on the sponsors' products. A garden area contained soil samples from each of the 48 U.S. states; an additional sample to represent Washington, D.C., was provided by Vice President Richard Nixon.

== On-air staff ==
Arlene Francis hosted the program as editor-in-chief with Hugh Downs serving as her announcer and assistant. Music was performed by the Norman Paris Trio and singer Johnny Johnston. The team of editors presenting segments on particular topics included Poppy Cannon (food), Rose Franzblau (family relations and child psychology), Eve Hunter (fashion and beauty), Sydney Smith (interior decorating), Estelle Parsons (special projects), Leona Baumgartner (health), and Will Peigelbeck (gardening and home repairs).

== History ==
NBC executive Sylvester "Pat" Weaver began planning a concept called Shopping in late 1951, intending to attract an audience of upper middle class women. Its content and segmented format were inspired by the success of women's magazines, local cooking shows, and the NBC network's Today show. By aiming for a particular target demographic, the network hoped to attract sponsors from women's magazines who would not be interested in advertising on a show meant for the masses.

Three talk shows that Weaver created (Today, Home, and Tonight) were intended to complement each other and were referred to as the "T-H-T" package. These programs helped to establish the practice of selling advertising rights to several temporary sponsors. The usual practice at the time involved a single sponsor being responsible for an entire television series.

After spending $1 million promoting Home, NBC predicted that 10% of television-equipped U.S. households would watch the program. This rating fell to about 3 by the month after Home's March 1, 1954, premiere. The network responded to these low ratings by adding more entertaining segments.

Although the series was nominated for a 1956 Emmy Award for Best Contribution to Daytime Programming, it continued to have low ratings. That same year it was moved from 11:00 a.m. to 10:00 a.m., a timeslot with less competition. In that season Home had a rating of 2.5, whereas CBS's 10:00 and 10:30 programs were at 6.5 and 7.5, respectively. The 893rd and final episode of Home was broadcast on August 9, 1957. For the following six months Francis hosted a livelier and "less restrained" talk show called The Arlene Francis Show.
