= 1952–53 United States network television schedule (daytime) =

Television program schedule

The following is the 1952–53 daytime network television schedule for the four major English-language commercial broadcast networks in the United States. It covers most of the weekday daytime hours from September 1952 to August 1953.

Talk shows are highlighted in yellow, local programming is white, reruns of prime-time programming are orange, game shows are pink, soap operas are chartreuse, news programs are gold and all others are light blue. New series are highlighted in bold.

== Fall 1952 ==
	7:00 am	7:30 am	8:00 am	8:30 am	9:00 am	9:30 am	10:00 am	10:30 am	11:00 am	11:30 am	noon	12:30 pm	1:00 pm	1:30 pm	2:00 pm	2:30 pm	3:00 pm	3:30 pm	4:00 pm	4:30 pm	5:00 pm	5:30 pm
ABC	local programming
CBS	local programming					9:30 AM: Local News; 9:45 AM: CBS Morning News (to 10:30 AM F); 10:00 am: **Wheel of Fortune** (to 11:00 AM M-Th); 10:30 AM: Arthur Godfrey Time (to 11:00 AM F); 11:00 am: **There's One in Every Family** (to 11:30 AM)				Strike It Rich	Noon: Bride and Groom 12:15 pm: Love of Life	12:30 pm: Search for Tomorrow 12:45 pm Local programming	local programming	The Garry Moore Show	**Double or Nothing** (M/W/F) Everywhere I Go (Tu/Th)	2:30 pm The Guiding Light 2:45 pm **Art Linkletter's House Party**	3:15 pm Mike and Buff		Homemaker's Exchange	The U.N. in Action	local programming
NBC	The Today Show				local programming		**Ding Dong School**	local programming									The Big Payoff	**Welcome Travelers**	The Kate Smith Hour		5:00 pm: Hawkins Falls 5:15 pm: The Gabby Hayes Show	Howdy Doody
DMN	?												**Ladies' Date** (since 10/13)	?		2:45 PM: **One Woman's Experience** (since 10/6)	?

== Winter 1952-1953 ==
	7:00 am	7:30 am	8:00 am	8:30 am	9:00 am	9:30 am	10:00 am	10:30 am	11:00 am	11:30 am	noon	12:30 pm	1:00 pm	1:30 pm	2:00 pm	2:30 pm	3:00 pm	3:30 pm	4:00 pm	4:30 pm	5:00 pm	5:30 pm
ABC	Local News & Programs
CBS	Local News & Programs					9:30 am Local News & 9:45 am CBS Morning News (to 10:30 am on F)	10:00 AM: Arthur Godfrey Time (to 11:30& am M-Th); 10:30 AM: Wheel of Fortune (to 11:00 AM); 11:00 AM: There's One In Every Family (to 11:15 AM on F); & 11:15 AM: The Bill Cullen Show (to 11:30 am on F)			Strike It Rich	Noon: Bride and Groom & 12:15 pm Love of Life	12:30 pm Search for Tomorrow & 12:45 pm The Guiding Light	Local News & Programs	The Garry Moore Show	2:00 pm Double or Nothing (M/W/F)/Local News & Programs (Tu/Th)	Art Linkletter's House Party	3:00 pm Mike & Buff	Local Programs	Action in the Afternoon	The U.N. In Action	Local News & Programs
NBC	The Today Show				Local Programs		Ding Dong School	Local News & Programs									The Big Payoff	Welcome Travelers	The Kate Smith Hour		5:00 pm Hawkins Falls & 5:15 pm The Gabby Hayes Show (M/W/F) & Local News & Programs (Tu/Th)	5:30 pm Howdy Doody
DMN	?												Ladies' Date	?		2:45 PM: One Woman's Experience	?

== Spring 1953 ==
	7:00 am	7:30 am	8:00 am	8:30 am	9:00 am	9:30 am	10:00 am	10:30 am	11:00 am	11:30 am	noon	12:30 pm	1:00 pm	1:30 pm	2:00 pm	2:30 pm	3:00 pm	3:30 pm	4:00 pm	4:30 pm	5:00 pm	5:30 pm
ABC	Local News & Programs
CBS	Local News & Programs					9:30 AM: Local News 9:45 AM: The Morning News	10:00 AM: Arthur Godfrey Time (M-W to 11:00 AM & Th to 11:30 AM), Wheel of Fortune (F to 11:00 AM); 11:00 AM There's One in Every Family M-W & F to 11:30 AM			Strike it Rich M-F / **Rod Brown of the Rocket Rangers** Sat	12 noon: Bride and Groom 12:15 PM: Love of Life	12:30 PM: Search for Tomorrow 12:45 PM The Guiding Light	Local News & Programs	The Garry Moore Show	2:00 PM Double or Nothing M, W & F & 2:15 PM: Freedom Rings Tu & Th	Art Linkletter's House Party	The Big Payoff	Local Programs	Action in the Afternoon	The U.N. in Action	Local News & Programs
NBC	The Today Show starring Dave Garroway				Local News & Programs		Ding Dong School	Local News & Programs									Break the Bank	Welcome Travelers	The Kate Smith Hour		5:00 PM: Hawkins Falls 5:15 PM: The Gabby Hayes Show	Howdy Doody
DMN	?												Ladies' Date	?		2:45 PM: One Woman's Experience (until April 3)	?

== Summer 1953 ==
	7:00 am	7:30 am	8:00 am	8:30 am	9:00 am	9:30 am	10:00 am	10:30 am	11:00 am	11:30 am	noon	12:30 pm	1:00 pm	1:30 pm	2:00 pm	2:30 pm	3:00 pm	3:30 pm	4:00 pm	4:30 pm	5:00 pm	5:30 pm
ABC	Local News & Programs
CBS	Local News & Programs					9:30 am: Local News; 9:45 am: The Morning News; 10:00 am: Arthur Godfrey Time (M-W to 11:00 am & Th to 11:30 am), Wheel of Fortune (F to 11:00 am), 10:30 am Local News; 11:00 am I'll Buy That M, W & F to 11:15 am & **The Bil Baird Show** Tu & Th at 11:30 am				Strike it Rich M-F / Rod Brown of the Rocket Rangers Sat	12 Noon Bride and Groom 12:15 PM Love of Life	12:30 pm Search for Tomorrow 12:45 pm The Guiding Light	Local News & Programs	The Garry Moore Show	2:00 pm Double or Nothing 2:15 pm Local News	Art Linkletter's House Party	The Big Payoff	Local Programs	Action in the Afternoon	**Summer School**	The U.N. in Action	Local News & Programs
NBC	The Today Show starring Dave Garroway				Local News & Programs		Ding Dong School	**Glamour Girl**	11:00 am Hawkins Falls & 11:15 am **The Bennetts**	11:30 am **Three Steps to Heaven** & 11:45 am **Follow Your Heart**	Local News & Programs						Break the Bank	Local News & Programs	**On Your Account**	**Ladies Choice**	5:00 pm **Atom Squad** & 5:15 pm **The Gabby Hayes Show**	Howdy Doody
DMN	?												Ladies' Date (until July 31)	?

== By network ==
=== ABC ===
**Not Returning From 1951-52**

- The Dennis James Show
- The Frances Langford-Don Ameche Show
- The Gayelord Hauser Show
- The Paul Dixon Show

=== CBS ===
**Returning Series**

- Action in the Afternoon
- Arthur Godfrey Time
- As the World Turns
- The Big Payoff
- The Bill Cullen Show
- The Bob Crosby Show
- Break the Bank
- Bride and Groom
- CBS News
- CBS Evening News
- The Edge of Night
- Face the Nation
- Freedom Rings
- The Garry Moore Show
- The Guiding Light
- Homemaker's Exchange
- Love of Life
- Mike and Buff
- Search for Tomorrow
- Strike It Rich
- Summer School
- The U.N. in Action
- Walter Cronkite with the News

**New Series**

- **Art Linkletter's House Party**
- **The Bil Baird Show**
- **Double or Nothing**
- **Rod Brown of the Rocket Rangers**
- **There's One in Every Family**
- **Wheel of Fortune**

**Not Returning From 1951-52**

- The Al Pearce Show
- Bert Parks Show
- The Egg and I
- The First Hundred Years
- Meet Your Cover Girl
- The Mel Torme Show
- Morning News
- The Steve Allen Show
- Your Surprise Store

=== NBC ===
**Returning Series**

- The Big Payoff
- The Bill Cullen Show
- Howdy Doody
- The Kate Smith Hour
- Meet the Press
- NBC News Update
- Strike It Rich (radio only)

**New Series**

- **Atom Squad**
- **The Bennetts**
- **Ding Dong School**
- **Follow Your Heart**
- **The Gabby Hayes Show**
- **Glamour Girl**
- **Ladies Choice**
- **Three Steps to Heaven**
- **The Today Show**
- **Welcome Travelers**

**Not Returning From 1951-52**

- The Bill Goodwin Show
- Breakfast Party
- The Bunch
- Dave & Charlie
- Here's Looking at You
- It's a Problem
- It's In the Bag
- The Johnny Dugan Show
- Kovacs on the Corner
- Matinee in New York
- The Ralph Edwards Show
- Richard Harkness News Review
- Ruth Lyons|Ruth Lyons 50 Club
- Vacation Wonderland
- Winner Take All

=== DuMont ===
New Series
- **Ladies' Date**
- **One Woman's Experience**

== See also ==
- 1952-53 United States network television schedule (prime-time)

== Sources ==
- https://web.archive.org/web/20071015122215/http://curtalliaume.com/abc_day.html
- https://web.archive.org/web/20071015122235/http://curtalliaume.com/cbs_day.html
- https://web.archive.org/web/20071012211242/http://curtalliaume.com/nbc_day.html
