= Children's television series =

Television programs designed for and marketed to children

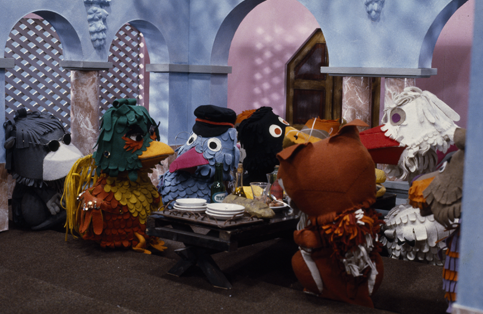
Characters from Fabeltjeskrant, perhaps the most well-known Dutch children's series

Children's television series or children's television shows are programs specifically designed for young audiences, combining entertainment, education, and social development. Since the early days of broadcasting, these shows have shaped childhood culture, influenced learning styles, and reflected changing social values. They are typically characterized by easy-going content devoid of sensitive or adult themes and are normally broadcast during the morning and afternoon when children are awake, immediately before and after school schedules generally start in the country where they air. Educational themes are also prevalent, as well as the transmission of cautionary tales and narratives that teach problem-solving methods in some fashion or another, such as social disputes.

The purpose of these shows, aside from profit, is mainly to entertain or educate children, with each series targeting a certain age of child: some are aimed at infants and toddlers, some are aimed at those aged 6 to 11 years old, and others are aimed at all children.

== History ==
Children's television is nearly as old as television itself. In the United Kingdom, the BBC's For the Children was first broadcast in 1946, and in English-speaking circles, is generally credited with being the first TV programme specifically for children.

Some authors posit television for children tended to originate from similar programs on radio. For example, the BBC's Children's Hour was launched as a radio broadcast in 1922, with BBC School Radio commencing live broadcasts in 1924.

In the USA in the early 1930s, radio adventure serials such as Little Orphan Annie became a staple of children's afternoon radio listening.

In Japan, early children's programming developed alongside the rise of anime in the 1960s, with shows such as Astro Boy helping establish animation as a dominant format for young audiences. Meanwhile, in Latin America, locally produced educational programs reflected regional culture and language.

=== Evolution of style in the United States and beyond ===
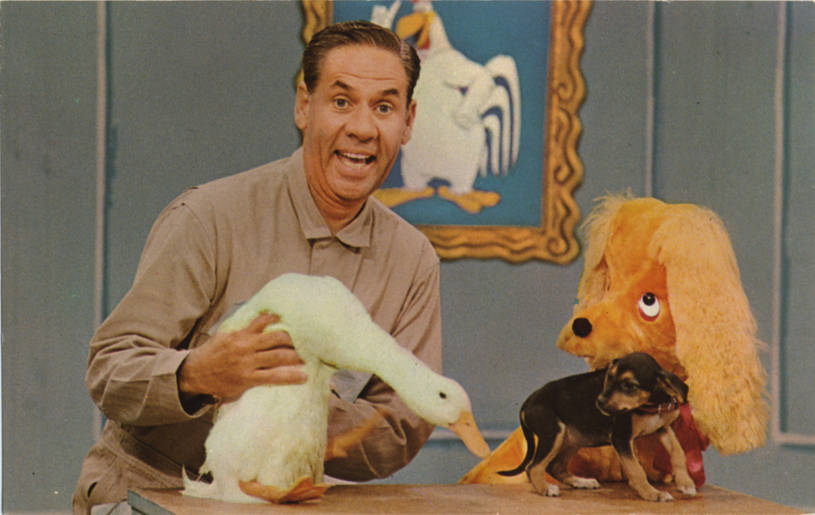
The Ray Rayner Show from Chicago children's television in 1968

Early children's shows included Kukla, Fran and Ollie (1947), Howdy Doody, and Captain Kangaroo. Another show, Ding Dong School, aired from 1952 to 1965. Its creator and host, Frances Horwich, would sit in front of the camera and simulate small talk with the viewing audience at home, demonstrating basic skills for the camera.

This practice lives on in contemporary children's broadcasting as a genre in of itself, with Australia's ongoing program Play School one example.

At one time, a program called Winky Dink and You took a more interactive approach, prompting its viewers to affix a clear vinyl sheet to their television and draw pictures to match what was going on on-screen. This format did not persist, nor was it replicated, due to a number of factors unrelated to its popularity: children whose parents did not buy them the vinyl sheet would draw with crayons directly on the television screen itself, potentially causing expensive damage; there were also concerns that having children within arm's length of a television screen of the era could expose them to harmful radiation.

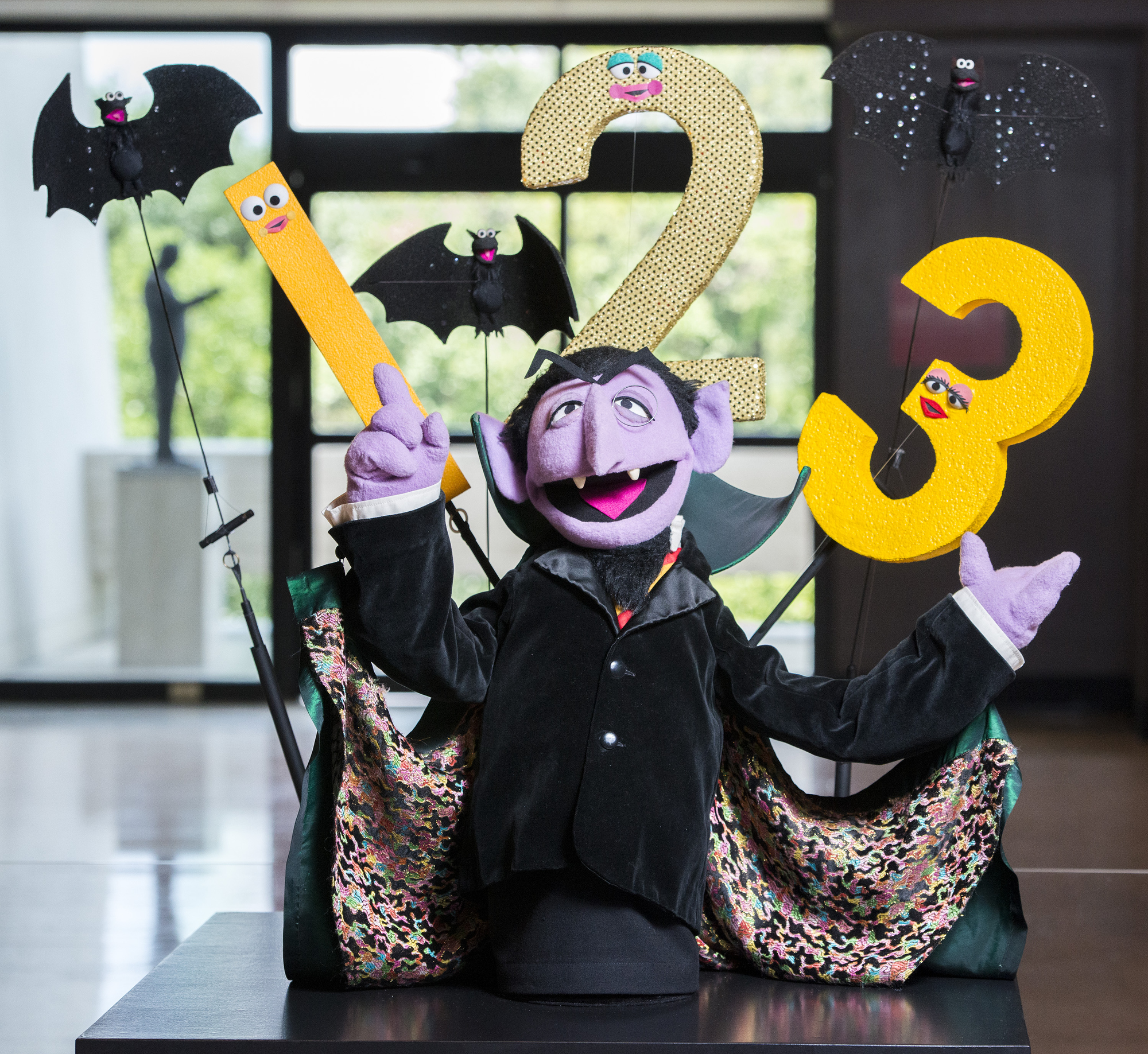
Count von Count from Sesame Street, a character created to help children to learn to count

Shows such as Sesame Street began to revolutionize children's television by combining research-based educational methods with entertainment. Its use of puppetry, music, and multicultural casting set a new standard for educational programming worldwide (The Electric Company and Mister Rogers' Neighborhood). In the 1990s, more children's television series such as Barney & Friends, Blue's Clues, Bear in the Big Blue House, and Wishbone were created.

A voluminous range of children's television programming now exists in the 2020s.

Notable successes outside the U.S. include shows like Play School, Noggin the Nog, Clangers, Bagpuss, Teletubbies, Danger Mouse, Count Duckula, Mr. Men and Thomas & Friends originating from the UK, The Adventures of Blinky Bill from Australia, The Busy World of Richard Scarry, The Big Comfy Couch and Paw Patrol from Canada, Le Manège Enchanté from France, Pingu from Switzerland, Moomin from Finland, Die Sendung mit der Maus from Germany, Alfred J. Kwak from the Netherlands, and Marine Boy and Okaasan to Issho from Japan.

Canadian studio Nelvana is a particularly prolific producer of children's programming. Much of Nelvana's product is broadcast worldwide, especially in the US, where the similarities in dialect do not require any dubbing or localization.

=== Role of advertising ===
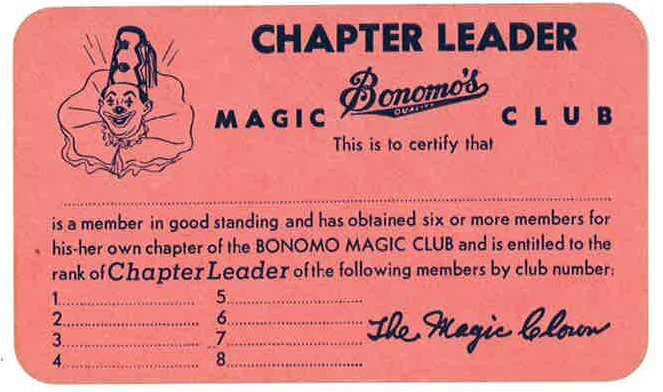
A fan club "membership card" for The Magic Clown, with the Bonomo candy brand logo

In the United States, early children's television was often co-opted as a platform to market products and it rarely contained any educational elements (for instance, The Magic Clown, a popular early children's program, was primarily an advertisement for Bonomo's Turkish taffy.) In the early years of television, advertising to children posed a dilemma as most children have no disposable income of their own. As such, children's television was not a particularly high priority for the networks.

This practice continued in a toned-down manner through the 1980s in the United States after the Federal Communications Commission prohibited tie-in advertising on broadcast television. These regulations did not apply to cable, which remains out of the reach of the FCC's content regulations.The rise of toy-based programs in the 1980s blurred the line between entertainment and advertising. Series such as He-Man and the Masters of the Universe were designed partly to promote action figures, leading critics to argue that children's programming had become a form of extended commercial marketing.

Due in part to the success of He-Man and the Masters of the Universe, the 1980s saw a dramatic rise in television programs featuring characters of whom toy characters were being sold to retail consumers in bricks and mortar stores, underscoring the value potential of manufacturing merchandise for fans of children's programs. This practice remains firmly embedded in the broadcast sector's business case broadly in the 2020s.

Commercial-free children television was first introduced with Sesame Street on PBS in November 1969. It was produced by what is now known as Sesame Workshop (formerly Children's Television Workshop, known as CTW). From early radio-inspired broadcasts to global streaming platforms, children's television has continuously evolved in format, content, and purpose. While educational goals and entertainment remain central, issues such as commercialization, representation, and digital access continue to shape the industry's future. As technology advances, children's television will likely remain a powerful influence on childhood development and culture worldwide.

=== Saturday morning cartoon blocks ===
In the United States, Saturday mornings were generally scheduled with cartoons from the 1960s to 1980s.

In 1992, teen comedies and a "Today" show weekend edition were first to displace the cartoon blocks on NBC. Starting in September 2002, the networks turned to affiliated cable cartoon channels or outside programmers for their blocks.

On September 27, 2014, the last traditional Saturday network morning cartoon block, Vortexx, ended and was replaced the following week by the syndicated One Magnificent Morning on The CW.

=== Demographics ===
Children's television series can target a wide variety of key demographics based on age and gender. Few television networks target infants and toddlers under two years of age as it would not be practical.

Preschool programming often emphasizes repetition, bright visuals, and direct audience interaction to match early childhood cognitive development. In contrast, programming for older children tends to include more complex narratives, humor, and character development. In a number of cases, such shows are produced in consultation with educators and child psychologists in an effort to teach age-appropriate lessons (the series Sesame Street pioneered this approach when it debuted in 1969). A format that has increased in popularity since the 1990s is the "pseudo-interactive" program, in which the action of the show stops and breaks the fourth wall to give a young viewer the opportunity to answer a question or dilemma put forth on the show, with the action continuing as if the viewer answered correctly, Attempts to reach this demographic with ad-supported programming largely ended in the late 1980s with the introduction of the people meter as the standard for audience measurement; most young children were too young and lacked the attention span to operate the device properly, causing major declines in ratings for shows that targeted them. Such programming has instead been carried mainly via non-commercial networks and by subscription-based cable networks.

Shows that target the demographic of persons 6 to 11 years old focus primarily on entertainment and can range from comedic cartoons to action series. Most children's television series targeting this age range are animated (with a few exceptions, perhaps the best-known being the Power Rangers franchise). Typically, programs are either 'for boys' or 'for girls'.

The teen demographic targets viewers 12 to 18 years of age. Live-action series that target this demographic are more dramatic and developed, including teen dramas and teen sitcoms. In some cases, they may contain more mature content that is usually not permissible on shows targeting younger viewers, and can include some profanity or suggestive dialogue.

Educational programming targeted at this demographic has historically been rare, other than on NASA TV's education block. However, some programming aimed at the demographic has had some tangential educational value in regard to social issues, such as the now-defunct TNBC block of sitcoms, which often tackled issues such as underage drinking or drug use.

=== Under-represented groups ===
According to at least one journalist, for years, Broadcast Standards and Practices departments of networks, Parental Guidelines, and campaigns by social conservatives limited "efforts to make kids animation more inclusive."

One former executive of Disney, David Levine, said that "a lot of conservative opinion" drove what was depicted on Cartoon Network, Disney Channel, and other alike channels. Some argued that cable television, which began to pick up in the 1990s, "opened the door for more representation" even though various levels of approvals remained.

Through the 2000s', advocacy group GLAAD repeatedly highlighted the lack of LGBT representation in children's programming in particular. Two years later, they recorded the highest number of LGBTQ characters they ever recorded up to that point.

In 2017, some said that LGBTQ+ characters in animated television were somewhat rare, despite the fact that GLAAD praised the number of characters in broadcast and primetime television.

From 2017 to 2019, Insider noted that there was a "more than 200% spike in queer and gender-minority characters in children's animated TV shows." In 2018 and 2019, GLAAD stated that Amazon, Hulu, and Netflix, had increased LGBTQ representation in "daytime kids and family television."

In their January 2021 report, GLAAD praised LGBTQ representation in episodes of DuckTales, The Owl House and Adventure Time: Distant Lands. Despite this, some industry practitioners state that more than 90% of LGBTQ characters in kid's animated shows within Insider's database of characters in children's animated television shows "require either a cable, satellite, streaming, or internet subscription to view them on first airing."

== Channels ==
=== United States ===
In the United States, there are two major commercial cable networks dedicated to children's television. Both also operate secondary services with specialized scopes drawing upon their respective libraries, such as a focus on specific demographics, or a focus upon classic programming that fall within their scope and demographics; both have also extensively franchised their brands outside the United States.

- Nickelodeon and Cartoon Network launched in 1979 and 1992, respectively, with the former being the first children's television channel; it consists largely of original series aimed at children, preteens and young teenagers, including animated series, to live-action comedy and action series, as well as series aimed at preschoolers (via the Nick Jr. brand) during school hours. It operates only during the daytime hours; Nick at Nite, a block of sitcom reruns, occupies the channel space in the overnight hours. It only operates during the daytime hours, with Adult Swim, a channel consisting of adult animation and alternative comedy content, occupying its channel space at night.
  - Nickelodeon and Cartoon Network operate four digital cable and satellite channels separate from the main service: Nick Jr. Channel, a channel devoted to preschool programming; Nicktoons and Boomerang, which primarily runs animated programming; NickMusic, a pop music video service branded as "MTV Hits" prior to 2016; and TeenNick, a channel devoted to live-action programming and sometimes animated. Boomerang also specializes in programs centered around classic brands that parent company Skydance owns (particularly Hanna-Barbera, MGM and Warner Bros. Animation), along with some imported programs, reruns of Cartoon Network original programs, and burn-off properties. Skydance also operates Discovery Family (along with its Spanish-language counterpart Discovery Familia), a joint venture with Hasbro that Skydance acquired a majority stake in along with its merger with Discovery Channel and carries animated programming in daytime along with family-oriented factual programming (including Discovery library programs) at nighttime; and MeTV Toons, a joint venture with Weigel Broadcasting that operates on the digital subchannels of Weigel-owned stations and other affiliates of its parent network MeTV and carries much of the same program library as Boomerang. This is in addition to a flexible number of free digital channels under the Skydance brand on parent company Skydance's over-the-top Subscription video on demand service Paramount+, Discovery+, HBO Max and Pluto TV includes much of the Skydance archives.
- Disney Channel, launched in 1983 as a premium channel; it consists of original first-run television series, theatrically released and original made-for-cable movies, and select other third-party programming. Disney Channel – which formerly operated as a pay-TV service – originally marketed its programs towards families during the 1980s, and moved toward a more explicitly children's audience by the late 1990s.
  - Disney Channel operates two digital channels separate from the main service: Disney Jr., which launched in 2011 and primarily broadcasts animated series catered towards a preschool audience, and Disney XD, which launched in 2009 which caters primarily to an older youth audience with an action-oriented focus. Disney does not have a traditional television outlet for its archival programming, which it has historically kept in a proverbial vault with limited access; much of its programming is available through Disney+, a subscription video on demand service. Disney also operates Freeform, a channel primarily carrying live-action programming catered towards a teenage/young adult audience. Although its previous incarnations under other owners had family-oriented formats and children's programming, they have since been phased out in favor of series such as teen dramas, some coming from Disney Channel.

Under current mandates, all broadcast television stations in the United States must show a minimum of three hours per week of educational children's programming, regardless of format. Until 2019, this rule also applied to digital subchannels; as a result, digital multicast networks whose formats should not fit children's programming, such as Live Well Network and TheCoolTV, were required to carry educational programs to fit the FCC mandates. (The rule for digital subchannels was repealed in July 2019; in practice, most still carry educational programs anyway.) In 2017, there was a programming block that aired on syndication called KidsClick; it was notable as a concerted effort to program children's shows on television without regard to their educational content, one of the first such efforts since the E/I rule took effect. The transition to digital television has allowed for the debut of whole subchannels that air children's programming 24/7; examples include PBS Kids and BabyFirst, along with multiple streaming providers.

=== Canada ===
In English, Corus Entertainment operates two original specialty channels (YTV and Treehouse) and localized versions of three brands (Cartoon Network, Boomerang, and Disney Channel).

In French, Corus operates Télétoon, TVA Group operates the preschool-oriented Yoopa, and Bell Media runs the teen-oriented Vrak. Via its majority-owned subsidiary Telelatino, Corus also operates two children and family-oriented networks in Spanish and Italian, TeleNiños and Telebimbi respectively.

On broadcast television and satellite to cable undertakings, children's television content is relegated to the country's public and designated provincial educational broadcasters, including CBC (CBC Television and Ici Radio-Canada Télé), City Saskatchewan, CTV Two Alberta (formerly Access), Knowledge Network, Télé-Québec, TFO, and TVOntario (TVOKids).

Aided by the cultural similarities between Canada and the US, along with film credits and subsidies available from the Canadian government, a large number of animated children's series have been made in Canada with the intention of exporting them to the United States. Such programs carry a prominent Government of Canada wordmark in their closing credits.

=== United Kingdom ===
The BBC operates children's oriented television networks on digital terrestrial television. They run CBBC as well as the preschool-oriented CBeebies. The channels were spun off from children's television strands on the BBC's respective flagship channels, BBC One and BBC Two. The BBC has largely phased out children's programming from their main channels to focus on the dedicated services. In 2012, as part of the "Delivering Quality First" initiative, the BBC announced that it would end the broadcast of CBBC programmes on BBC One following the completion of the transition to digital terrestrial television, citing low viewership in comparison to broadcasts of the programmes on the CBBC channel. Channel 5 also broadcasts a preschool-oriented block known as Milkshake!, while its owner, Paramount Networks International, also runs versions of Nickelodeon and its sister networks Nicktoons and Nick Jr.

British versions of Cartoon Network and its sister channels Boomerang and Cartoonito also operate in the country, some 25 years after the initial launch.

ITV broadcast their own strands of children's programmes since launch in 1955 until 27 August 2023. The dedicated CITV Channel, which launched in 2006, closed a few days later, with children's programming continuing on a breakfast-time block on ITV2 until 10 April 2026, which marked the end of children's programming on the linear ITV network; programmes for children continue to be available on the ITVX Kids streaming service.

=== Ireland ===
Ireland has one dedicated children's TV service, RTÉjr. Since 1998, RTÉ2 has provided children's programming from 07:00 to 17:30 each weekday, originally titled The Den, the service was renamed TRTÉ and RTÉjr in 2010. Irish-language service TG4 provide two strands of children's programming Cúla 4 Na nÓg and Cúla 4 during the day. Commercial broadcaster TV3 broadcast a children's strand called Gimme 3 from 1998 to 1999. And then broadcast a new strand called 3Kids.

=== Australia ===
Children's channels that exist in Australia are ABC Family, ABC Kids, Nickelodeon and its spin-off Nick Jr., and Cartoon Network and its spin-off Boomerang.

=== Japan ===
Children's channels that exist in Japan are NHK Educational TV, Kids Station, Disney Channel, Disney XD, Nickelodeon (also under a block on Animax, known as "Nick Time") and Cartoon Network (Cartoon Network's age demographic is moving towards older viewers with shows such as Hello Kitty, Regular Show and Adventure Time).

=== Finland ===
In Finland, MTV Oy operates the MTV Juniori channel targeting children. The channel is available on digital terrestrial networks, cable, broadband and satellite networks.

=== Iceland ===
One of the most well-known children's TV programmes comes from Iceland, LazyTown, was created by Magnus Scheving, European Gymnastics Champion and CEO of Lazytown Entertainment. The show has aired in over 180 countries, been dubbed into more than 32 languages and is the most expensive children's show of all time.

=== Romania ===
Nickelodeon was the first children's channel in Romania, launched in December 1998. Afterwards, Minimax became the first Romanian children's channel to air locally produced content, launched on Children's Day in 2001. Since then, channels like BabyTV and Disney Channel have arrived.

=== India ===
In 1995, Cartoon Network became the first children's channel to be launched in India. Subsequently, Disney Channel and Nickelodeon arrived. Hungama TV (2004) was the first children's channel that had local content. Pogo and BabyTV came later in 2006. By 2018, 23 channels have aired in India

=== Turkey ===
Children's channels that exist in Turkey are Cartoon Network, TRT Çocuk, MinikaÇOCUK, Minika GO and Zarok TV.

== See also ==
- List of local children's television series (United States)
- Saturday-morning cartoon for an in-depth history of children's television in the United States
- Advertising to children
- List of children's animated television series
- LGBTQ themes in Western animation
