= Wheel of Fortune (1952 game show) =

Former American game show

- Genre: Game show
- Created by: Peter Arnell
- Presented by: Todd Russell
- Narrated by: Hal Simms
- Country of origin: United States
- Original language: English

Production
- Running time: 22–24 minutes (daytime); 24–25 minutes (nighttime)
- Production company: Peter Arnell Productions

Original release
- Network: CBS
- Release: October 3, 1952 – December 25, 1953
- Release: July 7 – September 15, 1953

Wheel of Fortune is an American game show which ran from 1952 to 1953 on CBS in both daytime (October 3, 1952 – December 25, 1953) and nighttime (July 7 – September 15, 1953). It was presented by Todd Russell and narrated by Hal Sims.

Another American game show also titled Wheel of Fortune, that was produced by Merv Griffin and which debuted in 1975, had no connection to the original 1952 game show, although both followed a similar type of format, featuring cash and prizes that could be won by contestants, and both had the same respective logo visible in the center of the wheel.

== Gameplay ==
The series involved rewarding everyday people who had done good deeds in their life by having their stories told on national TV, then allowing them to spin a carnival-style prize wheel onstage and being awarded that prize. Occasionally, the lucky spin gave the good Samaritan a chance to win up to $1,000 by answering trivia questions.

== Theme ==
The show's theme was Kay Starr's version of the song "Wheel of Fortune", which was released in the first two months of 1952 and beginning on February 8 ran 22 weeks on Billboard's best-seller chart, with a nine-week stretch (March 14 to May 9) at #1.

Her version shared the charts with two other renditions during the same period (Bobby Wayne with Joe Reisman's orchestra; the second Eddie Wilcox & Sunny Gale), however the latter two were not as popular. The Wayne/Reisman version appeared from February 15 to April 18 (peaking at #13), while the Wilcox/Gale rendition appeared from February 1 to March 7 (peaking at #14). Pianist Milton Kaye also composed music for the show.

== Broadcast history ==
Wheel debuted on October 3, 1952, at 10:00 AM Eastern (9:00 Central), facing Breakfast Party on NBC and local programming on ABC. In an odd move, the show debuted on a Friday, where the series aired for a full hour until 11:00 AM (10:00 Central) each week; the second half-hour competed against local shows.

On November 24, Breakfast was replaced by the children's program Ding Dong School. On July 6, the Peacock debuted the Henry Babbitt-hosted game Glamour Girl at 10:30, which only competed with the hour-long game on Fridays.

The show's popularity spawned a nighttime version on July 7, 1953, at 8:30 PM, but quickly folded on September 15 against Break the Bank on NBC and local programs elsewhere.

The daytime version fared little better, having been worn down by Glamour and Ding Dong despite the former changing hosts on October 8 from Babbitt to Jack McCoy. Wheel bowed on November 6, 1953, with Glamour following suit on January 8, 1954; Ding Dong remained until the end of 1956.

== Australian version ==
Despite its short run in America, the show found success in Australia on radio and television from 1959–62. Originally hosted by series producer Reg Grundy, he was replaced by Walter Elliott in 1962.

A similar carnival-style wheel was used in the original 1973 Wheel pilot (Shopper's Bazaar), although that wheel was operated by a motor. A further (and far more explicit) connection arrived in 1981, when Grundy debuted his adaptation of Griffin's Wheel which (like its American counterpart) also had a very long and successful run on the Seven Network until 2006.

A short-lived remake and revival called Million Dollar Wheel of Fortune hosted by Tim Campbell and Kelly Landry ran on the Nine Network for a brief period in 2008. The Million Dollar Wedge concept has been carried over to the original American version since its 26th season debut in the same year.

== Episode status ==
The American series is believed to be destroyed as per network practices of the era. A photo of Russell and the wheel was used in the A&E Biography TV Game Shows.

The Australian version likely suffered the same fate, although clips of an episode were used in the 2006 special 50 Years: 50 Stars. An episode (missing the opening and closing titles) is held by National Film and Sound Archive as a kinescope recording. The survival rate of Australian game shows of the 1950s and 1960s is highly erratic: although around 13 episodes exist of the short-lived 1957 series Give it a Go, no recordings exist of the popular Melbourne version of Tell the Truth.
