= Fran Norris =

Children's television pioneer (1911–1988)

Fran Norris (1911 – 1988), or "Aunt Fran" was a children's television pioneer, best known for her TV program "Aunt Fran and Her Playmates" which aired from 1950 to 1957 over WBNS-TV in Columbus, Ohio.

Fran Norris began creating what would be one of the first children's programs beginning in 1949 in Plain City, Ohio after observing her four-year-old child imitate a television DJ show they were watching. She asked WBNS-TV to put her on the air so she could make a show geared directly to young children. She was not originally offered payment, however, her show quickly became such a hit that there was a waitlist for sponsors and children were booked up to a year in advance to be ‘playmates’ on the show. Norris' show is considered to be one of the first children's programs to combine education with entertainment and was among the first to create a show designed to develop the cognitive and social skills of young children. Her show was the precursor for others such as Ding Dong School and Sesame Street.

In 2002, a documentary film was made about Fran Norris and her show titled “Making Television History: Aunt Fran and Her Playmates”, that was co-produced and directed by University of Alabama at Birmingham (UAB) communication studies Assistant Professor June Mack, M.F.A.
