= Monodrama Theater =

- Created by: Lawrence Menkin
- Written by: Jay Bennett; Henrik Ibsen; Charles Dickens; William Shakespeare
- Directed by: Lawrence Menkin
- Starring: Carroll Baker; Jack Manning; Jan Sherwood; Anne Thomas; Stephen Elliott; Owen Jordan
- Country of origin: United States

Production
- Running time: 15 min./30 mins.

Original release
- Network: DuMont
- Release: May 1952 – December 7, 1953

Monodrama Theater, also known as Mono-Drama Theatre, is a late night television series which aired on the DuMont Television Network weekdays at 11pm ET from May 1952 to December 1953.

== Production background ==
The series consisted of a single actor or actress performing in front of a black curtain, or bare stage, with recorded music cues, in an example of monodrama. Some sources suggest this series, produced by Lawrence Menkin (1911-2000), also aired episodes of One Man's Experience and One Woman's Experience, both also produced by Menkin. Filming took place at a tiny studio at 515 Madison Avenue.

In 1953, in a series of episodes of Monodrama Theater, actor Jack Manning performed a one-man show of Hamlet. His performance took place over the course of two weeks in 15-minute-long segments. Jack Gould, a television critic for the New York Times, praised Manning's performance as Hamlet, calling him "inventive, versatile and, above all, natural." Gould also noted of Manning at the time that, "He knows his Shakespeare and truly catches the meaning of the lines."

In April 1954, DuMont filled the 11pm ET time slot with The Ernie Kovacs Show, which ran until April 7, 1955.

== Preservation status ==
As with most DuMont series, no episodes are known to exist.

== See also ==
- List of programs broadcast by the DuMont Television Network
- List of surviving DuMont Television Network broadcasts
- 1953-54 United States network television schedule
- List of late-night American network TV programs

== Bibliography ==
- David Weinstein, The Forgotten Network: DuMont and the Birth of American Television (Philadelphia: Temple University Press, 2004) ISBN 1-59213-245-6
- Alex McNeil, Total Television, Fourth edition (New York: Penguin Books, 1980) ISBN 0-14-024916-8
- Tim Brooks and Earle Marsh, The Complete Directory to Prime Time Network TV Shows, Third edition (New York: Ballantine Books, 1964) ISBN 0-345-31864-1
