= Silk Stockings =

1955 musical

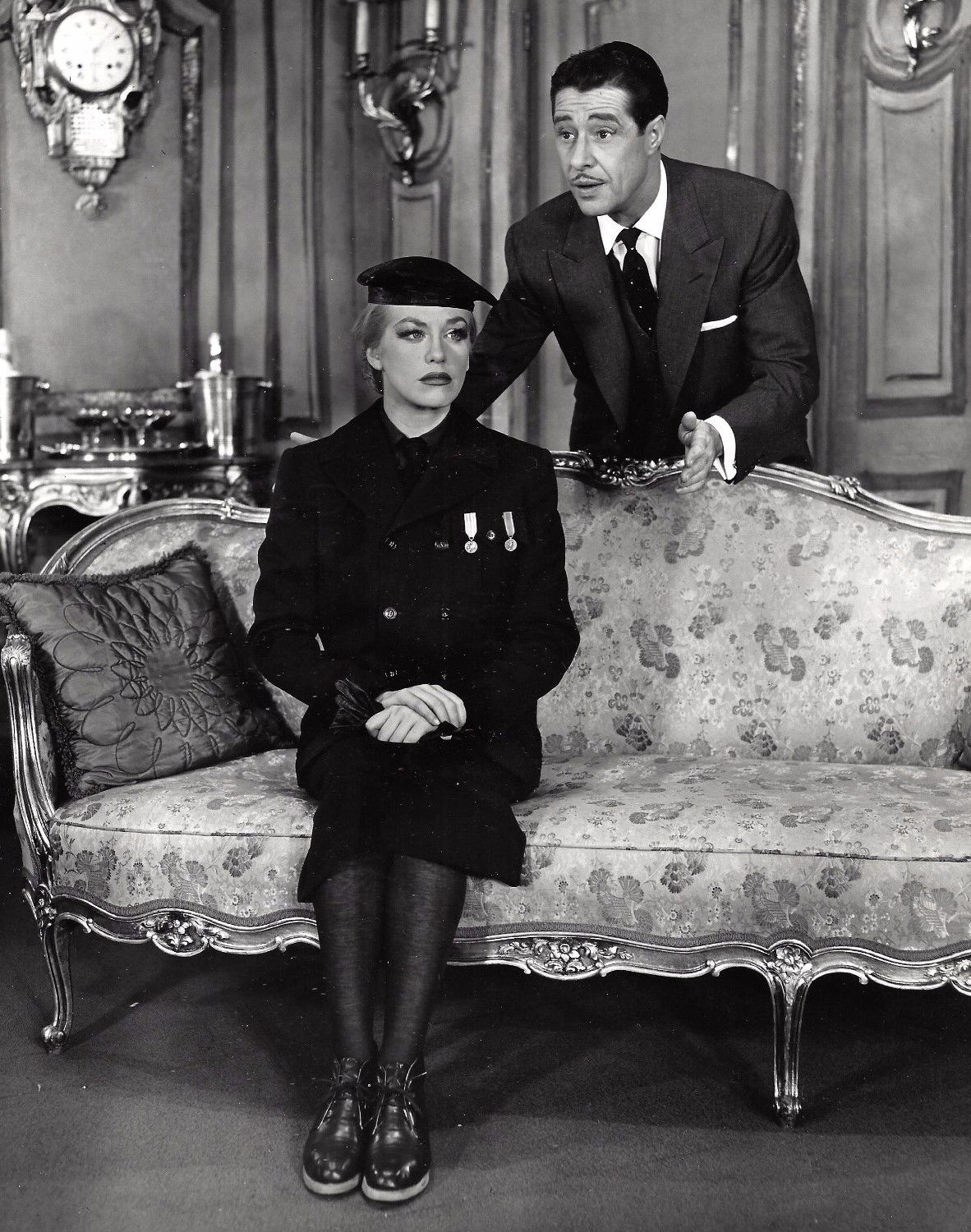
- Hildegard Knef and Don Ameche in the original Broadway production
- Music: Cole Porter
- Lyrics: Cole Porter
- Book: George S. Kaufman; Leueen MacGrath; Abe Burrows
- Basis: Melchior Lengyel's story Ninotchka; 1939 film Ninotchka
- Productions: 1955 Broadway

Silk Stockings is a musical with a book by George S. Kaufman, Leueen MacGrath, and Abe Burrows and music and lyrics by Cole Porter. The musical is loosely based on the Melchior Lengyel story Ninotchka and the 1939 film adaptation it inspired. It ran on Broadway in 1955. This was the last musical that Porter wrote for the stage.

== Production history ==
=== Background ===
During the "severely troubled tryout" George S. Kaufman and his wife Leueen MacGrath were replaced by Abe Burrows. (According to Cecil Michener Smith and Glenn Litton, Kaufman became angry and quit.) Burrows re-wrote most of the book. The producer Cy Feuer took over the direction from Kaufman. The three leads had not performed in a Broadway musical comedy: Hildegard Knef was a German film and stage actress, Don Ameche never had sung on stage, and Gretchen Wyler was making her Broadway debut. According to Glenn Litton, "All three triumphed."

=== Productions ===
Following tryouts in Philadelphia, Boston, and Detroit, the production opened on Broadway on February 24, 1955, at the Imperial Theatre and closed on April 14, 1956 after 478 performances. Directed by Cy Feuer and choreographed by Eugene Loring, the cast included Hildegard Knef (Ninotchka), Don Ameche (Steve Canfield), Gretchen Wyler (Janice Dayton), George Tobias, David Opatoshu, Julie Newmar, and Onna White. Jan Sherwood replaced Knef as Ninotchka and portrayed the role for the show's first national tour. Scenic and lighting designs were by Jo Mielziner and costumes were by Lucinda Ballard. The tour played the Curran Theatre in San Francisco, California starting in April 1956, as well as Los Angeles.

The score "played a large part in keeping Silk Stockings running on Broadway for 478 performances and in helping to recoup the immense production expenses for the show (brought in at a cost of $370,000, Silk Stockings was considered one of Broadway's most expensive musicals for its time)...The big hit...was clearly 'All of You'." An original cast recording was released by RCA Victor.

The Lost Musicals staged reading of the musical was held in September 2005 in New York City.

== Synopsis ==
Original cast recording

Special envoy Nina Yaschenko (Ninotchka) is dispatched from the Soviet Union to rescue three foolish commissars from the pleasures of Paris. Romanced by theatrical agent Steven Canfield, she eventually comes to recognize the virtues of capitalist indulgence. Meanwhile, Peter Boroff, Russia's greatest composer, is being wooed by Janice Dayton, America's swimming sweetheart, to write the score for her first non-aquatic picture, a musical adaptation of War and Peace.

== Characters and cast ==
- Ivanov – Henry Lascoe
- Brankov – Leon Belasco
- Bibinski – David Opatoshu
- Steve Canfield – Don Ameche
- Ninotchka – Hildegarde Neff
- Janice Dayton – Gretchen Wyler
- Peter Ilyitch Boroff – Philip Sterling
- Commissar Markovitch – George Tobias
- Pierre Bouchard – Marcel Hillaire
- Vera – Julie Newmar

== Song list ==
Act I

- "Too Bad" - Ivanov, Brankov, Bibinski, and Hotel Staff
- "Paris Loves Lovers" - Steve Canfield and Ninotchka
- "Stereophonic Sound" - Janice Dayton
- "It's a Chemical Reaction, That's All" - Ninotchka
- "All of You" - Steve
- "Satin and Silk" - Janice
- "Without Love" - Ninotchka
- "All of You" (Reprise) - Steve

Act II

- "Hail, Bibinski" - Ivanov, Brankov, Bibinski, and Ensemble
- "As On Through the Seasons We Sail" - Steve Canfield and Ninotchka
- "Josephine" - Janice
- "Siberia" - Ivanov, Brankov, Bibinski
- "Silk Stockings" - Steve Canfield
- "The Red Blues" - Ninotchka and Ensemble
- "Too Bad" (Reprise) - Full Company

== Film ==
The film Silk Stockings, based on the stage musical, was released in 1957.
