= Judith C. Waller =

American broadcasting pioneer (1889–1973)

Waller in 1946

Judith Cary Waller (February 19, 1889 – October 28, 1973) was an American broadcasting pioneer. Despite the fact that she knew nothing about radio at the time, she became the first station manager of Chicago radio station WMAQ when it went on the air in 1922. She was one of the first female radio station managers in the United States, along with Eleanor Poehler of WLAG/WCCO in Minneapolis, and Bertha Brainard of WJZ and Vaughn De Leath of WDT in New York City. During her tenure as station manager, Waller was responsible for obtaining broadcast rights for Chicago Cubs home games for WMAQ and for hiring Freeman Gosden and Charles Correll as Amos 'n' Andy after they left WGN radio over syndication rights. Waller tried to interest the CBS radio network in the program with no success. NBC brought the program to its Blue Network three years before its purchase of WMAQ in 1931.

Waller was also responsible for the long-running discussion program University of Chicago Round Table on radio. The program began at WMAQ; it was then heard on the NBC Radio Network for over twenty years. She was also active in various educational programs, having started a children's radio club centered around the educational programs broadcast by WMAQ; there were more than 275,000 children enrolled in the club with more than 100 area schools participating in the program. Waller also began a program at Northwestern University to provide professional training to college students interested in broadcasting as a profession.

She also entered into television work. Waller promoted the idea of a nursery school program for television; it began on WMAQ-TV as Ding Dong School in 1952. Within months, it was picked up by NBC's television network. Waller remained station manager until WMAQ was purchased by the National Broadcasting Company in 1931. She was then appointed director of education and public affairs for NBC's Midwest operations. In 1955, Waller was named as the public affairs representative for the NBC network, a post she held until her retirement from NBC in 1957. While Waller was no longer working at NBC, she did not stop her activities involving media and education. After leaving NBC, she was active in the Midwest Program on Airborne Television Instruction and other projects. Waller died in Evanston, Illinois, on October 28, 1973; she was known to many as "The First Lady of Radio."

== Early years and family ==
Judith Cary Waller was born on February 19, 1889, in Oak Park, Illinois. She was the eldest daughter of Doctor John Duke Waller and Katherine Short Waller. Following her 1908 graduation from Oak Park High School, a wealthy aunt gave her the gift of a year in Europe. Though she was expected to make a social debut after her return, Waller enrolled in business college. She was hired for secretarial work after completing her training. Waller settled into work at J. Walter Thompson in Chicago in a new division of the company called the "women's department", eventually spending two years in their New York offices. After her mother's health made her return to Chicago in 1920, Waller found employment at the local offices of the American Red Cross.

While on her trip through Europe, Waller met Walter A. Strong, who was the business manager of the Chicago Daily News. Hoping to work in journalism, she asked Strong for a job. Strong phoned her one evening saying that the Daily News had just bought a radio station; he offered Waller the job of managing it. When she admitted to Strong that she didn't know what a radio station was, his cheerful reply was, "Neither do I. But come on down and we'll find out." Waller was hired in February 1922. She is thought to be the first woman in the United States who was employed in this type of position.

== Station management ==
The radio station was WGU and it was jointly owned by the Daily News and a Chicago department store, The Fair. It was assigned a frequency of 833 kilocycles with a transmitter power of about 100 watts. The WGU studios were at The Fair store and the station's transmitter was atop the department store. Waller showed an aptitude for radio programming when she planned the station's inaugural broadcast. Since the other Chicago radio station, KYW, was known for playing jazz, she realized she needed to do something different at WGU to attract an audience.

Ed Wynn at WMAQ, October 2, 1922. He spoke the first words heard on the station.

Waller asked opera star Sophie Braslau if she would sing for the station's first broadcast. Braslau performed on WGU on April 13, 1922, but it is not known if anyone heard the broadcast. (Note: Waller referred to Friday the 13th as "my day" because the day of WGU/WMAQ's first broadcast was a Friday.) WGU shut down for technical problems the next day; it remained off the air until a new transmitter was obtained. It was back on the air on October 2, 1922, with a 500–watt transmitter and was now operating on 750 kilocycles. New call letters were also applied for and the station was now known as WMAQ. (Note: To avoid confusion with the City of Chicago's radio station, WBU.)

Waller quickly learned if something needed to be done, it was her job to do it. Looking back on her entry into radio, she remarked with humor, "It was a one-man station and that one man was me." Waller was the one who created rules and policy, who found people to appear on the air, and did the necessary announcing. Because early radio stations had very small budgets and no commercials to create revenue, having guests or performers meant asking them to work without pay.

Even though the station was on the air only one or two hours a day at the time, it was sometimes a challenge to find enough material to fill them. Waller was fortunate enough to get Ed Wynn along with many musicians and vocalists to appear on the station's first broadcast as WMAQ, but there were times when she played the station's drums or the song bells to fill the time. When she was not on the air, Waller's time was filled with answering the station's mail and rushing back and forth between the Daily News to write scripts and the WMAQ studio to air what she had just written.

=== Ideas turn into programs ===
Waller (at right) and her secretary at WMAQ circa 1942

After actors and musicians realized the value of radio broadcasts as publicity, Waller's job of filling broadcast time became easier; at times these performers were not available. She began to think about how to both diversify and fill WMAQ's air time. Waller was able to use the station's connection to the Daily News to enlarge the type of programs WMAQ offered; the newspaper's book editor did regular book reviews and the women's editor helped with suggestions for programs which would be of interest to women.

Before WMAQ was a year old, Waller had impressed the Daily News with her ability to make the station work. The station had aired a music appreciation series and hosted a lecture series in cooperation with the University of Chicago; WMAQ had also begun remote broadcasting from the Chicago Theatre. The Daily News bought The Fair's interest in the radio station, then moved the station and its transmitter to Chicago's La Salle Hotel and was able to have WMAQ's frequency changed to 670 kilocycles. A look at the station's broadcast schedule for October 23, 1923, shows that WMAQ's on-air time had more than doubled; British statesman David Lloyd George was visiting Chicago and the station intended to air two speeches of his that evening.

By 1924, WMAQ was broadcasting a wide variety of programs; Georgene Faulkner, the "Story Lady," told stories for children, the station had assembled its own acting company for "Play Night" and performed plays on the air. It aired lectures from Northwestern University and the University of Chicago. WMAQ also began airing University of Chicago football games from Stagg Field. Waller became even more ambitious about expanding WMAQ's sports coverage in 1924. After hearing a friend's son's disappointment that his illness kept him from attending Chicago Cubs baseball games, Waller approached the team's owner, William Wrigley, about airing home games at Wrigley Field on WMAQ. Waller later said she was not sure if the idea of the radio medium for the games appealed to him or whether he was amused at a woman asking him about this, but Wrigley consented to have all home games broadcast on WMAQ.

=== Continued growth ===
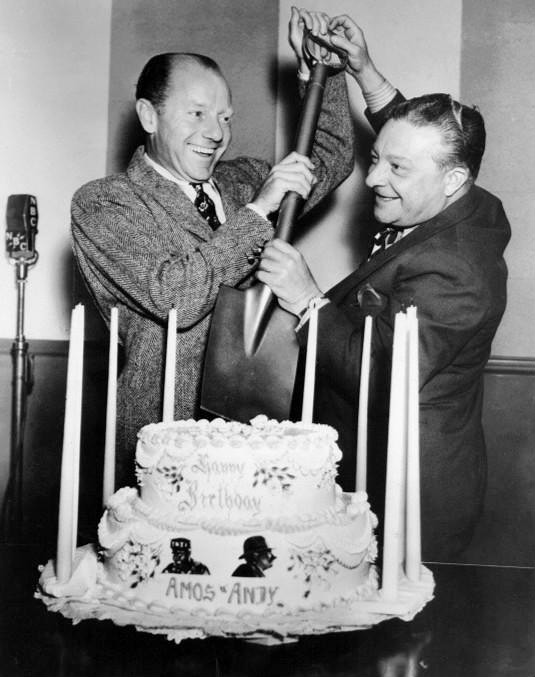
Gosden and Correll celebrate Amos 'n' Andy's 10th anniversary on the air, 1938

WMAQ continued to grow. After moving to the 670 kilocycles frequency, the station shared it with station WQJ until 1927 when the Daily News was able to lease the other station. (Note: The station was jointly owned by the Rainbo Gardens ballroom and the Calumet Baking Powder Company,) The station also gained its first commercial advertiser in the same year. By 1928, the station was on the air for 20 hours each day and had a staff of 50 people. In early 1928, Waller was contacted by a pair of actors who were looking for another station to broadcast their radio program. Freeman Gosden and Charles Correll were on WGN radio with a popular local program called "Sam 'n' Henry." Gosden and Correll did not renew their contract with WGN because the station was unwilling to grant them syndication rights for their program.

The asking price for Gosden and Correll and their announcer, Bill Hay, was $25,000 per year, along with their right to syndicate their radio show. Since this was more than WMAQ's annual operating budget, Waller had to consult with Walter Strong at the Daily News. Gosden and Correll performed their act in episode form, similar to a serial film; the exception was that the episodes were heard daily instead of weekly. She felt that the expense for their services was justified and would mean profits for WMAQ in the long run when the program was syndicated. Strong was in agreement; the contracts were signed and Gosden and Correll re-worked some of their act. Since WGN owned the title Sam 'n' Henry, the new radio program was called Amos 'n' Andy and it aired on WMAQ for the first time in March 1928.

The program was a great success both locally and in markets where it was syndicated. Still, Waller felt it should be aired nationally on a network. Since WMAQ was a Columbia Broadcasting System affiliate at the time, she traveled to New York to try to interest the network in broadcasting the show. Years later, Waller recalled that she was told the network already had the Two Black Crows. When she tried to explain that Amos 'n' Andy was not musical but a story told in segments, she was asked if she thought such an act could be heard on the network every weekday. After Waller answered "yes", she was then told to go back to Chicago because she knew nothing about radio. After it had been put into syndication, NBC began monitoring developments regarding the program. The program was signed and made its debut on the Blue Network on August 19, 1929; NBC paid a record $100,000 for the first year of broadcast rights.

Waller also aired the radio anthology Destination Freedom, with scripts written by Richard Durham. That series ran from 1948 to 1950 and was dedicated to retelling the lives of Negros in the United States and Western Hemisphere. From 1950 to 1951 the series was relaunched as an anthology with a Paul Revere narrator using historical events to discuss general concepts of law and democracy.

== New ownership and responsibilities ==
The Daily News had now outgrown its present quarters. The newspaper began construction of a building which would house the newspaper offices and printing plant as well as the WMAQ studios and offices. When it was completed in 1929; WMAQ shifted its transmitter to a site west of Chicago's Loop in Elmhurst, Illinois, and moved to the Daily News Building. (Note: The operating power was also increased to 5,000 watts when the transmitter was moved to Elmhurst.) In 1930, Frank Knox purchased a controlling interest in the Daily News. Knox was only interested in the newspaper, so he set out to divest the company of the radio station. Knox searched for a ready buyer for half of the shares in WMAQ, finding one in NBC. (Note: Knox made his first offer to Columbia Broadcasting Company, but terms were not reached. The terms of the NBC acquisition were for the sale of 50% of WMAQ's stock initially, followed by an offer of the other 50% in 1934.) The purchase meant NBC would now be operating the station.

NBC intended to make Chicago a major hub for its radio networks. In 1930, the network leased more than 66,000 square feet of space in the newly completed Merchandise Mart with plans to move 50 radio programs which were presently originating in New York to their new Chicago headquarters. In 1931, NBC was able to purchase Chicago radio station WENR from financially troubled Samuel Insull. Later in the year, it bought WMAQ from the Daily News. With the purchase of WMAQ, the network now owned a radio station in Chicago for their Blue Network (WENR) and their Red Network (WMAQ). While WMAQ was moved to NBC's new Merchandise Mart base of operations a few months after it was purchased, WENR remained at Chicago's Civic Opera House, where it was based when owned by Insull.

During the time the Daily News owned the station, Waller had risen to become the vice-president and manager of WMAQ with William S. Hedges as president of the company. Under NBC's management, she was offered the job of director of Public Service and educational programming for NBC's Midwest division; Hedges was named president and general manager of the NBC-run station. (Note: Because she had earlier been involved with United Independent Broadcasters, which later became CBS, Waller offered NBC her resignation. NBC refused to accept the offer.) While Waller was interested in these types of programs, she later said her interests were much broader than that because as the station manager, she had to be interested in all types of radio programs.

=== New challenges and success ===
Waller's past work with educational radio programs may have been responsible for the appointment to her new NBC position. During her early tenure at WMAQ, she was able to bring radio to schools as an assistant to the educator, not as a replacement for the teacher. Waller began a radio club for children centered around educational programs broadcast by WMAQ for use in the classroom. The club had more than 275,000 members and was the largest club of its kind in the US. WMAQ aired the program three times a week as part of its daytime broadcast schedule. More than 100 local schools were using the programs in their classrooms by 1928.

"Round Table" on the air from the University of Chicago, 1941. "Keep Your Elbows On The Table" was to keep speakers within range of the microphone in the table's center

The University of Chicago and WMAQ radio had an extensive working relationship; both agreed to try something new in the way of public affairs programming. On February 4, 1931, three professors from the university began a spontaneous on-air discussion of current affairs. The conversation that followed was much like those regularly heard in the university's faculty dining room. There was enough listener interest in this type of discussion to warrant a weekly program. Since the tables in the faculty dining room were round, the participants referred to their talks as "round table discussions". The program took its name from this, becoming the University of Chicago Round Table. It continued as a local program after NBC's purchase of WMAQ.

Two years after its inception, Waller successfully convinced the NBC network to air the discussion show as a sustaining program. By 1937, it was carried by 37 network affiliates and reached between 750,000 and one million listeners every Sunday. From the program's first broadcast, the university indicated it would not censor any of the show's participants. The broadcasters' viewpoint was that they could not afford to air any content which would be offensive to listeners. Since the university was dependent on commercial radio stations to air the programs it produced, it was necessary to accommodate the broadcasters by notification of a show's topic in advance and to provide them with notes giving a rough sketch of what was to be said on their airwaves.

Two different views on educational programming existed on the network level. The network program director appeared to have a very broad definition of what was educational or cultural while a network vice-president held a more traditional interpretation. (Note: The network program director thought of Amos 'n' Andy as educational. Because it was sponsored by a toothpaste company, his opinion was that the radio show taught many people how to use a toothbrush.) The network retained the right to refuse a discussion and at times, felt it necessary to do so. A discussion about African-American rights was vetoed by the network's program director, who suggested that it might be wise to remove the discussion program from the network schedule. Despite these disagreements, the program continued on the air and won three Peabody Awards; it aired on the NBC network for over 20 years.

=== Travel and television ===
Waller was appointed to produce all network programming for the 1933 Century of Progress, but much of her work was done away from Chicago. She represented the network by participating in various seminars on education, attending conventions and through her many speaking engagements; Waller spent about six months a year traveling the US. She established a professional training program for young people interested in entering the broadcast industry through a joint effort with Northwestern University beginning in 1942. The NBC-Northwestern University Summer Radio Institute readied students for careers in radio and television. During this time, Waller also wrote two books about broadcasting: Broadcasting in the public service (1943) and Radio: The Fifth Estate (1946).

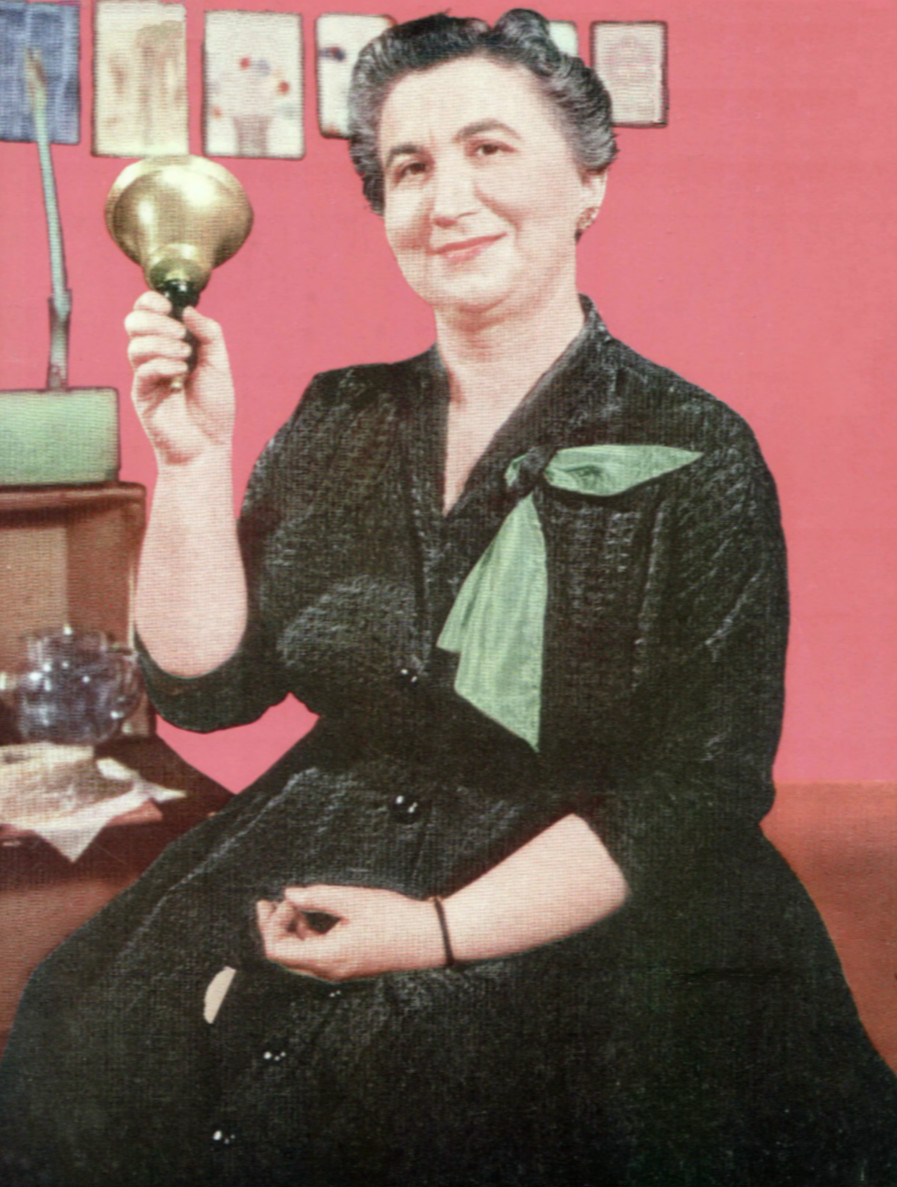
Frances Horwich as Ding Dong School's "Miss Frances"

Waller became involved in children's television by way of a conversation with WNBQ's program director, who mentioned that there were 235,000 preschool children in the Chicago area. He then asked Waller what she intended to do about it. Plans were developed to produce a nursery school type program where there would be a teacher on television with her students at home in front of their television sets. The show was designed from the eye-level of a small child, so cameras and props were adjusted accordingly. Props were kept simple so they were easily identifiable by young children. After the basics of the show were settled on, the next step was to find the right person to host the program. Waller and her team prepared a list of possible candidates; each was contacted and invited to audition for the show. Dr. Frances Horwich, head of Roosevelt University's education department, was one of the educators who was contacted. Horwich only had experience with television as part of some panel and discussion programs, but was an experienced nursery school teacher. The thought of being the only person on camera frightened her somewhat, but she won the audition and agreed to become the host of the program. When hearing about the school bell which would open the program, a three-year-old staff member's son gave the show its name, Ding Dong School.

The program went on the air on October 2, 1952; it was not scheduled and was initially slated to air only once, depending on viewers' reactions. NBC officials were dubious about the show, so there was no advance promotion for it. One executive called it either the worst television program he had ever seen or a "roaring hit"; another's dire prediction was that the program would kill television and bring back radio. Neither was prepared for the 150 calls to the station praising the program immediately after it had ended or the flood of positive viewer mail which followed. Ding Dong School was quickly scheduled for weekday mornings at WNBQ. The program won a 1952 Peabody Award. The show began to be carried by the NBC television network in March 1953, where it was seen by 2,400,000 daily viewers. Within two months, it was beating Arthur Godfrey's morning television show in ratings and was receiving 500 letters from both parents and children daily. (Note: Godfrey was upset by the news, saying, "A kid show can do this to me?")

== Later years ==
In 1955, Waller was appointed public affairs representative for the NBC network. The position meant traveling throughout the U.S. and serving as a link between national organizations, and the NBC network. She announced her retirement from NBC in 1957. While she was no longer working for NBC, she remained active in projects relating to educational broadcasting. Waller remained active in the Northwestern University Summer Institute she had helped to start in 1942 and assisted in expanding the program to other colleges. She also became involved in the Purdue University program, Midwest Program on Airborne Television Instruction. Waller, who had received many honors and honorary college degrees for her work in the field of communications, was known as "The First Lady of Radio" by many. She died in Evanston, Illinois, on October 28, 1973.

== Books by Judith Waller ==
- Waller, Judith C. (1943). Broadcasting in the public service. John S. Swift. OCLC 12733047.
- Waller, Judith C. (1946). Radio: The Fifth Estate. Houghton Mifflin Company.

== Sources cited ==
- Cox, Jim (2009). American Radio Networks: A History. McFarland. ISBN 978-0-7864-5424-2.
- Edmiston, Fred W. (2009). The Coon-Sanders Nighthawks: "The Band That Made Radio Famous". McFarland. ISBN 978-1-4766-1229-4.
- Hamilton, John Maxwell (2011). Journalism's Roving Eye: A History of American Foreign Reporting. LSU Press. ISBN 978-0-8071-4486-2.
- Godfrey, Donald G. (2006). Methods of Historical Analysis in Electronic Media. Routledge. ISBN 978-1-1356-0741-8.
- Godfried, Nathan (1997). WCFL, Chicago's Voice of Labor, 1926–78. University of Illinois Press. ISBN 978-0-2520-6592-7.
- Hilmes, Michele (1997). Radio Voices: American Broadcasting, 1922––1952. University of Minnesota Press. p. 139. ISBN 978-0-8166-2621-2.
- Halper, Donna (2015). Invisible Stars: A Social History of Women in American Broadcasting. Routledge. ISBN 978-1-3175-2018-4.
- Keith, Michael C. (2008). Radio Cultures: The Sound Medium in American Life. Peter Lang. ISBN 978-0-8204-8648-2.
- McLeod, Elizabeth (2013). The Original Amos 'n' Andy: Freeman Gosden, Charles Correll and the 1928–1943 Radio Serial. McFarland. ISBN 978-1-4766-0971-3.
- O'Dell, Cary (1997). Women Pioneers in Television: Biographies of Fifteen Industry Leaders. McFarland. ISBN 978-0-7864-0167-3.
- Signorielli, Nancy (1996). Women in Communication: A Biographical Sourcebook. Greenwood Publishing Group. ISBN 978-0-3132-9164-7.
- Ohles, Frederik; Ohles, Shirley M.; Ramsay, John G. (1997). Biographical Dictionary of Modern American Educators. Greenwood Publishing Group. p. 168. ISBN 978-0-3132-9133-3.
- Slotten, Hugh Richard (2009). Radio's Hidden Voice: The Origins of Public Broadcasting in the United States. University of Chicago Press. ISBN 978-0-2520-3447-3.
- Sterling, Christopher H. (2013). Biographical Encyclopedia of American Radio. Routledge. ISBN 978-1-1369-9375-6.
