= One Woman's Experience =

American TV anthology series (1952–1953)

- Also known as: One Woman's Story
- Genre: Anthology
- Created by: Lawrence Menkin
- Starring: Wendy Waldron
- Country of origin: United States
- Original language: English
- No. of seasons: 1

Production
- Running time: 15 minutes

Original release
- Network: DuMont
- Release: October 6, 1952 – April 3, 1953

One Woman's Experience, also known as One Woman's Story, is a DuMont Television Network anthology TV show created and produced by Lawrence Menkin (1911-2000) and starring Wendy Waldron. It dramatized, in serial form, literary classics about women.

The show aired from October 6, 1952 to April 3, 1953, Mondays through Fridays from 2:45pm to 3pm ET. The 15-minute show aired alongside another 15-minute Menkin show One Man's Experience which aired at 2:30pm ET. Some sources suggest that these episodes were also aired during the DuMont series Monodrama Theater which aired at 11pm ET from May 1952 until December 7, 1953.

== Episode status ==
As with many DuMont series, no episodes are known to exist.

== See also ==
- List of programs broadcast by the DuMont Television Network
- List of surviving DuMont Television Network broadcasts
- 1952–53 United States network television schedule (weekday)

== Bibliography ==
- David Weinstein, The Forgotten Network: DuMont and the Birth of American Television (Philadelphia: Temple University Press, 2004) ISBN 1-59213-245-6
- Alex McNeil, Total Television, Fourth edition (New York: Penguin Books, 1980) ISBN 0-14-024916-8
- Tim Brooks and Earle Marsh, The Complete Directory to Prime Time Network TV Shows, Third edition (New York: Ballantine Books, 1964) ISBN 0-345-31864-1
