= One Man's Experience =

American TV anthology series (1952–1953)

- Also known as: One Man's Story
- Genre: Anthology
- Created by: Lawrence Menkin
- Country of origin: United States
- Original language: English
- No. of seasons: 1

Production
- Running time: 15 minutes

Original release
- Network: DuMont
- Release: October 6, 1952 – April 10, 1953

One Man's Experience, also known as One Man's Story, is a DuMont Television Network anthology TV show written and produced by Lawrence Menkin (1911-2000). The show aired Monday through Friday at 2:30pm ET from October 6, 1952, to April 10, 1953. The 15-minute show aired back-to-back with another 15-minute show, One Woman's Experience which aired at 2:45pm ET.

Some sources suggest that these episodes were also aired during the DuMont series Monodrama Theater which aired at 11pm ET from May 1952 until December 7, 1953.

The series adapted literary classics about men's struggles into serial form. The title changed from One Man's Experience to One Man's Story in early 1953.

== Episode status ==
As with many DuMont series, no episodes are known to exist.

== See also ==
- List of programs broadcast by the DuMont Television Network
- List of surviving DuMont Television Network broadcasts

== Bibliography ==
- David Weinstein, The Forgotten Network: DuMont and the Birth of American Television (Philadelphia: Temple University Press, 2004) ISBN 1-59213-245-6
- Alex McNeil, Total Television, Fourth edition (New York: Penguin Books, 1980) ISBN 0-14-024916-8
- Tim Brooks and Earle Marsh, The Complete Directory to Prime Time Network TV Shows, Third edition (New York: Ballantine Books, 1964) ISBN 0-345-31864-1
