= Fan club =

Organized group of fans

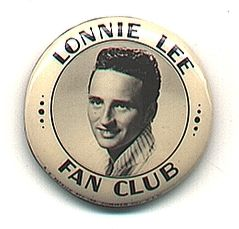
A 1959 button badge for members of the Lonnie Lee fan club

A fan club is an organized group of fans, generally of a celebrity. Most fan clubs are run by fans who devote considerable time and resources to support them. There are also "official" fan clubs that are run by someone associated with the person or organization the club is centered on. This is the case for many musicians, sports teams, etc.

Barbz, who support Nicki Minaj, Hollanders, who support Tom Holland, Carats, who support Seventeen, and Swifties who support Taylor Swift are examples of fan clubs.

== Etymology ==
The origin of the term fan in reference to a dedicated zealot is unclear. The word may have emerged in the 1800s, when boxing supporters were said to take a "fancy" to pugilistic sports. Among modern sports fans, however, the title is considered a shortened version of the word fanatic, as in "boxing fanatic", an indication of the dedication of fan club members.

== Functions ==
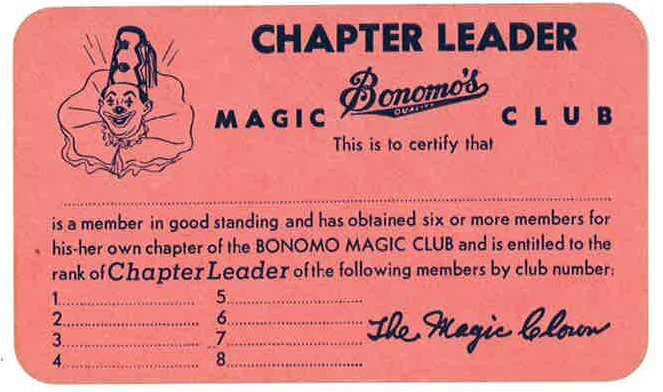
Fan club membership card for The Magic Clown children's television series, sponsored by Bonomo

Larger fan clubs may organize events and fundraising relating to what they are based on. In some cases, the money that is raised goes directly to fan club members or to fund the club itself.

There are two main kinds of fan clubs, there are fan clubs that do not require an official registration process and others that do. Fan clubs that do require a formal registration usually require a membership fee. Different fan clubs have different systems, however most clubs have an annual membership fee. These fees will be used to run the foundation. If the fan clubs are for certain fashion brands, they may use those fees for advertisement.

The term groupie is slang commonly used in reference to fans of a particular musician, band, or celebrity who follow the group- or individual- while they are touring, or who attend as many of their public appearances as possible. The word is often used to describe female fans seeking sexual relationships with musicians. They often value musicians themselves over their music.

Groupies are more personally affiliated with the band or celebrity they follow, however fans are not affiliated as they are more reserved than groupies would be. Most fan clubs are online and fans who are a part of these clubs, do not usually get to have personal connections with whom they are fans of.

== Internet ==
Today, many fan clubs have websites to support their efforts. Technology allows individuals in fan clubs to communicate across the world. These sites usually have photos and information on the object of their affection. For example, a fan site dedicated to musicians might have photos, videos, discussion boards, and information on upcoming concerts.
