= Action in the Afternoon =

American TV Western (1953–1954)

- Genre: Western; Drama
- Created by: Charles Vanda
- Written by: Leslie Urbach; William R. Cox; Dean Owens; John Fleming; Don Prindle; Clair Roskam; Richard Strome
- Directed by: Bill Bode; John Ullrich
- Starring: Jack Valentine; Barry Cassell; Jean Corbett; Harriss Forrest; Blake Ritter; Mary Elaine Watts; Sam Kressen; Chris Keegan; Creighton Stewart; Marvin Stephens; Norman Garfield; Jay Feierman; Walt Barnes; John Zacherle; David Soren
- Narrated by: Blake Ritter
- Opening theme: Aaron Copland, Billy the Kid (Ballet Suite)
- Country of origin: United States
- Original language: English
- No. of seasons: 1

Production
- Executive producers: Hubbell Robinson; Harry Omerle
- Producer: Don Lenox
- Production location: Philadelphia
- Cinematography: Dan Falzani; Ed Harper
- Camera setup: Multi-camera
- Running time: 30 minutes

Original release
- Network: CBS
- Release: February 2, 1953 – January 29, 1954

Action in the Afternoon is an American Western television series that aired live on CBS from February 2, 1953, to January 29, 1954. The series originated from the studios and back lot of WCAU, Channel 10 in Philadelphia, and was broadcast Monday through Friday regardless of the weather. The half-hour series aired variously at 3:30 pm or 4:00 pm, throughout its run.

The show starred singing cowboy Jack Valentine, who was backed up by the Tommy Ferguson Trio. Other characters included Jack's sidekick Ozzie, Sheriff Ace Bancroft, and Kate, who published the Huberle Record. Red Cotton ran the local saloon, the Copper Cup. The show could be very violent; the premiere left one character dead and one wounded.

== Production ==
While ad-libbing his pitch for the series to the executives at CBS, vice-president Charles Vanda set the story in the fictional town of Huberle, Montana, a name derived from CBS executives Hubbell Robinson and Harry Omerle.

Action in the Afternoon is the only live daily Western to appear on network television in the United States. Other live Westerns existed, however Action in the Afternoon was the only one that did not include prerecorded film segments in the program. If things moved along too fast, or actors needed time to move between the indoor and outdoor sets, the time would be filled by Jack Valentine singing with the Tommy Ferguson Trio playing along.

The outdoor sets included a general store, a bank, a blacksmith shop, the Copper Cup saloon, and six stagecoaches.

Because the program was live and outdoors, music director Richard Lester (later to direct two Beatles movies) made every effort to hide the sounds of the world beyond the back lot. The sounds of airplanes overhead and trucks backfiring as they drove past the studio were covered with appropriate music. However, during one particular broadcast a very loud unscripted sound was heard, and was soon discovered to be a horse biting one of the many microphones hidden around the outdoor set.

John Zacherle, who appeared on the show, described it in an interview: "It was a half-hour every afternoon, five days a week. It was really very exciting. The show was set in, I seem to recall, Hubberly, Montana, [sic] in the 1880s. They built a lot of outdoor scenery, just false-front buildings, so you could ride in on a horse, and it looked like a town. They'd ride horses outside the studio, and then if there was a shootout, they'd scramble to get inside the studio. There was a barroom, a doctor's office. They had a horseshoe man, a newspaper man, a lady who ran the bar. They were the regulars. But every week, some stranger would come to town -- mostly nasty people who were trying to steal something. By Friday, the stranger would either end up in jail or chased out of town... or married. Ha ha! Then on Monday, another stranger would come into town, and they'd start all over again."

== Reception ==
Three weeks into the broadcast, Time wrote that the "dialogue limps even more obviously than the camera" and that the series is "an experiment that needs a lot more work."
