= Jan Sherwood =

American actress

Jan Sherwood (born c.1923) is an American actress mostly known for her work on the stage. She made her Broadway debut in 1944 as Marpha in The Day Will Come. In 1950 she returned to Broadway to portray the Lady in Waiting to Katharine Hepburn's Rosalind in William Shakespeare's As You Like It.

In 1952 she portrayed Sarah Woodling in the original production of Paint Your Wagon and she originated the role of Venus in the 1954 musical Ondine. In 1953, she appeared in the short-lived DuMont Television Network series Monodrama Theater.

In 1956 she took over the role of Ninotchka in Silk Stockings and then toured the United States in that role for that show's first national tour.

Sherwood was born Jeanne Marie Jackson in Madison, Wisconsin. She married J. Sherwood Weber in New York City in 1943.

Sherwood later married George Marks, a Canadian business executive. The couple and their children lived in Florida before moving, first to the United Kingdom and then to Canada.
