= Ladies' Date =

- Starring: Bruce Mayer
- Country of origin: United States

Production
- Running time: 30 minutes

Original release
- Network: DuMont
- Release: October 13, 1952 – July 31, 1953

Ladies' Date is a 1952-1953 American daytime television series that was broadcast on the DuMont Television Network. The program was an afternoon variety/audience participation show, hosted by Bruce Mayer, who had been the host of a similar series locally in Detroit.

== Overview ==
An audience-participation program, Ladies' Date included party games and stunts with features such as "Pen Pusher's Parade", "Notable Neighbor", "Lady for a Day", and "Ideal Mother-in-Law".

== Broadcast history ==
Meet the Ladies, a program that Mayer wrote and produced in Detroit, was the basis for Ladies' Date. It began on radio and then was televised, and it was the most popular daytime program in the Detroit area. When he moved to WABD-TV in New York, he sent 2,500 letters to organizations to invite women to participate in the new program.

Ladies' Date was broadcast from WABD. The program aired Monday through Friday from 1pm to 1:30pm ET from October 13, 1952, to July 31, 1953. Sandy Howard was the producer, and Jim Saunders was the director.

== Preservation status ==
As with most DuMont series, no episodes are known to exist.

== See also ==
- List of programs broadcast by the DuMont Television Network
- List of surviving DuMont Television Network broadcasts
- 1952–53 United States network television schedule (weekday)

== Bibliography ==
- David Weinstein, The Forgotten Network: DuMont and the Birth of American Television (Philadelphia: Temple University Press, 2004) ISBN 1-59213-245-6
- Alex McNeil, Total Television, Fourth edition (New York: Penguin Books, 1980) ISBN 0-14-024916-8
- Tim Brooks and Earle Marsh, The Complete Directory to Prime Time Network TV Shows, Third edition (New York: Ballantine Books, 1964) ISBN 0-345-31864-1
