= Ann Thomas =

Ann or Anne Thomas may refer to:

- Ann Maddocks, née Ann Thomas, Welsh maid
- Ann Griffiths, née Ann Thomas, Welsh writer
- Ann Thomas (curator) (born 1943), Canadian curator
- Anne Marsden Thomas (born 1948), English organist and pedagogue
- Ann Thomas (darts player) in World Masters (darts)

== See also ==
- Thomas (surname)
