= Frances Horwich =

American children's television host (1907–2001)

Frances Rappaport Horwich
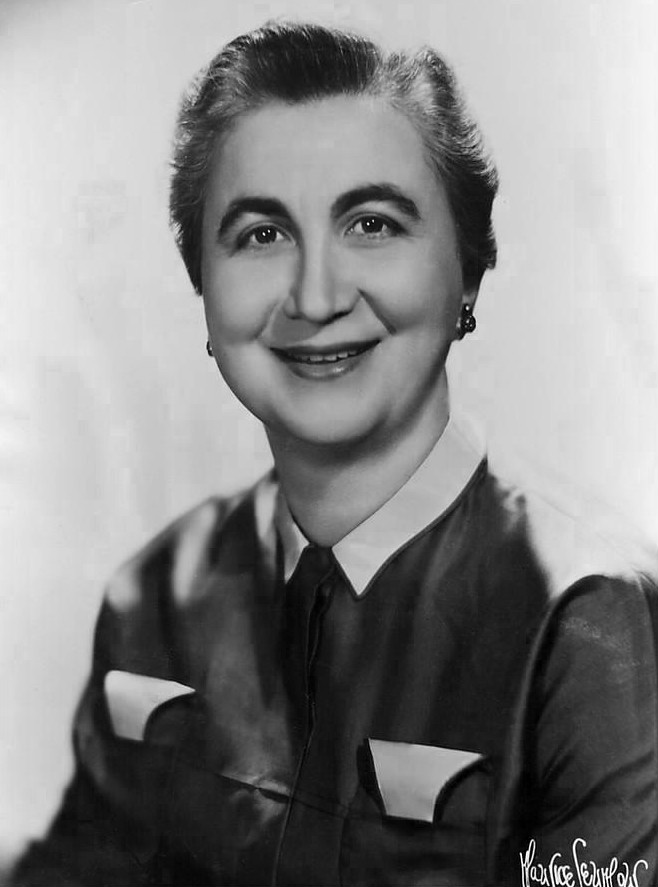
- Horwich in 1955
- Born: Frances Rappaport; July 16, 1907; Ottawa, Ohio, US
- Died: July 22, 2001 (aged 94); Scottsdale, Arizona, US
- Education: University of Chicago (S.B.); Columbia University (M.Ed.); Northwestern University (Ed.D.)
- Occupations: Television host Television executive Educator
- Years active: 1952–2001
- Known for: Ding Dong School

Frances Rappaport Horwich (born Frances Rappaport, July 16, 1907 – July 22, 2001) was an American educator, television personality and television executive. As Miss Frances, she was the host of the children's television program Ding Dong School, seen weekday mornings on the NBC network in the 1950s and nationally syndicated between 1959 and 1965.

== Family and education ==
Horwich was born on July 16, 1907, in Ottawa, Ohio. She was the daughter of Samuel and Rosa Gratz Rappaport. Her father had emigrated from Austria and owned a general store in the town. Her mother had emigrated from Russia; she was the youngest of their children. Her mother taught her children various types of needlework and crafts. Her father taught his children how to relate to people by giving each of them a chance to work at the store counter when they were tall enough to see over it. He sent all of his children to college; her two brothers became pediatricians and her two sisters also entered the health care field. She attended grammar and high school in Ottawa. Horwich was a bright student and was allowed to skip grades during her education. She described it as "being thrown out" of school and said she was "a badly-adjusted 15 year old" when she entered the University of Chicago.

Horwich earned her bachelor's degree at the University of Chicago in 1929; her first teaching assignment was a first grade class in Evanston, Illinois, from 1929 to 1932. She then became the supervisor of the Works Progress Administration's nursery schools in Chicago until 1935. She earned her master's degree in education at Columbia University in 1933 and directed junior kindergartens in Winnetka, Illinois, from 1935 to 1938. Horwich was named dean of education at Pestalozzi-Fröbel Teachers College in Chicago in 1938, where she worked until 1940.

She earned her doctorate at Northwestern University in 1942. While working toward her degree, Horwich was a counselor for students at Chicago Teachers College. She then left the Chicago area for a time, becoming the head of the Hessian Hills School at Croton-on-Hudson, New York, and teaching for two years at the University of North Carolina. When she returned to the Chicago area, she became the head of the department of education at Chicago's Roosevelt College beginning in 1946.

Horwich met her husband, Harvey, an attorney and Air Force historian, when both were religious school teachers at Chicago's KAM Temple. The two were married on July 11, 1931. The couple had no children.

== Ding Dong School ==
Ding Dong School was developed by the show's producer, Reinald Werrenrath Jr., and Judith Waller, director of public affairs programming for the NBC Central Division, for station WNBQ-TV (now WMAQ-TV). The concept of the show was to create a television nursery school with a television teacher while the pupils would be watching and participating from their homes. It was designed to be viewed from the height of a small child and cameras were adjusted to picture the set and host from that standpoint. Props were deliberately kept simple so they could be recognized by young children.

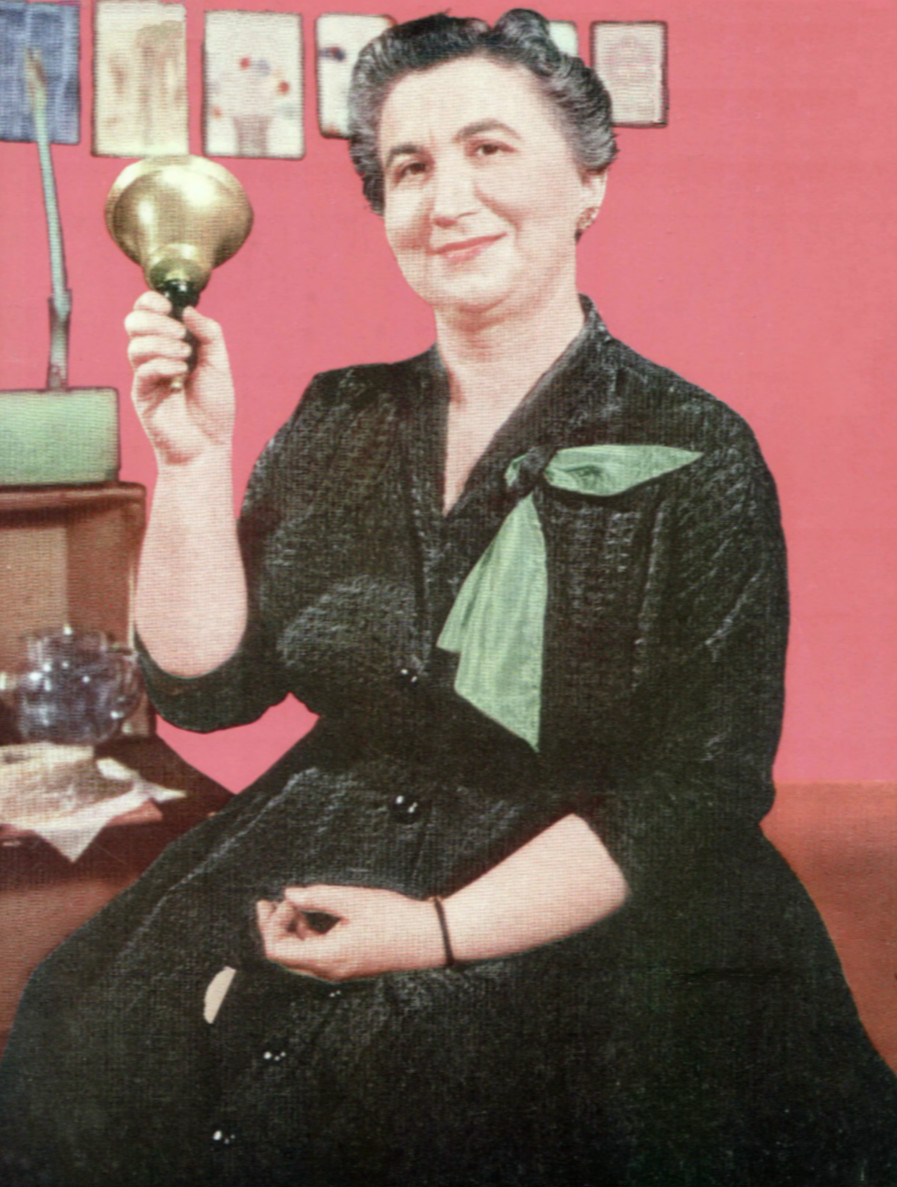
Horwich as Miss Frances beginning a Ding Dong School program

The development team made a list of people who seemed to be good candidates for the program. Horwich was one of those on the list; she was contacted and invited to audition for the show. Her only connection with television before this had been as part of discussion and panel shows which were televised. She was hesitant about being the only person on camera but agreed to audition. Horwich won the job and was still somewhat uneasy about being on television alone, but she decided to give it a try.

Initially the program was an experiment which was intended to air only once. Those watching the show's development and rehearsals were very skeptical about the venture. One station executive thought it was either the best or worst television show he had ever seen; another thought it would spell the end of television. The station's technical staff was also not encouraging. Two cameramen made remarks about the program when they believed they were out of earshot of Horwich. They did not realize that years of teaching in classrooms had made her a fine lip-reader.

Because it was felt that the show would be a terrible broadcasting mistake, it was decided to air it during the morning hours of October 2, 1952 with no publicity regarding it. No one was prepared for the 150 positive telephone calls the station received just after the show had aired or for the amount of viewer mail praising the program. The program was quickly scheduled for weekday morning local broadcast beginning in late 1952. Horwich was given two weeks to learn how to draw and paint as well as do puzzles upside down so they could be seen by the camera.

Each show began with the ringing of a hand-held school bell and the Ding Dong School song sung by Horwich. She then looked into the camera and asked, "How are you this morning?", giving her viewers at home time to answer the question. Horwich as "Miss Frances" conducted her television classes in the same manner as she would have if her students were in the same room with her. Those who subsequently adopted this style included Fred Rogers and the cast of Sesame Street. Activities could range from drawing, finger painting and using pipe cleaners or modeling clay to create an object. Various lessons such as how to cross streets safely were presented and the drawings sent in by children were viewed and discussed. Toward the end of the program, Horwich would ask her students to find mother and bring her to the television set. She then discussed what lessons and activities were done today and what supplies would be needed for future programs.

Although the program had only been on the air a short period of time, Frances Horwich won the George Foster Peabody Award for 1952. The show quickly gained popularity among young children and was broadcast nationally on the NBC network, Monday through Friday, beginning in March 1953. On the network, the show quickly had 2,400,000 daily viewers and was beating Arthur Godfrey's morning television program in the ratings. Horwich had a number of rights in her contract with NBC. She had the right of refusal of program sponsors. When the network wanted to extend the show to one hour and when it wanted to move it from mornings to afternoons, Horwich was able to refuse both requests. She was named Woman of the Year in Education by the Associated Press for 1953. She was the author of many Ding Dong School branded books for children; the network also produced Ding Dong School merchandise such as pencils and coloring books. Horwich only endorsed items which were not expensive and were educational. By 1956, Horwich had written 25 children's books, made 11 Ding Dong School records and 30 manufacturers sold show-branded products. A PTA for Ding Dong School was established to help parents and Horwich communicate.

== Sudden celebrity ==
The couple's lifestyle changed dramatically after Ding Dong School. Horwich rose at 4:30 AM on weekdays to go over her lesson plan for the day's broadcast and was in bed by 9 PM She often spent the evening preparing props for the next day. A move from Evanston to an apartment on Chicago's near north side was necessary because of the 45 minute commuting time to Chicago's Loop. Neither Horwich nor her husband were prepared for the way the television show made Horwich a celebrity. Horwich's husband, Harvey, had been in Korea with the Air Force during the planning stages of Ding Dong School. When he arrived home, the couple planned a vacation in the Bahamas. Since Horwich did not like to repeat programs, she recorded kinescopes to be broadcast while she was away. When the couple boarded their flight to Miami, 14 young children were also on the plane with their families. The children recognized "Miss Frances" and sang the Ding Dong School song all the way to Miami. After arriving in the Bahamas, the couple believed they could now begin their holiday. On the second night of their stay in the hotel, the restaurant's calypso band began playing the Ding Dong School song as Horwich and her husband entered the dining room. Her husband viewed all of this with good humor, saying, "Just call me Mr. Frances".

Everyday life no longer had many routine aspects for Horwich after Ding Dong School. After she had been on the air for two weeks, Horwich stopped in a shop for a cup of coffee. Before she could take a sip, a woman came up and said loudly that she never thought her child would see Miss Frances drinking coffee. The store became silent. Horwich then greeted the woman's children and left the shop. On what might be considered an average day, she was stopped 17 times by both parents and children when walking a block down the street. Children were amazed to see her away from the television screen and would often poke her to make sure she was real. The couple's social life became restricted to Saturday evenings because of the early morning hours needed for the weekday program. Horwich made some personal appearances; when she did, the crowds were larger than those for many film stars. She stated that she shook 17,000 hands when making her first personal appearance. A personal appearance at a Boston department store drew 12,000 people—children and parents. (Note: Horwich decided to make personal appearances when it was learned that many children were trying to break their television set's glass or open its back to "free" her.)

== Children's programming ==
In 1954, Horwich was appointed Head of Children's Programming for the NBC television network, where she supervised all of NBC's children's programming. She moved to New York in early 1955 and Ding Dong School was then broadcast from New York. In late 1955, New York Times columnist Jack Gould cautioned Horwich over the use of a commercial for vitamins, implying that she inadvertently had encouraged children to swallow all pills that they found pleasing to look at: She "demonstrated how pretty the red pills were and how easy to swallow they were. 'To put it as mildly as possible, Dr. Horwich has gone a step too far in letting a commercial consideration jeopardize her responsibility to the young children whose faith and trust she solicits.'" She remained Head of Children's Programming until 1956, when Ding Dong School was canceled in favor of The Price Is Right. Horwich resigned from NBC in protest of the commercialism of children's education. She refused to advertise products a child could not use or that appeared to glorify violence. She was asked to accept a sponsor whose product was BB guns; when Horwich refused, Ding Dong School was canceled. (Note: It is said Horwich was given an ultimatum: to accept this sponsor or Ding Dong School would be canceled. The person said to have delivered this message was Robert W. Sarnoff, son of David Sarnoff.) Horwich resigned from her position, but the network refused to accept her resignation.

Since Horwich owned the rights to Ding Dong School, she was able to sign with Chicago's WGN-TV to broadcast the show beginning in August 1958; the program had been off the air since being canceled by NBC. Horwich and her husband moved to Hollywood in 1959 for taping and syndication of the show, The show was syndicated until 1965. Beginning in 1962, she also served as an advisor on children's activities for Curtis Publishing Company. In 1965, Horwich was hired as the Director of Children's Programming for the new UHF television station in Chicago, WFLD. In 1970, Horwich discovered she was two quarters of work short of qualifying for her American Federation of Television and Radio Artists pension. She was hired to do some specials on education by WMAQ-TV.

== Later years ==
Horwich moved to Scottsdale, Arizona, in 1973 because of her husband's health; Harvey died in 1974. After moving to Arizona, she did some lecturing at Arizona State University and worked at a local public broadcasting television station. Horwich died of congestive heart failure on 22 July 2001 at the age of 94.

A month before her death, Horwich was inducted into the Silver Circle of the Chicago Chapter of the National Academy of the Television Arts and Sciences on June 2, 2001. The awards honor those who have worked 25 years or more in television and have made significant contributions to the local industry. In 2006, an Ohio Historical Marker commemorating her life was placed by the local Daughters of the American Revolution chapter in Ottawa.

== Books by Frances Horwich ==
=== For parents ===
- Horwich, Frances R.; Werrenrath, Reinald Jr. (1956). Have Fun With Your Children. Prentice-Hall. OCLC 951928336.
- Horwich, Frances R. (1959). The Magic of Bringing Up Your Child. McGraw-Hill. OCLC 177617.

=== For children ===
- Horwich, Frances R.; Werrenrath, Reinald Jr. (1953). The Baby Chipmunk. Rand McNally. OCLC 6513907.
- Horwich, Frances R.; Werrenrath, Reinald Jr. (1953). Daddy's Birthday Cakes. Rand McNally. OCLC 6513878.
- Horwich, Frances R.; Werrenrath, Reinald Jr. (1953). A Day Downtown With Daddy. Rand McNally. OCLC 7590923.
- Horwich, Frances R.; Werrenrath, Reinald Jr. (1953). Dressing Up. Rand McNally. OCLC 11926790.
- Horwich, Frances R.; Werrenrath, Reinald Jr. (1953). I Decided. Rand McNally. OCLC 6536852.
- Horwich, Frances R.; Werrenrath, Reinald Jr. (1953). A Suitcase With a Surprise. Rand McNally. OCLC 11926795.
- Horwich, Frances R.; Werrenrath, Reinald Jr; Neebe, William (1953). Your Friend, the Policeman. Rand McNally. OCLC 6967742.
- Horwich, Frances R.; Werrenrath, Reinald Jr; Wehr, Adele (1954). Debbie and Her Nap. Rand McNally. OCLC 901376452.
- Horwich, Frances R.; Werrenrath, Reinald Jr.; Flory, Jane (1954). Dolls of Other Lands. Rand McNally. OCLC 6513860.
- Horwich, Frances R. (1954). Grandmother is Coming. Rand McNally. OCLC 3453151.
- Horwich, Frances R.; Werrenrath, Reinald Jr.; Van Tellingen, Ruth Thompson (1954). Growing Things. Rand McNally. OCLC 6212984.
- Horwich, Frances R. (1954). In My House. Rand McNally. OCLC 6514184.
- Horwich, Frances R. (1954). Looking Out the Window. Rand McNally. OCLC 6514188.
- Horwich, Frances R.; Werrenrath, Reinald Jr. (1954). Miss Frances' All-Day-Long Book. Rand McNally. OCLC 1636786.
- Horwich, Frances R. (1954). My Big Brother. Rand McNally. OCLC 6523547.
- Horwich, Frances R.; Werrenrath, Reinald Jr. (1954). My Goldfish. Rand McNally. OCLC 4921832.
- Horwich, Frances R.; Werrenrath, Reinald Jr.; Evans, Katherine (1954). Peek In. Rand McNally. OCLC 6536900.
- Horwich, Frances R. (1954). The Robin Family. Rand McNally. OCLC 6536921.
- Horwich, Frances R. (1955). Jingle Bell Jack. Rand McNally. OCLC 18791919.
- Horwich, Frances R.; Webbe, Elizabeth (1955). The Magic Wagon. Golden Press. OCLC 53353158.
- Horwich, Frances R.; Bendel, Ruth (1955). Lucky Rabbit. Rand McNally. OCLC 51324521.
- Horwich, Frances R. (1955). Mr. Meyer's Cow. Rand McNally. OCLC 18791921.
- Horwich, Frances R.; Grider, Dorothy (1955). We Love Grandpa. Golden Press. OCLC 26792645.
- Horwich, Frances R. (1956). The Big Coal Truck. Rand McNally. OCLC 7590931.
- Horwich, Frances R. (1956). Here Comes the Band. Rand McNally. OCLC 22609720.
- Horwich, Frances R. (1956). Miss Frances' Story Book of Pets for the Very Young. Rand McNally. OCLC 7435576.
- Horwich, Frances R. (1956). Our Baby. Golden Press. OCLC 62948561.
- Horwich, Frances R.; Werrenrath, Reinald Jr. (1960). The Ding Dong School Book. Golden Press. OCLC 1410187.
- Horwich, Frances R. (1960). Miss Frances' Storybook of Manners for the Very Young. Golden Press. OCLC 1405140.
- Horwich, Frances R. (1962). Miss Frances of Ding Dong School Selects. Doubleday. OCLC 704525352.
- Horwich, Frances R. (1966). My Daddy is a Policeman. Rand McNally. OCLC 7961696.

== Sources cited ==
- Davis, Michael (2008). Street Gang: The Complete History of Sesame Street. Penguin. ISBN 978-0-6700-1996-0.
- Gould, Lewis L. (2002). Watching Television Come of Age The New York Times Reviews by Jack Gould. University of Texas Press. ISBN 0-292-72844-1 – via Project MUSE.
- Hayes, Dade (2008). Anytime Playdate: Inside the Preschool Entertainment Boom, or, How Television Became My Baby's Best Friend. Simon & Schuster. ISBN 978-1-4165-6433-1.
- LoBrutto, Vincent (2017). TV in the USA: A History of Icons, Idols, and Ideas [3 volumes]. ABC-CLIO. ISBN 978-1-4408-2973-4.
- O'Dell, Cary (1997). Women Pioneers in Television: Biographies of Fifteen Industry Leaders. McFarland. ISBN 978-0-7864-0167-3. "judith waller."
- Ohles, Frederik; Ohles, Shirley M.; Ramsay, John G. (1997). Biographical Dictionary of Modern American Educators. Greenwood Publishing Group. p. 168. ISBN 978-0-3132-9133-3. "frances horwich."
- Okuda, Ted; Mulqueen, Jack (2016). The Golden Age of Chicago Children's Television. Southern Illinois University Press. ISBN 978-0-8093-3536-7.
- Roberts, Kate; Scher, Adam (2014). Toys of the 50s, 60s and 70s. Minnesota Historical Society Press. ISBN 978-0-8735-1941-0.
