= Turkish Taffy =

Candy bar

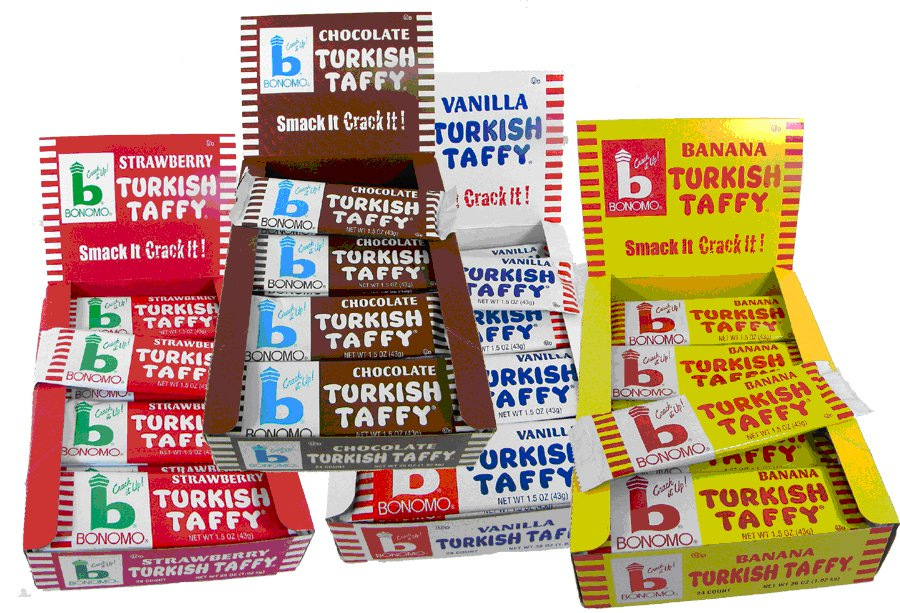
Turkish Taffy packaging

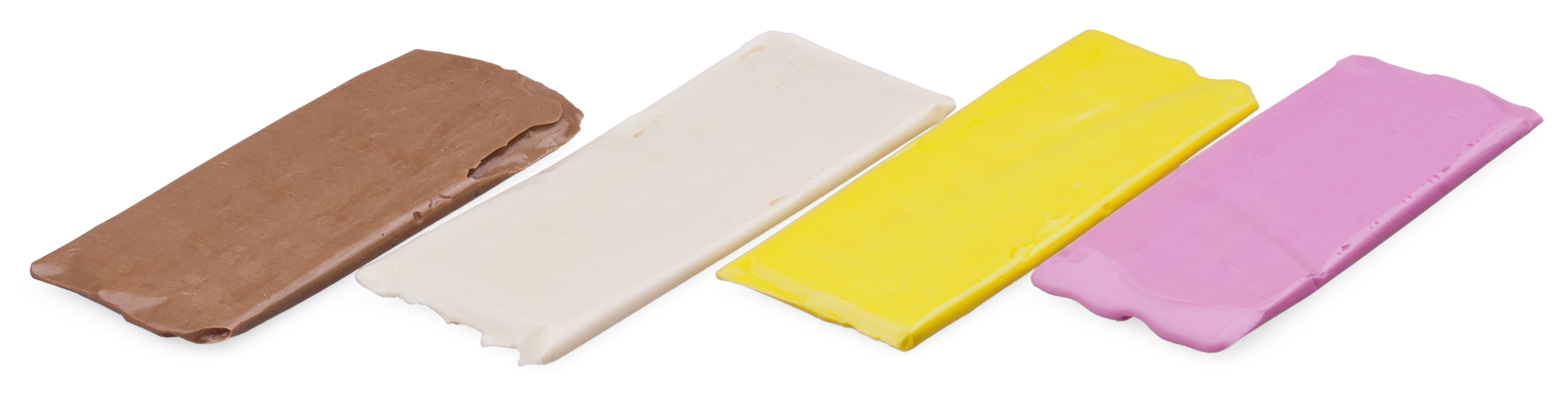
Unwrapped taffy

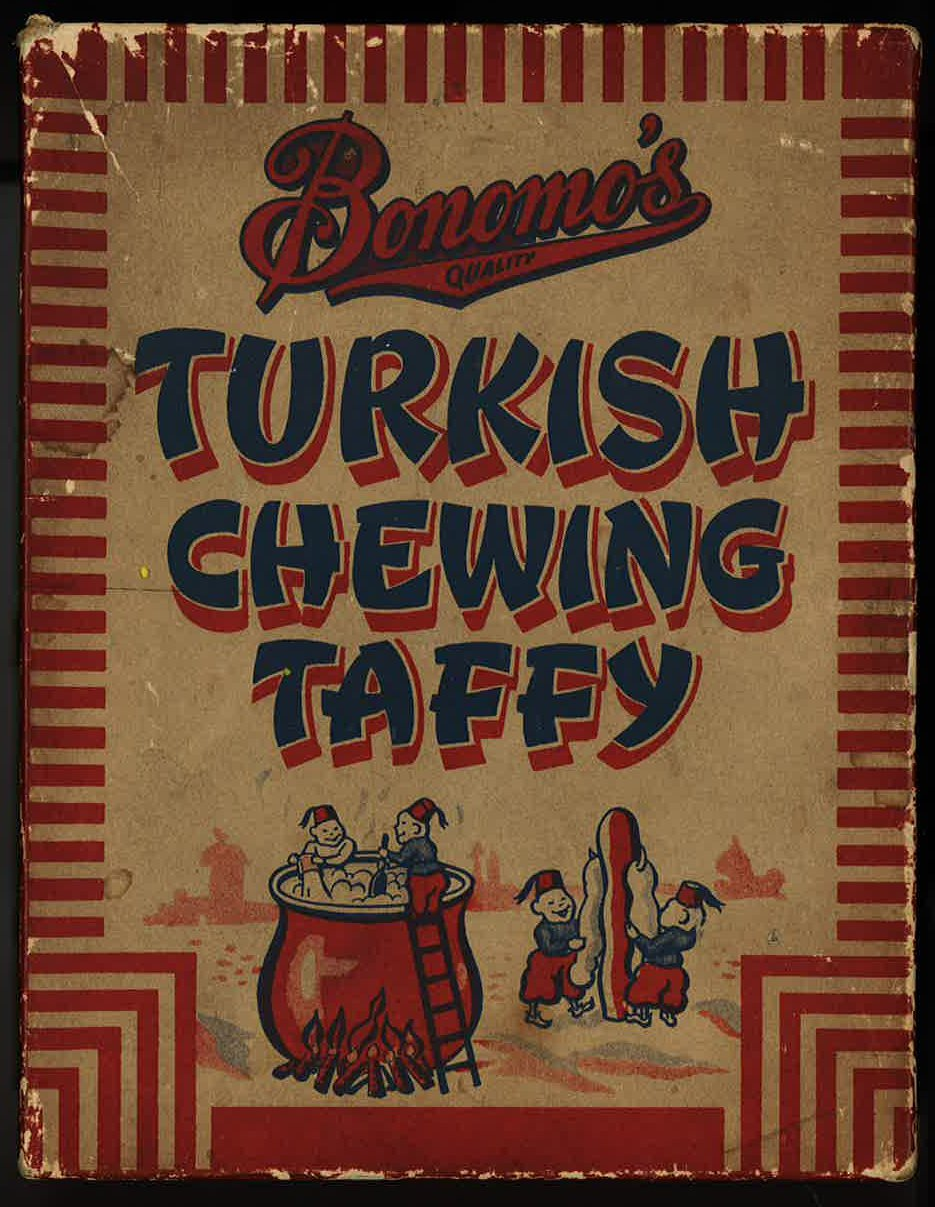
Early label of Bonomo Turkish Taffy

Turkish Taffy is a chewy taffy-like candy bar, which comes in several flavors.

== History ==
Turkish Taffy was invented in 1912 by Austrian immigrant Herman Herer in Rahway, New Jersey. He sold the rights to M. Schwarz & Sons of Newark, New Jersey, which were acquired in 1936 by Victor Bonomo, a Sephardic Jew whose father, Albert J. Bonomo, had emigrated from İzmir, Turkey, and founded the Bonomo Company in Coney Island, New York, in 1897 to produce saltwater taffy and hard candies.

According to Tico Bonomo, son of Victor, Turkish Taffy "was not really a taffy, but what is technically known as a short nougat," consisting of a batter of corn syrup and egg whites that was cooked and then baked. It was also not Turkish but was created after World War II in the Bonomo factory. It has been marketed in vanilla, chocolate, strawberry, and banana flavors.

Turkish Taffy was originally sold in large sheets to Woolworth's stores, where pieces were broken off with a ball-peen hammer at the counter and sold by weight. In the late 1940s, the company released a version in candy-bar size which the purchaser could whack against a hard surface to break into bite-sized pieces. This property of being shattered or broken by sudden shock but still pliable and soft when chewed is possible because the candy is a non-Newtonian fluid. Since the pieces were both chewy and slow-melting in the mouth, it was a favorite for the frugal customer. A bar still cost 5¢ in the 1960s. By that time, it was marketed by Gold Medal Candy Corporation of Brooklyn, New York.

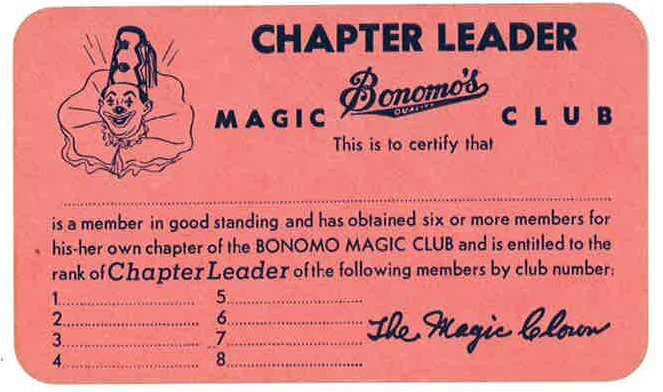
Fan club membership card for The Magic Clown children's television series, with the Bonomo logo

In 1949, Turkish Taffy became one of the first forms of candy advertised and marketed on television when Bonomo created and sponsored The Magic Clown on NBC Television. Tico Bonomo specifically cited the decision to use television as instrumental in the popularity of the candy-bar sized taffys.

In 1980, the candy became part of the Tootsie Roll Industries of Chicago line of candies. It was discontinued in 1989.

== Return of Bonomo's Turkish Taffy ==
In 2003, Bonomo Turkish Taffy, LLC created a website proclaiming the return of Bonomo Turkish Taffy and accepting advance orders. A press release issued by The Warrell Corporation on April 8, 2010, said the product would be available in stores in July 2010 and samples were available for preview to the confectionery industry at the National Confectioners Association's annual "Sweets and Snacks Expo" May 23–27, 2010.

Bonomo's Turkish Taffy made its official re-debut to the general public July 2, 2010, at IT'SUGAR in Atlantic City.

== Flavors ==
Current flavors of Bonomo's Turkish Taffy include Vanilla, Chocolate, Strawberry and Banana.

In 2012, Bonomo introduced two new flavors, Blue Raspberry and Wild Cherry.

== See also ==
- Laffy Taffy
- List of confectionery brands
