= Sam Kressen =

American actor

Sam Kressen (October 5, 1918 - December 27, 1991) was an American actor known for his portrayal of Benjamin Franklin.

== Early years ==
Kressen was a native of Philadelphia. During his years at that city's Central High School, he took classes in debate, oratory, and public speaking. After graduation, he acted with the Neighborhood Players, which later became the Society Hill Playhouse. He also was a graduate of the University of Pennsylvania.

== Career ==
Kressen began portraying Ben Franklin in 1956, taking on the role for a variety of events. His association with Franklin became more widely known when he played the character in the national company's production of the musical 1776 in 1970 and 1971, and he continued playing that part in the Independence Mall Theatre's production of 1776 in 1976. In 1988, Krassen performed in a production of 1776 for the 600th time as the play continued at Paper Mill Playhouse in Millburn, New Jersey.

Kressen also acted on Broadway, portraying Mr. Korngold in Golden Rainbow (1968), and in touring companies of Funny Girl, Luther, Mame, and The Andersonville Trial. Additionally, he performed in regional theaters, including the Camden County Music Fair and the Storrowton Music Fair.

Off stage, Kressen conducted tours of Philadelphia, designed stationery and other items for theatrical companies and taught actors. Before he became an actor, he sold jewels for a diamond company in Philadelphia.

In 1975, Kressen (in his Franklin persona) was featured on posters and souvenir cards produced by a publishing company in Philadelphia.
