= The Magic Clown =

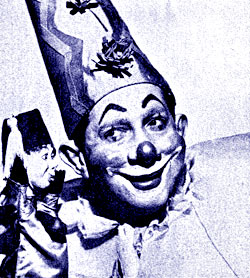
- Zovello, the Magic Clown, and "Laffy" (NBC promotional photo, 1951).
- Created by: Tico Bonomo
- Starring: Zovello (1949–1952); Dick DuBois (1952–1958); Doug Anderson (1958–1959); James Randi (1970–1971)
- Country of origin: United States

Production
- Running time: 15 minutes

Original release
- Network: NBC (1949–1954); WABD (1954–1958); WNTA (1958–1959); Syndicated (1970–1971)
- Release: September 11, 1949 – July 24, 1959

The Magic Clown is an NBC TV series which ran from 1949 to 1954. The final NBC broadcast was on June 27, 1954. The show then moved to WABD where it stayed until 1958. After that, it was renamed Bonomo, The Magic Clown and was broadcast on WNTA from September 29, 1958 to July 24, 1959. The show was sponsored by Bonomo Turkish Taffy. Josh Norris, who used the stage name "Zovello", was the first Magic Clown, and went on to a successful career as a full-time magician.

== Premise ==
The show featured a clown, at first referred to only as "The Magic Clown," but later renamed Bonomo after the show's sponsor, performing magic tricks, sometimes with the help of his puppet Laffy.

The show was created by Tico Bonomo, grandson of the founder of the Bonomo Turkish Taffy company, specifically as a vehicle to sell candy. As a result, each episode featured constant plugs for the sponsor, and some consider this show to be an early infomercial.

Development of the show took more than a year; fresh out of Syracuse University, Bonomo went to work creating The Magic Clown. In a 1994 interview, Bonomo recalled the hard work that went into the program: "I spent the summer of 1948 with writers and producers and an advertising agency," recalls Bonomo. "Those days I worked a seven-day week. The program was on Sundays so I was at NBC every single Sunday at 8 a.m. and we were on the air at 11:30 a.m."

== Cast ==
The action of the program centered around its eponymous host. Tico Bonomo said that finding a host wasn't easy. "You can't teach clowns to do magic, you have to have a magician and turn him into a clown. And, believe me, it's tough teaching a good magician to put on white face and act like a clown."

The first "Magic Clown" was known only by his stage name, Zovello, and hosted the program from its inception in 1949 until 1952. At that time, a comedian named Richard DuBois took over, serving even after the show was cancelled by NBC and moved to DuMont-owned WABD, until 1958, when the show moved to Newark, New Jersey–based WNTA.

The WNTA run was hosted by comedian, mimic, cartoonist, and puppeteer Doug Anderson, with assistance from his wife, former model Gayle Anderson. The couple added new segments to the show, including informational pieces and in-studio interviews as the show expanded from a weekly to a weekday basis. The Andersons, however, choked at the amount of creative control the sponsor had over the show, and the show was cancelled after only one year on WNTA.

A short-lived revival of the program, produced in Toronto, Ontario, Canada, was created for syndication in 1970. The Magic Clown was performed in this version by James Randi.

== Reception ==
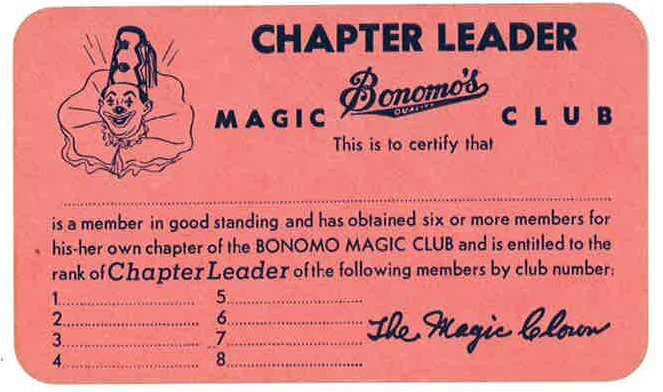
Fan club membership card for The Magic Clown

The show was well received by young audiences in both New York and New Jersey, although there is no record of how it was received nationally. Most modern reviews have panned the show, with some calling it "unintentionally hilarious". However, a reviewer at the Internet Archive called it "delightful".

Tico Bonomo claimed that the show was responsible for greatly increasing sales of Turkish Taffy. "Introducing our candy on television allowed us to take a product like Turkish Taffy, which was one that you had to fight for distribution, and make it a big success."

== Episode status ==
As with much of NBC's daytime programming of the 1950s, few episodes exist of The Magic Clown today. One episode appears on a DVD box set by Shout! Factory, while two episodes appear on a DVD by Shokus Video and in the Mill Creek DVD set "Classic Game Shows & More". Much of the surviving content from the series has lapsed into the public domain.

Archivist Ira Gallen is known to have several episodes in his collection.
