= Glamour Girl (TV series) =

American audience-participation TV series (1953–1954)

- Directed by: Bill Bennington
- Presented by: Harry Babbitt; Jack McCoy
- Music by: Gaylord Carter
- Country of origin: United States

Production
- Executive producer: Jack McCoy
- Producer: Don Ross

Original release
- Network: NBC
- Release: January 6, 1953 – January 8, 1954

Glamour Girl is an American audience-participation television series that was broadcast on NBC from July 6, 1953, until January 8, 1954. Harry Babbitt was the initial host, with Jack McCoy replacing him in October 1953.

== Format ==
Calling itself the program "that proves that every woman can be glamorous", Glamour Girl focused on techniques "designed to make the average woman a glamour girl", providing advice on beauty treatments and wardrobe and similar tips. Each episode featured four women from the studio audience, with each explaining why she wanted to be the Glamour Girl for that day. The winner received a vacation trip, a 24-hour beauty treatment, and other gifts. The total value of gifts presented each day exceeded $4000. Usually "women won for having the saddest life story, expressing the greatest need, and generating the most audience applause and sympathy."

Immediately after the episode ended, the winner was filmed as she looked that day. Then the transformation began, lasting until nearly midnight. Overseen by Mary Webb Davis, who was head of a modeling school, the woman learned correct posture and "how to walk, talk, gesture and wear makeup." Those activities ended around midnight, to allow time for the winner to sleep.

The next day Davis's assistant accompanied the woman to a beauty salon while Davis shopped for clothes to match the new image. Before the next episode began, the winner returned to a private room at the studio, staying out of sight until she was brought on stage immediately after showing of the film of how she looked at the end of the previous episode. Walter Ames wrote in the Los Angeles Times, "It's a dramatic moment bringing ohs and ahs from the studio audience that must be repeated in many homes all over the country." One winner said of the experience: "It was like being psychoanalyzed at first, but I soon saw the results in the mirror." When she returned to the program for her post-makeover appearance, she said, "I heard gasps from the audience and thunderous applause. I knew they were seeing me as a new person."

Davis said that the transformation went beyond physical change, with the real basis being psychological. She cited one winner who "feels different and happy inside, so she looks beautiful outside."

Contestants included:

- one woman whose husband had left her and four children a month earlier. She had low blood pressure and a sister in an institution
- one who was overweight, had three children, and whose husband had an incurable disease
- one in her mid-60s who "sought glamour to ward off old age"
- one who worked as her husband's secretary at no salary and feared that he might hire a more glamorous secretary to replace her.

In one case, the program enabled a reconciliation between a winner and her husband, who had been separated for three weeks when she appeared on the show. He was not aware of her appearance on the program until the show's office contacted him, but he wanted to reconcile with her. They were reunited at the studio where the series was filmed.

Viewers' desire to appear on Glamour Girl resulted in the show's receiving as many as 250,000 letters in one month, with each writer wanting to be selected as a participant.

== Production ==
McCoy was the executive producer, Don Ross was the producer, and Bill Bennington was the director. Gaylord Carter was the music director. Shirley Buchanan and Jean Morehead were fashion models on the program. Glamour Girl was broadcast Mondays through Fridays from 10:30 to 11 a.m Eastern Time. Its competition included Arthur Godfrey Time, Wheel of Fortune, and The Jack Paar Show. It originated from KNBH-TV in Hollywood and was sustaining.

== Promotions ==
During the first week of October 1953, Glamour Girl offered to provide tips for improvements for viewers who sent letters and enclosed photographs of themselves. That promotion ended early when the glamour experts were overwhelmed by 30,000 letters. The next week, the show offered to provide one viewer with "a trip to Hollywood, an appearance on the show, and a full glamour treatment." The response brought 42,000 letters to the network in that week.

== Lawsuit ==
In the fall of 1953, cosmetics manufacturer Ern Westmore and Hallmark Productions Incorporated filed an infringement suit for $500,000 saying that Glamour Girl was a copy of The Ern Westmore Hollywood Glamour Show (also known as The Ern Westmore Show). The suit, filed in Los Angeles Superior Court, named as defendants NBC, Ross, McCoy, and Frank Cooper Assoc. (Glamour Girl's packager). The suit said that Westmore submitted his program to NBC in the fall of 1951 and that it had been broadcast on TV stations in Miami, Birmingham, and Cincinnati.

== Critical response ==
A review in The New York Times said that by carrying Glamour Girl, NBC's morning TV schedule had "deteriorated to an unbearably low level", calling the program "a show that exploits human misery and intentionally victimizes the innocent people who appear." It pointed out that in order to win the daily competition each contestant was "encouraged to tell pitiful and tragic things about her personal life." The review added that a glamour program for women "could really be fun, but N. B. C. has chosen to play it offensively for tears instead of laughs."

Dwight Newton, writing in the San Francisco Examiner, called Babbitt "as courteous and friendly an emcee as any nervous TV guest could hope to encounter", but he said that the program was "unoriginal, unimaginative, uninspired."

Ellis Walker wrote in the Daily Palo Alto Times that the program's glamourization of women was sure to attract female viewers: "From day to day, they watch while frumpish-appearing women of varying ages are converted to fashionable femmes fatale — or something. 'This could happen to me' is the inevitable thought likely to pass through the viewer's frowsy head. 'Just let me get down to Hollywood.'" Walker noted that Babbitt made participants feel at ease on the show, and he concluded, "Now I wonder if it could be pity that keeps Babbitt in such a reserved state of conduct?"
