= Ding Dong School =

American television program (1952–1956)

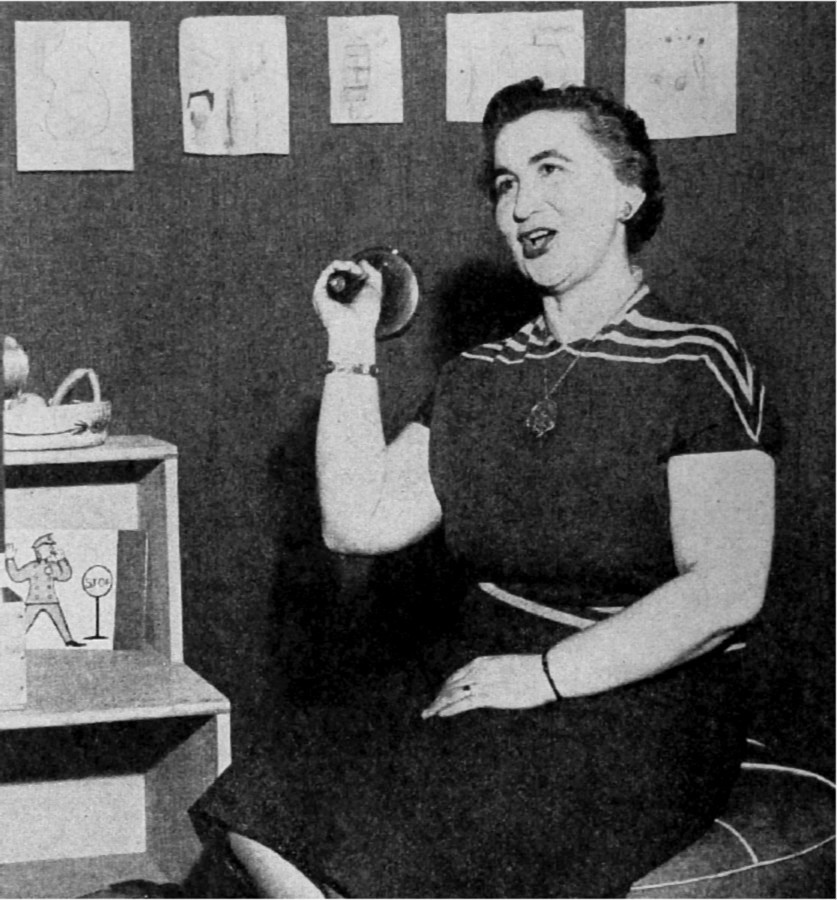
- Miss Frances on the air in 1953
- Presented by: Frances Horwich
- Country of origin: United States

Production
- Running time: 25 minutes

Original release
- Network: NBC
- Release: November 24, 1952 – December 28, 1956

Ding Dong School, billed as "the nursery school of the air", is an American children's television series that began on WNBQ-TV (now WMAQ-TV) in Chicago, Illinois, a few months before its four-year run on NBC (albeit still produced in the WNBQ studios). It is the earliest known preschool series to be produced in the United States, predating Romper Room by a year.

The program was presented from a child's point of view. A 1953 magazine article reported, "Low-angled cameras see everything at Lilliputian eye-level, stories and activities are paced at the slow rate just right for small ears and hands." Each program began with Miss Frances ringing a hand-held school bell.

A precursor to Sesame Street and Mister Rogers' Neighborhood, the show was hosted live by Frances Horwich (aka "Miss Frances"), and at one point was the most popular TV series aimed at preschoolers. The program began in 1952 at Chicago's WNBQ television. After six weeks on the air locally, the program was picked up by the NBC television network. At the height of its popularity, Ding Dong School had three million viewers.

== Origins ==
The idea for the program came from a conversation between WNBQ's program director and the director of public service and educational programming Judith Waller. The program director told Waller there were more than 235,000 preschool children in the Chicago area, then he asked her what she planned to do about it. A team was formed to explore the possibilities of educational television programming to serve this young market. It was decided to produce a nursery school program in which a teacher on television would instruct students watching at home. The team also designed the show to be viewed from the standpoint of a small child. Camera shots would be taken from this vantage point and any props used would need to be items easily recognized by young children.

After the format of the program was determined, the next step was to find the right person to host the show. A list of educators who were possible candidates was compiled, and those on the list were invited to audition for the program. One of the educators on the list was Frances Horwich, who was head of the education department at Chicago's Roosevelt College. Horwich was an experienced nursery school teacher, but her only experience in television had been when participating in televised panel and discussion programs. Since there would be no class of children in the television studio, the person hosting the show would be alone on the set and on camera. The thought of this was somewhat frightening to Horwich, but she auditioned and won the job. She was willing to give the program a try. The program was named by producer Reinald Werrenrath's three-year-old son, Peter. When he was told that a ringing school bell would begin each program, he began calling it Ding Dong School.

== Going on the air ==
Many local NBC executives who were watching the show's development and its rehearsals, were very skeptical about its chances for television survival. The station's general manager viewed the program as either the worst or best television program he had ever seen; another executive thought the show would bring an end to television broadcasting and revive radio programs. Since those in charge believed the program was a mistake, it was decided to air it only once. The show was scheduled to be aired in the morning of October 2, 1952 and the station deliberately issued no publicity releases regarding it.

Since the executives at WNBQ held that the program had no future, no one was prepared for the 150 telephone calls in support of the show which were received immediately after it aired. These calls were followed by a large amount of positive viewer mail. The amount of positive viewer response was such that the executives reversed their decision and quickly made room in their weekday morning schedule for Ding Dong School. With the program now scheduled to be aired every weekday morning, Horwich had two weeks to master the art of drawing, painting and doing puzzles upside-down for the television camera.

== The program ==
=== NBC Chicago ===
Horwich as Miss Frances, began each show by ringing a hand-held school bell and singing the Ding Dong School song. She then looked directly into the camera and asked, "How are you this morning?" Just as she would in a classroom, Horwich paused a while to allow her class to answer the question. The entire program was conducted as if there was a live class of children on the television set. (Note: The style was also used later on Mister Rogers' Neighborhood and Sesame Street.) Activities ranged from finger painting, making toys with pipe cleaners, modeling clay or drawing. Lessons on things like safety when crossing streets were also presented. Many children drew pictures and sent them to Miss Frances; these drawings were displayed and discussed. Before the end of each program, Horwich would ask the children at home to bring mother to the television set. She would then recap what lessons and activities were covered that day and what supplies were needed for future programs.

Despite the fact that it had aired for a short time, the program won a George Foster Peabody Award for 1952. The show was popular enough locally that it became a weekday network program in early 1953. Within two months of joining the network, Ding Dong School had 2,400,000 daily viewers. It was also beating Arthur Godfrey's morning television program in the ratings. Horwich owned the rights to the program and also received certain rights through her contract with NBC. The program attracted many sponsors and Horwich had the right of refusal of them. She refused sponsors whose products had any connection with violence and insisted advertised products had to be items used by children. Other requests came from companies hoping to produce Ding Dong School licensed merchandise such as coloring books and crayons. Horwich insisted licensed items would not be expensive and would be educational. There were 25 books written by Horwich, 11 Ding Dong School records and 30 companies selling licensed items by 1956. A Ding Dong School PTA was organized so Horwich and parents could share their views.

=== NBC New York ===
In 1954, Horwich became Head of Children's Programming for the NBC television network. She moved to New York in early 1955 and Ding Dong School was then broadcast from there. She remained in this position until 1956 when Ding Dong School was canceled; replacing it would be The Price Is Right, hosted by Bill Cullen. Horwich had previously refused a network request to expand Ding Dong School from 30 minutes to a one-hour daily program. as she felt young children should not watch television for more than a half-hour at a time. NBC also wanted to move the program from mornings to either late morning or early afternoon; this request was also refused by Horwich. (Note: It is said the person who delivered the ultimatum was Robert W. Sarnoff, the son of David Sarnoff.) Horwich was asked to accept commercials from a sponsor who made BB guns. When she refused, she was told Ding Dong School would be canceled. When the program was canceled, Horwich resigned from her network position, but NBC refused to accept her resignation.

=== Ding Dong School again ===
After being canceled by NBC, the program remained off the air until Horwich returned to Chicago and signed an agreement with WGN-TV to air the show locally beginning in 1958. Because Horwich owned the rights to Ding Dong School, she was able to have the program on the air in Chicago and to syndicate the program through a California company beginning in 1959. The program was syndicated until 1965.

Five NBC kinescoped episodes from 1954-1955 are housed at the Library of Congress, in the J. Fred and Leslie W. MacDonald Collection.

== See also ==
- Romper Room

== Sources cited ==
- Davis, Michael (2008). Street Gang: The Complete History of Sesame Street. Penguin. ISBN 978-0-6700-1996-0.
- Hayes, Dade (2008). Anytime Playdate: Inside the Preschool Entertainment Boom, or, How Television Became My Baby's Best Friend. Simon & Schuster. ISBN 978-1-4165-6433-1.
- LoBrutto, Vincent (2017). TV in the USA: A History of Icons, Idols, and Ideas [3 volumes]. ABC-CLIO. ISBN 978-1-4408-2973-4.
- O'Dell, Cary (1997). Women Pioneers in Television: Biographies of Fifteen Industry Leaders. McFarland. ISBN 978-0-7864-0167-3. "judith waller."
- Ohles, Frederik; Ohles, Shirley M.; Ramsay, John G. (1997). Biographical Dictionary of Modern American Educators. Greenwood Publishing Group. p. 168. ISBN 978-0-3132-9133-3. "frances horwich."
- Okuda, Ted; Mulqueen, Jack (2016). The Golden Age of Chicago Children's Television. Southern Illinois University Press. ISBN 978-0-8093-3536-7.
- Roberts, Kate; Scher, Adam (2014). Toys of the 50s, 60s and 70s. Minnesota Historical Society Press. ISBN 978-0-8735-1941-0.
