= Frances Helm =

American actress (1923–2006)

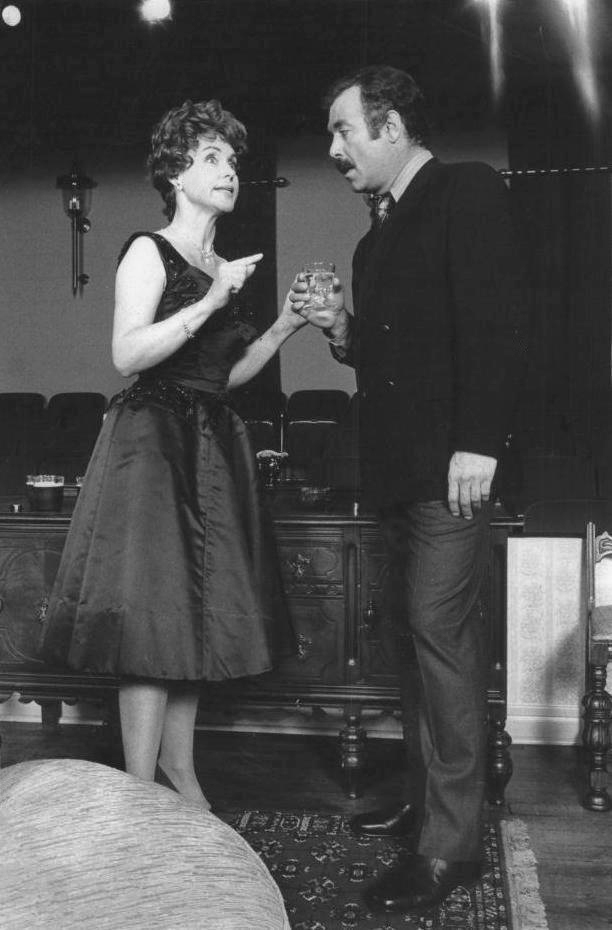
- Helm and Pernell Roberts in the play Welcome Home in 1972
- Born: Mary Frances Helm; October 14, 1923; Panama City, Florida, U.S.
- Died: December 30, 2006 (aged 83); New York City, U.S.
- Education: Richmond Professional Institute
- Occupation: Actress
- Years active: 1946–1995
- Spouses: Robert Alba Keith (m. 1948; div. 1954); Walter C. Wallace (m. 1963)

Frances Helm (October 14, 1923 - December 30, 2006) was an American stage, film, and television actress whose performing career spanned nearly fifty years.

== Early life and education ==
She was born Mary Frances Helm in Panama City, Florida, to Thomas William Helm II and Grace Spencer. Her father started as a bookkeeper for the railroad industry then became an accountant for the state of Virginia, moving the family to Richmond when Helm was very young. She had one older brother. Helm graduated from J. A. C. Chandler Junior High School in June 1937. She graduated from John Marshall High School in Richmond, Virginia, in June 1940.

Beginning at the age of ten, Helm took piano and voice lessons. Later she studied with Mary Barbour Dixon, who would remain her drama teacher and coach all through secondary school and college. Helm attended the Richmond Professional Institute (RPI) from Fall 1940 through Spring 1942, majoring in Speech and Dramatics. Helm was a member of RPI's Theater Associates, which mounted productions at the school using students and the occasional visiting professional actor. Helm and other RPI drama students also did broadcasts of play readings on the school's radio station. While at the school, Helm dropped her first name for stage billing.

During her last term at RPI, her brother returned to Richmond after being wounded at Pearl Harbor. A Radioman 2/C in the USN, Thomas W. Helm had kept firing an antiaircraft gun during the attack despite being severely wounded; the Navy credited him with bringing down a Japanese aircraft. (Note: Navy doctors found 17 shrapnal wounds on Helm and had to amputate three fingers of his left hand. He later became a magazine writer and author of The Sea Lark.) Invalided out of the service in April 1942, he was used for recruiting and bond drives, with his sister accompanying him. She was pictured at Red Cross events and dances with her brother and other servicemen. Frances Helm also joined other volunteer actors to perform a parody of an old-fashioned melodrama, Ten Nights in a Bar-Room, at military bases in Virginia and Maryland.

== Career ==
=== Early stage career ===
After graduating from RPI, Helm moved to New York City, where she took additional drama training at Columbia University while modeling in fashion shows for the Powers Agency. She also worked in radio, both as a voice actress and a personality for variety shows. For one radio show called "Blind Date", hosted by Arlene Francis, Helm was matched with a G.I. for an evening at the Stork Club.

During late 1945 Helm signed up for a theatrical trial by fire, a six-month stint with one of the Clare Tree Major Touring Companies. (Note: These companies performed plays for children at amateur venues across the country. To minimize expenses, the company traveled with only costumes and a few vital hand-held props. All other items for a stage production were to be provided by the sponsoring organization (usually a PTA) at each venue along the way. Sponsor compliance with the pre-production instructions varied from competent to abysmal. An actor really had to be dedicated to the theatre to perform in this setup for months at a time.) She performed in The Golden Apple by Lady Gregory, a short play based on an Irish fairy story.

Come September 1946 Helm joined a more traditional touring company with a revival of Life with Father. Cast as "Mary Skinner", the primary love interest, Helm had a lot of publicity during the tour of the Eastern United States. The tour traveled by a large private bus with an attached trailer for sets and props, enabling it to play small towns without train service. The tour finished up in Texas during early March 1947.

From April thru May 1947 Helm made an independent color film called The Clam-digger's Daughter, which was never distributed to theaters for exhibition. Helm credited the film, shot on location in Cape Charles, Virginia, with restoring her Southern accent.

Living up North has made me lose my accent twice. I got it back the first time by moving in with six Mississippi girls who lived in New York, and the second time by appearing in a "made-in-Virginia" movie.

She performed in summer stock during 1947 at the Green Mountain Playhouse in Middlebury, Vermont. (Note: The playhouse was owned by Raymond Hodges, the head of Dramatics at RPI, and included a number of its alumni (besides Helm) among its players.) From June 1948 Helm appeared in summer stock on Long Island in Parlor Story, which had a short run on Broadway the year before. She then starred in Years Ago, a much more successful recent Broadway comedy.

=== Mister Roberts ===
By August 1948 Helm had joined the national touring company for Mister Roberts, while the original was then in its sixth month on Broadway. Helm was the only female in the large cast, which included her then husband Robert Keith Jr, who was still using his birth name for billing at the time. The play starred Richard Carlson, James Rennie, Murray Hamilton, and Robert Burton, with a young Cliff Robertson. After several weeks in Detroit, the play went to Chicago for a two-week run that turned into twelve months.

While playing Chicago, Helm and other cast members of Mister Roberts put on free plays at veteran's homes in the area. The local newspaper printed photos of Helm with different members of the cast nearly every month, emphasizing her as the only woman in the play. At eleven months into the run the Chicago Tribune published a photo of Helm with her husband in their roles as "Lt. Ann Girard" and "Mannion".

From Chicago the touring company for Mister Roberts moved to Pittsburgh's Nixon Theater in September 1949, with John Forsythe taking over the titular role and Jackie Cooper playing "Ensign Pulver". As with critics in Detroit and Chicago, the Pittsburgh reviewer praised Helm for her delivery while noting the brevity of her part. The tour then went to one and two week runs at smaller cities, finally finishing up with a three-month booking in Boston that ended in April 1950. Helm was so reliable in playing every show that the tour finally dispensed with having an understudy for her three minutes on stage.

=== Early television ===
Helm's first television appearance was for a program called Hollywood Screen Test during October 1950. She did an episode of The Philco Television Playhouse in May 1951 followed by an episode of Kraft Television Theatre in November. All of these programs were originally broadcast live from New York City, though the latter program was apparently recorded by kinescope and re-broadcast to the West Coast the following month.

The following year she guest starred in episodes of Adventures of Ellery Queen and The Web, both thirty minute live broadcasts. The latter was also recorded by kinescope and re-broadcast in March 1952. Her third program in as many months was for Armstrong Circle Theater, another New York live broadcast. She did another The Web episode in March 1952, her first TV work alongside her then husband.

Her 1952 performing year having been front-loaded with TV work during the first quarter, Helm did four weekly summer stock plays in Bangor, Maine during June, then one more Television Playhouse episode in November.

She had little performing work in 1953: an uncredited bit part in Never Wave at a WAC, followed by a highly praised week playing "Stella Kowalski" in a stage production of A Streetcar Named Desire, another television episode, then four weeks reprising her roles in Detective Story and Mister Roberts.

=== Valiant Lady ===
During 1954 Helm toured with Joe E. Brown from July through October in The Show-Off. Discovering in December 1954 that she had been secretly divorced by her husband five months earlier, Helm was forced to take whatever performing work she could find. Since she was still maintaining residency in New York, Helm took on a soap opera role, as "Linda Kendall" in Valiant Lady. This fifteen minute television program was broadcast live daily from CBS studios in Manhattan. Helm played a woman with mental issues, which years later her mother said was the hardest role to watch her daughter perform.

Helm's exact tenure on the show is difficult to verify. Credited with 246 episodes during calendar year 1955, the only reliable reference date is a newspaper photo from July 17, 1955, showing her, Sue Randall, and Flora Campbell wearing shorts in Central Park while being rehearsed by director Herb Kenwith. It was certainly over by early November 1955, when Helm did a series of plays at the Paper Mill Playhouse for producer Frank Carrington and an episode of Robert Montgomery Presents. Whatever the dates were, it was Helm's longest recurring television role, and a measure of her determination to remain on the East Coast so long as it was professionally possible.

== Coastal commuter ==
=== 1956-1958 ===
By 1956, the great majority of television work was in Southern California, and Helm would have to commute between the coasts. She made an episode of Matinee Theater in April 1956 that producer Aubrey Schenck saw; he cast her in the film Revolt at Fort Laramie as a result. After two more episodes of Matinee Theater, she returned to New York to take over Bethel Leslie's role of "Rachel Brown" in the original Broadway production of Inherit the Wind. Helm joined the production in November 1956 and remained with it until its closing in June 1957.

The remainder of 1957 saw her doing two minor plays. Career was already an off-Broadway success when Helm joined it for a week in Philadelphia. One Foot in the Door, with June Havoc and David White, had its premiere with a ten-day tryout in Philadelphia followed by one week in Boston. Critics in both cities panned it.

With the flop of One Foot in the Door, Helm had to return to the West Coast for more television in late spring 1958. She did three episodes of two different series, but returned to New York later that year for two episodes of a new show called New York Confidential. This show was mainly filmed in New York, but one episode Helm did was made in Jacksonville, Florida.

=== 1959-1960 ===
She spent late spring and summer of 1959 in a center staged road company production of Look Homeward, Angel, playing engagements in Miami, Philadelphia, and San Diego. While on the West Coast, she filmed an episode of The Millionaire.

Helm returned to the East Coast for trial runs of The Deadly Game, an adaption of A Dangerous Game, during January 1960. After the short tryouts, the play moved to Broadway but lasted only 39 performances from February thru March 1960. As with Mister Roberts, Helm was the only woman in the cast, and appeared only briefly on stage in the final scene. She took advantage of this situation to see the opening acts of other plays then performing on Broadway, telling a columnist "I'm waiting for the book versions so I can see how these plays end".

=== 1961-1963 ===
In 1961, Helm did episodes of six television shows, five of them on the West Coast and one in New York. Early 1962 saw her do two episodes of Everglades! on location in her native Florida.

She then took the female lead in the West Coast premiere of Critic's Choice, which opened mid-May 1962 in Los Angeles. Meant for a short run, the production was a hit, running so long the original leading man Edward Binns had to be replaced by Ted Knight due to prior performing commitments. As a contrast, a columnist mentioned that while performing the play at nights, Helm went to the Warner Brothers Studio to make an episode of 77 Sunset Strip during the day. During its tenth week the production was converted from front staging to center staging; it closed two weeks later.

Helm also took part in filming The Ugly American in 1962, playing secretary to Marlon Brando's ambassador.

Later that year, Helm temporarily took over the role of "Nancy Pollock" on The Edge of Night when actress Ann Flood took three months maternity leave.

In February 1963 Helm reprised her role in Critic's Choice with Hans Conried for a one-week run in Louisville, Kentucky. A month later she married for the second time.

== Later career ==
After the birth of her daughter in late spring 1964, Helm resumed working in October of that year. She temporarily took on the role of "Susan Dunbar" on The Secret Storm, replacing Mary Foskett, who had moved to the West Coast. The show, like many soaps, was still made in New York City at the time. Judy Lewis took over the character on January 7, 1965.

Helm would let a couple of years go by between performing engagements for the rest of her career. She did two TV episodes in 1967, and a set of playlets in 1969, before resuming a fuller schedule in 1972. That year saw her join a touring company for the summer season, playing a small role in Remember Me, a comedy by Ronald Alexander. She then had a starring role in Welcome Home, playing opposite Pernell Roberts, in an original play by Edmund Hartmann. The production ran three weeks at Chicago's Ivanhoe Theater.

During 1976 Helm did an episode of Kojak then she and Danny Aiello starred in a Broadway flop called Wheelbarrow Closers, which lasted for only 7 previews and 8 performances. She had a smaller role in the original production of Manny in 1979, which lasted for about a month on Broadway. She had better luck with Broadway revivals, albeit in understudy positions, for Morning's at Seven in 1980-81 and You Can't Take It With You in 1983–84.

As her stage career wound down, Helm continued doing screen work, making an episode of an obscure TV series and the film A Little Sex in 1982. She did two more films, a bit part in Shakedown (1988) and larger role in Electric Moon (1992). Her final performing work was for a TV movie, Love and Betrayal: The Mia Farrow Story in 1995.

== Personal life ==
Helm married Robert Alba Keith on January 3, 1948, in Richmond. They were in Mister Roberts for eighteen months, did at least one television episode together, but separated on July 28, 1953. On December 8, 1954, Helm charged Keith with "introducing another woman as his wife", without naming her. Newspapers reported in January 1955 that Keith had already obtained a Mexican divorce six months earlier and remarried to dancer Judy Landon. At a settlement hearing, Helm agreed to accept the divorce and receive $250 monthly alimony from Keith. However, a few weeks later the alimony was set aside on a "quirk" of California law wherein only the party filing for divorce could claim alimony.

In April 1963 Helm married Walter C. Wallace, a former assistant Secretary of Labor in the Eisenhower administration. He was the personnel director for a New York paper company. The couple had one child, a daughter Laura Wallace, born in late spring 1964. They remained married until Helm's death in 2006.

According to her obituary in Variety, Helm was a long-time member of The Player's Club and had served on its board of directors.

== Stage performances ==
Listed by year of first performance (excluding student productions)
Year	Play	Role	Venue	Notes
1946	The Golden Apple	Princess of Spain	Clare Tree Major Touring Company	Helm did a six-month run with this Irish fairy story by Lady Gregory
1946	Life with Father	Mary Skinner	Touring Company	Another six-month run for Helm finished up in early March 1947
1947	The Curtain Rises	Elsa Karling	Green Mountain Playhouse	This was a 1933 Broadway comedy, not the 1938 French Crime film.
1948	Parlor Story		Old Town Theatre (Note: This was a venue in Smithtown, Long Island)	Helm co-starred with Neil Hamilton and Peggy French
1948	Years Ago	Ruth Gordon Jones	Old Town Theatre	Helm starred in this Ruth Gordon autobiographical play.
1948	Mister Roberts	Lt. Ann Girard	Cass Theatre (1948) (Note: This venue was located in Detroit); Erlanger Theatre (1948–49) (Note: This venue was located in Chicago); Nixon Theater (1949); Colonial Theatre	Two weeks in Detroit were followed by 54 weeks in Chicago, three weeks in Pittsburgh, one week stands in smaller towns then 12 weeks in Boston
1950	The Shadow of a Gunman	Minnie Powell	Old Town Theatre	Helm plays an unfortunate would-be Irish patriot in this tragicomedy
1951	The Royal Family		Casino Theatre (Note: This venue was in Newport, Rhode Island)	
1951	Detective Story	Mary McLeod	Brighton Theatre (Note: This venue was an off-Broadway house in New York City, part of what was called the "Subway Circuit")	Edward Binns starred with Helm as his wife
1952	My Only Love		Lakewood Players (Note: Their venue was in Bangor, Maine)	Weeklong summer stock run for this comedy of identities
1952	Apron Strings		Lakewood Players	Another weekly summer stock run for Helm
1952	Lo and Behold	Daisy Durdie	Lakewood Players	Helm is reduced to playing a housekeeper
1952	Ramshackle Inn		Lakewood Players	Zazu Pitts was the star of this farce
1953	A Streetcar Named Desire	Stella Kowalski	Mountain Playhouse	Helm co-starred with Lee Sanders, Joel Thomas, and Robert Drew
1953	Detective Story	Mary McLeod	Empress Playhouse (Note: This venue was located in St. Louis, Missouri)	Helm reprised her role with Robert Alda as her husband
1953	Mister Roberts	Lt. Ann Girard	Empress Playhouse	Another reprise, with Wayne Morris and Robert Shawley
1954	The Show-Off	Amy	Touring Company	Joe E. Brown starred with Helm as his young wife
1955	I Killed the Count	Polly	Paper Mill Playhouse	Helm appeared with Ian Keith and Alexander Clarke
1955	Harvey		Paper Mill Playhouse	Joe E. Brown was the star
1956	Inherit the Wind	Rachel Brown	National Theatre	Helm's first Broadway role lasted seven months
1957	Career		Playhouse in the Park (Note: This was located in Philadelphia's Fairmount Park)	One week run with Charles Aidman, Alfred Ryder and Constance Ford
1957	One Foot in the Door	Dorann	Locust Street Theatre; Schubert Theatre	New play was called flat in Philly and a turkey in Beantown
1959	Look Homeward, Angel	Laura James	Coconut Grove Playhouse; Playhouse in the Park; La Jolla Playhouse	Miriam Hopkins, Ed Begley, and Andrew Prine starred
1960	The Deadly Game	A Visitor	Schubert Theatre; Ford's Theatre (Note: This was located in Baltimore); Longacre Theatre	Max Adrian, Claude Dauphin, and Pat Hingle starred
1962	Critic's Choice	Angela Ballantine	Player's Ring Theatre (Note: This theatre was located on Santa Monica Blvd in Hollywood)	Helm originally starred with Edward Binns, later Ted Knight
1963	Critic's Choice	Angela Ballantine	Brown Theatre	Hans Conried and Helm did a one-week run
1969	Pets	Lesbian Painter/Redhead	Provincetown Playhouse	Helm was in two of three dismal one act playlets by Richard Reich
1972	Remember Me	Grace White	Lakewood Players; Westport Country Playhouse; Pocono Playhouse	Robert Stack, Eileen Heckart, and Marian Seldes star in play by Ronald Alexander
1972	Welcome Home	Mother/Son's Wife	Ivanhoe Theatre	Pernell Roberts and Helm starred in comedy by Edmund Hartmann
1976	Wheelbarrow Closers	Beatrice Grant	Bijou Theatre	Helm and Danny Aiello starred in original comedy during October on Broadway
1979	Manny	Gladys	Century Theatre	Raymond Serra starred; it had 5 previews and 31 performances on Broadway during April–May
1980	Morning's at Seven	Understudy: Esther Crampton	Lyceum Theatre	Highly successful revival; Helm was replacement understudy for Maureen O'Sullivan
1983	You Can't Take It With You	Understudy	Plymouth Theatre	Helm was understudy for four female roles during the 312 performances of this revival

== Filmography ==
Film (by year of first release)
Year	Title	Role	Notes
1947	The Clam-digger's Daughter (Note: When the film turned up in London in 1988 the British National Film Archive called it The Story of Mr. Hobbs.)	Timmy Hobbs	Independent color production filmed in Cape Charles, Virginia never had any theatrical distribution
1950	Trader Thorne	Charlotte	A short film likely commissioned by the Ford Motor Company as a motivator for salesmen
1953	Never Wave at a WAC	Lt. Green	Uncredited minor role
1957	Revolt at Fort Laramie	Melissa Bradner	Helm had second billing after John Dehner
1963	The Ugly American	TadRed, Ambassador's Secretary	Filmed in 1962, Helm played Marlon Brando's secretary
1982	A Little Sex	Ellie Donovan	
1988	Shakedown	Guest	
1992	Electric Moon	Emma Lane	

Television (in original broadcast order)
Year	Series	Episode	Role	Notes
1950	Hollywood Screen Test	(1950-10-16)	Herself	Helm and Margaret Garland were the guests for this day's episode
1951	The Philco Television Playhouse	The Visitor		Adapted by Kenneth White from original play by Carl Randau and Leane Zugsmith
1951	Kraft Television Theatre	The Fair-Haired Boy		Helm co-starred with Dick Foran, Richard Carlyle, and Nelson Olmsted
1952	Adventures of Ellery Queen	Death in the Sorority House		Lee Bowman played Ellery Queen
1952	The Web	Friends of the Devil		Helm starred with Henry Beckman, Paul Ford, and Edgar Stehli
1952	Armstrong Circle Theatre	The Man in 308	Nurse Casey	Helm starred with Leslie Nielsen, Grace Valentine, Janet Fox, and Michael Howard
1952	The Web	Nemesis	Girl Reporter	Edmon Ryan, Robert Keith Jr, and Edwin Jerome star with Helm
1952	Television Playhouse	The Old Beginning		James Broderick starred with Helm, J.S. Dudley, and Carmen Mathews
1953	Ford Theatre	Tomorrow's Men	Judy Essex	John Derek, Pat O'Brien, and Ann Doran starred with Helm
1954	Fireside Theatre	The Farnsworth Case		
1954	The Secret Storm	Unknown episodes		Helm had an unknown role on this show's first year
1955	Valiant Lady	246 Episodes	Linda Kendall	
1955	Robert Montgomery Presents	Lucifer	Gina Keyes	
1956	Matinee Theater	One of the Family	Olivia Dunne	
1956	Matinee Theater	The Catamaran	(Young wife)	Mary Astor starred with Helm and Patrick O'Neal
1956	Matinee Theater	Sound of Fear		Helm starred with Jerry Paris, Helen Wallis, and Lewis Martin
1958	Perry Mason	The Case of the Lazy Lover	Bernice Archer	
1958	Mike Hammer	A Detective Tail	Ann Cooper Tilton	
1958	Perry Mason	The Case of the Married Moonlighter	Linda Kennedy	
1959	New York Confidential	Come Home to Death	Helen	
1959	New York Confidential	Crosseyed Camera	Professor	
1959	The Millionaire	The Doctor John Frye Story	Nurse Julia Frye	
1960	Perry Mason	The Case of the Nine Dolls	Helene Osborne	Her third and last episode, all as hostile witnesses
1961	True Story	Friends Before Freud	Dr. Leslie Barrett	Helm is an analyst whose patient (Bill Hayes) falls in love with her
1961	The Deputy	Spoken in Silence	Laura Rogers	US Marshall (Henry Fonda) is aided by deaf-mute lady (Helm)
1961	The New Breed	Death of a Ghost	Lois McHenry	Helm plays a hit and run victim
1961	Gunsmoke	All That	Clara	
1961	Surfside 6	The Old School Tie	Helen Todd	
1961	Hazel	Dorothy's Obsession	Peggy Baldwin	
1962	Everglades!	The Hostage	Susanna Duncan	
1962	Everglades!	Fatal Information	Dorothea Swan	
1962	77 Sunset Strip	The Raiders	Janet Lovell	Helm played the wife of a senator (Lee Bowman)
1962	The Edge of Night	(~65 episodes)	Nancy Pollock	Helm temporarily replaced Ann Flood while latter was on maternity leave
1964	Route 66	Like This It Means Father	Edith Wilcox	
1964	The Secret Storm	(~65 episodes)	Susan Dunbar	This was Helm's second role on the series
1967	Dark Shadows	2 episodes	Nurse	Episodes of May 19 and May 22
1976	Kojak	Birthday Party	Travel Agent	
1982	One of the Boys	Double Date	Grace Morrison	
1995	Love and Betrayal: The Mia Farrow Story	(TV Movie)	Maureen O'Sullivan	Broadcast as two 2-hour segments; Helm was well-acquainted with Maureen O'Sullivan
