= You Deserve a Tech Union =

2023 book by Ethan Marcotte

- Author: Ethan Marcotte
- Language: English
- Subject: technology, unions in the united states
- Publisher: A Book Apart
- Publication date: 2023
- Publication place: United States
- Pages: 150
- ISBN: 9798991542005

You Deserve a Tech Union is a 2023 nonfiction book by Ethan Marcotte. The book encourages technology workers to form unions. The book addresses the significant technology layoffs that began happening in 2022 and encouraged collective organizing as a method for technology workers to not only get better working conditions but also to advocate for more social responsibility within technology. The book offers a big tent approach to who is considered a technology worker including jobs such as content moderation and not just programmers. The topics covered include who gets to be in the union, how unions help deal with AI questions, issues surrounding union busting, and touches on some arguments against unions.

Nozlee Samadzadeh from the New York Times Tech Guild calls it "a history lesson, and a manifesto all in one." Peter Olney from Labor Notes said that the book offers "clear advice on organizing, as well as some captivating history of technology." The book was re-released as a self-published title in 2025 after Marcotte reacquired the rights to the book following the closure of his publisher, A Book Apart.
