= Zugsmith =

Zugsmith is a surname. Notable people with the surname include:

- Albert Zugsmith (1910–1993), American film producer, film director, and screenwriter
- Leane Zugsmith (1903–1969), American writer
