= Times-Union =

Times-Union or Times Union may refer to:

== Newspapers ==
Each in the United States

- Times Union (Albany, New York), Albany, New York (under this name since 1891)
- Brooklyn Times-Union, Brooklyn, New York (1932–1937 under this name)
- The Florida Times-Union, Jacksonville, Florida (under that name since 1883)
- Rochester Times-Union, Rochester, New York (1918–1997 under this name)
- Warsaw Times-Union, Warsaw, Indiana (1854–present)

== Buildings ==
- Times Union Center, an indoor arena in Albany, New York, U.S.
- Times-Union Center for the Performing Arts, in Jacksonville, Florida, U.S.

== Other ==
- New York Times Guild, the trade union of workers at The New York Times
