= Valiant Lady =

American soap opera television series

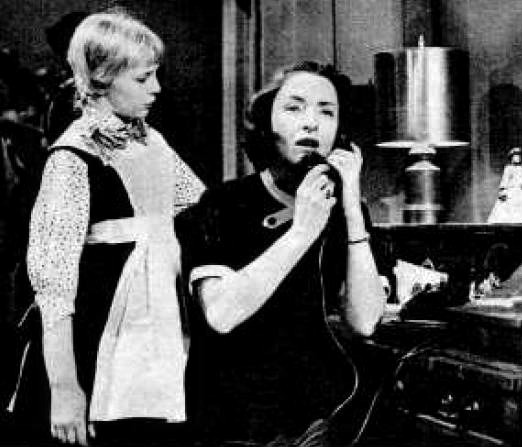
- Bonnie Sawyer as Kim Emerson and Flora Campbell as Helen Emerson, 1956.
- Genre: Soap opera
- Created by: Adrian Spies
- Written by: Charles Elwyn
- Starring: Nancy Coleman; Flora Campbell
- Country of origin: United States
- No. of seasons: 5
- No. of episodes: 1,024

Production
- Production locations: CBS Studios; New York, New York
- Running time: 15 minutes

Original release
- Network: CBS
- Release: October 12, 1953 – August 16, 1957

Valiant Lady is an American soap opera which ran daily on CBS radio and television from October 12, 1953, to August 16, 1957. The show's title was taken from a 1930s radio soap opera about a young woman struggling through life but is otherwise very different. Like many early soap operas, the show was broadcast live from CBS Studio 57 in Manhattan.

The series was created by Adrian Spies; the head writer was Charles Elwyn.

== Storyline ==
Helen Emerson, the focus of the show, was a forty-ish matron whose husband died in the show's first year. Because of her widowhood, she endured financial hardship while continually worrying about her three children's lives. Headstrong son Mickey fell for a divorcee, impulsive daughter Diane ran off with a married man, and bratty Kim constantly implored Helen to teach her the latest dance step. Helen's biggest romance throughout the series was with Hal Soames, a married airline pilot in the midst of a divorce. She finally found peace and happiness in the show's final year, when she married Governor Lawrence Walker.

== Cast ==
During the run of the show, two actresses played Helen Emerson, and two played daughter Kim. Son Mickey was played throughout by James Kirkwood Jr., the 1970s/1980's novelist and playwright best known for A Chorus Line. Kirkwood would learn his lines while driving into work with director John Desmond. Though the wife of the airline pilot was played by four different actresses (one of whom, Sue Randall, became best known as Theodore Cleaver's teacher Miss Landers in the TV series Leave It to Beaver), the airline pilot himself, Hal Soames, was played by only one actor throughout, Earl Hammond, who later became well known as the deep bass voice of many television cartoon heroes and villains in the 1980s. Helen's husband, on the series for only the first year, was played by Jerome Cowan, best known for playing Miles Archer, the private eye partner of Humphrey Bogart's Sam Spade in The Maltese Falcon.

Martin Balsam appeared late in the series as an undesirable boyfriend of daughter Kim who ends up saving the lives of the entire family during a hostage situation. A minor character was played by Helen Wagner, who, later on As the World Turns, played Nancy Hughes, the longest-running character on any television soap opera.

- Nancy Coleman — Helen Emerson #1 (1953–1954; original cast)
- Flora Campbell — Helen Emerson #2 (1954–1957)
- Anne Pearson — Diane Emerson Soames #1 (1953–1954; original cast)
- Dolores Sutton — Diane Emerson Soames #2 (1954–1955)
- Sue Randall — Diane Emerson Soames #3 (1955–1956)
- Lelia Martin — Diane Emerson Soames #4 (1956–1957)
- Helen Wagner — Jane Lyman (1953–1954)
- Jerome Cowan — Frank Emerson (1953–1957)
- James Kirkwood Jr. — Mickey Emerson (1953–1957)
- Lydia Reed — Kim Emerson #1 (1953–1954)
- Bonnie Sawyer — Kim Emerson #2 (1954–1957)
- Joan Lorring — Bonnie Withers #1 (1954–1955)
- Shirley Egleston — Bonnie Withers #2 (1955)
- Earl Hammond — Hal Soames (1954–1955)
- Margaret Hamilton — Mrs. Sayre (1955)
- Frances Helm — Linda Kendall (1955)
- Terry O'Sullivan — Elliott Norris (1955)
- Larry Weber — Capt. Chris Kendall (1954–1955)
- Martin Balsam — Joey Gordon (1955)
- Katherine Squire — Gertrude Harper (1956–1957)
- Betty Oakes — Roberta Wilcox (1956–1957)
- John Graham — Gov. Lawrence Walker (1956–1957)
- Doro Merande — Ivy Harper (1956–1957)
- Lilia Skala — Mme. Garstel (1957)
- Joan Tompkins — Marion Walker (1957)
- Abby Lewis — ? (?)

Writers included Charles Elwyn, Charles Spies, and Robert J. Shaw. It was directed by Herb Kenwith and produced by Leonard Blair.

== Ratings ==
In the Nielsen ratings for daytime soaps in the United States, Valiant Lady never did better than 4th in its first two seasons (around 10.5%) where it had no competition its first season and then went against the Tennessee Ernie Ford Show starting in early 1955. Though dropping to 6th (9.2%) in its third season, the show held its own against the competition. In the 1956/1957 season, the wildly popular Tic Tac Dough was new competition and Valiant Lady dropped to 9th (7.0%). The #1 & #2 soap operas during these years were Search for Tomorrow and The Guiding Light with Search for Tomorrow averaging 14.2% and The Guiding Light averaging 12.9%.
