= Revolt at Fort Laramie =

1957 film

- Theatrical film poster
- Directed by: Lesley Selander
- Written by: Robert C. Dennis
- Produced by: Howard W. Koch; Aubrey Schenck
- Starring: John Dehner; Gregg Palmer; Frances Helm; Don Gordon
- Cinematography: William Margulies
- Edited by: John F. Schreyer
- Music by: Les Baxter
- Production company: Bel-Air Productions
- Distributed by: United Artists
- Release date: March 1957
- Running time: 73 minutes
- Country: United States
- Language: English

Revolt at Fort Laramie is a 1957 American Color by Deluxe Western film directed by Lesley Selander and starring John Dehner, Gregg Palmer, Frances Helm and Don Gordon. The film was shot in Kanab, Utah with Harry Dean Stanton making his debut in the film.

== Plot ==
In 1861, the undermanned garrison of Fort Laramie, Wyoming Territory attempts to keep the peace with the Sioux Nation led by Chief Red Cloud. As part the Treaty with the Indians, the United States government pays Red Cloud in gold to keep the peace and support his people. However Red Cloud comes up with the idea of stealing the gold and using the resulting non-payment as an excuse to go to war.

Meanwhile, as the United States faces events that lead to the American Civil War, the garrison of the fort is split in their sympathies. A third of the men, led by Sgt Darrach, support the Confederate States of America. The rest, led by Sgt Serrell, support the Union. When the garrison hears about the Battle of Fort Sumter, the Confederate faction not only wants to leave the army, but take the gold shipment due to be paid to Red Cloud to Texas.

One of the Southerners warns Capt. Tenslip and Lt. Waller on the Southerner's plan to mutiny, for which he is murdered for betraying the cause with his screams covered by the men singing Dixie. Tenslip is worried that his commander, Major Bradner, a Virginian, may side with the South. Bradner sends Tenslip to get the latest gold shipment with a mix of Southern and Northern troops, and Tenslip worries the Southern troops will try to steal it. They are attacked by Red Cloud but manage to get the gold back to the fort, where Bradner puts it into his safe.

The next day Major Bradner receives word that any soldier with Southern sympathies may leave the service with an honorable discharge and go home to fight for the Confederacy. Bradner resigns his commission and turns command of the fort over to Tenslip. He and the other Southern soldiers leave, dressed in civilian clothes. Red Cloud attacks them, refusing to believe they are no longer soldiers. He surrounds them and is on the brink of killing them all. Word of their situation gets back to the fort. Tenslip and a group of volunteers go to their aid. They succeed in driving Red Cloud away, but Bradner is killed in the battle. The surviving Southern loyalists continue on their journey home, while Tenslip leads his troops back to the fort.

== Cast ==
- John Dehner as Maj. Seth Bradner
- Gregg Palmer as Capt. James 'Jamie' Tenslip
- Frances Helm as Melissa Bradner
- Don Gordon as Jean Salignac
- Kenne Duncan as Capt. Foley
- Robert Knapp as 1st. Lt. Chick Waller
- Robert Keys as Sgt. Darrach
- Bill Barker as Cpl. Hendrey
- Clay Randolph as Cpl. Caswell
- William 'Bill' Phillips as Serrell (as Wm. "Bill' Phillips)
- Sterling Franck as Ezra (as Cain Mason)
- Fritz Ford as Frederick Ford
- Eddie Little Sky as Red Cloud (as Eddie Little)
- Harry Dean Stanton as Rinty (uncredited)

== Production ==
Parts of the film were shot at the Kanab movie fort and Kanab Creek in Utah.

== Notable quotes ==
"The bitterest choice of all; to break your oath or your heart"—Major Seth Bradner

== Soundtrack ==
Two well known and historical songs are included in the soundtrack of film:

- John Brown's Body

Lyrics: James E. Greenleaf, C. S. Hall, C. B. Marsh, and others, 1861
Music: American folk song, 1856

- Dixie

Lyrics and music: Daniel Decatur Emmett

== See also ==
- List of American films of 1957
