= The Aquanauts =

Television series

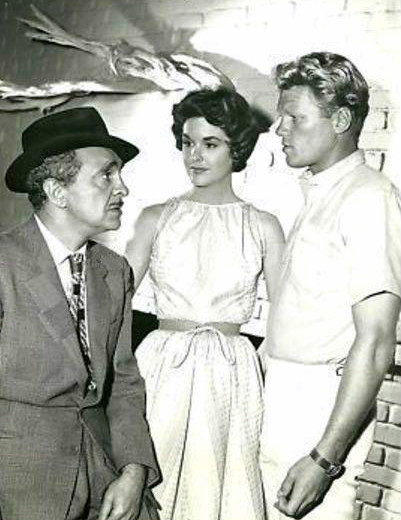
- Scene from the episode "Night Dive". From left: Sam Levene, Sue Randall, and Jeremy Slate (1960)
- Also known as: Malibu Run
- Genre: Adventure/Drama
- Written by: E.M. Parsons
- Directed by: William Conrad; Fred Hamilton; Jack Herzberg; Herman Hoffman; Andrew Marton
- Starring: Keith Larsen; Jeremy Slate; Ron Ely
- Country of origin: United States
- Original language: English
- No. of seasons: 1
- No. of episodes: 32

Production
- Executive producer: Ivan Tors
- Producers: Fred Hamilton; Ivan Tors
- Running time: 60 minutes
- Production company: Ziv-United Artists

Original release
- Network: CBS
- Release: September 14, 1960 – June 7, 1961

Related
- Sea Hunt

The Aquanauts (later known as Malibu Run) is an American adventure/drama series that aired on CBS September 14, 1960 - February 22, 1961 (or September 14, 1960 - September 27, 1961). The series stars Keith Larsen, Jeremy Slate and Ron Ely, who replaced Larsen on midseason.

== Synopsis ==
The hour-long series focuses on the adventures of two Southern California divers, Drake Andrews (Larsen) and Larry Lahr (Slate), who made their living salvaging sunken wrecks. In January 1961, Larsen left the series due to health problems. His character rejoined the Navy and a new character, Mike Madison (Ron Ely), replaced him. A month later, the format of the series was also changed with the show's characters, Larry and Mike, opening up a dive shop in Malibu Beach. While still engaged in dangerous underwater salvage dives, the partners' youthful lifestyle and romantic encounters were given more emphasis. To reflect the changes in the format, the series was retitled Malibu Run, with a lively theme performed by pianist André Previn.

The program was broadcast on Wednesdays from 7:30 to 8:30 p.m. Eastern Time in competition with the short-lived Hong Kong on ABC and NBC's Wagon Train. Unable to compete with the latter show, the series was canceled after one season.

== Cast ==
- Keith Larsen as Drake Andrews
- Jeremy Slate as Larry Lahr (1960)
- Ron Ely as Mike Madison (1961)
- Charles Thompson as The Captain (1961)

=== Notable guest stars ===
Dyan Cannon, Russ Conway, Donna Douglas, Peter Falk, Robert Knapp, Sam Levene, Audrey Meadows, Carroll O'Connor, Susan Oliver, Burt Reynolds, Sue Randall, Madame Spivy, Inger Stevens, Jane Withers, Keenan Wynn, James Coburn, Jim Davis, Larry Pennell and Ken Curtis, these two last actors, later of Ripcord fame. In the episode "The Double Adventure" Rue McClanahan makes a small appearance as a waitress in a diner.

== Production notes ==
Produced by Ivan Tors for Ziv-United Artists and the rights to this series are currently held by MGM Television.

Despite its short run, The Aquanauts was popular with the programmers at Buffalo TV station WNYP-TV, who at one point aired the series every day at the same time. Unfortunately, the station inadvertently played the same episode every day for two weeks until someone noticed.

== Episodes ==
Episode #	Episode title	Original airdate
1-1	"The Aquanauts: Paradivers"	September 14, 1960
1-2	"The Aquanauts: Collision"	September 21, 1960
1-3	"The Aquanauts: Rendezvous: 22 Fathoms"	September 28, 1960
1-4	"The Aquanauts: Safecracker"	October 5, 1960
1-5	"The Aquanauts: Deep Escape"	October 12, 1960
1-6	"The Aquanauts: The Stowaway"	October 19, 1960
1-7	"The Aquanauts: Disaster Below"	October 26, 1960
1-8	"The Aquanauts: Arms of Venus"	November 9, 1960
1-9	"The Aquanauts: Night Dive"	November 16, 1960
1-10	"The Aquanauts: The Cavedivers"	December 7, 1960
1-11	"The Aquanauts: The Big Swim"	December 14, 1960
1-12	"The Aquanauts: Underwater Demolition"	December 21, 1960
1-13	"The Aquanauts: River Gold"	January 4, 1961
1-14	"The Aquanauts: Niagara Dive"	January 11, 1961
1-15	"The Aquanauts: Killers In Paradise"	January 25, 1961
1-16	"The Aquanauts: Secret At Half Moon Key"	February 1, 1961
1-17	"The Aquanauts: Stormy Weather"	February 8, 1961
1-18	"The Aquanauts: The Amored Truck Adventure"	February 15, 1961
1-19	"The Aquanauts: The Defective Tank Adventure"	February 22, 1961
1-20	"Malibu Run: The Jeremiah Adventure"	March 1, 1961
1-21	"Malibu Run: Tidal Wave Adventure"	March 8, 1961
1-22	"Malibu Run: The Radioactive Object Adventure"	March 22, 1961
1-23	"Malibu Run: The Double Adventure"	March 29, 1961
1-24	"Malibu Run: The Margot Adventure"	April 5, 1961
1-25	"Malibu Run: The Rainbow Adventure"	April 19, 1961
1-26	"Malibu Run: The Frankie Adventure"	April 26, 1961
1-27	"Malibu Run: The Guilty Adventure"	May 3, 1961
1-28	"Malibu Run: The Landslide Adventure"	May 10, 1961
1-29	"Malibu Run: The Kidnap Adventure"	May 17, 1961
1-30	"Malibu Run: The Stakeout Adventure"	May 24, 1961
1-31	"Malibu Run: The Scavenger Adventure"	May 31, 1961
1-32	"Malibu Run: The Diana Adventure"	June 7, 1961

== Merchandising ==
The TV show was also adapted into a comic book by Dan Spiegle, distributed by Dell Comics as part of their 4-Color series #1197.

A paperback novel was published dated February 1961 by Popular Library titled The Aquanauts by Daniel Bard and featuring Keith Larsen's character Drake Andrews. It is listed on the cover as Popular Giant G516 with a cost of 35 cents.

== See also ==
- Aquanauts — 1979 Soviet sci-fi movie
