= Gloria Pall =

American actress (1927–2012)

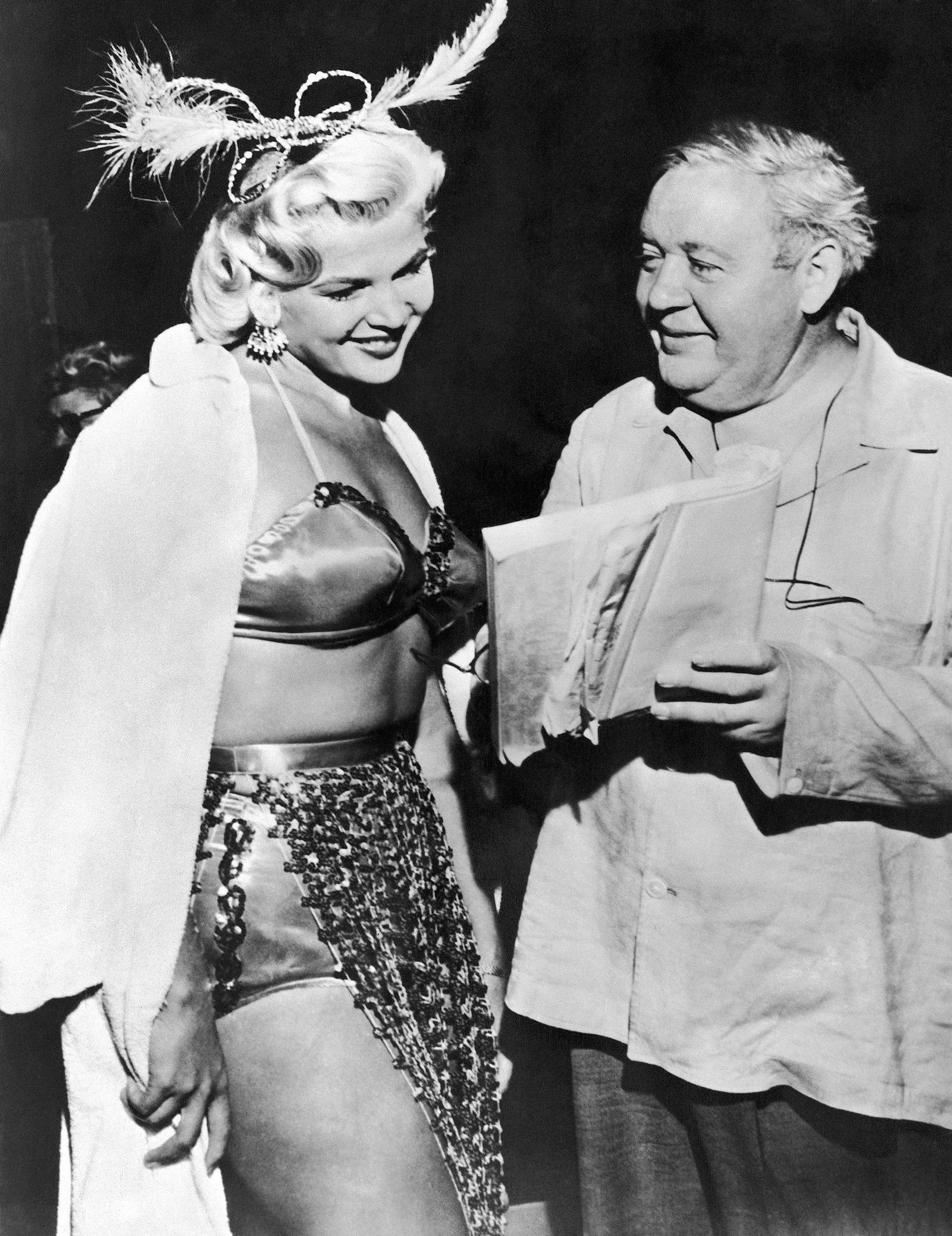
- With director Charles Laughton on the set of The Night of the Hunter, 1954
- Born: Gloria Pallatz; July 15, 1927; Brooklyn, New York, U.S.
- Died: December 30, 2012 (aged 85); Burbank, California, U.S.
- Occupations: Actress; model; showgirl
- Years active: 1947–1964
- Spouse(s): Robert P. Eaton (1956-1957; divorced); Allen Kane (1965-1984; divorced)
- Children: 1

Gloria Pall (born Gloria Pallatz; July 15, 1927 – December 30, 2012) was an American model, showgirl, actress, author, and businesswoman.

== Biography ==
Gloria Pallatz was born in Brooklyn, New York, in 1927. She attended the Casey Jones School of Aeronautics to learn to be an aircraft mechanic and work on war planes. During World War II, she worked as an aircraft mechanic in upstate New York at the Rome Army Air Depot. On July 28, 1945, she was employed by the USO headquarters office on the 56th floor of the Empire State Building in New York City when a U.S. Army B-25 Mitchell bomber crashed into the 79th floor. Fourteen people were killed; she narrowly escaped.

In 1947, she entered and won a "Miss Flatbush" contest which opened the door to work as a model. She worked as a showgirl in both Reno and Las Vegas, as well as in Hollywood, where for a time she was chosen to be "Miss Earl Carroll" from the huge cast of beauties. This was at the Earl Carroll Theatre on Sunset Blvd. in 1952. She dated Howard Hughes for a time.

Pall got her first acting job on television in 1951 and went on to a successful career as an actress for 10 years, primarily in secondary and minor roles. In 1958, she was cast as Blanche Golden in "Abracadabra" of the western aviation adventure series, Sky King. She had a small role in The Twilight Zone episode, "And When the Sky Was Opened". She had small roles in feature films such as Ma and Pa Kettle on Vacation (1953), Abbott and Costello Go to Mars (1953), The French Line (1954), 20,000 Leagues Under the Sea (1954), The Night of the Hunter (1955), Jailhouse Rock (1957), The Brothers Karamazov (1958), The Crimson Kimono (1959), and Elmer Gantry (1960).

She appeared on the cover of several national celebrity magazines and twice was a centerfold in Esquire.

In late 1954 and early 1955, she developed a television show called Voluptua for KABC-TV that caused a furor for what was then seen as obscenity. In a 2011 radio interview with author and broadcaster R. H. Greene, Pall reminisced about the Voluptua program, explaining the show's format, re-enacting character dialogue, and explaining how Christian and PTA groups labelled the character "Corruptua" and pressured KABC to take her off the air. Cancelled after seven weeks, Voluptua got Pall feature stories in Life and Playboy magazines. In 1959, Pall began developing a career in real estate, and in 1962 opened her own office on Sunset Strip. Her final known screen credit is the 1964 TV short Low Man on a Totem Pole.

== Later years ==
In later years, Pall continued her real-estate career and occasionally made public appearances at autograph shows and special events in the Los Angeles area. She made documentary interviews from time to time, about her life and career. According to her Los Angeles Times obituary, Pall dressed frequently in shades of purple and drove a Ford Thunderbird of that color. A sign outside her lavender-colored real-estate office read: "Call Pall."

She also turned to writing books about filmmaking in Hollywood, as well as her autobiography.

== Personal life ==
On August 11, 1956, she wed actor Robert P. Eaton on a whim. They divorced a year later due to his infidelity. She married Allen Kane in 1965; they divorced on August 28, 1984. By her second marriage, she had her only child, her son, Jefferson Kane.

Pall died in Burbank, California, on December 30, 2012, aged 85, from heart failure. A memorial service was held on January 20, 2013. Her sole immediate survivor was her son.

== Publications ==
- Voluptua: Story of a TV Love Goddess (1992)
- Cameo Girl of the '50s (1993)
- I Danced Before the King (2000)
- The Marilyn Monroe Party (2002)
