= NewsGuild-CWA =

American labor union, part of the CWA

The NewsGuild-CWA
- Merged into: Communications Workers of America
- Founded: 1933; 93 years ago
- Headquarters: Washington, D.C.
- Location: United States, Canada
- Members: 26,000
- President: Jon Schleuss
- Parent organization: Communications Workers of America
- Affiliations: IFJ, AFL–CIO
- Website: newsguild.org

The NewsGuild-CWA is a labor union founded by newspaper journalists in 1933.

The NewsGuild-CWA's constitution says its purpose is to fight for honesty in journalism and the news industry's business practices in addition to improving wages and working conditions.

The NewsGuild-CWA now represents workers in a wide range of roles including editorial, technology, advertising, and others at newspapers, online publications, magazines, news services, and in broadcast, as well as the staff of nonprofit organizations and spoken-language and sign-language interpreters and translators. The current president is Jon Schleuss.

== History ==
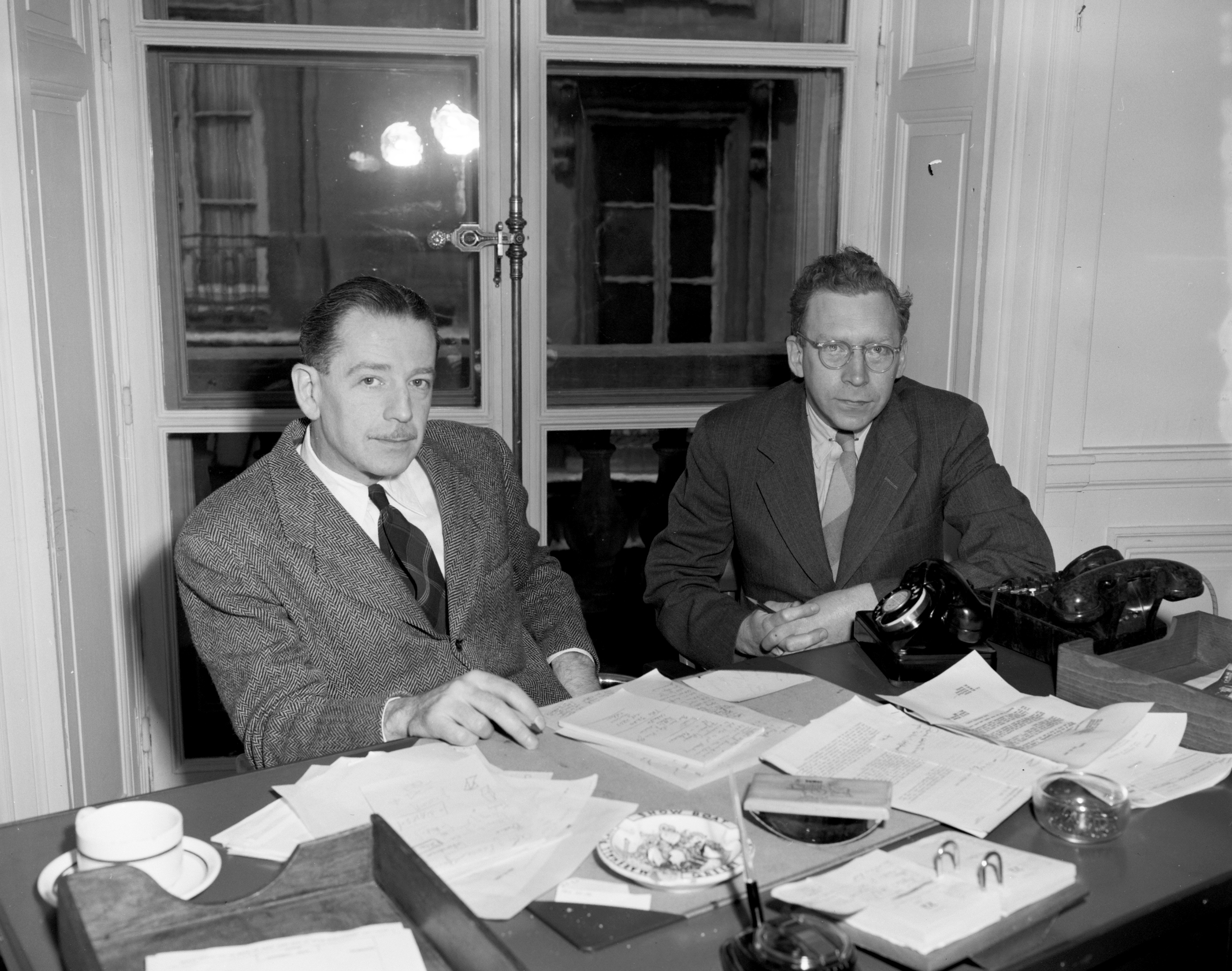
American Newspaper Guild members in Paris

The organization's founders were Joseph Cookman an editor of the New York Post, Allen Raymond of the New York Herald Tribune and Heywood Broun of the New York World-Telegram. The inaugural chapter was based in Cleveland, Ohio, and Carl Randau was its first director from 1934 to 1940. It was originally called the American Newspaper Guild, but it simplified its name to Newspaper Guild in the 1970s to reflect the fact that it also operated outside the United States. It had expanded into Canada in the 1950s.

It became affiliated with the American Federation of Labor in 1936, then left to go into the new Congress of Industrial Organizations in 1937, when it expanded its membership to non-editorial departments. It merged with the Communications Workers of America in 1995. The Guild is also affiliated with the International Federation of Journalists.

The Guild has more than 25,000 members in the United States, Canada and Puerto Rico. Its membership has expanded from just journalists to many other employees of newspapers and news agencies, such as clerks who take classified ads and computer support workers. It also represents workers in a number of other industries.

In 2015, the union changed its name from Newspaper Guild to its current name, NewsGuild, to reflect that newspapers are not the only publishers of news.

In 2021, the union changed its logo to reincorporate an eye motif from the original logos back to the union's founding and to modernize the look of the union for the future.

In 2024, media outlets reported that a high-profile organizer for the NewsGuild, Nastaran Mohit, wrote several posts on X that some NewsGuild members deemed anti-Semitic and violent. Mohit's comments included "Zionist butchers know how to kill" and referred to Zionists as "depraved monsters who will meet their fate one day." The Guild hired a law firm to investigate the actions as well as those of other Guild staffers who wrote criticism of the work of the journalists they represent in labor negotiations. “It’s clear that some of the people we pay to represent us hate us because … they not only attack the New York Times but journalism itself,” one longtime staffer told The New York Post.

=== Broun's influence ===
Heywood Broun was one of the most respected journalists and most popular, highly paid contributors. On August 7, 1933, Broun noted, in his New York World-Telegram column, the current economic gains of the newspaper's business. His understanding of economics distinguished him among is fellow journalists, and brought him into dialogue with newspaper management. The advocated for a trade union of journalists. Broun wrote, "the fact that newspaper editors and owners are genial folk should hardly stand in the way of organization of a newspaper writers' union. There should be [always] one." His column has influenced journalists from many states to rise up in opposition to the newspapers' authorities and organize by publishers to show the importance of the newspaper union and expanding the foundation.

Heywood launched the Guild during the Depression. During the earlier times of the Guild, there were complaints from the "rapacious" publishers about federal regulation of minimum wages and maximum hours for newsroom workers set by the National Recovery Act. The publishers wanted a tax deferral on constitutional grounds since their First Amendment rights would be compromised if the government enforced a forty-hour work week, which was considered restrictive.

Newsmen and newswomen rallied around Broun's call for labor union. The Newspaper Guild, representing journalists and other written media workers since 1933, became one of the most continuous and effective media organizations in the United States.

=== Status in 1942 ===
In 1942 Henning Heldt, as a Nieman Fellow, contributed an article on the Newspaper Guild to a collection published by Nieman Fellows that year at Harvard University.

In 1934 a convention of the Guild was held in St. Paul, Minnesota. In an effort to elevate the standards of journalism, it was resolved:

That the American Newspaper Guild strive tirelessly for integrity of news columns and the opportunity for its members to discharge their social responsibility: not stopping until the men and women who write, graphically portray or edit news have achieved freedom of conscience to report faithfully, when they occur – and refuse by distortion and suppression to create – political, economic, industrial and military wars.

Heldt described the radical past, arrival, and conservative turn of the Guild in 1942:

The Guild's radical strength is in the New York unit. Estimated at but one-tenth of the total membership of that unit, the radical element has been able to constitute a majority in the past at most meetings by being able to command full attendance of its group. Control of the New York unit with its large membership and voting power at national conventions, equal to one-fifth of the whole Guild, gave this element a disproportionate influence.

The Guild has established itself as a fixture in the American newspaper scene. The early period of mushrooming growth has come to an end. But the number of locals, of dues-paid members, and of signed contracts continues to grow.

Militant and leftist in both policies and politics during its formative years, the Guild has now swung abruptly to the right, following a national referendum last fall. A conservative slate of officers was elected on a platform promising strict attention to economic activities of the Guild, strict avoidance of any radical political action.

Positing a "legend of newsmen", Heldt lamented that the Guild finished off the legend:

The coming of the Guild has destroyed, however, the romantic legend of the profession of journalism. Gone forever are the days when the newspaperman himself, as well as the public, considered his work as something unique, a shining adventure and somewhat sanctified calling, not to be measured in terms of dollar-and-cent rewards. Newspapermen now realize their place in the economic picture. They know themselves to be skilled white-collar workers and have adopted the methods of other skilled groups to improve their economic status.

In 1970s, the union expanded its scope outside of the United States. and adopted the name of Newspaper Guild or TNG. It also collaborated with another union called the Communications Workers of America (CWA) in 1977. The combined union had hundreds of thousands of workers in telecommunications and media, and later adopted a new name, The Newspaper Guild-CWA.

== Campaigns ==
In 1957, the Guild adopted a resolution demanding that the United States end its prohibition on the travel of American journalists to China. The Guild described the travel ban as "offensive intrusion against people's right to know in a democracy such as ours and an unwarranted hindrance of newsmen in the pursuit of their duty to keep our people informed."

On May 18, 2020, the NewsGuild launched the Save The News campaign to advocate for local news outlets as part of the federal government's response to the COVID-19 pandemic. Between January and August 2020, as many as 36,000 journalists had experienced pay cuts, furloughs, or layoffs.

As part of the campaign, the group has supported legislative efforts, such as S.3718, to expand access to the Paycheck Protection Program (PPP) for local news outlets that have been excluded from it, as well as H.R.7640 to create tax credits incentivizing subscribing to and advertising in local newspapers.

In July 2020, NewsGuild president Jon Schleuss sent a letter to Senate Majority Leader Mitch McConnell, noting his warning "that the local news industry is facing an extinction-level event".

On April 13, 2021, more than 650 tech workers at The New York Times announced that they were unionizing with the NewsGuild-CWA. In July 2021 the workers filed for union certification with the National Labor Relations Board. On August 11, 2021, the New York Times Tech Guild held a half-day work stoppage in protest of alleged union-busting tactics from the New York Times management for which the Guild filed at least three unfair labor practices charges with the NLRB. If the union is certified, it will be the largest union representing tech workers with collective bargaining rights in the country. The New York Times Tech Guild campaign exists within the broader context of the Campaign to Organize Digital Employees (CODE-CWA) initiative by the Communications Workers of America to organize tech, game, and digital workers in the US and Canada.

== Presidents ==
1933: Heywood Broun
1940: Kenneth G. Crawford
1940: Donal M. Sullivan
1941: Milton Murray
1947: Harry Martin
1953: Joseph F. Collis
1959: Arthur Rosenstock
1967: James B. Woods
1969: Charles Perlik
1987: Charles Dale
1995: Linda Foley
2008: Bernie Lunzer
2019: Jon Schleuss

== See also ==
- C.H. Garrigues, union organizer
- Campaign to Organize Digital Employees (CODE-CWA)
- Communications Workers of America
- List of NewsGuild-CWA Locals
- San Francisco newspaper strike of 1994
