= The Curse of the Moon Child =

1972 American film

- Starring: Adam West; Sherry Jackson; Jeremy Slate
- Production company: Gold Key Entertainment
- Release date: October 21, 1977 (television airing)
- Running time: 95 minutes
- Country: United States
- Language: English

The Curse of the Moon Child is a 1972 American horror film starring Adam West, Sherry Jackson, and Jeremy Slate. Its plot focuses on a Victorian-era English village whose children born under the astrological sign of Cancer are compelled to join a demonic union.

== Background ==
Little is known about the film's production or availability, and it was described by writers Harvey Fenton and David Flint in Ten Years of Terror: British Horror Films of the 1970s (2001) as "an obscure film [that] has former Batman Adam West battling a Satanic cult who specialise in human sacrifice." The film was shot in 16mm around 1972.

The Waterloo Courier lists the film as having aired on television on October 21, 1977. It screened on late-night television the following week in Cedar Rapids, Iowa, on October 28, 1977.

== Reception ==
Sandra Brennan of the AllMovie Guide awarded the film a two-and-a-half out of five star-rating.
