= Jon Schleuss =

American labor union leader

- Education: University of Arkansas
- Occupations: Data journalist, trade unionist
- Title: President of the NewsGuild-CWA

Jon Schleuss is an American data journalist and trade union leader who currently serves as the president of the NewsGuild-CWA. He was first elected on December 10, 2019 in a rerun election by a vote of 1,979 to 1,514. The original election, which Schleuss lost by 271 votes, was set aside by union officials in August 2019 after more than 1,000 members failed to receive ballots.

Prior to his election, Schleuss worked as a data and graphics journalist in the Los Angeles Times Data and Graphics Department. During his time in Los Angeles, Schleuss participated in the campaign to bring union representation to The Times.

Before joining The Times in 2013, Schleuss was the online editor of the Northwest Arkansas Democrat-Gazette and worked as a host for an NPR member station based in Fayetteville, Arkansas.
