= And When the Sky Was Opened =

- The Twilight Zone episode
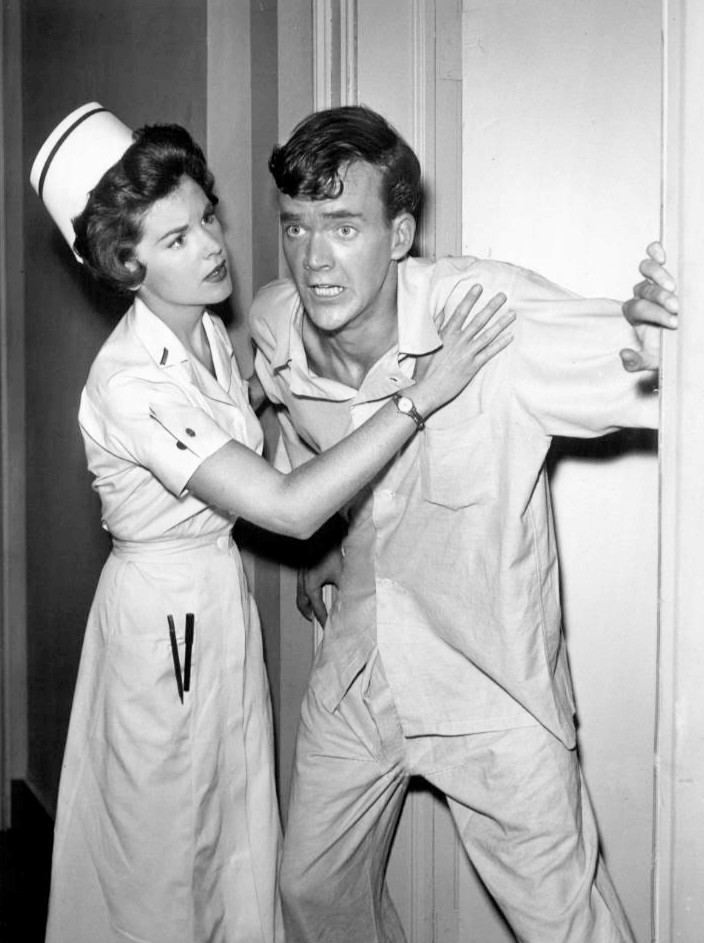
- Sue Randall and Jim Hutton
- Episode no.: Season 1 Episode 11
- Directed by: Douglas Heyes
- Teleplay by: Rod Serling
- Based on: "Disappearing Act" by Richard Matheson
- Cinematography by: George T. Clemens
- Production code: 173-3611
- Original air date: December 11, 1959

Guest appearances
- Rod Taylor as Lieutenant Colonel Clegg Forbes; Charles Aidman as Colonel Ed Harrington; Jim Hutton as Major William Gart; Maxine Cooper as Amy; Sue Randall as Nurse; Paul Bryar as Bartender; Joe Bassett as Medical officer; Gloria Pall as Girl in bar; Elizabeth Fielding as Blond Nurse

Episode chronology
← Previous "Judgment Night"	Next → "What You Need"
- The Twilight Zone (1959 TV series, season 1)

"And When the Sky Was Opened" is the eleventh episode of the American television anthology series The Twilight Zone. It originally aired on December 11, 1959. It is an adaptation of the 1953 Richard Matheson short story "Disappearing Act."

== Opening narration ==
Her name: X-20. Her type: an experimental interceptor. Recent history: a crash landing in the Mojave Desert after a thirty-one hour flight nine hundred miles into space. Incidental data: the ship, with the men who flew her, disappeared from the radar screen for twenty-four hours.

The narration continues after the introduction of Lieutenant Colonel Clegg Forbes (Rod Taylor).

But the shrouds that cover mysteries are not always made out of a tarpaulin, as this man will soon find out on the other side of a hospital door.

== Plot ==
USAF Lieutenant Colonel Clegg Forbes arrives at a military hospital to visit his friend and co-pilot Major William Gart. The two had recently piloted an experimental spaceplane, the X-20. During their voyage the craft disappeared from radar screens for a full day before reappearing and crash landing in the desert, leaving Gart with a broken leg. Forbes is agitated and asks Gart if he remembers how many people were on the mission. Gart confirms that only he and Forbes piloted the plane, but Forbes insists that a third man – Colonel Ed Harrington, his best friend of 15 years – accompanied them.

In a flashback, Harrington and Forbes are discharged from the hospital after passing their physical exams. While visiting a bar downtown, Harrington is suddenly overcome by a feeling that he no longer "belongs" in the world. Disturbed, he phones his parents, who tell him they have no son named Ed and believe the person calling them is a prankster. Harrington then mysteriously vanishes from the phone booth and no one but Forbes remembers his existence. Increasingly desperate, Forbes fruitlessly searches for any trace of his friend.

Back in the present, Forbes finishes recounting the story to Gart. He is dismayed by his friend's claim that he doesn't know anyone named Harrington. Forbes then glances at a mirror and discovers he casts no reflection, causing him to flee the room in terror. Gart tries to hobble after him only to find that Forbes has disappeared. Calling the duty nurse to ask if she saw where Forbes went, Gart is stunned by the nurse's claim that nobody named Forbes was ever in the building and that Gart was the lone man in the hospital room all along, as well as the only person who went on the space mission. As she leaves, Gart is horrified and also disappears.

An officer enters the building and asks the duty nurse if there are any unused rooms available to accommodate new patients. The nurse takes him to the now completely empty room which had hosted the three astronauts, telling him that it is unoccupied. The hangar which previously housed the X-20 is then shown, with the sheet that covered the craft lying on the ground. There is no trace of the plane, as if it and its crew had never existed.

== Closing narration ==
Once upon a time, there was a man named Harrington, a man named Forbes, a man named Gart. They used to exist, but don't any longer. Someone – or something – took them somewhere. At least they are no longer a part of the memory of man. And as to the X-20 supposed to be housed here in this hangar, this, too, does not exist. And if any of you have any questions concerning an aircraft and three men who flew her, speak softly of them – and only in – The Twilight Zone.

== Episode notes ==
This episode is loosely based on the short story "Disappearing Act" by Richard Matheson. The story was first published in The Magazine of Fantasy and Science Fiction (March 1953).

Rod Taylor and director Douglas Heyes later worked together on the TV series Bearcats! The episode was an early acting appearance by Jim Hutton.

== Bibliography ==
- DeVoe, Bill (2008). Trivia from The Twilight Zone. Albany, GA: Bear Manor Media. ISBN 978-1-59393-136-0.
- Grams, Martin (2008). The Twilight Zone: Unlocking the Door to a Television Classic. Churchville, MD: OTR Publishing. ISBN 978-0-9703310-9-0.
