= Jeremy Slate =

American actor (1926–2006)

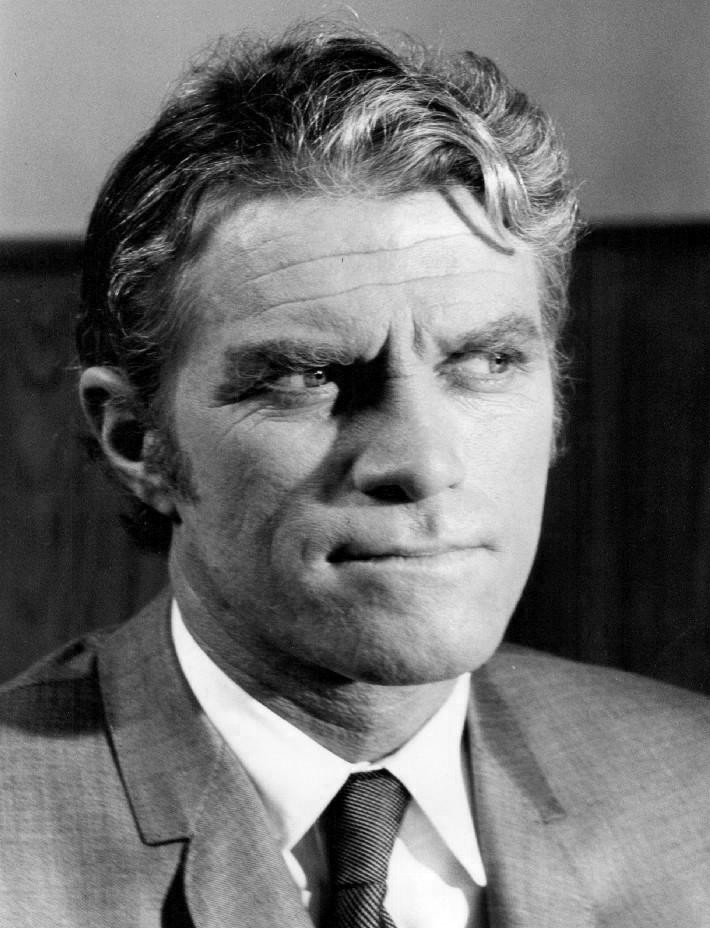
- Slate, early 1970s
- Born: Robert Bullard Perham; February 17, 1926 in California, U.S.
- Died: November 19, 2006 (aged 80); Los Angeles, California, U.S.
- Education: St. Lawrence University
- Occupations: Film and television actor
- Spouses: Beverly Van Wert (m. 1948; div. 1966) Tammy Grimes (m. 1966; div. 1967)
- Children: 5

Jeremy Slate (born Robert Bullard Perham; February 17, 1926 – November 19, 2006) was an American film and television actor, and songwriter. He is best known for portraying Larry Lahr in The Aquanauts (1960–1961), Chuck Wilson in One Life to Live (1979–1987) and as Deputy Sheriff Ben Latta in The Sons of Katie Elder (1965).

== Early life ==
He attended a military academy and joined the United States Navy when he was sixteen. He was barely eighteen when his destroyer assisted in the Normandy Invasion on D-Day (June 6, 1944). After the war he attended St. Lawrence University in Canton, New York, where he graduated with honors in English. He was also president of the student body, a member of the honor society, editor of the college literary magazine, a football player, and the backfield coach of the only undefeated team in the history of the university. He was a campus radio personality who married the queen of his fraternity's ball during his senior year. After graduation he became a radio sportscaster and DJ for several CBS and ABC affiliates while beginning a family that included three sons and one daughter but ultimately this marriage ended in divorce. Several years thereafter, he had a second daughter.

For six years, Slate had a promising career with W. R. Grace and Co. as a public relations executive and travel manager for company president J. Peter Grace. He then joined Grace Steamship Lines and moved with his family to Lima, Peru. There he joined a professional theatre group, became involved with a production of The Rainmaker and was awarded the Tiahuanacothe, the Peruvian equivalent of the Tony Award, for his portrayal of the character Starbuck. After a year of training, he left W. R. Grace to pursue a theatrical career.

== Film and TV career ==
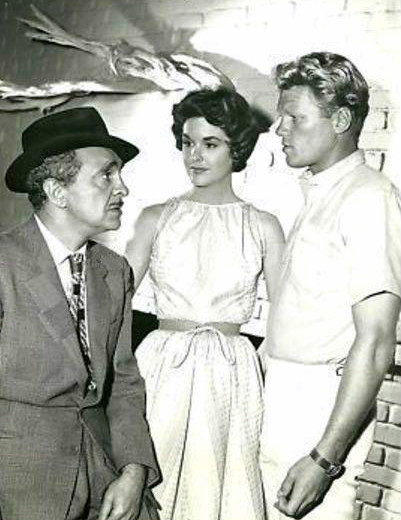
Sam Levene, Sue Randall and Slate in The Aquanauts (1960)

Slate co-starred with Ron Ely in the 1960–1961 Ivan Tors series The Aquanauts, which was renamed Malibu Run halfway during its brief run on CBS. The series could not compete successfully in the same time slot as NBC's durable western Wagon Train. He guest-starred in nearly 100 television shows and appeared in twenty feature films. Among his many television appearances were two roles in the courtroom drama series Perry Mason, both times as Perry's client: In season 3, 1960, he played Bob Lansing in the episode, "The Case of the Ominous Outcast", and in season 5, 1962, he played Philip Andrews in "The Case of the Captain's Coins."

He guest-starred in the 1959–1960 syndicated western series, Pony Express, starring Grant Sullivan.

In 1963, Slate was cast as Mark Novak in the episode "The Loner" of the NBC modern western series, Empire, set on a ranch in New Mexico. In the storyline he became involved in a deadly boxing match with series character Tal Garrett (Ryan O'Neal). Also in 1963, he co-starred in an episode of the second season of Combat! called "Off Limits," produced and directed by Robert Altman. That same year, he played Elroy Daldran, a hired assassin out to kill Eliot Ness, in "A Taste for Pineapple", the final episode (series finale) of The Untouchables starring Robert Stack. Finally in 1963, he appeared in James Arness's TV Western series Gunsmoke, as gunslinger Billy Hargis in “Carter Caper” (season 9, episode 8).

He played a troubled surfer in a 1962, season 3 episode of Route 66 called "Ever Ride the Waves in Oklahoma?". In 1965 he starred as Wally in season 1, episode 21 of Bewitched, titled "Ling Ling". He later guest-starred as a German infiltrator in a fourth-season episode of Combat! titled ”The Mockingbird” (aired 1966).

Slate played Hank in the NBC comedy Accidental Family in 1967–1968.

From 1979 to 1987, Slate portrayed Chuck Wilson on the ABC daytime soap opera One Life to Live. For a short time, from April to October 1985, while Slate was not on One Life to Live, he portrayed the character of Locke Walls on the CBS daytime drama (soap opera) Guiding Light.

Slate performed in nine episodes of CBS's long-running Western series Gunsmoke, including in the role of a likable but doomed cowboy in the 1962 episode "The Gallows" written by John Meston. He also guest-starred three times on The Alfred Hitchcock Hour on CBS and then NBC, on CBS's Mission: Impossible and The New Adventures of Wonder Woman, ABC's Bewitched, then NBC's My Name Is Earl.

Slate's acting career included major roles in four outlaw biker films in the late 1960s: The Born Losers (1967), The Mini-Skirt Mob (1968), Hell's Belles (1969) and Hell's Angels '69. As the leader of the Born Losers Motorcycle Club in The Born Losers, Slate played a ruthless yet likable character who took on Billy Jack. In Hell's Angels '69, for which he wrote the screen story, Slate played a man who used the Hells Angels as unwitting dupes in a plan to rob a casino in Las Vegas. Several real-life members of the Hell's Angels had significant speaking roles in the film, including Angels president Ralph "Sonny" Barger, Terry the Tramp and Magoo. Slate broke his leg during filming and never rode a motorcycle again. He also played a notable role as a Deputy Sheriff in the western The Sons of Katie Elder starring John Wayne (1965).

== Songwriting career ==
Slate was an accomplished country-and-western songwriter and BMI member. He wrote the lyrics to Tex Ritter's top twenty song "Just Beyond the Moon" and wrote the lyrics for "Every Time I Itch (I Wind Up Scratchin' You)" recorded by Glen Campbell on Capitol Records. Slate and Campbell had starred together in the 1969 movie, True Grit.

== Personal life ==
He was briefly married to the actress Tammy Grimes and was stepfather to actress Amanda Plummer during this time.

In the 1970s, Slate was involved with feminist archaeologist Sally Binford. Their adventures in the sexual freedom movement were chronicled in Gay Talese's 1980 book Thy Neighbor's Wife.

In 2000, he married Denise Mellinger Slate, a writer and film producer. He was stepfather to Joseph Tolen and Erin Tolen.

In 2004, he attended as a guest at the Western Film Fair in Charlotte, North Carolina, along with Stella Stevens, Andrew Prine and Sonny Shroyer. His partner at the time of his death was Joan Benedict-Steiger. He had two living sons, and two daughters; one son had preceded him in death.

== Death ==
On November 19, 2006, Slate died in Los Angeles, California, following surgery for esophageal cancer.

== Filmography ==
- That Kind of Woman (1959) as Sailor (uncredited)
- North by Northwest (1959) as Policeman at Grand Central Station #2 (uncredited)
- One Step Beyond (1961)
- Alfred Hitchcock Presents (1960) (Season 5 Episode 32: "One Grave Too Many") as Joe Helmer
- G.I. Blues (1960) as Turk
- Alfred Hitchcock Presents (1962) (Season 7 Episode 36: "First Class Honeymoon") as Carl Seabrook
- Perry Mason (1962) (Season 5 Episode 17: "The Case of the Captain's Coins") as Philip Andrews
- The Alfred Hitchcock Hour (1962) (Season 1 Episode 10: "Day of Reckoning") as Trent Parker, the Golf Professional
- Girls! Girls! Girls! (1962) as Wesley Johnson
- Wives and Lovers (1963) as Gar Aldrich
- The Alfred Hitchcock Hour (1964) (Season 2 Episode 14: "Beyond the Sea of Death") as Keith Holloway
- The Alfred Hitchcock Hour (1965) (Season 3 Episode 16: "One of the Family") as Dexter Dailey
- Bewitched (1965) as Wally (Season 1 Ep 21: "Ling Ling")
- I'll Take Sweden (1965) as Erik Carlson
- The Sons of Katie Elder (1965) as Ben Latta
- The Born Losers (1967) as Daniel 'Danny' Carmody
- The Devil's Brigade (1968) as Sergeant Patrick O'Neill
- The Mini-Skirt Mob (1968) as Lon
- The Hooked Generation (1968) as Daisey
- The Princess and Me (1968) (unsold pilot, never broadcast) as State Department officer
- Hell's Belles (1969) as Dan
- True Grit (1969) as Emmett Quincy
- Hell's Angels '69 (1969) as Wes
- Mission: Impossible (1971) as Frederick Hoffman
- Drag Racer (1972) as Ron
- The Curse of the Moon Child (1972)
- The Centerfold Girls (1974) as Sergeant Garrett
- Stranger in Our House (1978) as Tom Bryant
- Mr. Horn (1979) as Captain Emmet Crawford
- The Dead Pit (1989) as Dr. Gerald Swan
- Voyage of the Heart (1989) as Chairman
- Goodnight, Sweet Marilyn (1989) as 'Mesquite'
- Dream Machine (1991) as Jack Chamberlain
- The Lawnmower Man (1992) as Father Francis McKeen
