= Sue Randall =

American actress (1935–1984)

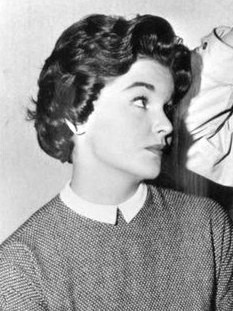
- Randall in 1964
- Born: Marion Burnside Randall; October 8, 1935; Philadelphia, Pennsylvania, U.S.
- Died: October 26, 1984 (aged 49); Philadelphia, Pennsylvania, U.S.
- Education: American Academy of Dramatic Arts
- Years active: 1955–1967
- Known for: Leave It to Beaver; Valiant Lady
- Spouses: Peter Blake Powell; James J. McSparron
- Children: 2

Marion Burnside Randall (October 8, 1935 – October 26, 1984), who acted under the name Sue Randall, was an American television actress whose entire 17-year career (1950 to 1967) was spent in episodes of TV series, and one film (1957). Her best-known role was the kindly Miss Alice Landers, Theodore "Beaver" Cleaver's elementary-school teacher in the CBS and ABC sitcom Leave It to Beaver.

== Early life and education ==
Born in Philadelphia, Sue Randall was born Marion Burnside Randall, the younger child of Marion Burnside (née Heist) and Roland Rodrock Randall, a prominent real-estate consultant. She began acting on stage at the age of 10 in a production of the Alden Park Players.

In 1953, she completed her early education at the Lankenau School for Girls in the Germantown District of Philadelphia and then moved to New York, where she attended the American Academy of Dramatic Arts, graduating with honors.

== Film and television career ==
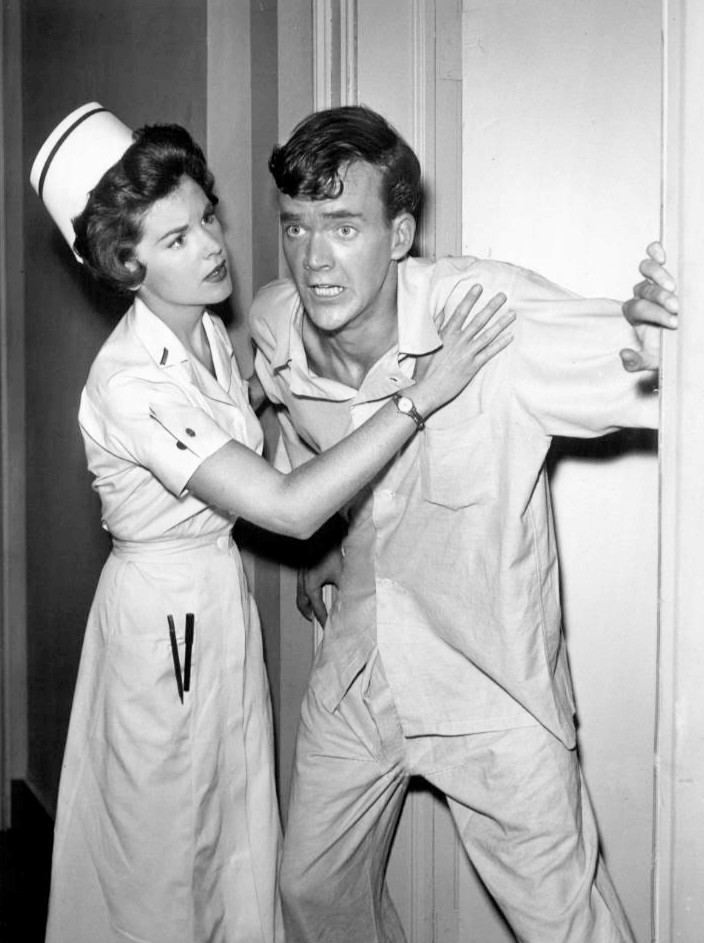
Randall with Jim Hutton in "And When the Sky Was Opened," a 1959 episode of The Twilight Zone.

Randall's credited TV debut came in the 1955 episode "Golden Victory" of the series Star Tonight. She was one of the actresses who had the role of Diane Emerson in the television version of Valiant Lady (1953-1957). In 1954, she also portrayed Diane Emerson on the CBS drama Woman with a Past.

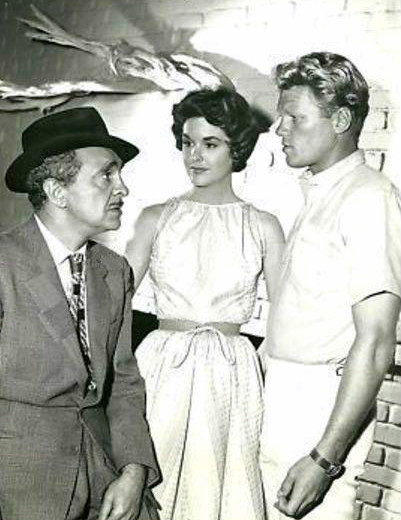
Sam Levene, Randall (center) and Jeremy Slate in The Aquanauts (1960)

Randall appeared in other television productions before portraying Ruthie Saylor, a reference-desk worker, in the 1957 film Desk Set starring Spencer Tracy and Katharine Hepburn. Randall's recurring role as a teacher on Leave It to Beaver spanned the years 1958 to 1962, when the actress was in her 20s. She appeared in 28 episodes of the popular sitcom after replacing Diane Brewster, who played Miss Canfield during the first season and in the 1980s television movies based on the series. Randall's first appearance as Miss Landers was in the Leave It to Beaver episode "Ward's Problem," which originally aired on October 16, 1958.

Primarily, Randall's roles on television were as a featured actor or supporting character, often in Westerns. For example, she was cast as Kathy O'Hara, an aspiring concert pianist, in the episode "The Mysterious Stranger" (February 17, 1959) on the ABC/Warner Bros. series Sugarfoot. She was cast in "Judgment Day" (October 11, 1959) on the ABC series The Rebel as Elaine, the daughter of a man sentenced to hang.

In the late 1950s, producers cast Randall as a co-star with actress Theodora Davitt in a proposed weekly sitcom titled Up on Cloud Nine. A pilot for this comedy was completed, but no potential sponsors opted to buy or underwrite the series about "the daffy misadventures" of two airline stewardesses. In the pilot episode's storyline, described by one later reviewer as "painfully unfunny", Randall and Davitt's characters insult passengers and frighten them while in flight by mistakenly preparing their plane for a crash landing.

Randall appeared in other series, including CBS's The Twilight Zone, Have Gun – Will Travel, Gunsmoke (as Laura in “Millie" and as Effie Strayhorn in "The Cook"), Bat Masterson, The Aquanauts, Pete and Gladys, Ichabod and Me, Hennesey, NBC's Bonanza, The Man and the Challenge, ABC's The Real McCoys, The Dakotas, 77 Sunset Strip, The Fugitive, and The Rifleman. In addition, she made three guest appearances on Sea Hunt in 1961. That same year, she also guest-starred as Ellen in the episode "The Secret Life of James Thurber," based on the works of American humorist James Thurber, in the CBS anthology series The DuPont Show with June Allyson. She made two guest appearances on Perry Mason, both times as the defendant: Betty Wilkins in the 1960 episode, "The Case of the Ill-Fated Faker" and Arnell Stiller, alias Amy Scott, in the 1964 episode, "The Case of the Garrulous Go-Between."

Randall appeared also in five episodes of the syndicated Western anthology Death Valley Days. Her last performance in that series was in 1966 when she was cast as Carrie Huntington in the episode "The Courtship of Carrie Huntington."

== Personal life ==
Randall married Peter Blake Powell in 1957, and the couple had two children. It was to second husband, James J. McSparron, that she was married at the time of her death.

== Later years and death ==
Randall retired from acting in 1967 after performing in the episode "Heaven Help Us" on the televised anthology series Vacation Playhouse. Two years later, she left California and returned to Philadelphia where she soon began working in administrative roles with various charitable organizations. She participated in telethons and other local events to raise money to support programs and research battling arthritis, multiple sclerosis, and blindness, and providing poor children with a better education.

Randall died of lung cancer and larynx cancer at Pennsylvania Hospital in Philadelphia on October 26, 1984, at age 49.

== Filmography ==
Year	Title	Role	Notes
1950	A Wonderful Life	College Girl Holding Newspaper	Short film (uncredited)
1955	Star Tonight		S1.E17 - "Golden Victory"
1955	Ponds Theater		S2.E37 - "Life and Taxes"
1955–1956	Valiant Lady	Diane Emerson Soames #3	510 episodes
1957	Playhouse 90	Kitty Verdun	S1.E26 - "Where's Charley?"
1957	Desk Set	Ruthie Saylor	Only full-length film role
1957–1958	Matinee Theatre		S2.E213 - "The Awakening"; S3.E129 - "The Canterville Ghost"
1958	Bronco	Hope Cabot	S1.E1. - "The Besieged"
1958	Steve Canyon	Sgt. Addie Malone	S1.E5 - "Operation Jettison"
1958	The Millionaire	Kate	S5.E11 - "The Newman Johnson Story"
1958 1962	Leave It to Beaver	Miss Alice Landers	28 episodes
1959, 1960	77 Sunset Strip	Chick Hammons; Ruth Douglas; Alice Smith Gallante	S1.E13 - "Hit And Run"; S1.E34 - "Strange Girl in Town"; S3.E13 - "The Affairs of Adam Gallente"
1959	Sugarfoot	Kathy O'Hara	S2.E12 - "The Mysterious Stranger"
1959	The Rifleman	Lucy Hallager	S1.E40 - "The Mind Reader"
1959	The Real McCoys	Susan Meade	S3.E10 - "The Girl at Mom's Place"
1959	General Electric Theater	Bride's Friend	S8.E4 - "Night Club"
1959	The Rebel	Elaine Randall	S1.E2 - "Judgement"
1959	M Squad	Mrs. Jim Wilson	S3.E7 - "Mama's Boy" (uncredited)
1959	Wagon Train	Mrs. Sherman	S3.E12 - "The St. Nicolas Story"
1959	Grand Jury	Union Boss's Daughter	S1.E13 " Off the Record"
1959	Have Gun - Will Travel	Anna Ainslee	S3.E5 - "Shot by Request"
1959, 1962, 1963, 1964, 1966	Death Valley Days	Bessie Riggs; Martha Clark; Virginia Slade; Julie; Mary Ann Duncan; Carrie Huntington	S8.E2 - ""Gates Ajar" Morgan"; S11.E12 - "The Private Mint of Clark, Gruber and Co."; S12.E6 - "The Man Who Died Twice"; S12.E25 - "See the Elephant and Hear the Owl"; S13.E11 - "A Bargain is for Keeping"; S14.E18 - "The Courtship of Carrie Huntington"
1959; 1964	The Twilight Zone	Nurse; Millie	S1.E11 - "And When the Sky Was Opened"; S5.E20 - "From Agnes - With Love"
1959; 1961	Hennesey	Linda Shafer; Gloria Landis	S1.E13 - "The Matchmaker"; S2.E24 - "The Green-Eyed Monster"
1960	Have Gun - Will Travel	Ruth	S3.E17 - "The Day of the Bad Man"
1960	The Man and the Challenge	Phyllis Wright	S1.E19 - "The Windowless Room"
1960	New Comedy Showcase	Lois	S1.E1 - "You're Only Young Twice"
1960	Bat Masterson	Elizabeth	S3.E5 - "The Hunter"
1960	The Life and Legend of Wyatt Earp	Lucy Tedder	S6.E6 - "Big Brother"
1960	The Aquanauts	Mimi Newell	S1.E9 - "Night Dive"
1960	The Roaring 20's	Kathy Potter	S1.E6 - "Brother's Keeper"; S1.E7 - "Judge Seward's Secret"
1960	Thriller	Kay Salisbury	S1.E14 - "Man in the Middle"
1960, 1961	Gunsmoke	Effie; Laura	S6.E14 - "The Cook"; S7.E9 "Milly"
1960, 1961	Michael Shayne	Georgia; Marcella Colby	S1.E10 - "Murder Plays Charades"; S1.E29 - "The Trouble with Ernie"
1960, 1961	Perry Mason	Betty Wilkins; Amy Scott	S4.E3 - "The Case of the Ill-Fated Faker"; S7.E22 - The Case of the Garrulos Go-Between"
1961	Sea Hunt	Mary Carter; Liz Brenner; Peg Nicholson	S4.E7 - "Rescue"; S4.E32 - "Superman"; S4.E37 - "Crime at Sea"
1961	The Jim Backus Show	Evelyn Darton	S1.E21 - "Once Upon A Moose"
1961	Lock-Up	Peggy Tyler	S2.E23 - "Fugitive from Fear"
1961	The Tom Ewell Show	Miss McNulty	S1.E20 - "Storm Over Shangri-La"
1961	The DuPont Show with June Allyson	Ellen Monroe	S2.E25 - "The Country Mouse"
1961	The Detectives	Jean Morley	S2.E27 - "Time for Decision"
1961	Surfside 6	Maggie Littrell	S1.E32 - "Spinout at Sebring"
1961, 1965	Bonanza	Ann Davis; Ann Fleming; Sue Watson	S43.E10 - "The Horse Breaker"; S46.E34 - "Patchwork Man"; S7.E9 - "Mighty Is the Word"
1962	Margie	Miss Franklin	S1.E17 - "A Lesson in Teaching"
1962	Pete and Gladys	Helen	S2.E27 - "Maternity House"
1962	I'm Dickens, He's Fenster	Bianca	S1.E6 - "The Acting Game"
1963	Saints and Sinners	Ann	S1.E15 - "Slug It, Miss Joyous"
1963	The Dakotas	Hardi Masters	S1.E13 - "Reformation at Big Nose Butte"
1963	Dr. Kildare	Emily Gunderson	S2.E29 - "The Balance and the Crucible"
1963	The Bill Dana Show	Margaret Ann Austin	S1.E3 - "Jose the Playboy"
1963	Ripcord	Nora Willis	S2.E38 - "Wrong Way Down"
1963; 1964; 1965	The Fugitive	Jen; Ruth Fisher; Nurse Thompson	S1.E11 - "Nightmare at Northoak"; S2.E4 - "When the Bough Breaks"; S3.E1 - "Wings of an Angel"
1964	Arrest and Trial	Maris Hewitt	S1.E19 - "Somewhat Lower Than the Angels"
1964	Summer Playhouse	Linda	"Satan's Waitin'"
1964	Wendy and Me	Ruth Harris	S1.E7 - "It Takes Two to Tangle"
1965	Profiles in Courage	Joan Owens	S1.E8 - "Robert A. Taft"
1965	Kraft Suspense Theatre	Anne Crane	S2.E15 - "Four into Zero"
1965	My Favorite Martian	Miss Turner	S2.E22 - "Crash Diet"
1965	O.K. Crackerby!	Miss Laura Shepherd	S1.E3 - "The Griffin Story"
1965	I Spy	Louise Richards	S1.E9 - "No Exchange on Damaged Merchandise"
1965	The Virginian	Sarah Bentley	S4.E9 - "Show Me a Hero"
1965	The F.B.I.	FBI Clerk	S1.E12 - "An Elephant Is Like a Rope"
1967	Vacation Playhouse	Ruth	S5.E4 - "Heaven Help Us" (final TV role before retirement)
