= Carl Randau =

American dramatist

Carl Randau (8 August 1893 - April 1969) was an American playwright and journalist.

== Biography ==
A native of Iowa, he moved to New York City in the 1930s where he was a journalist for the New York World-Telegram.

He was the President of The Newspaper Guild from 1934 to 1940. In 1940, he married Leane Zugsmith. After the Second World War, he and his wife visited Japan and China to work as correspondents for the newspaper PM.

== Bibliography ==
- The Setting Sun of Japan (1942) (with Leane Zugsmith)
- The Visitor (1944) (with Leane Zugsmith)
