= Leane Zugsmith =

20th century American writer

Leane Zugsmith (January 18, 1903 – October 13, 1969) was an American novelist and short story writer who frequently wrote about the economically disadvantaged and the shortcomings of capitalism.

== Biography ==
Zugsmith was born in Louisville, Kentucky on January 18, 1903, to German Jewish parents Albert Zugsmith and Gertrude Appel. Her mother attempted suicide several times and the couple finally divorced. Zugsmith spent her early childhood in Atlantic City, New Jersey; she later attended high school both in Atlantic City and Louisville, the home of her maternal grandparents.

Zugsmith attended Goucher College in Towson, Maryland for her freshman year and then the University of Pennsylvania in Philadelphia for her sophomore year. However, she only wanted to take creative writing courses. In 1924, she abandoned college and enrolled in a writing course at Columbia University in New York City. Despite her father's pleading to return to Atlantic City, she got a job at Smith and Street publishers as an editor for their detective and western magazines. She soon moved on to writing advertising and publicity copy, first for Putnam's Magazine and then Boni & Liveright. At this time she was writing and reading other authors, such as Émile Zola, Walt Whitman, and Leo Tolstoy. During this period, Zugsmith spent a year in year, becoming engaged during that time to a French man. However, her father successfully persuaded her not to marry him.

In 1928, Zugsmith published her first novel, All Victories Are Alike. A story of an idealistic young journalist who becomes a jaded member of New York intellectual society. The book received good reviews and moderate sales, though Zugsmith said she was embarrassed by it. She published her second novel, Goodbye and Tomorrow, in 1931. It is about one day in the life of a wealth society woman in New York City, an idea that Zugsmith said she borrowed from Virginia Woof.

She and playwright Carl Randau formed a salon, where she entertained guests such as Lillian Hellman, Dashiell Hammett, Heywood Broun, and Louis Kronenberger. She married Randau in 1940. She later moved to small-town New England.

She wrote novels and short stories. The Summer Soldier is about a civil rights committee that investigates allegations of violence against workers in a southern town.

American Naturalist writer Theodore Dreiser had a copy of Never Enough in his library.

Her younger brother, Albert Zugsmith, was an American film producer, film director and screenwriter who specialized in low-budget exploitation films through the 1950s and 1960s.

== Bibliography ==
- All Victories Are Alike (1929)
- Goodbye and Tomorrow (1931)
- Never Enough: A Novel (1932)
- The Reckoning (1934)
- A Time to Remember (1936)
- Home is Where You Hang Your Childhood and Other Stories (1937)
- L is for labor: A glossary of labor terms (1937)
- The Summer Soldier (1938)
- Hard times with easy payments: Fifteen short stories from "P M " (1941)
- The Setting Sun of Japan (1942, with husband Carl Randau)
- The Visitor (1946, with husband Carl Randau)
