= New York Times Guild =

Trade union

The New York Times Guild is the union of New York Times editorial, media, and tech professional workers, represented by NewsGuild since 1940. As of March 2022, the Times Tech Guild, is the largest tech union with collective bargaining rights in the United States.

== History ==
The Guild signed a contract in April 1941 for commercial department staff, and in August, was certified as the union for news and editorial workers.

In 2012, Times workers won a 35-hour workweek with eligibility for overtime on the 36th hour and time-and-a-half on the 40th hour, though most union workers work more than 35 hours.

After 19 months of negotiation, the Guild approved a contract in late 2012 through March 2016 including modest raises and bonuses, a new pension plan, and continues their existing health plan. As of 2021, the editorial union contained over 3,000 reporters and media professionals.

The union staged a one-day walkout in December 2022, their first in over 40 years, while negotiating wages and other issues as part of their contract renewal. Their prior contract had expired in March 2021.

In January 2022, the NewsGuild filed a complaint with the National Labor Relations Board accusing The New York Times Company of violating federal labor law by adding new paid days off to the company's holiday calendar exclusively for non-union workers, and the New York Times Guild accused the company of making similar changes to the company's bereavement policy, making it applicable only to non-union workers, later the same month.

In July 2023, the NewsGuild filed a grievance against The New York Times, accusing it of engaging in union-busting by announcing its intention to eliminate its sports section and to instead use non-union workers at The Athletic, which The New York Times acquired in 2022, to cover sports.

== Tech Guild ==
More than 600 tech workers of the Times announced their union as the Times Tech Guild in April 2021. Formed under NewsGuild, the union would include the newspaper's digital workers, including software developers, data analysts, designers, and product managers. The Times declined to voluntarily recognize the union, sending the question to a formal vote facilitated by the National Labor Relations Board (NLRB). On March 3, 2022, the tech workers voted 404 to 88 to certify the union. The bargaining unit is the largest American union of tech workers with bargaining rights. The Alphabet Workers Union is larger but is not recognized by the NLRB.

During the union drive, NewsGuild filed an unfair labor practice claim in June 2021 in which the company told workers overseeing the work of interns that they were restricted from displaying union support. Reviewing the claim, the NLRB filed a complaint of interference in unionizing efforts, a violation of federal labor law. The case was scheduled to be heard in March 2022.

In 2019, the New York Times Company voluntarily recognized a separate union representing tech workers at Wirecutter.

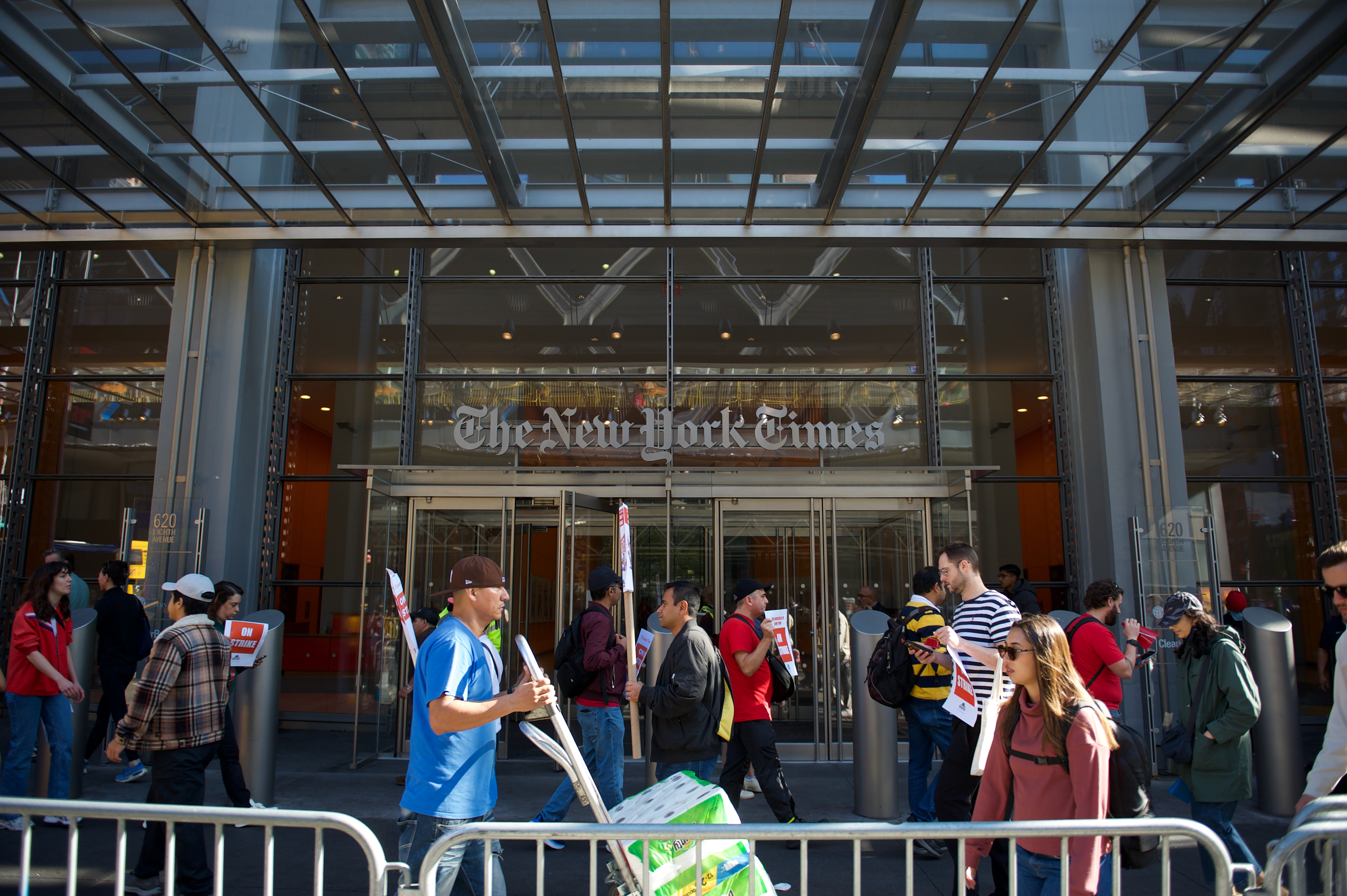
Workers on strike in front of The New York Times Building on Election Day

In November 2024, one day before the 2024 US presidential election, the Times Tech Guild went on strike over issues the union said were related to "remote/hybrid work," "just cause" protections, and "pay equity/fair pay," and asked readers to honor their digital picket line by not playing NYT Games or using the NYT Cooking app.
