= The Bells of St. Mary's (disambiguation) =

The Bells of St. Mary's may refer to:

- The Bells of St. Mary's (1937 film), a 1937 British film, starring John Garrick, released by MGM's UK division
- The Bells of St. Mary's, a 1945 film
- The Bells of St. Mary's (1959 film), a 1959 made-for-television film
- "The Bells of St. Mary's" (song), a popular song
