= Barbara Myers =

American former child performer

- Born: Barbara Ellen Myers; 1946 (age 79–80); Brooklyn, New York, New York, U.S.
- Education: Hunter College
- Occupations: Actress, model
- Years active: 1950–1967
- Spouse(s): Gerald Siegal (m. circa 1966)

Barbara Ellen Myers (born 1946) is an American former child model and stage and television actress, perhaps best known as Diane Sherwood in the soap opera Woman with a Past, and as the youngest of Kim Stanley's three "alter egos" in the Broadway production of Arthur Laurents's A Clearing in the Woods.

== Early life and career ==
Born in Brooklyn in 1946, and raised in Bensonhurst, Myers is the daughter of Mr. and Mrs. Ned Myers. She attended Hunter College.

In December 1950, at age 4, Myers was the subject of a brief write-up and photo in the Brooklyn Eagle, describing her as "no stranger to the camera lens" and a Conover model who was, at that moment, "[a]dorning the covers of current issues of several national magazines". By the summer of 1952, she was one of the "Wildroot gleam girl[s]" occupying the back cover of Ladies' Home Journal, as well as assorted pages of various magazines, as part of the national ad campaign for Lady Wildroot shampoo.

In the fall of 1953, Myers appeared in three episodes of the religious program Lamp Unto My Feet, then replaced Lucille Graygor as the youngest daughter Angela in the final few episodes of the short-lived NBC sitcom, Bonino.

In January 1954, she appeared with Gage Clark and Lois Bolton in "T.R. and the Buttercups", an episode of the popular series, Mama, Two months later, she was being dubbed "one of the cutest stage and tv actresses we've seen" by nationally syndicated columnist Earl Wilson. In the meantime, she had joined the cast of the daytime soap, Woman with a Past, portraying Diane Sherwood, daughter of the show's protagonist, Lyn Sherwood (Constance Ford). Later that year, Myers appeared in two episodes of Kraft Television Theatre: as Pearl, Hester Prynne's illegitimate daughter, in an adaptation of Nathaniel Hawthorne's The Scarlet Letter, and as Debbie in Aurand Harris's "A Party for Jonathan".

In 1957, Myers had two featured roles on Broadway; in Arthur Laurents's A Clearing in the Woods—as the youngest of three onstage alter egos of the play's troubled protagonist, Kim Stanley—and the character Clementine in Morton Wishengrad's The Rope Dancers, alongside Siobhan McKenna, Art Carney, Beverly Lunsford, and—as Mrs. Farrow, Clementine's mom—Joan Blondell.

In 1959, Myers played Patsy Gallagher—amidst a supporting cast including Glenda Farrell, Charlie Ruggles, and Marc Connelly—in the CBS TV remake of the 1945 box office hit, with Robert Preston and Claudette Colbert in the Crosby-Bergman roles. Reviewing the film, Daily News critic Kay Gardella, while lukewarm on the production as a whole, made sure to include the supporting cast amongst its redeeming features, Ruggles and Myers, in particular.

In October 1965, Myers portrayed Abishag in the Directions '66 episode, "David and Nathan", costarring Biff McGuire as King David and Lawrence Keith as Nathan the Prophet.

On Sunday morning, May 28, 1967, Myers earned her final screen credit in "New Life to Live", the second in a series of three Pentecost-themed episodes in the religious series, Look Up and Live.

== Personal life ==
In 1966, news of the announcement by Mr. and Mrs. Myers of their daughter's engagement to Mr. Gerald Siegal, formerly of South Carolina, was published in the New York Times. Siegal was a New York-based talent agent—later dubbed by Liz Smith "the flack with a sense of humor"—whose marriage to Myers produced one child, a son born in 1981. As of June 9, 2008 (according to the obituary for Siegal's mother published that day in the Florence Morning News), Gerald and Barbara Siegal were still married and still residing in New York.

== Filmography ==
Year	Title	Director	Role	Notes	Ref.
1953	Lamp Unto My Feet	NA	NA	"A Child Shall Lead Them"	(as Barbara Ellen Myers)
1953	Lamp Unto My Feet	NA	NA	"Just a Little Faith"	(as Barbara Ellen Myers)
1953	Lamp Unto My Feet	NA	NA	"Contraband"	(as Barbara Ellen Myers)
1955	Lamp Unto My Feet	NA	NA	"Dilemma"	(as Barbara Ellen Myers)
1953	Bonino	NA	Angela	Recurring	(as Barbara Ellen Myers)
1954	Mama	NA	NA	"T.R. and the Buttercups"	
1954	Woman with a Past	Marcella Cisney, Byron Kelly	Diane Sherwood	21 episodes	(as Barbara Ellen Myers)
1954	Kraft Theatre	NA	Pearl	"The Scarlet Letter"	
1954	Kraft Theatre	NA	Debbie	"Party for Jonathan"	
1955	Star Tonight	Alan Anderson	NA	"Cross-Words"	
1957	Decoy	Teddy Sills	Bobby	"The Red Clown"	
1959	The Bells of St. Mary's	Tom Donovan	Patsy Gallagher		(as Barbara Ellen Myers)
1959	Children of Strangers	William Ayers	Eve Kroger		
1959	Robert Herridge Theatre	Karl Genus	Pat Dunbar	"The Lottery"	
1963	Armstrong Circle Theatre	Paul Bogart	Gayle	"The Journey of Poh Lin"	
1965	Directions '66	NA	Abishag	"David and Nathan"	
1966	Directions '66	NA	NA	"A Triumph of Memory"	
1967	Look Up and Live	NA	Jennifer	"New Life to Live"	
