= Claudia Muzio =

Italian operatic soprano

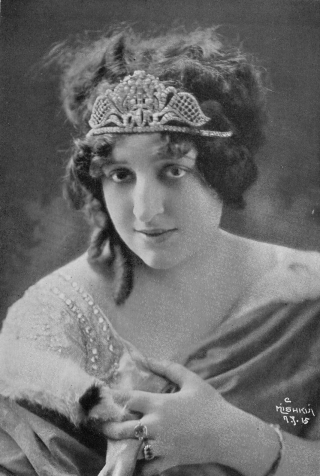
Claudia Muzio

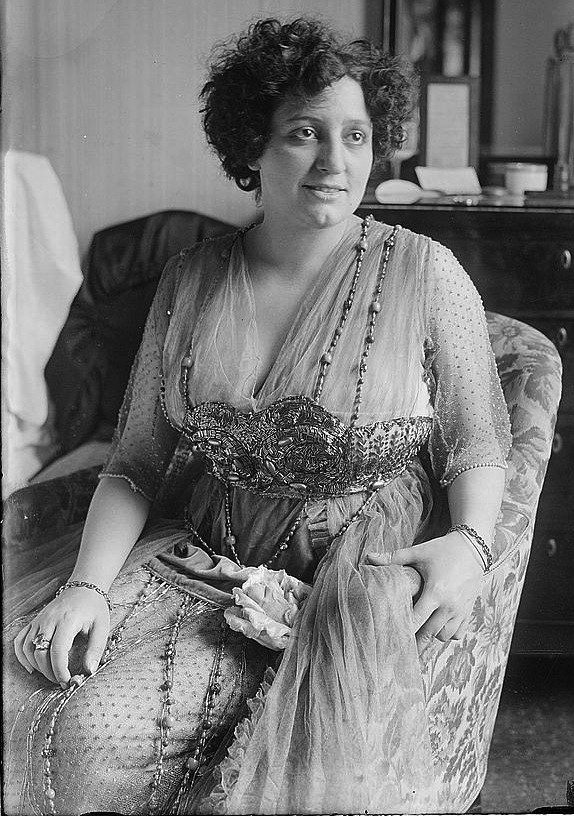
Muzio in 1916

Claudia Muzio (7 February 1889 – 24 May 1936) was an Italian operatic lyric soprano who enjoyed an international career during the early 20th century.

== Early years ==
Claudina Emilia Maria Muzzio was born in Pavia, the daughter of Carlo Alberto Muzzio, an operatic stage manager, whose engagements during her childhood took the family to opera houses around Italy as well as to Covent Garden in London and to the Metropolitan Opera in New York. Her mother was a choir singer, Giovanna Gavirati.

Muzio arrived in London at the age of 2 and went to school there, becoming fluent in English, before returning to Italy at the age of 16 to study in Turin with Annetta Casaloni, a piano teacher and former operatic mezzo-soprano who had created the role of Maddalena in the world première of Verdi's Rigoletto. Muzio then continued her vocal studies in Milan with Elettra Callery-Viviani. She also took the stage name of Claudia Muzio.

== Career ==
Muzio made her operatic début in Arezzo (15 January 1910) in the title role of Massenet's Manon, and made progress in the opera houses of Italy, leading to débuts at La Scala in Milan in 1913 (as Desdemona in Verdi's Otello), in Paris (as Desdemona) and in London at Covent Garden (as Puccini's Manon Lescaut) in 1914. She stayed on in London to sing other roles including Mimì and Tosca (both with Caruso). She was invited to the Met in New York in December 1916 (for Tosca) and was so successful that she continued to appear there during six successive years. It was at the Metropolitan that Muzio created the role of Giorgetta in Il tabarro, in the world première of Puccini's triple bill, Il trittico, on 14 December 1918.

She established a special relationship with audiences at the Teatro Colón in Buenos Aires, where she first appeared in June 1919 (in Catalani's Loreley). From then until 1934 she sang there in 23 different operas, becoming known as "la divina Claudia". Between 1922 and 1932, she appeared regularly in Chicago (after falling out with the management at the New York Met).

On 15 October 1932, she performed the title role of Tosca to inaugurate the new War Memorial Opera House in San Francisco. Other notable roles in her career included the title role in Aida, Santuzza in Cavalleria rusticana, Maddalena in Andrea Chénier, and Leonora in Il trovatore (all in New York), and also Violetta in La traviata and Leonora in La forza del destino (in Chicago and Buenos Aires). Her last and according to some critics her greatest role was in Rome in 1934 as Cecilia in the opera of that name written for her by Licinio Refice. Her most popular role, however, was Violetta, in which she was considered unsurpassed throughout the Latin opera world (Italy, Spain, South America).

Muzio was noted for the beauty and warmth of her voice, with a richness of tonal colouring. Her performances were sometimes criticised for excessive use of dynamic extremes. Critics called her pianissimo singing "particularly admirable." She remained modest and even reclusive despite her increasing fame and wealth.

== Last years ==
In her later years, Muzio experienced some financial anxiety after losing money through the extravagance of her manager and rumoured lover, and then in the stock market crash of 1929. Muzio married Renato Liberati, seventeen years her junior in 1929. The following year she began experiencing some health problems, but continued to sing and record. On May 24, 1936, after a short illness, she died in a hotel in Rome of what was officially described as heart failure, at the age of 47. She is buried in the Cimitero del Verano in Rome. Her goddaughter was the soprano Claudia Pinza Bozzolla, daughter of Italian bass Ezio Pinza.

== Recordings ==
Muzio is represented by recordings from various stages of her career, but few of them are from the period of her greatest successes in the late 1920s and early 1930s. She also recorded primarily for two companies whose distribution was limited and erratic: Pathé and Edison. Muzio's Pathé discs are of mixed quality due to Pathé's problematic recording process – artists recorded to cylinder masters which were then pantographically transferred to disc masters for making stampers, and frequency range loss and distortion often occurred during the cylinder-to-disc processing. Her Edison recordings, however, represent not only some of the best operatic recordings released by that company, but also Muzio's power and ability to project her personal intensity through the difficult acoustic recording process. She was aided at Edison by chief recordist Walter Miller and staff conductor Cesare Sodero.

Mimì's aria "Mi chiamano Mimì"
from Puccini's 1896 opera La bohème (4:01)

Norma's aria "Casta diva"
from Bellini's 1831 opera Norma (4:35)

Tatiana's letter scene from Eugene Onegin
From Tchaikovsky's opera Eugene Onegin, recorded in 1920, at the Metropolitan Opera in New York City (3:54)

- 1911. La voce del padrone. Muzio recorded two arias, including "Mi chiamano Mimì" from La bohème, when she was only 22 and her voice and technique were still relatively immature. [Included on CD transfer Romophone 81005-2.]
- 1917–1918. Pathé. 43 titles recorded. [Transferred to CD on Romophone 81010-2.]
- 1920–1925. Edison. 37 titles recorded. [Transferred to CD by Pearl, GEMM CDS 9072, and also on Romophone 81005-2.]
- 1932. In October, Muzio appeared in the opening production of Tosca at the San Francisco War Memorial Opera House; the opening night was recorded for radio, and act 1 has been issued on CD. [Available on Minerva MN-A76, as part of a collection of Muzio's Puccini performances.]
- 1934–1935. Columbia. Muzio personally produced and financed a set of 26 recordings for Columbia in 1934 and 1935. By 1935, there is some noticeable weakening of the top of her voice but her expressive powers are well-displayed, especially in "Addio del passato" from Verdi's La traviata. They are the recordings by which she has been best remembered. [Transferred to CD on Romophone 81015; 19 titles, along with her 1911 La bohème track, are also on Nimbus NI 7814.]
