= Lenka Peterson =

American actress (1925–2021)

- Born: Betty Ann Isacson; October 16, 1925; Omaha, Nebraska, U.S.
- Died: September 24, 2021 (aged 95); Roxbury, Connecticut, U.S.
- Occupation: Actress
- Years active: 1950–2006
- Spouse: Daniel Patrick O'Connor (1948–2015, his death)
- Children: 5, including Glynnis O'Connor

Lenka Peterson (born Betty Ann Isacson; October 16, 1925 – September 24, 2021) was an American theater, film, and television actress.

== Early years ==
Peterson was born in Omaha, Nebraska, a daughter of Swedish and Hungarian immigrants. Her father was Swedish, and her mother was Hungarian. She majored in drama at the University of Iowa.

== Career ==
Lenka Peterson and Ezio Pinza in Tv serie Bonino, 1953.jpg

Peterson had the role of Corliss Archer in a USO-sponsored troupe that performed on military bases in Japan, the Philippines, and other places in the Pacific. In the mid-1940s, she acted with the Berkshire Playhouse stock theater in New Hampshire. She later acted on stage in Pittsburgh, Pennsylvania; Boston, Massachusetts; and Providence, Rhode Island.

One of the first members admitted to New York City's Actors Studio, Peterson's Broadway portrayals included Ella in Sundown Beach (1948), Maude in The Grass Harp (1952), Kitty in The Time of Your Life (1955), Sally and Mary in All the Way Home (1960), Rose in Nuts (1980), and Sarah in Quilters (1984).

Peterson was nominated for a 1985 Tony Award for Best Featured Actress in a Musical for her role in Quilters. She guest starred in such early television productions as Hallmark Hall of Fame (1952), The Philco Television Playhouse (1955), and Actors Studio (1949 and 1950).

On television, she portrayed Faye Banister on the NBC drama Young Dr. Malone (1958), Martha Skerba on the ABC serial A Time for Us (1964), Doris Bonino on the NBC comedy Bonino (1953) and Eve Morgan on the ABC comedy Love, Sidney (1981) and was a cast member of the series Herb Shriner Time (1951), Search for Tomorrow, playing Isabel Moore in 1962 and Evelyn Reedy in 1977, A Flame in the Wind, Another World as Marie Fenton from 1983 to 1984 and later Lorna Devon's adopted grandmother, and Code of Vengeance. She also played Grandmom in the American Playhouse production of John Updike's story, Pigeon Feathers in 1988.

== Personal life and death ==
On May 8, 1948, Peterson married Daniel O'Connor in Omaha, Nebraska. Peterson was the mother of actress Glynnis O'Connor and Darren O'Connor (and three more children) by O'Connor, who died in 2015.

Peterson died at her home in Roxbury, Connecticut. She was 95.

== Filmography ==
Films
Year	Title	Role	Note
2006	All the King's Men	Savannah Clerk	
2006	Waltzing Anna		
2000	Cheaters	Mrs. Plecki	
1995	Jeffrey	Church Lady 2	
1992	Live Wire	Gwen	
1988	Fatal Judgement	Martha Busek	
1987	Dragnet	Granny Mundy	
1987	Pals	Betty	
1985	Code of Vengeance	Ione Flowers	
1984	Why Me?	Leola Mae's Mother	
1980	Headin' for Broadway	Mrs. Richards	
1980	Seizure: The Story of Kathy Morris	Music Teacher	
1976	Lifeguard	Mrs. Carlson	
1975	Returning Home	Mrs. Parish	
1975	First Ladies Diaries: Rachel Jackson	Mrs. Robards	
1975	The Runaways	Mrs. Wilson	
1975	Someone I Touched	Enid	ABC Movie of the Week
1973	The Werewolf of Washington	Senator Joan	
1973	Duty Bound	Mrs. Brook	
1970	Homer	Mrs. Edwards	
1964	Black Like Me	Lucy Horton	
1961	Special for Women: The Glamour Trap	Housewife	
1955	The Phenix City Story	Mary Jo Patterson	
1951	Take Care of My Little Girl	Ruth Gates	
1950	Panic in the Streets	Jeanette	

Television
Year	Title	Role	Note
2003	Law & Order: Special Victim Unit	Melanie Dunne	Episode: Choice
2000	Wonderland		Episode: 20/20 Hindsight
1992–1996	Law & Order	Ann Schoenberg / Olivia	Episodes: Survivor, Star Struck
1994	The Crosby Mysteries	Louise Taft	Episode: Expert Witness
1992	Civil Wars	Byrdie Davies	Episode: Ocean White with Phone
1988	L.A. Law	Julia Clarent	Episode: Chariots of Meyer
1988	American Playhouse	Grandmom	Episode: Pigeon Feathers
1987	Kate & Allie	Street Woman	Episode: Brother, Can You Spare a Dime?
1986	Hill Street Blues	Marsha	Episode: Suitcase
1986	General Hospital	Edna	
1985	Search for Tomorrow	Grace Blake	
1985	Code of Vengeance	Ione Flowers	
1983	Another World	Marie Fenton	
1981–1982	Love, Sidney	Laurie's Mother	Episodes: Visitors from Smoot, Just Folks
1981	Ryan's Hope	Nurse Grandy	
1977	Quincy M.E.	Amanda Stoddard	Episode: Tissue of Truth
1976	Kingston: Confidential	Laura Frazier	Episode: Frazier
1974–1975	Kojak	Dr. Barbara Kirk / Dr. Kirk	Episodes: I Want to Report a Dream, Cross Your Heart and Hope to Die
1975	The Rookies	Phyllis Wirl	Episode: The Saturday Night Special
1974	Apple's Way	Aunt Carol	Episode: The First Love
1974	Lucas Tanner	Grace Garfield	Episode: Winners and Losers
1965	A Flame in the Wind	Martha Skerba Driscoll	
1963	Look Up and Live	Eleanor Collins	Episode: The End of the Story
1963	The Doctors and the Nurses	Emily Ross	Episode: The Third Generation
1962	The Defenders	Donna Simmons	Episode: The Seven Ghost of Simon Gray
1961	Route 66	Beth Brack	Episode: Burning for Burning
1961	The Ed Sullivan Show	Sally Follet	
1958	Young Dr. Malone	Faye Bannister	Dec. 1958 - Mar 1961; contract role
1957	The Big Story	Edna / Linda Gil / Marie Manning	Episodes: Make Believe Bandit, Desperate Hunger, Exposure
1957	Decoy	Dorothy Boyer	Episode: Scape Goat
1957	True Story	Judy	Episode: Girl in the Hotel
1957	Studio One	Carol Bixby	Episodes: The Goodwill Ambassadors
1956–1957	Robert Montgomery Presents	Nancy Bolen	
1956	The Alcoa Hour	Marilyn	Episode: Finkle's Comet
1952–1955	The Philco Television Playhouse		
1954–1955	Armstrong Circle Theatre		
1954	The Elgin Hour	Marge	Episode: Hearts and Holywood
1954	Ponds Theater	Evelyn	Episode: Guest in the House
1954	Justice		Episode: Man on the Hunt
1954	Suspense		Episode: Once a Killer
1954	Inner Sanctum	Ginny	Episode: The Perfect Kill
1953	Bonino		
1953	The Gulf Playhouse		
1952	Hallmark Hall of Fame	Anne Brontë	Episode: Our Sister Emily
1952	CBS Television Workshop		Episode: Careless Lover
1951	Lights Out		Episode: Beyond the Door
1951	The Web		Episode: The House Guests
1949–1950	Actors Studio		Episode: Joe McSween's Atomic Machine
