= Vivica Genaux =

American coloratura mezzo-soprano (b1969)

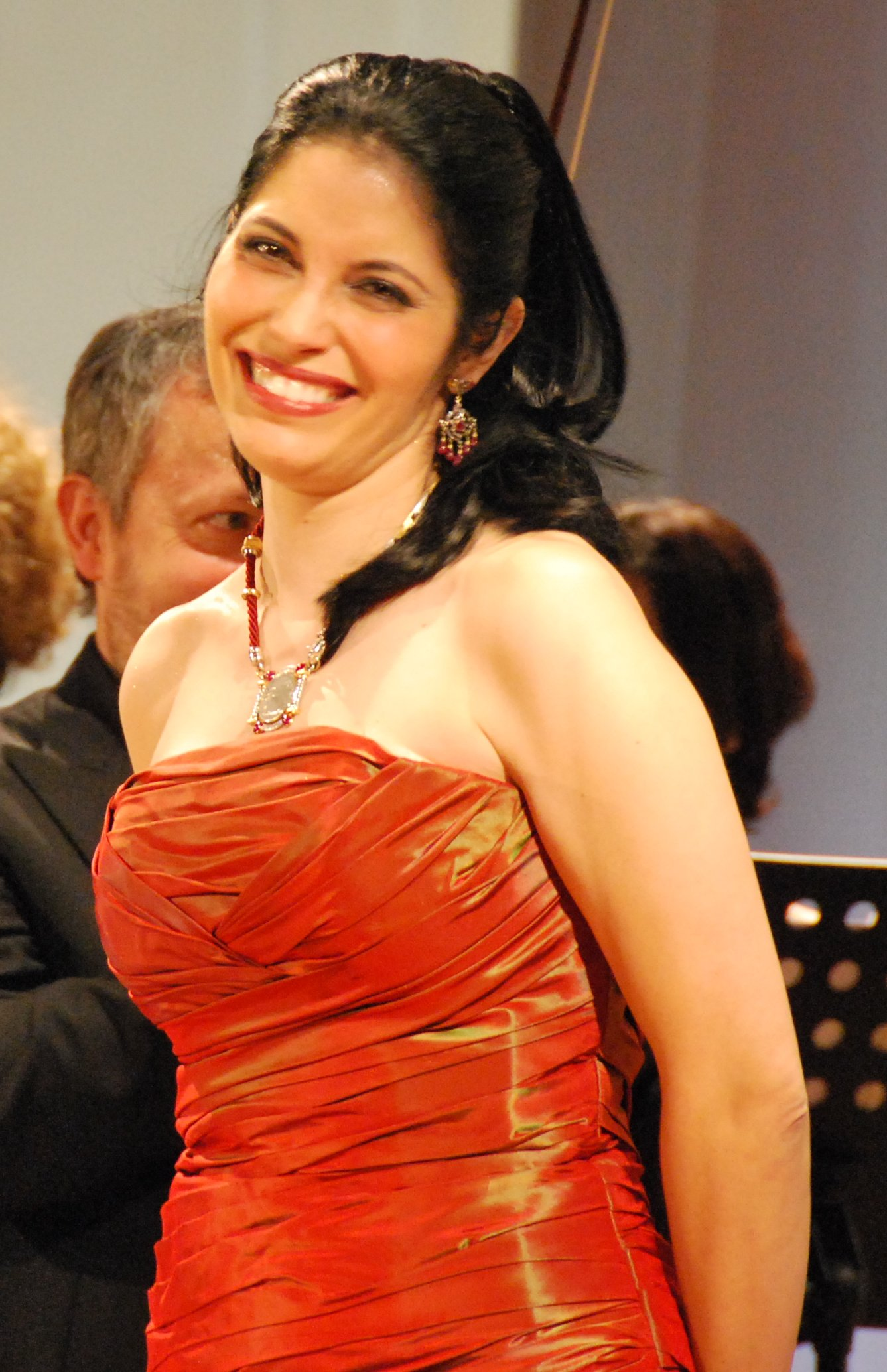
- Vivica Genaux in 2010. Behind her is Fabio Biondi
- Born: July 10, 1969 (age 57); Fairbanks, Alaska, United States
- Occupation: Opera singer (mezzo-soprano)
- Years active: 1994–present
- Website: vivicagenaux.com

Vivica Genaux (pronounced [vi.vi.ka ʒe.no]; born July 10, 1969) is an American coloratura mezzo-soprano. She was born in Fairbanks, Alaska. She has sung in major operas such as The Barber of Seville at the Metropolitan Opera, L'italiana in Algeri at Opéra National de Paris, and La Cenerentola with Dallas Opera and the Bavarian State Opera.

== Education ==
Vivica Genaux was born on July 10, 1969, in Fairbanks. Her father was a biochemistry professor at the University of Alaska Fairbanks and her Mexico-born mother was a language teacher. She began her vocal studies as a young girl with American dramatic soprano Dorothy Dow. She then studied with the late Nicola Rossi-Lemeni and Virginia Zeani at Indiana University Bloomington and for many years with Claudia Pinza Bozzolla (daughter of bass Ezio Pinza) in Pittsburgh.

== Singing career ==
Genaux began her professional career specializing in charming portrayals of Rossini comic heroines (Rosina in Il barbiere di Siviglia, Isabella in L'italiana in Algeri, Angelina in La Cenerentola). She has performed these roles more than two hundred times with many of the major U.S. opera companies (including the Metropolitan, San Francisco, Dallas, Seattle, San Diego, Pittsburgh, and Minnesota Operas), as well as in Paris, Vienna, Berlin, Amsterdam, Dresden, Munich, Montreal, Tel Aviv, Verona, Santiago, and Perth.

Her official debut took place in Florence in October 1994 as Isabella in L'italiana in Algeri.

Her role as the hero in Handel's Arminio was her first baroque role, and she continues to expand her repertoire, which currently includes 28 roles, 20 of which are pants roles and some of which were originally written for the castrato voice.

=== Highlights ===
Prior career highlights have included: Brussels (La Monnaie) and Paris (Champs-Elysées) for Hasse's Marc'Antonio e Cleopatra, led by long-time mentor, conductor René Jacobs; the recently rediscovered Alessandro Scarlatti oratorio La Santissima Trinità in Paris, Palermo and Lyon, which marked her first collaboration with Fabio Biondi and his Europa Galante; Gluck's Orfeo ed Euridice at the Los Angeles Opera; a Weill Hall recital at New York's Carnegie Hall; Rosinas at the Deutsche Staatsoper Berlin, Vienna State Opera and the Metropolitan Opera; the Opéra National de Paris (Barbiere and Alcina); a concert at the Deutsche Staatsoper Berlin with René Jacobs and the Akademie für Alte Musik performing music from their "Arias for Farinelli" CD; Mendelssohn's A Midsummer Night’s Dream in Paris and Hong Kong with Kurt Masur and the Orchestre National de France; Rinaldo in Montpellier and Innsbruck; Minnesota Opera for Lucrezia Borgia, I Capuleti e i Montecchi and Semiramide; Urbain in Les Huguenots for the opening of the new opera house in Bilbao; Hassem in Donizetti's Alahor in Granata in Seville; Selimo in Hasse's Solimano at the Deutsche Staatsoper Berlin; Juno/Ino in Handel's Semele at New York City Opera; and seven appearances at the Caramoor Festival.

== Personal life ==
Vivica is a distant relative of Belgian football player Régis Genaux. Her interest in European Baroque music led her to settle in Venice. She is the subject of 2004 documentary A Voice Out of the Cold.

== Recordings ==
L'Atenaide (Teodosio) – Vivaldi

- with Modo Antiquo & Federico Sardelli, conductor
- NAÏVE OP30438 3 CD
- U.S. Release August 22, 2007

Alahor in Granata - Donizetti

- with Orquestra Ciudad de Granada, Josep Pons, Conductor
- Almaviva ASIN B00003Z9UQ
- Released December 2006

Handel & Hasse Arias & Cantatas (solo)

- with Les Violins du Roy, Bernard Labadie, Conductor
- VIRGIN CLASSICS (1 CD) 7243 5 45737 2 9
- U.S. Release September 2006

Bajazet (Irene) – Vivaldi

- Grammy Nominated
- with Europa Galante, Fabio Biondi, Conductor
- VIRGIN VERITAS 45676-2
- U.S. Release May 2005

La Santissima Trinità (Teologia) – Scarlatti

- with Europa Galante, Fabio Biondi, Conductor
- VIRGIN VERITAS 5456662 (1 CD)
- Released May 2004

Bel Canto Arias (solo) – Donizetti/Rossini

- with Ensemble Orchestral de Paris, John Nelson, Conductor
- VIRGIN CLASSICS 7243 5 45615 2 8
- Released September 2003

Rinaldo (Title Role) – Handel

- with Freiburger Barockorchester, René Jacobs, Conductor
- HARMONIA MUNDI HMC 901796.98
- Released May 2003

Arias for Farinelli (solo) – Various Artists

- Grammy Nominated
- with Akademie für Alte Musik, René Jacobs, Conductor
- HARMONIA MUNDI HMC 901778
- Released 2002

Arminio (Title Role) – Handel

- with Il Complesso Barocco, Alan Curtis, Conductor
- VIRGIN Veritas 5 45461 2
- Released August 2001

An Evening of Arias and Songs (solo) – Various Artists

- EPCASO 93515 04012
- Released June 1999
