= Alahor in Granata =

Opera by Gaetano Donizetti

- Opera by Gaetano Donizetti
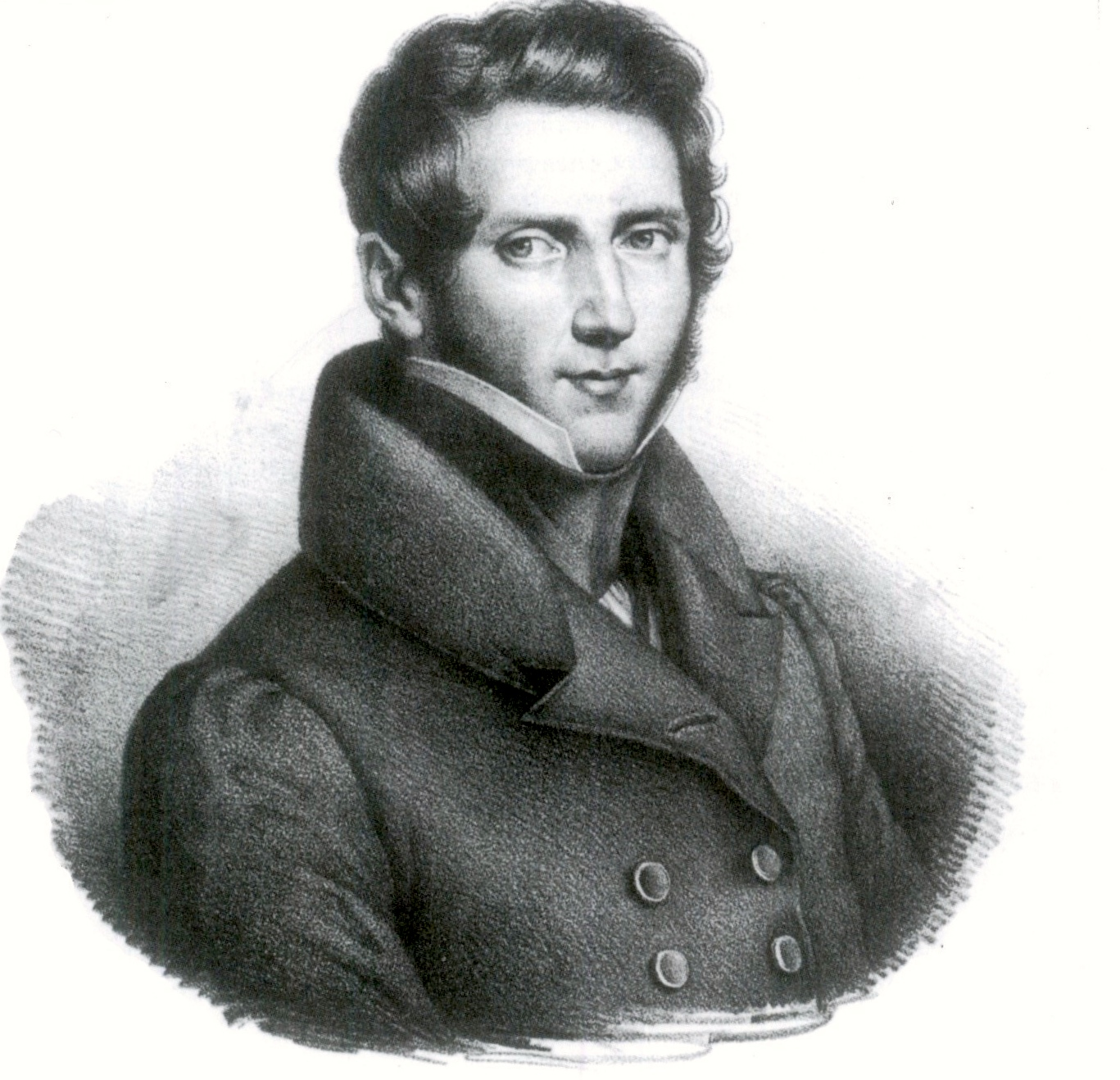
- The young composer
- Librettist: M.A.
- Language: Italian
- Based on: Jean-Pierre Claris de Florian's Gonzalve de Cordoue
- Premiere: 7 January 1826; Teatro Bellini, Palermo

Alahor in Granata is an opera in two acts by Gaetano Donizetti to an anonymous Italian libretto (indicated only with the initials "M.A.") after Jean-Pierre Claris de Florian's text Gonzalve de Cordoue, ou Granade reconquise (1793). However, it seems that the original basis of the libretto goes back to one by Felice Romani written for Meyerbeer in 1821, which in turn can be traced back through another iteration to begin with the de Florian version.

While Donizetti was spending most of 1825/26 in Palermo as musical director of the Teatro Carolino, Alahor in Granata was written to be presented in December 1825, but the premiere was delayed until 7 January 1826 and given at the Teatro Carolino with critical and popular success.

== Performance history ==
The score was eventually lost, but a copy – "not in the composer's hand" – was subsequently discovered in Boston in 1970. Finally, the autograph score came to light a few years later in Palermo. Some of the music was recycled into Emilia di Liverpool in 1828 and L'Elisir d'amore in 1832.

The first contemporary production, in Seville in 1998, has been preserved on DVD.

== Roles ==
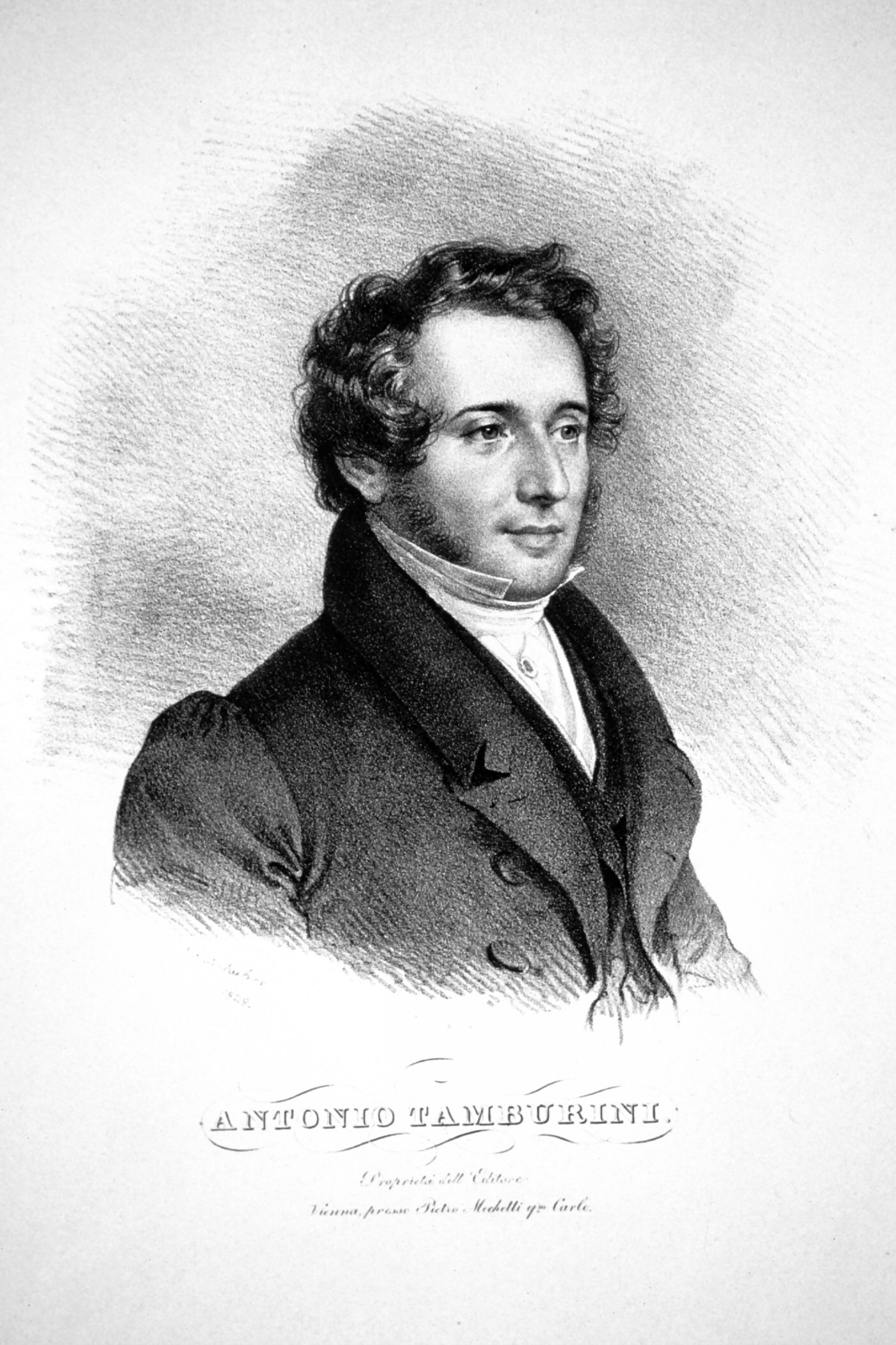
Antonio Tamburini, 1828

Role	Voice type	Premiere cast, 7 January 1826 (Conductor: – )
Zobeida, daughter of Mohamed, sister of Alahor	soprano	Elisabetta Ferron
Alahor, son of Mohamed	baritone	Antonio Tamburini
Muley-Hassem, King of Granata	contralto	Marietta Gioia Tamburini
Sulima, favorite slave of Zobeida	mezzo-soprano	Carlotta Tomassetti
Alamar, head of the tribe	tenor	Berardo Winter
Ismaele, false friend of Alamar	tenor	Salvatore Patti
Tribesmen, soldiers, people

== Synopsis ==
Time: The middle ages
Place: Granada

== Recordings ==
Year	Cast (Alahor, Zobeida, Hassem, Alamar)	Conductor, Opera house and orchestra	Label
1998	Simone Alaimo, Patrizia Pace, Vivica Genaux, Juan Diego Flórez	Josep Pons, Orquesta Ciudad de Granada and Chorus of Teatro de la Maestranza de Sevilla (Recorded at performances in Seville, October)	CD: Almaviva; Cat: DS 0125
