= Decoy (TV series) =

American crime drama (1957–1958)

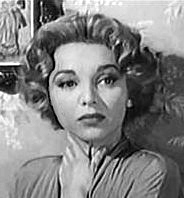
- Beverly Garland as Officer Casey Jones in Decoy (1958)
- Also known as: Decoy Police Woman
- Genre: Crime drama
- Written by: Jerome Coopersmith; Don Ettlinger; Steven Gardner; Abram S. Ginnes; Leon Tokatyan
- Directed by: David Alexander; Michael Gordon; Donald Medford; Stuart Rosenberg; Teddy Sills; Arthur H. Singer
- Starring: Beverly Garland
- Music by: Wladimir Selinsky
- Country of origin: United States
- Original language: English
- No. of seasons: 1
- No. of episodes: 39

Production
- Executive producer: Everett Rosenthal
- Producers: David Alexander; Stuart Rosenberg; Arthur H. Singer
- Cinematography: Maurice Hartzband
- Production company: Official Films

Original release
- Network: Syndication
- Release: October 14, 1957 – July 7, 1958

Decoy (also titled Policewoman Decoy) is an American crime drama television series created for syndication and initially broadcast from October 14, 1957, to July 7, 1958, with 39 black-and-white 30-minute episodes. The series was the first American police series with a female protagonist. Many Decoy episodes are in the public domain.

== Synopsis ==
The series featured Beverly Garland as Patricia "Casey" Jones, a female undercover police officer in New York City. The undercover nature of Jones's work had her impersonating women in a variety of roles, including gangster's molls, prostitutes, nurses, and singers. Jones did not have a partner for her police work, and episodes revealed little about her personal life, with occasional exceptions of references to a love affair with a police officer who died on duty.

Garland's Casey Jones was the only regular character in the series, transferring from department to department to work on each case as needed. No other character appeared in more than one episode. Frank Campanella played a police lieutenant who oversaw Jones' case in three episodes, but each of these three lieutenants had different names, and worked in different police divisions.

== Popularity ==
Decoy was ranked among the top-10 syndicated programs, not only during its initial release, but also "long after production closed down".

== Production ==
Stuart Rosenberg and Don Medford were directors of Decoy, and Steve Gardner was a writer. The show was filmed by Pyramid Productions, partially on location in New York City. Locations included Greenwich Village, the Lower East Side, Randalls Island, and the South Bronx. Studio scenes were filmed in the former Biograph Studios in the Bronx.

Production of the show's pilot began on March 28, 1957, taking seven days for completion. In August 1957, trade publication Billboard reported, "the first-run series is off to one of the fastest sales starts in years, particularly with major station purchases." That sales success included a $600,000 prerelease order from five Westinghouse-owned TV stations and four independent stations.

Production of the series ended on May 29, 1958, because producers lacked the funds to continue. Reruns were broadcast for seven years using the title Police Woman.

== Guest stars ==
- Mason Adams
- Edward Asner
- Martin Balsam
- Barbara Barrie
- Frank Campanella
- Joseph Campanella
- Lonny Chapman
- Albert Dekker
- Peter Falk
- Colleen Dewhurst
- Betty Garde
- Vincent Gardenia
- Bruce Gordon
- Larry Hagman
- Don Hastings
- William Hickey
- Betty Lou Holland
- Arch Johnson
- Diane Ladd
- Zohra Lampert
- Al Lewis
- Joanne Linville
- Ruth McDevitt
- Kay Medford
- Lois Nettleton
- Phyllis Newman
- Simon Oakland
- Tom Pedi
- Leo Penn
- Suzanne Pleshette
- Joanna Roos
- Norman Rose
- Stefan Schnabel
- Frank Silvera
- Lilia Skala
- Frank Sutton
- Michael Tolan
- Betty Walker

== Episodes ==
No.	Title	Directed by	Written by	Original release date
1	"Stranglehold"	Donald Medford	Steven Gardner	October 14, 1957
Casey moves into a seedy rooming house to try to befriend a woman whose former boyfriend was a suspect in a jewel robbery. Guest stars: Joanne Linville, Bruce Gordon, and Arch Johnson.
2	"The Little Red Clown"	Teddy Sills	Leon Tokatyan	October 21, 1957
Casey attempts to locate an artist who has abandoned his young daughter. Guest stars: John McLiam, Barbara Barrie, Barbara Myers, Bill Quinn (as William Quinn), and Anita Stober.
3	"The Phoner"	Teddy Sills	Leon Tokatyan	October 28, 1957
Casey investigates a series of threatening phone calls made to a woman. Guest stars: Frank Sutton, Frank Campanella, and Pat Englund.
4	"To Trap a Thief"	Teddy Sills	Jerome Coopersmith	November 4, 1957
To solve a baffling armed robbery case, Casey assumes the identity of a blackmailer, then acts as an intermediary between the victim and the "perpetrator." Guest stars: Frank Overton, George Mitchell, and Mary James.
5	"Dream Fix"	Teddy Sills	Steven Gardner	November 11, 1957
Casey poses as a nurse in a sanatorium to trace the source of a stream of illegal narcotics. Guest stars: Simon Oakland, Henry Beckman, and Phyllis Newman.
6	"The Savage Payoff"	Teddy Sills	Mel Goldberg	November 18, 1957
Casey is assigned to investigate whether players on a college basketball team are fixing games. Guest stars: John Kellogg, Bill Zuckert, and the Video Ranger Don Hastings.
7	"Deadly Corridor"	Teddy Sills	Leon Tokatyan	November 25, 1957
Casey poses as a prisoner in a women's jail in order to apprehend a murderer. Guest stars: Lois Nettleton, Peggy Feury, and Colleen Dewhurst.
8	"Escape into Danger"	Teddy Sills	Cy Chermak	December 2, 1957
Casey tries to find a woman who has fled believing she murdered her husband. Guest stars: Madeleine Sherwood, John McLiam, and Clifton James.
9	"Necklace of Glass"	Teddy Sills	Dan Ettlinger	December 9, 1957
In order to lure a successful burglar into a trap, Casey poses as a wealthy woman with an expensive jewelry collection. Guest stars: Rita Vale (as Rita Grapel), Edward Holmes, Martin Brooks, and Robert Goodier.
10	"Scape Goat"	Teddy Sills	Abram S. Ginnes	December 16, 1957
A woman, who is in jail for embezzling money to care for her mentally disabled son, escapes. Guest stars: Lenka Peterson, John Connell, and Mel Ruick.
11	"Two Days to Kill"	Stuart Rosenberg	Abram S. Ginnes	December 23, 1957
Casey is assigned to protect a witness to a murder, but the killer manages to track down the women to the hotel room where they are hiding. Guest stars: Diane Ladd and Michael Strong.
12	"Queen of Diamonds"	Teddy Sills	Leon Tokatyan	December 30, 1957
Casey goes undercover as a nightclub photographer. Guest stars: Kay Medford, "Grandpa" Al Lewis, and Richard Ward.
13	"My Brother's Killer"	Stuart Rosenberg	Mel Goldberg	January 6, 1958
Casey is assigned to arrest an escaped convict who has committed numerous hold-ups and murders since breaking out of prison. Guest stars: Sy Travers, Bernard Kates, Barbara Barrie, Leonard Stone, and brothers Frank Campanella and Joseph Campanella.
14	"Bullet of Hate"	Teddy Sills	Don Ettlinger	January 13, 1958
Casey believes a teenage girl's story and attempts to clear her of a murder charge. Guest stars: Alfred Ryder and Joanna Roos.
15	"Death Watch"	Stuart Rosenberg	Abram S. Ginnes	January 20, 1958
Casey stumbles onto a murder-for-hire organization while investigating a shoplifting gang.
16	"Odds Against the Jockey"	Teddy Sills	Steven Gardner	January 27, 1958
In order to get a lead, Casey haunts the race track where a gambler was recently murdered.
17	"Dressed for the Kill"	Stuart Rosenberg	Leon Tokatyan	February 3, 1958
Casey poses as a model to investigate a garment district murder.
18	"An Eye for an Eye"	Teddy Sills	Mel Goldberg	February 10, 1958
Casey pretends to be a drug addict in order to get evidence against a large illegal narcotics ring.
19	"The Challenger"	Stuart Rosenberg	Steven Gardner	February 17, 1958
Casey tries to prevent a mobster from buying an up-and-coming boxer's contract.
20	"Across the World"	Teddy Sills	Cy Chermak	February 24, 1958
When the new owner of an import/export business is murdered, Casey poses as her heir to get evidence against the gun runners who are using the company as a front for their criminal activities.
21	"The Showplace"	David Alexander	Frances Frankel	March 3, 1958
Casey pretends to be a nightclub entertainer in order to investigate a murder.
22	"Reasonable Doubt"	Teddy Sills	Irving Gaynor Neiman	March 10, 1958
A man is falsely accused of robbery.
23	"Night of Fire"	Don Medford	Jerome Coopersmith	March 17, 1958
Casey takes a job as a factory file clerk in order to investigate a suspicious fire. Evidence points to a secretary with a history of mental illness, but Casey suspects that an arson ring may be responsible.
24	"Saturday Lost"	Stuart Rosenberg	Leon Tokatyan	March 24, 1958
During a murder investigation, Casey arrests a drug-addicted young woman who has lost her memory after an all-night pot party.
25	"High Swing"	David Alexander	Don Ettlinger	March 31, 1958
Casey goes undercover to befriend a seemingly benign elderly couple who are actually plotting a series of muggings and robberies.
26	"Earthbound Satellite"	Michael Gordon	Saul Levitt	April 7, 1958
Sonny Van Brock, part of high society, commits suicide after getting in way over his head at an elite gambling salon. Casey goes undercover as a visiting member of Seattle society who loves the roulette wheel, hoping to nail George Courtney, the man running the gaming operation.
27	"The Sound of Tears"	Marc Daniels	Lillian Andrews	April 14, 1958
Ken Morgan is murdered by a woman who clearly had strong feelings for or against him. She unloaded the contents of a revolver into him. Casey goes to work investigating the women in his life: his domineering mother who wouldn't let another female have him; the young woman who's practically a member of their family; and the ex-fiance whom Ken's mother made him give up. Guest star: Suzanne Pleshette.
28	"Ladies' Man"	Stuart Rosenberg	Abram S. Ginnes	April 21, 1958
Posing as an insurance agent, Mike Bergen (Michael Tolan) enlists a naive woman (Lois Nettleton) to take a hidden camera photo of a suspect. The camera turns out to be a gun and the shooting victim is his wife. Casey goes undercover to a hunting lodge in the Catskills to smoke Bergen out into the open. Guest star: Joan Harvey as Maggie.
29	"Cry Revenge"	David Alexander	Abram S. Ginnes	April 28, 1958
Casey gets involved in the lives of a woman and her daughter when they receive a series of threatening phone calls. The situation takes a strange turn when the young woman marries the man who makes the calls.
30	"The Gentle Gun-Man"	Michael Gordon	Mel Goldberg	May 5, 1958
Casey goes undercover to gather evidence against a gang that deals in illegal weapons.
31	"Night Light"	Stuart Rosenberg	Frances Frankel	May 12, 1958
Casey goes undercover to recover a stolen ruby necklace before it can be fenced. Her investigation leads to an ex-convict who is inadvertently leading his teenage son into a life of crime because of the youngster's love for his father.
32	"Fiesta at Midnight"	Michael Gordon	Jerome Coopersmith	May 19, 1958
Newly arrived in New York, a young Puerto Rican man is arrested for robbery and assault. He claims to have been with two women at the time of the theft, but one won't identify him and the other can't be found.
33	"The Lieutenant Had a Son"	David Alexander	Mel Goldberg; Cy Chermak	May 26, 1958
An Army officer is driven to violence by his ex-wife.
34	"Shadow of Van Gogh"	Michael Gordon	Saul Levitt	June 2, 1958
A struggling artist becomes obsessed with Van Gogh, dressing like him and painting like him. When he is innocently coaxed into illegally copying a Van Gogh original, Casey, investigating the sale of the forgery, must find out who hired him.
35	"Tin Pan Payoff"	David Alexander	Steven Gardner	June 9, 1958
Casey investigates the murder of a songwriter.
36	"Blind Date"	Stuart Rosenberg	Nicholas E. Baehr	June 16, 1958
Casey goes on a blind date in hopes of arresting a businessman awaiting the delivery of a large amount of stolen money.
37	"The Come Back"	David Alexander	Don Ettlinger	June 23, 1958
When a roll of blank parimutuel tickets are stolen from a race track, Casey attempts to convince the gang responsible that she's a cop on the take who can help them pass the counterfeit ducats through crooks she's blackmailing.
38	"First Arrest"	Arthur H. Singer	Jerome Coopersmith	June 30, 1958
In a flashback episode, Casey recalls her first arrest, going undercover as an exotic dancer at a carnival sideshow to find a carnival worker who's fencing stolen property.
39	"The Lost Ones"	Arthur H. Singer	Mel Goldberg	July 7, 1958
Casey's visit to a girl she arrested and later befriended takes a turn into the macabre when she discovers the girl's brutal father dead. The girl claims to have shot him, but Casey isn't so sure she believes her.

== DVD releases ==
In 2017, Film Chest Media Group released a DVD set containing all 39 episodes.
