= Woman with a Past =

- Genre: Soap opera
- Written by: Mona Kent
- Directed by: Marcella Cianey
- Starring: Constance Ford; Barbara Myers; Gene Lyons; Geraldine Brooks; Jean Stapleton
- Country of origin: United States
- Original language: English
- No. of seasons: 1

Production
- Producer: Richard Brill
- Camera setup: Multi-camera
- Running time: 15 minutes

Original release
- Network: CBS
- Release: February 1 – July 2, 1954

Woman with a Past is an American daytime soap opera that aired on CBS from February 1, 1954, to July 2, 1954.

The sustaining program originated at WCBS-TV and replaced Action in the Afternoon in the CBS schedule.

== Synopsis ==
The soap focuses on Lynn Sherwood (Constance Ford), a Manhattan dress designer and her tribulations. A couple of months into the show, Lynn opened a dress shop, and the series included fashion shows.

== Cast ==
- Constance Ford as Lynn Sherwood
- Barbara Myers as Diane Sherwood
- Gene Lyons as Steve Rockwell
- Geraldine Brooks as Sylvia Rockwell
- Jean Stapleton as Gwen
- Ann Hegira as Pegs
