= Bonino (TV series) =

1953 American situation comedy series

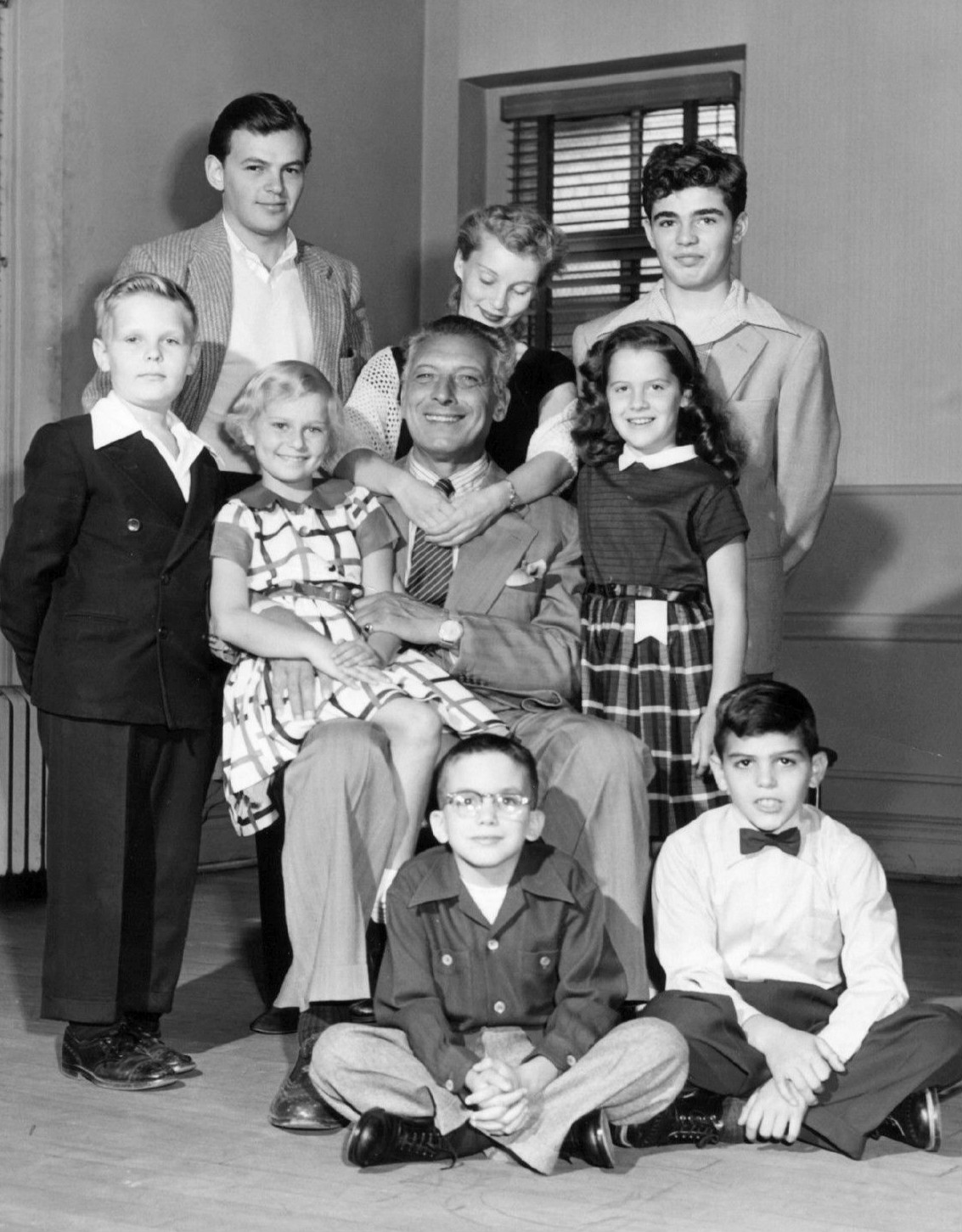
- Cast of the show.
- Also known as: I, Bonino
- Genre: Sitcom
- Created by: Thomas Phipps; Robert Alan Aurthur
- Inspired by: Two for One by Robert Alan Aurthur
- Starring: Ezio Pinza
- Theme music composer: Ezio Pinza; Ardon Cornwell
- Country of origin: United States
- No. of seasons: 1
- No. of episodes: Unknown; no more than 16

Production
- Producer: Fred Coe
- Running time: 30 minutes

Original release
- Network: NBC
- Release: September 12 – December 26, 1953

Bonino is a thirty-minute ethnic situation comedy television series starring Ezio Pinza. Originating in the Hudson Theatre in New York City, the program aired live on NBC from September 12 to December 26, 1953. The show was also known as I, Bonino, an alternate title that many newspapers and columnists used in place of the official name when the series premiered.

The inspiration for the series was a teleplay Robert Alan Aurthur wrote called Two for One, about a middle-aged widower who raises his children from a distance. It had appeared on an early anthology series, Television Playhouse.

== Premise ==
Babbo Bonino (Ezio Pinza) retires as a traveling concert singer, so he can live at home and help raise his eight motherless children. Columnist Erskine Johnson reported that the "Emphasis will be on human interest, situation comedy, and an occasional song".

A storyline concerning the engagement and marriage of oldest daughter Doris Bonino, intended to play out over four months, had to be accelerated when actress Lenka Peterson became pregnant before the show's premiere. (Note: She was much older than her character, and already a married mother with two children.)

== Cast ==
The Bonino household

- Ezio Pinza – Babbo Bonino
- Mary Wickes – Martha (housekeeper)
- Conrad Janis – Edward Bonino (oldest child, doesn't appear until episode 5)
- Lenka Peterson – Doris Bonino (oldest daughter)
- Chet Allen – Pietro "Jerry" Bonino
- Oliver Andes – Carlo Bonino
- Gaye Huston – Fancesca Bonino
- Lucille Graygor, Barbara Myers (as Barbara Ellen Myers) – Angela Bonino,
- Paul Jonali – Michael Bonino
- Van Dyke Parks – Andrew Bonino (youngest child, first appears in episode 4)

Others

- David Opatoshu – Walter Rogers (Bonino's show business manager)
- Mike Kellin – Rusty (Bonino's valet)
- Donald Harris – Took over the role of Rusty on November 18, 1953. (Note: Harris may actually have played a snooty butler in a single episode on November 14, 1953.)
- Anthony Eisley – John Clinton (Note: Eisley most likely portrayed Doris Bonino's fiance, but there is no source to confirm this.)

== Production ==
NBC announced the show would be on its fall schedule, with Pinza starring, in mid-August 1953. The signing of Mary Wickes, Mike Kellin, and David Opatoshu to the cast was reported a few days later. The projected budget for eight children proved expensive enough that producer Fred Coe reportedly considered cutting down the cast. The solution was to turn two of the child characters (portrayed by Lucille Graygor and Paul Jonali) into non-speaking roles, essentially making them "extras" with much lower pay. Only six of Bonino's children would have speaking parts. An additional expense dodge was that the oldest and youngest children, Edward and Andrew, did not appear until episodes 5 and 4 respectively.

Thomas Phipps and Robert Alan Aurthur created Bonino, and Aurthur was the program's writer. Fred Coe was the producer, and Gordon Duff was the director. Donald Voorhees conducted the live orchestra for each episode. The show's theme music was composed by Ezio Pinza and arranged by Ardon Cornwell.

== Response ==
After the premiere aired, Kay Gardella in the New York Daily News said that Pinza acquitted himself well as an actor, while "the first installment, while not brilliant, proved promising". However, columnist Jack O'Brian felt the premiere episode was overburdened with comedy cliches, and that the series would stand or fall on Pinza's personal appeal. Columnist Dwight Newton noted how similar were the first episode premises of Bonino and another new series called Make Room for Daddy; in each case a professional singer decides to stay home with the children he's been neglecting.

== Broadcast history ==
Bonino debuted at 8 p.m. Eastern on Saturday, September 12, 1953, just after Ethel and Albert and before Ted Mack's The Original Amateur Hour. The starting date meant its premiere episode would go against the CBS summer replacement series The Larry Storch Show, giving it a week's grace before the return of The Jackie Gleason Show.

Since the show was broadcast live, stations on the NBC network in the Central and Mountain time zones saw it at 7 p.m. and 6 p.m. respectively. Stations not on the network feed, including those in the Pacific time zone, received a kinescope copy a week later.

Bonino was sponsored by Philip Morris cigarettes and Lady Esther cosmetics. It was replaced by a Spike Jones program.

== Episodes ==
No. overall	No. in season	Title	Directed by	Written by	Original release date
1	1	TBA	Gordon Duff	Robert Alan Aurthur	September 12, 1953
Bonino retires from touring to stay home and deal with family problems. Cast:
1	2	TBA	Gordon Duff	Robert Alan Aurthur	September 19, 1953
Bonino meets the impoverished fiance of daughter Doris, and soon regrets being hostile. Cast:
1	3	TBA	Gordon Duff	Robert Alan Aurthur	September 26, 1953
Bonino insists Martha take a vacation, causing an uproar when she decides to quit instead. (Note: The genesis of this storyline was Mary Wickes being cast in White Christmas. Her character left on vacation and didn't return until the last three episodes.) Cast:
1	4	"The Rebellion of Andy Bonino"	Gordon Duff	Robert Alan Aurthur	October 3, 1953
Bonino's youngest child rebells at having to start school. Cast:
1	5	"Jazz vs. Babbo"	Gordon Duff	Robert Alan Aurthur	October 10, 1953
Trombonist Edward Bonino drives his father crazy with his college Dixieland band. Cast:
1	6	"Rusty's Girl"	Gordon Duff	Robert Alan Aurthur	October 17, 1953
Bonino upsets his valet Rusty by saying his girl Charmaine can't sing. Cast:
1	7	TBA	Gordon Duff	Robert Alan Aurthur	October 24, 1953
Daughter Doris has plans to get married. Cast:
1	8	"Halloween Party"	Gordon Duff	Robert Alan Aurthur	October 31, 1953
A visiting Countess tries to snare Bonino but is stymied by trick-or-treaters. Cast:
1	9	"Doris Marries"	Gordon Duff	Robert Alan Aurthur	November 7, 1953
Emotional Bonino finds equanimity hard to maintain at daughter's wedding. (Note: The character of Doris leaves the show with this episode, returning only for the Christmas episode.) Cast:
1	10	TBA	Gordon Duff	Robert Alan Aurthur	November 14, 1953
Bonino's new butler irks the household with his formality. Cast:
1	11	TBA	Gordon Duff	Robert Alan Aurthur	November 21, 1953
Teenager Jerry Bonino falls in love amidst much teasing from his siblings. Cast:
1	12	"Bonino Goes Duck Hunting"	Gordon Duff	Robert Alan Aurthur	November 28, 1953
Young Carlo Bonino objects to his father killing ducks. Cast:
1	13	TBA	Gordon Duff	Robert Alan Aurthur	December 5, 1953
Two Bonino cousins from Italy think Bonino has become just a pop singer. Cast:
1	14	"Martha Comes Home From Vacation"	Gordon Duff	Robert Alan Aurthur	December 12, 1953
Martha the housekeeper returns from her extended vacation. Cast:
1	15	"The Boninos Celebrate Christmas"	Gordon Duff	Robert Alan Aurthur	December 19, 1953
A largely musical episode with the Bonino family singing carols. Cast:
1	16	"Farewell Party"	Gordon Duff	Robert Alan Aurthur	December 26, 1953
(Final episode) The family gives a farewell party for Edward as he leaves to join the Marines. Cast:
