= Claudia Pinza Bozzolla =

American opera soprano (1925–2017)

- Born: Claudia Tullia Pinza; July 27, 1925; Buenos Aires, Argentina
- Died: August 3, 2017 (aged 92); Pittsburgh, Pennsylvania
- Education: Bologna Conservatory
- Occupations: operatic soprano vocal coach voice teacher
- Years active: 1947–2017
- Parent(s): Ezio Pinza (father); Augusta Cassinelli (mother)

Claudia Pinza Bozzolla (July 27, 1925 – August 3, 2017) was an Argentine-American operatic soprano, vocal coach, and voice teacher of Italian origin. As a singer she performed in operas throughout Italy and the United States, including appearances at La Scala, the Metropolitan Opera, and the San Francisco Opera.

She taught voice for several decades at Duquesne University, the University of Pittsburgh, and Carlow University, and served on the board and vocal coaching staff of the Pittsburgh Opera. Several of her pupils have had successful performance careers of their own, including Metropolitan Opera singers Vivica Genaux and Andrey Nemzer, and Andrew Kurtz, founder of the Center City Opera Theater. She also hosted a weekly radio program Opera with Claudia on WDUQ-FM radio. The only existing recording of the singer is from a November 1951 broadcast of The Bell Telephone Hour in which she performed the final act of Gounod's Faust.

== Life and career ==
Claudia Tullia Pinza was born in Buenos Aires while her father, Italian opera singer Ezio Pinza, was under contract at the Teatro Colón. Her mother was Augusta Cassinelli and her godparents were soprano Claudia Muzio and conductor Tullio Serafin. She spent most of her childhood growing up in the city of Bologna where she studied voice at the Bologna Conservatory. She later was a voice pupil of Antonino Votto in Milan. She made her professional opera debut at La Scala as a Nymph in Claudio Monteverdi's L'Orfeo when she was just 18 years old. She later performed the role of Amore in Gluck's Orfeo ed Euridice at the opera house, and appeared in opera houses in the Italian provinces during World War II.

In January 1947 Pinza gave her first performance in the United States, performing the role of Mimì in Puccini's La bohème with the Philadelphia La Scala Opera Company at the Academy of Music. She sang several more roles with that company over the next two years, including Marguerite in Guonod's Faust and Violetta in Verdi's La traviata. In October 1947 she made her debut at the San Francisco Opera (SFO) as Marguerite with her father portraying Méphistophélès. She subsequently returned to the SFO to perform the role of Donna Elvira in Mozart's Don Giovanni.

In November 1947 she made her debut at the Metropolitan Opera as Micaëla in Bizet's Carmen. She later returned to the Met for other performances as Micaëla and as Mimì in 1948. In 1949 she was a featured performer on The Ed Sullivan Show. In 1950 she performed the role of Polly Peachum in John Gay's The Beggar's Opera in Boston. She continued to perform in operas in the United States up until her retirement from the stage in 1958.

Some of the other companies she performed with were the Central City Opera, the Cincinnati Opera, the Dallas Opera, and the New Orleans Opera.

== Marriages ==
In 1948, Pinza married John Boller who had previously worked for her father.

The marriage ended in divorce six years later. She had two children with Boller: John Hall Boller Jr. and Marina Boller Jones. In 1950 she became a naturalized American citizen.

In 1954 Pinza met Rolando Bozzolla while performing in Italy. The two fell in love and married soon after. They remained married until Claudia's death 63 years later. They had two sons: Samuele and Simone Bozzolla. In 1969 the family moved to Bellevue, Pennsylvania, in order to obtain medical treatment for the couple's youngest son that was only available in the United States.

Soon after, she joined the faculty of Duquesne University where she revived the Duquesne University Opera Workshop and taught voice until her death. She directed opera productions at the university for many years. She taught voice at the University of Pittsburgh (1979–2017) and Carlow University. In 1983 she founded the Ezio Pinza Council for American Singers of Opera which was a five-week intensive summer training program for aspiring American opera singers in Oderzo, Italy. She ran the program for 35 years.

== Death ==
Still active until July 2017, Claudia Pinza died on August 3, 2017, at Allegheny General Hospital, Pittsburgh, Pennsylvania, aged 92, following complications from a series of strokes. She was survived by her husband, Rolando Bozzolla, her four children (from two marriages), and extended family.
