= The Bells of St. Mary's (1959 film) =

- Based on: The Bells of St. Mary's (1945 film) by Leo McCarey
- Written by: Irving Gaynor Neiman
- Directed by: Tom Donovan
- Starring: Claudette Colbert; Marc Connelly; Glenda Farrell; Nancy Marchand; Barbara Myers; Robert Preston; Charles Ruggles
- Country of origin: United States
- Original language: English

Production
- Executive producer: Ronald H. Gilbert
- Producers: Jacqueline Babbin; David Susskind
- Running time: 90 min

Original release
- Network: CBS Television
- Release: October 27, 1959

The Bells of St. Mary's is a 1959 television adaptation of the famous 1945 film. The television version is directed by Tom Donovan, and stars Claudette Colbert and Marc Connelly. The New York Times wrote that while they did not attempt to replicate the original performances, they performed ably.

== Plot ==
This tale revolves around the nuns of St. Mary's convent on a mission to win over a wealthy philanthropist, hoping he will finance the vital repairs needed for their dilapidated and struggling parochial school.

== Cast ==
- Claudette Colbert as Sister Benedict
- Marc Connelly
- Glenda Farrell
- Nancy Marchand as Sister Michael
- Barbara Myers (as Barbara Ellen Myers)
- Robert Preston as Father O'Malley
- Charlie Ruggles
- Horace Bogardus
