= The Bells of St. Mary's =

1945 film by Leo McCarey

- Theatrical release poster
- Directed by: Leo McCarey
- Screenplay by: Dudley Nichols
- Story by: Leo McCarey
- Produced by: Leo McCarey
- Starring: Bing Crosby; Ingrid Bergman; Henry Travers; William Gargan
- Cinematography: George Barnes
- Edited by: Harry Marker
- Music by: Robert Emmett Dolan
- Production company: Rainbow Productions
- Distributed by: RKO Radio Pictures
- Release date: December 6, 1945 (New York City)
- Running time: 126 minutes
- Country: United States
- Language: English
- Budget: $1.3 million
- Box office: $21.3 million (United States)

The Bells of St. Mary's is a 1945 American comedy-drama film produced and directed by Leo McCarey and starring Bing Crosby and Ingrid Bergman. Written by Dudley Nichols and based on a story by McCarey, the film is about a priest and a nun who, despite their good-natured rivalry, try to save their parochial school from being shut down. The character Father O'Malley had been previously portrayed by Crosby in the 1944 film Going My Way, for which he won the Academy Award for Best Actor. The film was produced by Leo McCarey's production company, Rainbow Productions.

== Plot ==
The unconventional Father Charles "Chuck" O'Malley takes over the supervision of St. Mary's parish and its inner-city elementary school run by nuns, led by the strict but kind-hearted Mother superior, Sister Mary Benedict. She explains to Father O'Malley that St. Mary's had to sell the school playground to the grumpy Horace P. Bogardus, a local businessman and the chairman of the city council, to repair the dilapidated school building. The site of their former playground is now a modern building under construction next door to the school, with Sister Benedict hoping that Bogardus will donate the new building to the church.

Father O'Malley meets Bogardus, who warns him that if the church does not sell him the school building to use as a parking lot, he will have the city council condemn it. Father O'Malley is then approached by a Mary Gallagher, who desperately wants to enroll her young daughter Patsy at St. Mary's. Mary recounts that 13 years earlier, her husband, musician Joe Gallagher, left for a gig in Cincinnati shortly after the wedding and never returned, leaving Mary to prostitute herself to support Patsy. The school takes Patsy in as a boarding student, but she struggles with her studies.

Although Father O'Malley and Sister Benedict work together to save the school, their different views and methods occasionally lead to mild disagreements. After a female student accidentally hits a baseball through Bogardus' window while Sister Benedict is teaching her how to swing a baseball bat, Sister Benedict comes over to apologize. As Bogardus takes the sister on a tour of his nearly completed building, she suggests that he donate it to the church, convincing him that his donation would be his great legacy. Later, a stressed Bogardus is advised by his physician, Dr. McKay, to rest.

Father O'Malley visits Mary and brings in Joe, whom he has located. As the couple happily reunites, Patsy arrives to show her graduation dress to Mary, but seeing her mother kiss Joe in the hallway, she assumes that he is a client and flees. When Patsy fails her exams, Father O'Malley tries to convince Sister Benedict to pass the girl anyway, but the sister refuses; despite sympathizing with Patsy, she insists that she must uphold the school's standards. Upon learning that she has failed, Patsy despondently returns her graduation dress.

When Sister Benedict suddenly falls ill, Dr. McKay insists on examining her in his office the next day. As Dr. McKay leaves, he discusses Bogardus' heart condition with Father O'Malley, who suggests that doing good deeds can cure a bad heart. The next day, Father O'Malley encounters Bogardus, who is worried about his heart condition. Encouraged by Father O'Malley to perform good deeds, Bogardus gives a blind beggar money, saves a stray dog from being run over by cars, and helps an elderly woman onto her bus. While praying in a church, Bogardus is approached by Sister Benedict; seeking to abandon his selfish ways, he finally donates his new building to her, much to her delight.

Dr. McKay informs Father O'Malley that Sister Benedict has been diagnosed with early-stage tuberculosis and recommends that she should be temporarily transferred to a dry climate and relieved of her parochial duties. The doctor suggests keeping her condition secret from her to help her maintain a positive attitude, and Father O'Malley reluctantly agrees. As Sister Benedict enthusiastically oversees preparations for the new facility, Father O'Malley notifies her that she is being transferred, leaving her devastated.

On graduation day, Patsy confides in Sister Benedict that she deliberately failed her exams in order to stay another year at St. Mary's. As Father O'Malley introduces Patsy's parents to Sister Benedict, Patsy learns that the man she had seen kissing her mother is actually her father. Patsy and her mother share an emotional embrace, and Sister Benedict allows Patsy to graduate.

After the ceremony, Sister Benedict visits the chapel to pray for guidance. Just before she departs, Father O'Malley reveals her diagnosis to her. Sister Benedict happily thanks Father O'Malley and bids him farewell.

== Cast ==
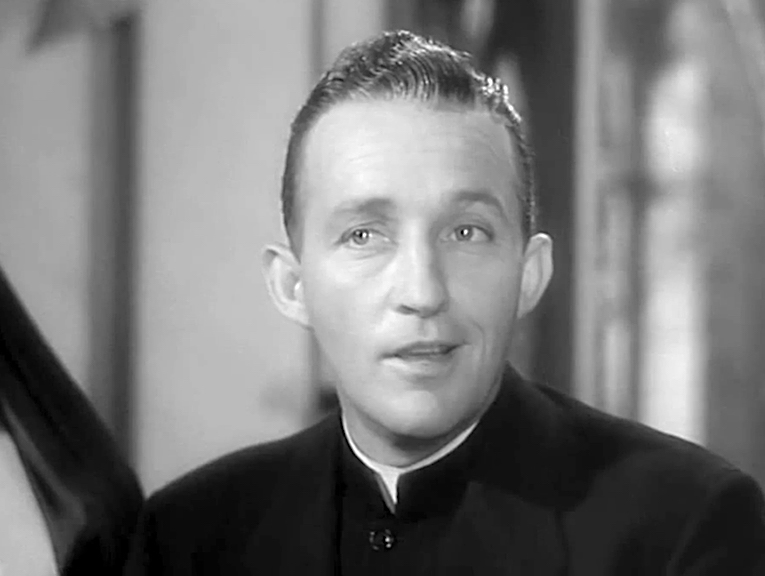
Bing Crosby as Father O'Malley

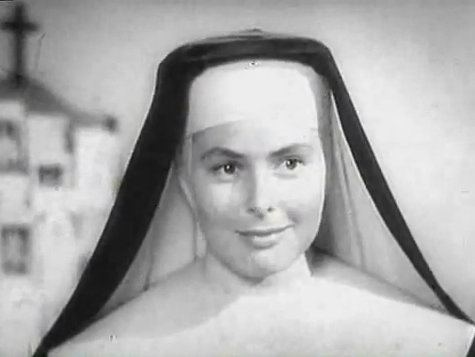
Ingrid Bergman as Sister Benedict

- Bing Crosby as Father Chuck O'Malley
- Ingrid Bergman as Sister Mary Benedict
- Henry Travers as Horace P. Bogardus
- William Gargan as Joe Gallagher
- Ruth Donnelly as Sister Michael
- Joan Carroll as Patricia "Patsy" Gallagher
- Martha Sleeper as Mary Gallagher
- Rhys Williams as Dr. McKay
- Richard Tyler (credited as Dickie Tyler) as Eddie Breen
- Una O'Connor as Mrs. Breen
- Dewey Robinson as pedestrian (uncredited)
- Pietro Sosso as blind man (uncredited)
- Corky, the dog (uncredited)

== Soundtrack ==
- "Aren't You Glad You're You?" (Jimmy Van Heusen / Johnny Burke) sung by Bing Crosby
- "Adeste Fideles" sung by Bing Crosby and children's choir
- "In the Land of Beginning Again" (George W. Meyer / Grant Clarke) sung by Bing Crosby
- "O Sanctissima" sung by Bing Crosby
- "It's Spring" ("Vårvindar friska" in Swedish) sung by Ingrid Bergman
- "The Bells of St. Mary's" sung by Bing Crosby and choir

Bing Crosby recorded four of the songs for Decca Records and these were issued as singles as well as a two-disc 78 rpm album titled Selections from The Bells of St. Mary's. "Aren't You Glad You're You" was in the Billboard charts for nine weeks with a peak position of number 8. "In the Land of Beginning Again" and "The Bells of St. Mary's" both charted briefly also. Crosby's songs were also included in the Bing's Hollywood series.

== Reception ==
=== Box office ===
The Bells of St. Mary's earned receipts of $8 million in North America during its initial run, making it the highest-grossing film of 1945 in the United States.

The film made a profit of $3,715,000, making it the most profitable film in the history of RKO. Adjusted for inflation, it is the 57th highest-grossing film domestically of all time.

=== Critical response ===
On the review aggregator website Rotten Tomatoes, the film holds an approval rating of 85% based on 20 reviews, with an average rating of 7.2/10.

Bosley Crowther of The New York Times felt that the film was too similar to Going My Way, and "although a plenteous and sometimes winning show, lacks the charm of its predecessor—and that comparison cannot be escaped." The reviewer for Variety wrote: "Picture is packed with many simple scenes that tug at the heart and loosen the tears as directed by McCarey and played by the outstanding cast." Harrison's Reports commented: "As in Going My Way, which he also wrote, produced, and directed, Leo McCarey has proved again that great pictures do not require pretentious stories ... The acting of the entire cast is excellent. Crosby delights one with his ease and natural charm, and Miss Bergman will undoubtedly rise to new heights of popularity because of the effective way in which she portrays her role." John McCarten of The New Yorker wrote derisively: "Mr. McCarey seems to view the Roman Catholic Church, which is quite a formidable and venerable organization, as a kind of settlement house where good works and jollity provide a lively substitute for religion ... Everything, of course, turns out quite happily, except, perhaps, for those captious souls who regard religion as an adult matter."

The Bells of St. Mary's placed fourth on The Film Daily's year-end nationwide poll of 559 critics naming the best films of 1946.

=== Accolades ===
At the Academy Awards, it won for Best Sound Recording (Stephen Dunn). It was nominated for Best Picture, Best Actor in a Leading Role (Bing Crosby), Best Actress in a Leading Role (Ingrid Bergman), Best Director, Best Film Editing, Best Music, Scoring of a Dramatic or Comedy Picture, Best Music, Song (for Jimmy Van Heusen (music) and Johnny Burke (lyrics) for "Aren't You Glad You're You").

Bing Crosby's Academy Award nomination for his portrayal of Father Chuck O'Malley made him the first actor in history to receive two nominations for portraying the same character in different films. (He lost to Ray Milland for The Lost Weekend.) This was following the previous year's nomination anomaly, where Barry Fitzgerald received nominations in both supporting and lead for the same film (as the same character), the prequel Going My Way. While he lost in lead to his co-star Crosby, Fitzgerald won for Best Supporting Actor.

== Adaptations ==
- The screenplay was adapted into a novel by George Victor Martin.
- There were two radio adaptations of The Bells of St. Mary's on The Screen Guild Theater radio program. Both starred Bing Crosby and Ingrid Bergman. They were broadcast on August 26, 1946, and October 6, 1947.
- A television adaptation on videotape of The Bells of St. Mary's was shown in 1959, starring Claudette Colbert, Marc Connelly, Glenda Farrell, Nancy Marchand, Barbara Myers, Robert Preston, and Charles Ruggles. It was directed by Tom Donovan.

== Cultural impact ==
The Bells of St. Mary's has come to be associated with the Christmas season, probably because of the inclusion of a scene involving a Christmas pageant at the school, a major plot point involving an unlikely (yet prayed for) gift, and the film's having been released in December 1945.

In the film It's a Wonderful Life (1946), in which Henry Travers, a co-star of The Bells of St. Mary's, plays the guardian angel Clarence Odbody, the title of The Bells of St. Mary's appears on the marquee of a movie theater in Bedford Falls, New York. In The Godfather (1972), Michael and Kay see The Bells of St. Mary's at Radio City Music Hall.

== See also ==
- List of Christmas films
