= Ezio Pinza =

Italian opera singer (1892–1957)

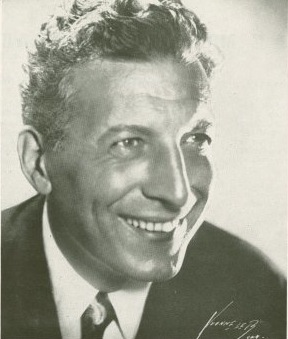
- Pinza, c. 1949
- Born: Ezio Fortunato Pinza; May 18, 1892; Rome, Kingdom of Italy
- Died: May 9, 1957 (aged 64); Stamford, Connecticut, U.S.
- Resting place: Putnam Cemetery
- Education: Conservatorio Giovanni Battista Martini
- Occupations: Opera singer (bass); actor
- Years active: 1914–1956
- Spouse(s): Augusta Cassinelli (?-1940) (divorced) (1 child, Claudia Pinza Bozzolla); Doris Leak (1940-1957) (his death, 3 children)
- Children: 4

Ezio Fortunato Pinza (May 18, 1892 – May 9, 1957) was an Italian opera singer. Pinza possessed a rich, smooth and sonorous voice, with a flexibility unusual for a bass. He spent 22 seasons at New York's Metropolitan Opera, appearing in more than 750 performances of 50 operas. At the San Francisco Opera, Pinza sang 26 roles during 20 seasons from 1927 to 1948. Pinza also sang to great acclaim at La Scala, Milan, and at the Royal Opera House, Covent Garden, London.

After retiring from the Metropolitan Opera in 1948, Pinza enjoyed a fresh career on Broadway in musical theatre, most notably in South Pacific, in which he created the role of Emile de Becque. He was less successful in his appearances in Hollywood films.

== Biography ==
=== Early years ===
Ezio Fortunato Pinza was born in modest circumstances in Rome in 1892. The seventh child born to his parents, he was the first to live past infancy. Pinza grew up on Italy's east coast, in the ancient city of Ravenna. He studied singing at Bologna's Conservatorio Giovanni Battista Martini, making his operatic debut at age 22 in 1914, as Oroveso in Norma at Cremona.

Ezio Pinza (left) jokes with comedian Jimmy Durante as Pinza leaves his imprints at Grauman's Chinese Theater in Los Angeles, 1953.

As a young man, Pinza was a devotee of bicycle racing. "Although I did not know it at the time," he told an interviewer years later, "I was developing the lung power which now makes people hear my voice even in the top row of the peanut gallery." He also undertook four years of military service during World War I, prior to resuming his operatic career in Rome in 1919. He was then invited to sing at Italy's foremost opera house, La Scala, Milan, making his début there in February 1922. At La Scala, under the direction of the brilliant and exacting principal conductor Arturo Toscanini, Pinza's career blossomed during the course of the next few seasons. He became a popular favourite of critics and audiences due to the high quality of his singing and the attractiveness of his stage presence.

Although he attended the Bologna Conservatory, Pinza never learned to read music; he sang all his music by ear. He would listen to his part played on the piano and then sing it accurately. Pinza succeeded the great Italian basses Francesco Navarini and Vittorio Arimondi, both of whom enjoyed international opera careers during the late 19th and early 20th centuries, and Nazzareno De Angelis, who had arrived on the scene in the early 1900s. Another of his eminent predecessors in the Italian operatic repertoire was the Spaniard José Mardones, who had appeared regularly with the Boston and Metropolitan opera companies between 1909 and 1926. Tancredi Pasero, whose vibrant voice sounded remarkably similar to Pinza's, was his chief contemporary rival among Italian-born basses. Pasero, however, lacked Pinza's handsome looks and magnetic personality.

=== Operatic success ===
Ezio Pinza as Mefistofele, Teatro alla Scala, Milan, 1933-1934.

Pinza's Metropolitan Opera debut occurred in November 1926 in Spontini's La vestale, with famed American soprano Rosa Ponselle in the title role. In 1929, he sang Don Giovanni, a role with which he was subsequently to become closely identified. He subsequently added the Mozart roles Figaro (in 1940) and Sarastro (in 1942) to his repertoire, a vast number of Italian operatic roles of Bellini, Donizetti, and Verdi, and Mussorgsky's Boris Godunov (sung in Italian). Apart from the Met, Pinza appeared at the Royal Opera House, Covent Garden, in 1930–1939, and was invited to sing at the Salzburg Festival in 1934–1937 by the celebrated German conductor Bruno Walter.

Pinza sang once again under the baton of Toscanini in 1935, this time with the New York Philharmonic Orchestra, as the bass soloist in performances of Beethoven's Missa Solemnis. One of these performances was broadcast by CBS and preserved on transcription discs; this recording has been issued on LP and CD. He also sang in Toscanini's February 6, 1938, NBC Symphony Orchestra's broadcast performance of Beethoven's Ninth Symphony. These performances both took place in Carnegie Hall. In October 1947, he performed the role of Méphistophélès in Gounod's Faust opposite his daughter, soprano Claudia Pinza Bozzolla, as Marguerite at the San Francisco Opera.

Pinza resigned from the Metropolitan Opera in 1948. He had sung opposite many celebrated singers at the Met during his heyday, including, among others, such international stars as Rosa Ponselle, Amelita Galli-Curci, Elisabeth Rethberg, Maria Jeritza, Giovanni Martinelli, Beniamino Gigli, Lawrence Tibbett, and Giuseppe De Luca. The Metropolitan Opera honored Pinza by dedicating all the water fountains at the new Metropolitan Opera House at Lincoln Center to him. Before his retirement from opera, his repertoire consisted of around 95 roles.

=== Arrest and detention by FBI ===
In March 1942, Pinza was arrested by the FBI at his New York home and was unjustly detained along with hundreds of other Italian-Americans who were suspected of supporting the Axis during the second World War. Pinza spent nearly three months in custody at Ellis Island. Norman Cordon, a basso who was considered one of Pinza's rivals at the Metropolitan Opera, boasted privately that he had informed the FBI that Pinza was a fascist sympathizer. At the time of his detention, Pinza was only four months away from obtaining US citizenship. The incident was extremely traumatic for Pinza, and he suffered from periods of severe depression for years afterward. Despite this, shortly after his release from Ellis Island, Pinza and Cordon performed together at the Met in Don Giovanni, with Pinza in the title role and Cordon as the Commendatore.

=== Later years and death ===
After Pinza's resignation from the Metropolitan Opera in 1948, he embarked on a second career in Broadway musicals. In April 1949, he appeared in Rodgers and Hammerstein's South Pacific, originating the role of French planter Emile de Becque. His highly expressive performance of the hit song "Some Enchanted Evening" transformed Pinza into a matinée idol and a national celebrity. He said: "For 20 years I sang in grand opera and nobody knew me; I sang one night in South Pacific and I can't walk down the street without being mobbed." In 1950, he received a Tony Award for best lead actor in a musical.

Pinza became a member of Westchester Country Club in Rye, New York, and lived in a house adjacent to the fifth golf hole of the South Course. In 1953, he had his own short-lived NBC situation comedy on TV, Bonino. In 1954, he appeared in the Broadway production of Fanny opposite Florence Henderson. On March 28, 1954, Pinza and Henderson were featured in the TV special General Foods 25th Anniversary Show: A Salute to Rodgers and Hammerstein which was broadcast on all four American TV networks of the time.

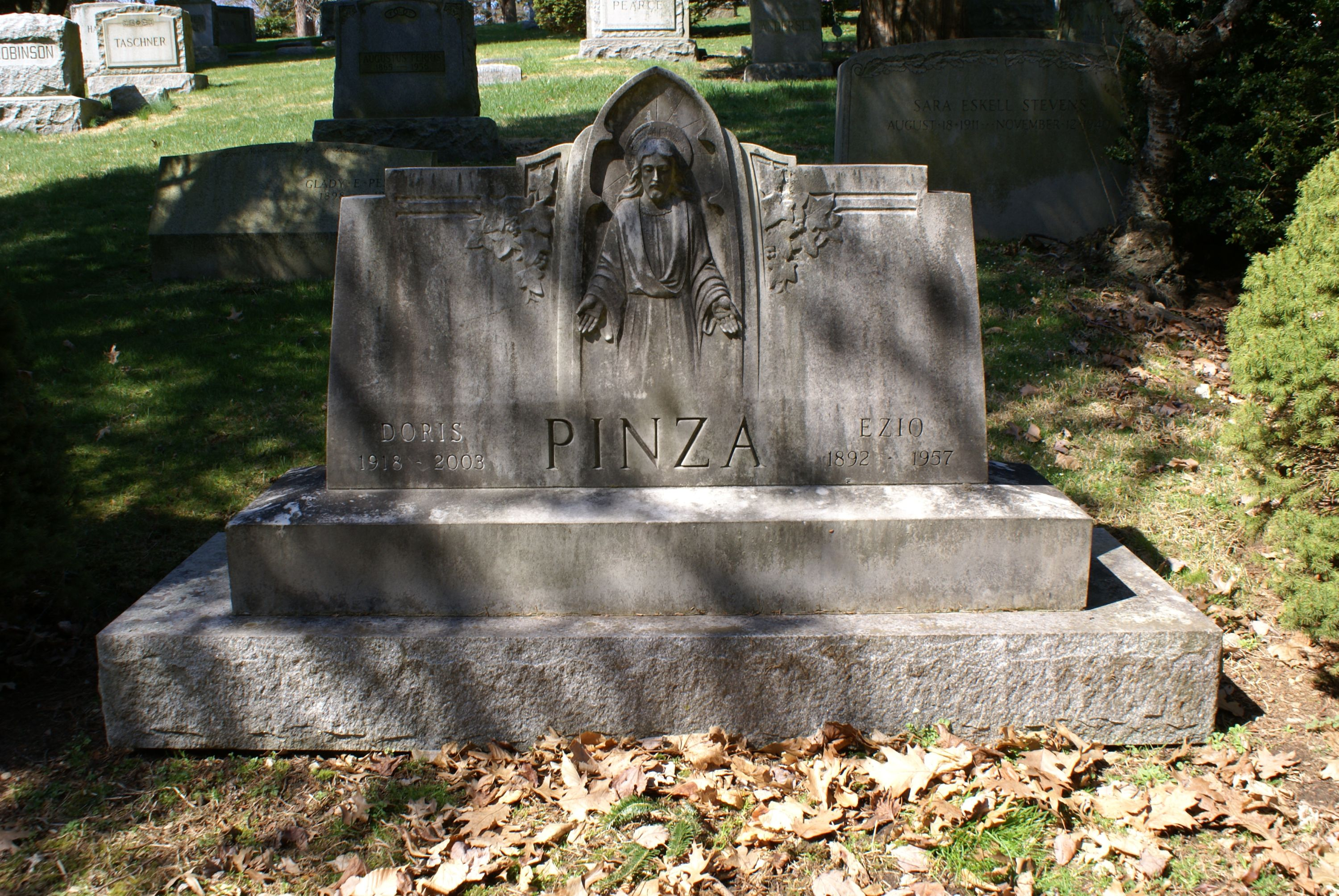
The grave of Ezio Pinza at Putnam Cemetery, in Greenwich, Connecticut, USA

Pinza's health began to decline during the mid-1950s; a series of heart attacks precipitated a stroke on May 1, 1957. Pinza died in his sleep of a heart attack on May 9, at the age of 64 in Stamford, Connecticut. His funeral was held at the Cathedral of St. John the Divine in New York City. He is interred at Putnam Cemetery, in Greenwich, Connecticut. Shortly before his death, Pinza completed his memoirs, which were published in 1958 by Rinehart & Company. Photos taken during his career, as well as images of his family, were included in the book.

=== Personal life ===
Pinza was married twice. With his first wife, Augusta Cassinelli, he had a daughter, Claudia Pinza Bozzolla, who became a celebrated opera singer, vocal coach, and director herself. After divorcing Cassinelli, in 1940 he married Doris Leak, described in The New York Times as "a member of the Metropolitan Opera's corps de ballet." They had three children: Clelia, Pietro, and Gloria. Clelia's daughter, journalist Sarah Goodyear, wrote about her grandfather's wartime struggles in The Village Voice in 2000.

== Films and television ==
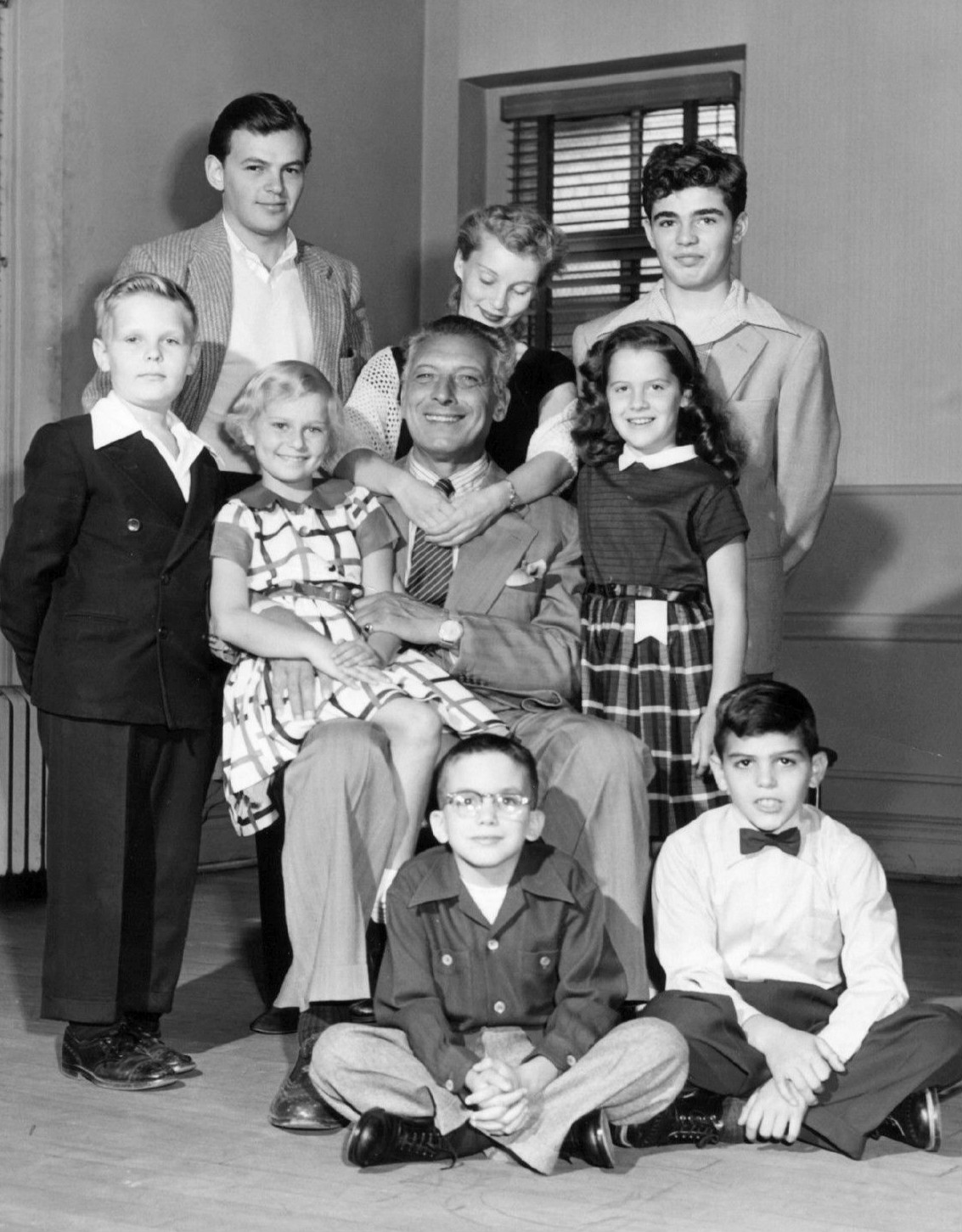
Bonino' s cast in 1953

Pinza appeared in several films, beginning with Carnegie Hall (1947), which featured a number of famous singers, musicians, conductors, and the New York Philharmonic. Following Pinza's Broadway success in South Pacific, he received a film contract with Metro-Goldwyn-Mayer and appeared in two musicals, Mr. Imperium with Lana Turner and Strictly Dishonorable with Janet Leigh, both released in 1951. Both films were poorly received, major box office failures and Pinza's contract with MGM was cancelled. His final big-screen appearance was in the Twentieth Century-Fox film Tonight We Sing (1953), a biography of impresario Sol Hurok. Pinza portrayed the famous Russian bass Feodor Chaliapin and sang a portion of Mussorgsky's Boris Godunov in the original Russian. A recording of Pinza singing "Anema e core" is heard in the film The Blues Brothers (1980), playing on a phonograph in the scene where Jake and Elwood visit landlady, Mrs. Tarantino.

Pinza hosted The RCA Victor Show during 1951–52, which for a time alternated with The RCA Victor Show Starring Dennis Day, later named The Dennis Day Show. In 1953, he starred in the NBC sitcom Bonino. Pinza continued to make appearances on American television until 1955.

== Recordings ==
Pinza recorded extensively for The Gramophone Company/EMI and the Victor Talking Machine Company/RCA Victor during his prime in the 1920s and 1930s. These 78-rpm discs consist largely of individual operatic arias and some ensemble pieces (plus a complete Verdi Requiem conducted by Carlo Sabajno in 1927, and another with Tullio Serafin in 1939). They are prized by music critics and general listeners alike for the exceptional beauty of voice and the fine musicianship that Pinza displays on them. Most of them were reissued on LP, and today they are available on many CD reissues.

During the 1940s, Pinza was under contract with Columbia Records; he was still making operatic recordings, although his voice was now in obvious decline. He also recorded popular songs, and was featured on Columbia's best-selling original cast recording of South Pacific with Mary Martin. Pinza returned to RCA Victor in the early 1950s and recorded several operatic arias and popular songs. Pinza can also be heard on the RCA Victor original cast album of Fanny, recorded in 1954.
