= Rich Conaty =

- Rich Conaty appearing on WFMU's Antique Phonograph Music Program 20 year anniversary show, October 27, 2015
- Born: November 30, 1954
- Died: December 30, 2016 (aged 62); Catskill, New York, U.S.
- Education: Fordham University
- Occupation: Radio personality
- Presenting career
- Show: The Big Broadcast
- Stations: WFUV; WQEW
- Previous shows: Milkman's Matinee; Make Believe Ballroom

Richard Brian Conaty (November 30, 1954 – December 30, 2016) was a New York City disc jockey. He was an important figure in the FM broadcasting of jazz and popular music of the 1920s and 1930s. Conaty is best known for his weekly music radio show The Big Broadcast, which he founded as a freshman at Fordham University in January 1973 and ran for over 2,200 shows over more than forty years.

== Early life ==
Born on November 30, 1954, Conaty was raised in Astoria, Queens. Early in life, Conaty found a box of jazz records in his family's basement and became a fan of the genre.

== Career ==
Conaty's first involvement with radio was in 1971, while he was attending Monsignor McClancy Memorial High School in Queens, New York, when he served as an intern at the Hofstra University radio station, WRHU.

While a freshman at Fordham University, he started The Big Broadcast on the University's FM radio station, WFUV, in January 1972. The show's title is derived from the 1932 film of the same name starring Bing Crosby, who plays a star singer at a radio station. The show featured jazz and popular music recordings from the 1910s through the 1930s. Because he started his show at a young age, Conaty had the chance to meet or interview more than a few artists from the 1910-1939 period, and some became his close friends. These people included Annette Hanshaw, Bob Effros, Edward Eliscu, Ben Selvin, Vet Boswell, Dolly Dawn, Cab Calloway, Connee Boswell, Arthur Tracy, Bill Challis, and Mitchell Parish. Conaty also knew radio personalities Joe Franklin, Floyd Vivino, Danny Stiles, and Phil Schaap. The show ran for over 2,200 shows over a forty years period. In its final form, The Big Broadcast was a four-hour long show that, aside from a variety of recordings, included birthday tributes that featured records of compositions or performances created by artists whose birthday fell during the week of broadcast. Over the years Conaty developed a large record collection which he used as source material. In the course of putting together his program he developed a depth of scholarly knowledge on the music of the period, which was frequently displayed on air. Conaty often highlighted once-popular artists who have dropped into obscurity. The program was also a showplace for his humor, often self-deprecating.

In 1983, Conaty was hired by program director Jim Lowe at WNEW-AM, a station which at that time featured a pop-standards format, and which was home to well-known DJs specializing in that sort of music, from whom Conaty was able to learn. For a time he hosted Milkman's Matinee, a show that had been on for decades. In the early 1980s, he got a chance to fill in, briefly, as host of Make Believe Ballroom, a show that had previously been hosted by the legendary William B. Williams. When WNEW-AM changed format, WQEW attempted fill the market niche on the New York radio dial playing pop standards, and Conaty moved The Big Broadcast and his Saturday program, The Big Bandstand, from WFUV to WQEW in December 1992. By the late 1990s it was evident that WQEW would also abandon the format, and in 1998 the station became Radio Disney. In July 1997, Conaty brought his shows back to WFUV.

The Big Broadcast aired in reruns on WFUV during his illness, and for about six months after Conaty's death. The old shows have been archived on the Fordham University Library web site, where they can be listened to by the public.

Rich Conaty was a longtime friend of Vince Giordano, and Conaty played an important role in the founding of Giordano's band, the Nighthawks Orchestra. Conaty was originally the band's frontman, and Conaty and Giordano were for a time partners in the band.

Starting in 2006, Conaty compiled and annotated a series of collections of 1920s and 1930s jazz. Like the show, these were titled The Big Broadcast. There were 12 volumes, released annually in the spring. The final CD was released posthumously, with the selection of tracks made by Conaty, while the track annotations were written by friends, colleagues and fellow 78 rpm record collectors. As of 2021 CDs and mp3s are still available for purchase from Rivermont Records. Aside from being offered for sale by Rivermont, they were used as membership gifts for listeners joining WFUV.

== Death ==
Conaty died of lymphoma on December 30, 2016, at the age of 62 in Catskill, New York.

== Personal life ==
Conaty was married to Mary (née Hayes); they had no children and later divorced, and she died in 2009. He nicknamed his wife "Manhattan Mary", a reference to a 1927 show of the same name and its title song. At the end of his life Conaty lived in Hudson, New York in New York State's Hudson Valley. He was known in the area for his 1950 Nash Ambassador. Aside from his radio show, Conaty worked as a driver of a bus for adults with disabilities.
