= At the Supper Club Part III =

At the Supper Club Part III may refer to:

- At the Supper Club Part III (Perry Como album)
- At the Supper Club Part III (Jo Stafford album)
