= On the Radio – The Perry Como Shows 1943 =

On The Radio- The Perry Como Shows 1943

Compilation album by Perry Como
- Released: November 10, 2009
- Recorded: 1943
- Genre: Vocal
- Label: On the Air

Perry Como chronology
Perry Como's Christmas Concert (1994)	'''On The Radio- The Perry Como Shows 1943''' (2009)	At the Supper Club (2010)

After Perry Como left the Ted Weems Orchestra in late 1942, he returned to his home in Canonsburg, Pennsylvania with the idea of going back to his barbering profession. Como had many offers before and after he was back in his home town. As he was preparing to sign a lease to re-open a barber shop, he received a telephone call from Tommy Rockwell, who was with General Artists Corporation. Rockwell, who also represented Ted Weems, offered Como a sustaining (non-sponsored) radio program on CBS and also to get him a recording contract. The offers made by Rockwell meant remaining in New York to perform with no more road tours as had been the case for many years when Como was with both Freddie Carlone and Ted Weems. On the advice of his wife, Roselle, Como agreed to go to New York as it meant he could continue working in the music business and not be separated from his family.

Como began his Columbia Presents Como radio show on March 12, 1943. The fifteen-minute program aired on CBS every weekday afternoon. Shortly after he went on the air with this show, he was offered an engagement at New York's Copacabana night club; one week later, he signed a recording contract with RCA Victor. Como continued with the CBS radio program until he was offered the opportunity to have his own sponsored evening radio program on NBC, The Chesterfield Supper Club, which he moved to on December 11, 1944.

When Como went on the air for CBS, the 1942–44 musicians' strike was in full force. The strike by union musicians was meant to force the record companies into paying royalties to their members. Union musicians were able to play live engagements and for radio programs, but not for any recordings until the strike was settled. Record companies used background vocal groups during this time to replace the striking musicians on studio recordings. The only exception to the ban was made for V-Discs after October 27, 1943, which were distributed to the Armed Forces. During this time, vocalists could only be heard with full orchestral backing in a concert setting or on radio broadcasts.

Como's first recording for RCA Victor, "Goodbye Sue", was recorded three months after he began his radio program. Because of the strike, it was recorded without the use of studio musicians. A version of the song with full musical accompaniment was not recorded until 1944 for the V-Disc program. Como performed the song on his Columbia Presents Como radio program with the backing of the Raymond Scott Orchestra and it is one of the selections in this box set. As is the case with compilation albums produced from broadcast transcripts, there is also the opportunity to hear the singer perform many songs which he or she never recorded otherwise.

The recordings on this 3 disk box set are taken from transcripts of Como's radio programs for CBS in 1943. On the Air originally issued these disks individually in 1996 under the titles The Perry Como Shows-1943: Volume 1, The Perry Como Shows-1943: Volume 2, and The Perry Como Shows-1943: Volume 3. Como is heard throughout with the Raymond Scott Orchestra; the orchestra also has some instrumental tracks in the collection.

== Track listing ==
^ Instrumental by the Raymond Scott Orchestra

=== The Perry Como Shows-1943: Volume 1 ===
1. Introduction & Theme Song "For a Little While"
2. "Take It From There"
3. "My Melancholy Baby"
4. "People Will Say We're in Love" ^
5. "More Than Ever"
6. "Comin' In On a Wing and a Prayer"
7. "I Wonder What's Become of Sally"
8. "Tijuana" ^
9. "The Right Kind of Love"
10. "Masquerade"
11. "There'll Soon Be a Rainbow"
12. "S'posin'"
13. "Christmas Night In Harlem" ^
14. "A Journey To a Star"
15. "I Don't Believe In Rumors"
16. "Don't Blame Me"
17. "In My Dream of Tomorrow"
18. "Just Friends"
19. "Never a Day Goes By"
20. "Scrap Your Fat" ^
21. "Close To You"
22. Sign Off & Theme Song "For a Little While"

=== The Perry Como Shows-1943: Volume 2 ===
1. Introduction & Theme Song "For a Little While"
2. "Do I Know What I'm Doing?"
3. "More Than You Know"
4. "Now We Know"
5. "For a Little While"
6. "My Blue Heaven" ^
7. "Goodbye Sue"
8. "Girl of My Dreams"
9. "I Have Faith"
10. "I Heard You Cried Last Night ( And So Did I )"
11. "Don't Get Around Much Anymore"
12. "Hit the Road to Dreamland" ^
13. "As Time Goes By"
14. "I'm Thinking Tonight of My Blue Eyes"
15. "Temptation"
16. "My Ideal"
17. "You Took Advantage of Me" ^
18. "It's Always You"
19. "For Me and My Gal"
20. "Take Me In Your Arms"
21. "Johnny Zero" ^
22. "You'd Be So Nice to Come Home To"
23. Sign Off & Theme Song "For a Little While"

=== The Perry Como Shows-1943: Volume 3 ===
1. Introduction & Theme Song "For a Little While"
2. "Thank Your Lucky Stars"
3. "Lazy Bones"
4. "No Love, No Nothin'"
5. "Paper Doll"
6. "The Beard" ^
7. "I've Had This Feeling Before ( But Never Like This )"
8. "Put Your Arms Around Me Honey"
9. "It's Breaking My Heart To Keep Away From You"
10. "627 South" ^
11. "I'll Be Home for Christmas"
12. "All or Nothing at All"
13. "Violins Were Playing"
14. "I Lost My Sugar in Salt Lake City"
15. "In An Eighteenth Century Drawing Room" ^
16. "You'll Never Know"
17. "If That's The Way You Want It Baby"
18. "I Kiss Your Hand, Madame"
19. "In The Blue of Evening"
20. "Shine On, Harvest Moon" ^
21. "Secretly"
22. "Heavenly Music"
23. Sign Off & Theme Song "For a Little While"
