= At the Supper Club Part II =

Compilation album by Perry Como
- Released: March 15, 2011
- Recorded: 1946–1947
- Genre: Vocal
- Label: Sounds of Yesteryear

Perry Como chronology
At the Supper Club (2010)	At the Supper Club Part II (2011)	At the Supper Club Part III (2011)

This compact disk was created from transcriptions of The Chesterfield Supper Club recorded for the Armed Forces Radio Service (AFRS). Others featured on the broadcasts are Lloyd Shaffer and his Orchestra, Helen Carroll and the Satisfiers, and announcer Martin Block. Guests are Carmen Cavallaro, Carmen Miranda and The Mills Brothers.

== Track listing ==
1. Introduction
2. "How Soon (Will I Be Seeing You)"
3. "Walkin' with My Honey (Soon, Soon, Soon)"
4. "Rosemary"
5. "Waitin' for the Train To Come In"
6. "Dark Eyes"
7. "It's Never Too Late To Pray"
8. "Did You Ever Get That Feeling in the Moonlight"
9. "Till the End of Time"
10. "Song of Songs"
11. "Symphony"
12. "I Can't Begin to Tell You"
13. "In the Middle of May"
14. "A Prisoner of Love"
15. "It's the Talk of the Town"
16. "All the Things You Are"
17. "Begin the Beguine"
18. "Falling in Love with Love"
19. "Momma Never Told Me"
20. "Chico Chico from Puerto Rico"
21. "All Through the Day"
22. "I Wonder Who's Kissing Her Now"
23. "Come To Baby, Do"
24. "Doctor, Lawyer, Indian Chief"
