= Joe Franklin =

American radio and television host, author, and actor (1926–2015)

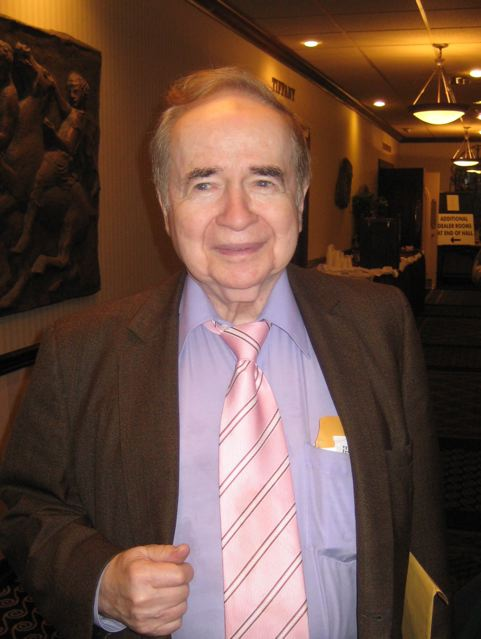
- Franklin in 2007
- Born: Joseph Fortgang; March 9, 1926; The Bronx, New York, U.S.
- Died: January 24, 2015 (aged 88); Manhattan, New York, U.S.
- Education: Columbia University (dropped out)
- Occupation: Television and radio personality
- Known for: Inventing the talk show format
- Children: 1

Joe Franklin (March 9, 1926 – January 24, 2015), born Joseph Fortgang, was an American radio and television host personality, author and actor from New York City. Franklin is noted for having the first talk show and inventing the format. His television series debuted in January 1951 on WJZ-TV (later WABC-TV), moving to WOR-TV (later WWOR-TV) in 1962, remaining there until 1993, one of the longest running uninterrupted careers in broadcasting history.

== Early life ==
Franklin was born Joseph Fortgang on March 9, 1926, in The Bronx, New York, the elder of two children, to Austrian Jewish parents, Anna (Heller) and Martin Fortgang. He acknowledged in his memoirs, Up Late With Joe Franklin, (which was written with R. J. Marx), that his press materials had long said, purposely, that he had been born in 1928, but he planned to come clean about his real birth date. As a teenager, Franklin "followed around" Al Jolson and Eddie Cantor, the latter of whom eventually began buying jokes from the young Franklin and whose Carnegie Hall show he later produced. At age 18, Franklin was drafted into the United States Army, serving in World War II.

== Career ==
At 14, Franklin began writing skits for The Kate Smith Hour; and at 16, Franklin officially began his entertainment career as a record picker on radio sensation Martin Block's Make Believe Ballroom where he became known as "The Young Wreck with the Old Records". By the time he was 21, he embarked on a radio career. He was also considered to be an authority on popular culture of the first half of the 20th century, including silent films. He was called "The King of Nostalgia" and "The Wizard of Was" for focusing on old-time show-business personalities. Franklin was also a pioneer in promoting products such as Hoffman Beverages and Canada Dry ginger ale on the air. A&E's documentary It's Only Talk, The Real Story of America's Talk Shows credits Franklin as the creator of the television talk show. Franklin was listed in the Guinness World Records as the longest running continuous on-air TV talk show host, more than a decade longer than Johnny Carson's run.

In 1999, Franklin partnered with Producer Steve Garrin and Restaurant Mogul Dennis Riese to open Joe Franklin's Memory Lane Restaurant on West 45th Street in Broadway's theater district. After the restaurant closed in 2003 it reopened the following year as "Joe Franklin's Comedy Club" on West 50th Street. Many name comedians came to the club and performed on stage to break in their new material, and many aspiring comics got their first stage time there. It closed in 2005.

After retiring from his television show, Franklin concentrated on his overnight radio show, playing old records on WOR-AM on Saturday evenings and mentoring aspiring entertainers who sought an audience with him at his Times Square office. Franklin's celebrity interviews, known as "Nostalgia Moments", appeared daily on the Bloomberg Radio Network until mid-January 2015, shortly before his death.

== Famous guests ==
Franklin's guests included a mix of celebrities and low-level performers, sometimes on the same panel. He claimed to have had Charlie Chaplin on his program, a dubious statement since Chaplin left the United States in 1952, shortly after Franklin's TV debut. Franklin took credit for discovering or giving early exposure to Al Pacino, Bette Midler, Barbra Streisand, Michael Jackson, Garth Brooks and Woody Allen. He interviewed Andy Warhol and Howard Stern, William F. Buckley and Abbie Hoffman, Jack LaLanne and Muhammad Ali, Fred Astaire and John Wayne.

Other guest claims include Judy Garland, Marilyn Monroe (with whom Franklin co-authored "The Marilyn Monroe Story" in 1953), Jayne Mansfield, The Beastie Boys, Cary Grant, Sam Levene, Lena Horne, Tony Bennett, Salvador Dalí, Rudy Vallee, Jimmy Durante, Madonna, John Lennon and Yoko Ono, Bing Crosby, Jerry Lewis, Roger Williams, The Belmonts, Elvis Presley, The Ramones, Lou Albano, Anita O'Day, and five U.S. presidents (including John F. Kennedy and Richard Nixon). As with the Chaplin claim, some of these appearances were unable to be independently confirmed based on a lack of evidence, since still pictures taken on the set do not exist for several of the people listed, and little video from before the 1970s survives. Bette Midler was the show's in-house singer for a time, and Barry Manilow her accompanist. Elizabeth Joyce was his in-house psychic/astrologer. Franklin never employed a co-host, but his producer, Richie Ornstein, was a standard feature on the Joe Franklin Show who interacted with guests and discussed trivia.

Woody Allen, Andy Kaufman, Liza Minnelli, Barbra Streisand, Julia Roberts, Bruce Springsteen, Robin Williams, John Belushi, Richard Pryor, and They Might Be Giants got their first television exposures on The Joe Franklin Show. Frank Sinatra reportedly appeared four times. Franklin frequently appeared at his restaurant, where he conducted live, in-person interviews with entertainers such as Carol Channing, Anita O'Day and Billy Crystal, who impersonated Franklin on Saturday Night Live.

== In media ==
Franklin appeared as himself in such New York-based films as Ghostbusters, Broadway Danny Rose, and 29th Street. Franklin appeared on the first episode of This American Life giving host Ira Glass advice on how to have a successful show. He was also a guest on (4th) an early episode of Space Ghost Coast to Coast. He also made appearances in various works by New York low-budget film company Troma Entertainment, making a cameo as himself in their 1999 meta-fictional slasher film Terror Firmer, as well as the 1993 infomercial The Troma System as the result of the commercial's host transforming into "the ultimate talk show host". Franklin appeared as himself in comedian Tracey Ullman’s 1993 HBO comedy special Tracey Ullman Takes on New York, interviewing character Linda Granger on his talk show.

Franklin's show was first parodied by Billy Crystal during the 1984–1985 season of Saturday Night Live.

On the locally produced program The Uncle Floyd Show, host Floyd Vivino parodied Franklin as "Joe Frankfurter".

In 1997, Franklin was profiled in the documentary film 50,000,000 Joe Franklin Fans Can't Be Wrong (1997), directed by Joshua Brown.

Also in 1997, Franklin was satirized by Drew Friedman in * Any Similarity to Persons Living or Dead is Purely Coincidental (with Josh Alan Friedman) (Fantagraphics Books, 1997)

Franklin appears in the 2005 documentary The Aristocrats, an anthology of absurdly crude humor.

In 2014, Franklin starred in Owen Kline and Andrew Lampert's comedic short film Jazzy for Joe, which featured Franklin raising an abandoned baby discovered on his doorstep. The film was programmed by Robert Downey Sr. and run as the finale of a 2014 retrospective of his own filmography at the late West Hollywood theater Cinefamily.

== Personal life ==
Franklin married Lois Meriden, a one-time performer with Sally Rand's burlesque-style "fan dancers". They had a son, Bradley. Later, Franklin's longtime companion was Jodi Fritz.

Franklin died of prostate cancer at a Manhattan hospice on January 24, 2015, aged 88.

== Selected books ==
- 1953 The Marilyn Monroe Story, R. Field Company; Greenberg.
- 1959 Classics of the Silent Screen: A Pictorial Treasury, The Citadel press (reprinted in 2013 by Literary Licensing, LLC); attributed to Franklin but actually written by noted film historian William K. Everson
- 1974 Joe Franklin's Memory Lane Cookbook, Lion Books, ISBN 9780874602425
- 1978 A Gift for People, M. Evans Company, ISBN 0-87131-244-1
- 1980 Joe Franklin's Awfully Corny Joke Book, Chelsea House Publishers, ISBN 9780877541424
- 1981 Seventy Years of Great Film Comedians: A Joe Franklin Memory Lane Scrapbook, Global Communications, ISBN 9780938294061
- 1985 Joe Franklin's Encyclopedia of Comedians, Bell Pub. Co., ISBN 9780517467657
- 1992 Joe Franklin's Movie Trivia, Hastings House, ISBN 9780803893481
- 2001 Up Late with Joe Franklin, Scribner, ISBN 978-0-02-540775-6
- 2012 The Marilyn Monroe Story: The Intimate Inside Story of Hollywood's Hottest Glamour Girl., Campfire Network, ISBN 1475004141.
