= 1942–1944 musicians' strike =

On August 1, 1942, the American Federation of Musicians, at the instigation of union president James C. Petrillo, began a strike against the major American record companies because of disagreements over royalty payments. Beginning on midnight, July 31, 1942, no union musician could make commercial recordings for any commercial record company. That meant that a union musician was allowed to participate on radio programs and other kinds of musical entertainment, but not in a recording session. The 1942–1944 musicians' strike remains the longest strike in entertainment history.

The strike did not affect musicians performing on live radio shows, in concerts, or, after October 27, 1943, on special recordings made by the record companies for V-Discs for distribution to the armed forces fighting World War II, because V-Discs were not available for sale to the general public. However, the union did frequently threaten to withdraw musicians from the radio networks to punish individual network affiliates who were deemed "unfair" for violating the union's policy on recording network shows for repeat broadcasts.

The strike had a major impact on the American musical scene. At the time, union bands dominated popular music; after the strike, and partly as a result of it, big bands began to decline and vocalists began to dominate popular music.

== Background to the strike ==
Petrillo had long publicly maintained that recording companies should pay royalties. As head of the Chicago local chapter of the union in 1937 he had organized a strike there. Petrillo was elected president of the American Federation of Musicians in 1940.

When Petrillo announced that the recording ban would start at midnight, July 31, 1942, most people did not take it very seriously; Petrillo had threatened a strike before and nothing had happened. The United States had just entered World War II in December, 1941 and most newspapers opposed the ban. By July, when it appeared that the ban would indeed take place, America's big three record companies (RCA Victor, Columbia and Decca) began to stockpile new recordings of their most popular artists. In the first two weeks of July, these performers all recorded new material: Tommy Dorsey, Jimmy Dorsey, Charlie Barnet, Bing Crosby, Guy Lombardo, and Glenn Miller, who made his last records as a civilian bandleader. Recording during the last week was a long list of performers, including Count Basie, Woody Herman, Alvino Ray, Johnny Long, Claude Thornhill, Judy Garland, Crosby (again), Glen Gray, Benny Goodman, Kay Kyser, Dinah Shore, Spike Jones, and Duke Ellington, among others.

== During the strike ==
Several months passed before any effects of the strike were noticed. At first, the record companies hoped to call the union's bluff by releasing new titles from their large stockpiles of unissued discs, but the strike lasted much longer than anticipated and eventually the supply of unreleased recordings was exhausted. The companies also released some previously rejected titles and reissued several long deleted recordings from their back catalogs, including some from as far back as 1925, the dawn of the electrical recording era. One reissue that was especially successful was Columbia's release of Harry James's "All or Nothing at All", recorded in August, 1939 and released when James's new vocalist, Frank Sinatra, was still largely unknown. The original release carried the usual credit, "Vocal Chorus by Frank Sinatra" in small type and the record sold around five thousand copies; when Columbia reissued the record in 1943 with the now famous Sinatra given top billing, and "with Harry James and his Orchestra" in small type below, the record was on the best–selling list for 18 weeks and reached number 2 on June 2, 1943.

In 1942, the song "As Time Goes By" became immensely popular after it was featured in the Warner Bros. film Casablanca. Rudy Vallée recorded the song for RCA Victor in 1931, and the reissue of his 12-year-old record became a number-one hit.

As the strike continued into 1943, record companies bypassed the striking musicians by recording their popular vocalists accompanied by backup vocal groups in place of an orchestra. Columbia had signed Sinatra on June 1, 1943 and was eager to issue records featuring their new star; the company therefore hired Axel Stordahl as arranger and conductor for several sessions with a vocal group called the Bobby Tucker Singers. These first sessions were on June 7, June 22, August 5, and November 10, 1943. Of the nine songs released from these sessions, seven charted on the best–selling list. Other recordings made this way included:

- Perry Como's first RCA Victor record "Goodbye Sue" (1943) (1944 V-Disc version with orchestra)
- "Have I Stayed Away Too Long?" by Perry Como
- "Lili Marlene" by Perry Como
- "Long Ago (and Far Away)" by Perry Como
- "Sunday, Monday, or Always"
  - by Bing Crosby
  - by Frank Sinatra
- "You'll Never Know"
  - by Frank Sinatra
  - by Dick Haymes

The strike also had an effect on radio programs that used recorded music, due to the limited number of new recordings available. Radio shows that relied mainly on records found it difficult to keep introducing new songs to their listeners. Martin Block, host of WNEW's Make Believe Ballroom radio show, circumvented the ban by having friends in England send him records produced in the UK, where the ban was not in effect. He was forced to discontinue this practice after the station's house orchestra staged a retaliatory strike, which was settled after WNEW agreed not to broadcast any records made after August 1, 1942.

The only prominent musical organization not to be affected by the strike's onset was the Boston Symphony Orchestra, as they were not a member of the union. The orchestra joined the union (and the strike) in late 1942; this kicked off a long series of live BSO radio concerts broadcast on CBS.

== Ending the strike ==
Some smaller recording companies did not have an extensive backlog of recordings and they settled with the union after just over a year. Decca Records and its transcription subsidiary World Broadcasting System settled in September 1943, agreeing to make direct payments to a union-controlled "relief fund", followed shortly by the recently established Capitol Records, on October 11, 1943. Capitol had only issued its first records on July 1, 1942, one month before the strike began.

Other recording and transcription companies continued to pursue the case with the National Labor Relations Board and the National War Labor Board, culminating in a WLB directive demanding that the AFM rescind its ban on musicians recording for those companies. When the AFM refused to comply, the matter was referred to President Franklin D. Roosevelt, who wrote to James Petrillo:

In a country which loves democratic government and loves keen competition under the rules of the game, parties to a dispute should adhere to the decision of the Board even though one of the parties may consider the decision wrong. Therefore, in the interest of orderly government and in the interest of respecting the considered decision of the Board, I request your union to accept the directive orders of the National War Labor Board. What you regard as your loss will certainly be your country's gain.

— Roosevelt's telegram to Petrillo, October 4, 1944

The union refused to budge, and with competing companies having made new recordings for over a year, RCA Victor and Columbia finally capitulated, agreeing to substantially similar terms as the other recording companies, on November 11, 1944. The new contract with the AFM included language releasing artists from exclusive recording contracts should the union strike those companies. Within a few hours after signing the new contract, RCA Victor had Vaughn Monroe and his orchestra record two songs from the new Metro-Goldwyn-Mayer film musical, Meet Me in St. Louis. The record was quickly mastered, pressed and placed on sale just two days later.

The end of the strike was not the end of the royalty dispute, however. As television was beginning, there were questions regarding musicians and royalties from this new medium, and a similar, but much shorter strike was called for 1948, lasting close to a year, ending on December 14, 1948.

== Consequences ==
Over the long term the record companies were not hurt by the strike. In 1941, 127 million records were sold; in 1946, two years after the strike, that number jumped to 275 million and it jumped higher in 1947 to 400 million.

=== Small specialty labels ===
The strike stopped business between major record labels and musicians under contract with them. With recording and manufacturing equipment idle from the strike, enterprising music promoters, record distributors and store owners with the right connections took the opportunity to start small specialty labels, such as Savoy (1942) and Apollo (1943–44), that catered to musicians who were not under contract. Sometimes musicians under contract restrictions recorded for them under pseudonyms. That business model worked in large urban markets such as New York, Chicago, and Los Angeles, where concentrated markets allowed a sufficient return from local distribution.

Many of the historically important recordings of jazz and R&B from the mid-1940s originated from these small labels, including an early 1944 recording of "Woody'n You" for Apollo featuring Coleman Hawkins and Dizzy Gillespie, which is often cited as the first formal recording of the form of jazz known as bebop. Although not lucrative for musicians, these small labels gained them exposure that sometimes led to contracts with more established labels.

=== Decline of the big bands ===
One unexpected result of the strike was the decline in popularity of the big bands of the 1930s and early 1940s. The strike was not the only cause of this decline, but it hastened the shift from big bands with an accompanying vocalist to an emphasis on the vocalist, with the exclusion of the band. In the 1930s and pre–strike 1940s, big bands dominated popular music; immediately following the strike, vocalists began to dominate popular music.

During the strike, vocalists could and did record without instrumentalists; instrumentalists could not record for the public at all. As historian Peter Soderbergh expressed it, "Until the war most singers were props. After the war they became the stars and the role of the bands was gradually subordinated."

Even before the strike began there were signs that the increasing popularity of singers was beginning to reshape the big bands. When Frank Sinatra joined Tommy Dorsey's band in 1940, most selections started with a Tommy Dorsey solo. By the time Sinatra left in 1942, his songs with the band began with his singing, followed by any solos by Dorsey or others.

A significant moment in the rise of the vocalist occurred when Sinatra performed with Benny Goodman and his Orchestra at New York City's Paramount Theater on December 30, 1942. Sinatra was third–billed on the program and although he was then the most popular singer in the country, Goodman had never heard of him. Goodman announced him and the audience roared and shrieked for five minutes. Goodman's bewildered response was, "What the hell was that?" Once Sinatra started to sing, the audience continued to shriek during every song. As a saxophone player later said, "When Frank hit that screaming bunch of kids, the big bands just went right into the background."

The other major cause of the decline of the big bands was World War II itself—and the resulting loss of band members who were drafted, curtailment of traveling by touring bands because of gasoline and other rationing, and a shortage of the shellac used to manufacture records.

=== Lack of recordings of early bebop ===
As discussed by James Lincoln Collier, Geoffrey Ward, and Ken Burns, the new musical style known later as bebop, developed by Charlie Parker and Dizzy Gillespie and others during the period of the strike, was not recorded and was not available to the general public because of the strike. James Lincoln Collier wrote in The Making of Jazz: "By about 1942 it was clear to musicians that here was something more than mere experimentation. Here was a new kind of music. Unfortunately, we cannot pinpoint these developments [because of the strike]. As a result there are few commercial recordings of any of the bop players during the years they were working out their innovations." As Geoffrey C. Ward and Ken Burns put it in Jazz: A History of America's Music (based on Burns's miniseries), "And so, except for a handful of dedicated collaborators and a few devoted fans, the new music Parker and Gillespie and their cohorts were developing remained largely a secret".

However, session dates of specialty labels such as Keynote, Savoy, and Apollo continued recording during the period when the ban was affecting the major labels. Those recordings for the most part showcased the more established styles of jazz, R&B, calypso, and gospel, with bebop first recorded for the Apollo label in early 1944. All of the recordings of bebop from 1944 to 1945 after the strike were performed for small labels, with the new music only later starting to gain promotion from the majors.
