= Jack Lescoulie =

American radio and television announcer (1912–1987)

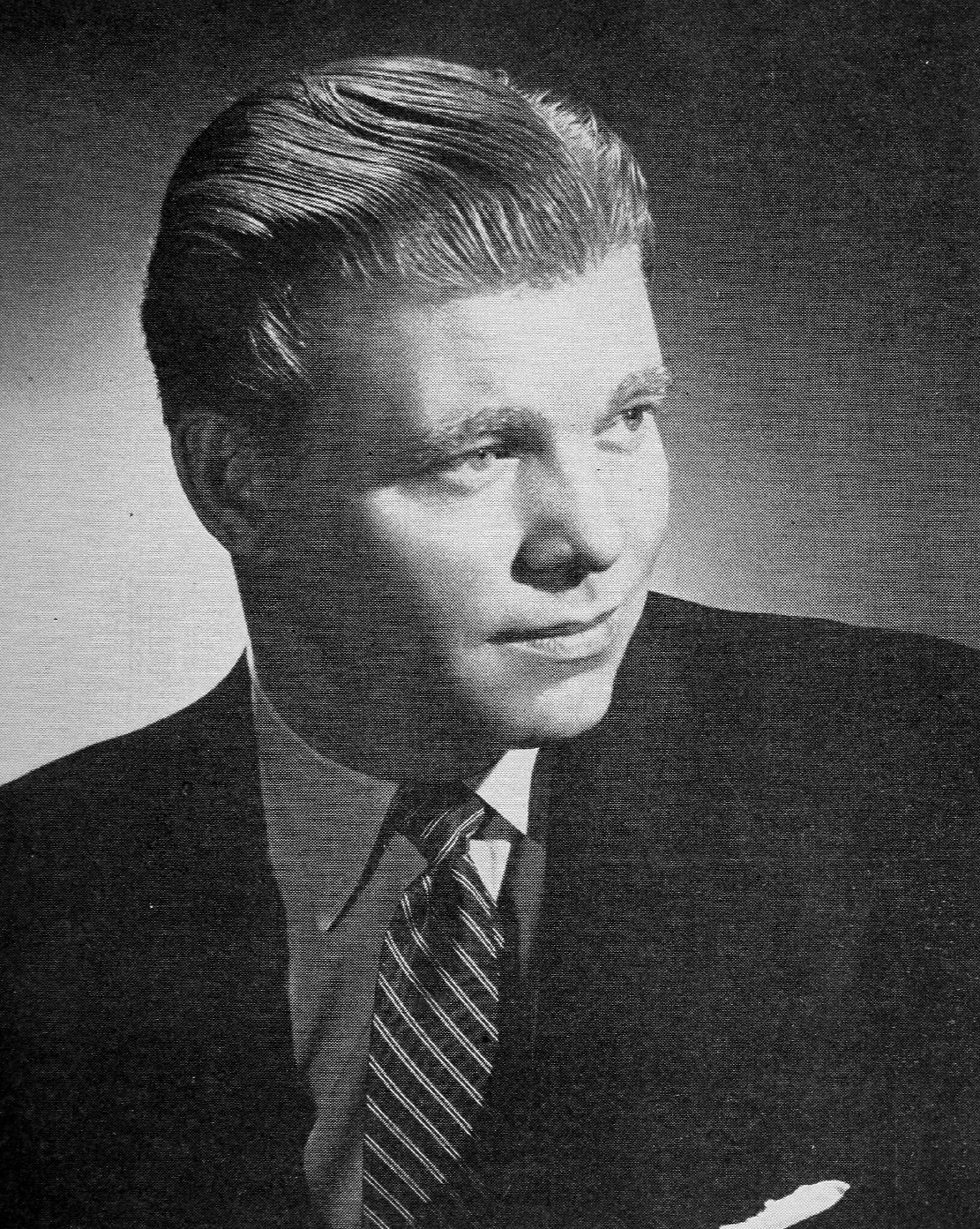
- Lescoulie circa 1954
- Born: November 17, 1912; Sacramento, California, U.S.
- Died: July 22, 1987 (aged 74); Memphis, Tennessee, U.S.
- Years active: 1933–1967
- Spouse: Virginia Lescoulie (?-1987) (his death)
- Children: 2
- Presenting career
- Show: Today
- Station: NBC

Jack Lescoulie (November 17, 1912 – July 22, 1987) was an American radio and television announcer and host, notably on NBC's Today during the 1950s and 1960s; a newspaper source lists his date of birth as May 17, 1912. Lescoulie was also known for his voice impersonation of comedian Jack Benny.

== Early years ==
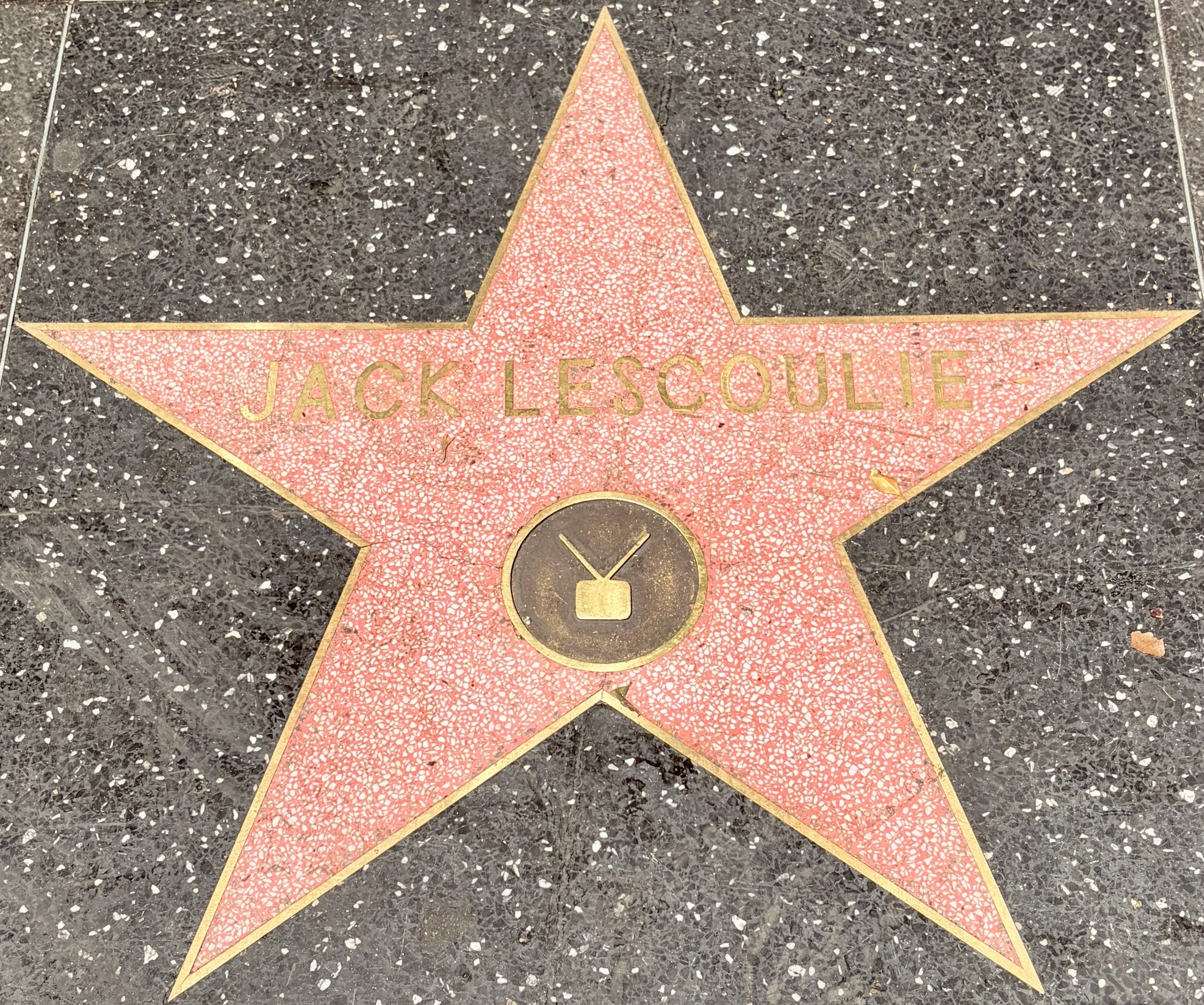
Hollywood Walk of Fame star

Lescoulie was born in Sacramento, California. His parents were both in vaudeville along with their children; Lescoulie's first public performance was at age 7. His first media job was with KGFJ in Los Angeles, when he was still in high school. The young Lescoulie helped the radio station cover the 1933 Long Beach earthquake. Lescoulie has a star for his work in television on the Hollywood Walk of Fame.

== Radio ==
In 1933, Lescoulie had an orchestra that broadcast on KGFJ in Los Angeles. He was billed as the "Grouchmaster" on The Grouch Club (1938–1940), a program in which people aired their complaints about anything, created by Nat Hiken, creator of The Phil Silvers Show (You'll Never Get Rich) and Car 54, Where Are You?. In the 1940s, he was morning-drive partner to Gene Rayburn on WNEW radio (now WBBR) in New York City, before turning over his role in the team to Dee Finch. The Lescoulie and Finch pairings with Rayburn provided what are believed to be radio's first two-man morning teams. While at WNEW, he also was host of the overnight Milkman's Matinee program.

During World War II, Lescoulie was a war correspondent, flying in Air Force planes on bombing missions over Italy.

In the Fall of 1947, Lescoulie became the "all night radio man" on the Mutual Broadcasting System's New York affiliate WOR (AM). On April 12, 1948, he portrayed a mysterious newscaster in "Twelve to Five," a Quiet, Please fantasy drama which recreated an all-night request radio program so convincingly that some listeners phoned in with requests. He returned to Quiet Please June 4, 1949, in the horror drama, "Tanglefoot."

== Television ==
On television, Lescoulie hosted one of the earliest TV game shows, Fun and Fortune (1949) which lasted only one episode, and he was an announcer on Jackie Gleason's Cavalcade of Stars (1949–1952), as well as the original network announcer for The Honeymooners (1955–1956). He continued to announce for Gleason into the mid-1960s, at which time Gleason began to exclusively use Johnny Olson.

During his long run on Today (1952–1967), Lescoulie's duties included announcing the show at the top and bottom of every hour, conducting interviews, reporting on sports, chatting with the crowd outside the studio and acting as a foil for Dave Garroway's pranks. He once joked that, despite his war correspondent credentials, he was picked for Today because he thought "they were looking for a man who doesn't sleep well in the mornings."

Lescoulie was nicknamed "The Saver" by Garroway for his ability to liven up otherwise dull segments. Typical Lescoulie sketches included acting a scene from Shaw's Caesar and Cleopatra with Jayne Mansfield in July, 1956, and being hit in the face with a pie by Buster Keaton in April, 1963. Often, Lescoulie would act as a traveling companion for Garroway to Today's overseas visits. He co-anchored the remote portions of both the 1959 Paris trip and the 1960 Rome voyage. It was during the latter that Lescoulie took an "accidental" dive into Trevi Fountain in front of unsuspecting pedestrians.

Lescoulie went through a brief stint as host of The Tonight Show for six months in 1957. After Steve Allen's departure from Tonight in January, NBC renamed the show Tonight! America After Dark and transformed it into an interview and news program modeled after Today. Lescoulie, and then Al "Jazzbo" Collins, served as hosts. Lescoulie's tenure ran from January 28 to June 21, 1957.

For a period starting in 1958, Today ceased live broadcasts and instead taped the afternoon before. The official explanation from NBC said the change would add flexibility in scheduling interviews, though the real reason had more to do with relieving strain on the cast. When Garroway left the show in the summer of 1961, NBC announced Today would resume its live broadcasts on July 17. Lescoulie promptly resigned, saying "I can't face those hours anymore."

Lescoulie moved on to host the NBC educational children's series 1, 2, 3 Go!, which was canceled on May 20, 1962. He returned to Today that summer and stayed for another five years.

Lescoulie left the show permanently in 1967, and the role he originated was filled by Joe Garagiola, Willard Scott, and Al Roker.

== Films ==
Between 1938 and 1950, Lescoulie had a number of roles as a film actor, mostly uncredited, but he used the name Joe Hartman when he acted in the aviation drama Emergency Landing (1941).

Lescoulie also recorded voice-overs for five Warner Bros. Cartoons shorts:

- Daffy Duck and the Dinosaur (1939), a Chuck Jones short in which Lescoulie voiced Casper Caveman, an impersonation of Jack Benny.
- Slap Happy Pappy (1940), a Bob Clampett short in which Lescoulie voiced a rabbit named Jack Bunny, an impersonation of Jack Benny.
- Malibu Beach Party (1940), a Friz Freleng short in which he voiced Jack Bunny, an impersonation of Jack Benny.
- Goofy Groceries (1941), a Bob Clampett short in which Lescoulie voiced a rabbit named Jack Bunny, an impersonation of Jack Benny.
- Meet John Doughboy (1941), a Bob Clampett short in which Lescoulie voiced a caricature of Jack Benny.

== Stage ==
Lescoulie appeared in one Broadway play, Tapestry in Gray (1935-1936). He also appeared in other theatrical productions, such as Achilles Had a Heel in New York City in 1935.

== Death ==
Lescoulie died on July 22, 1987, in St. Francis Hospital in Memphis, Tennessee, where he was undergoing treatment for colon cancer.
