= Tampico (song) =

Single by Stan Kenton
- B-side: "Southern Scandal"
- Released: 1945
- Genre: Jazz, Pop
- Length: 2:42
- Label: Capitol
- Songwriters: Allan Roberts; Doris Fisher

"Tampico" is a popular song, composed in 1945 by Allan Roberts, with lyrics by Doris Fisher. It was recorded and released in that year by Stan Kenton, earning a gold record award. The recording, featuring June Christy on vocals, became a top-10 hit in 1945, peaking at #3 on the Billboard charts. Christy later commented to the "Jazz Journal International" that she had been disappointed that her first recording with Kenton was "Tampico," but was fortunate that it was a hit and established her right away.

== Background ==
The song takes a satirical look at the Mexican city of its title, suggesting that at the time, Tampico, Tamaulipas, had become more Americanized than the U.S. itself, and that many of the souvenirs which could be bought there had been manufactured in the United States. "You buy a beautiful shawl; a souvenir for Aunt Flo. Authentic Mexican art – made in Idaho."

== Other recordings ==
Other recordings of "Tampico" have been made by Benny Goodman, Doris Fisher and Edmundo Ros among others. The song was also performed by Jo Stafford at The Chesterfield Supper Club and can be heard on the album At the Supper Club Part III.

== Sources ==
- Agostinelli, Anthony Joseph (1986). Stan Kenton: The Many Musical Moods of His Orchestras. AJ Agostinelli.
- Colt, Freddy (2013). Stan Kenton, il Vate del Progressive Jazz. Mellophonium Broadsides, San Remo (Italy).
- Easton, Carol (1981). Straight Ahead: The Story of Stan Kenton. Da Capo. ISBN 978-0-306-80152-5.
- Gabel, Edward F. (1993). Stan Kenton: The Early Years, 1941-1947. Lake Geneva, WI: Balboa Books. ISBN 978-0936653518.
