= At the Supper Club =

Compilation album by Perry Como
- Released: September 21, 2010
- Recorded: May 1946
- Genre: Vocal
- Label: Sounds of Yesteryear

Perry Como chronology
On the Radio – The Perry Como Shows 1943 (2009)	'''At the Supper Club''' (2010)	At the Supper Club Part II (2011)

At the Supper Club is a posthumous 2010 album consisting of recordings of Perry Como performing on the radio variety show The Chesterfield Supper Club, recorded for the Armed Forces Radio Service (AFRS), in 1946. Others featured on the broadcasts are Lloyd Shaffer and his Orchestra, The Satisfiers, and announcer Martin Block. Guests include Nat King Cole, Spike Jones and his City Slickers, Peggy Lee, Diana Lynn and the Modernaires with Paula Kelly.

== Track listing ==
1. "All The Things You Are"
2. "Shoo Fly Pie"
3. "Laura"
4. "Laughing On The Outside"
5. "You Won't Be Satisfied"
6. "There's Always Tomorrow"
7. "I Don't Know Enough About You"
8. "They Say It's Wonderful"
9. "Jog Along"
10. "It's Just A Matter Of Opinion"
11. "If You Were The Only Girl In The World"
12. "(Get Your Kicks) on Route 66"
13. "More Than You Know"
14. "You Must Have Been A Beautiful Baby"
15. "Without A Penny In Your Pocket"
16. "Don't Blame Me"
17. "La Cucaracha"
18. "Full Moon And Empty Arms"
19. "Out California Way"
20. "Isn't It Romantic?"
21. "Come To Baby, Do"
22. "Sweet Kentucky Babe"
23. "Holiday For Strings"
24. "I Fall In Love With You Every Day"
25. "Rondo"
26. "Surrender"
27. "Stardust"
28. "All The Things You Are"
