= Dotty Mack =

From a publicity shot with Dick van Dyke

Dotty Mack (born Dorothy Zompero, April 25, 1929 – November 11, 2019) was a lip sync actress and mime artist, known as the "Queen of Pantomime" for her appearances in The Paul Dixon Show (1951), The Dotty Mack Show (1953) and Cavalcade of Stars (1949).

== Early life ==
Mack was born in Price Hill, Cincinnati, Ohio, and attended the Mother of Mercy High School, graduating in 1947. She then worked as a human mannequin in a department store window in Cincinnati, and as a salesperson, before being employed as a record librarian at WCPO-AM radio in March 1949.

== Career ==
Mack appeared in Paul Dixon's radio show. When WCPO-TV started in July 1949, she transferred to the Paul Dixon's Song Shop on television, performing with Dixon and Wanda Lewis. She lip-synched to songs by singers including Rosemary Clooney, Doris Day, Dinah Shore, Patti Page, and Eartha Kitt. She was known as the "Queen of Pantomime" for "her striking beauty and seemingly innate ability to pantomime expertly any type of song." She was so popular that she was given her own show, first Your Pantomime Hit Parade, then a 15-minute show called Girl Alone, and finally a half-hour program called The Dotty Mack Show, in which she was joined by Bob Braun and Colin Male. ABC and the DuMont Television Network screened the Dotty Mack Show nationally from 1953 to 1956. By 1955, a Dotty Mack fan club existed in Cincinnati. TV host Faye Emerson said of her show in 1954, she is "extremely talented ... She can be cute as a kitten's ear, romantic as rose petals, or sultry as absinthe ... She is a good actress and her sense of timing is nothing short of miraculous." However, Emerson wrote, she "would still rather see Rosemary Clooney singing her own songs" than "pretty little parrots like Dotty Mack and her friends." She sometimes had enquiries for singing from people who did not know that she was principally a mime. She was noted for her beautiful gowns on the air; however, there was no clothing allowance, so they were all hers.

== Personal life ==
Mack went out with Dick Van Dyke, Frank Sinatra and Joe DiMaggio. She married William B. Williams who was a disc jockey in New York in 1960. In 1961 her son Jeffrey, was born and she became a full time mother, but she still mixed socially with Doris Day, Rosemary Clooney, Steve Lawrence and Eydie Gorme. She moved to Miami, Florida after her husband died in 1986, where she died on November 11, 2019.
