= Adventures in Jazz =

American TV musical series

- Genre: Music
- Directed by: Levy, Ralph
- Country of origin: United States
- Original language: English
- No. of episodes: 23

Production
- Running time: 30 Minutes

Original release
- Network: CBS
- Release: January 22 – June 24, 1949

Adventures in Jazz is a CBS television show that was broadcast live from January 22, 1949, to June 24, 1949, 8-8:30 Eastern Time on Fridays, showcasing jazz musicians and singers.

Guest performers came from both traditional jazz and modern jazz styles. They included Sidney Bechet, Charlie Parker, Artie Shaw, Ella Fitzgerald, Duke Ellington, Miles Davis, Charlie Parker, Count Basie and June Christy made appearances on the short-lived series, with a total of 23 episodes.

Radio personality Fred Robbins hosted the series premiere on Saturday, January 22, 1949 (the show moved to its regular time-slot on the following Friday) but left due to other commitments. He was replaced by DJ Bill Williams, and later bandleader Bobby Sherwood, until his return on the April 29 episode. Original host Fred Robbins explained some of the vernacular of the genres to the viewing public.

Robert L. Bach produced the program. Directors included Ralph Levy and Kingman T. Moore.

Adventures in Jazz was a sustaining program.
