= Helen Carroll and the Satisfiers =

American harmony group

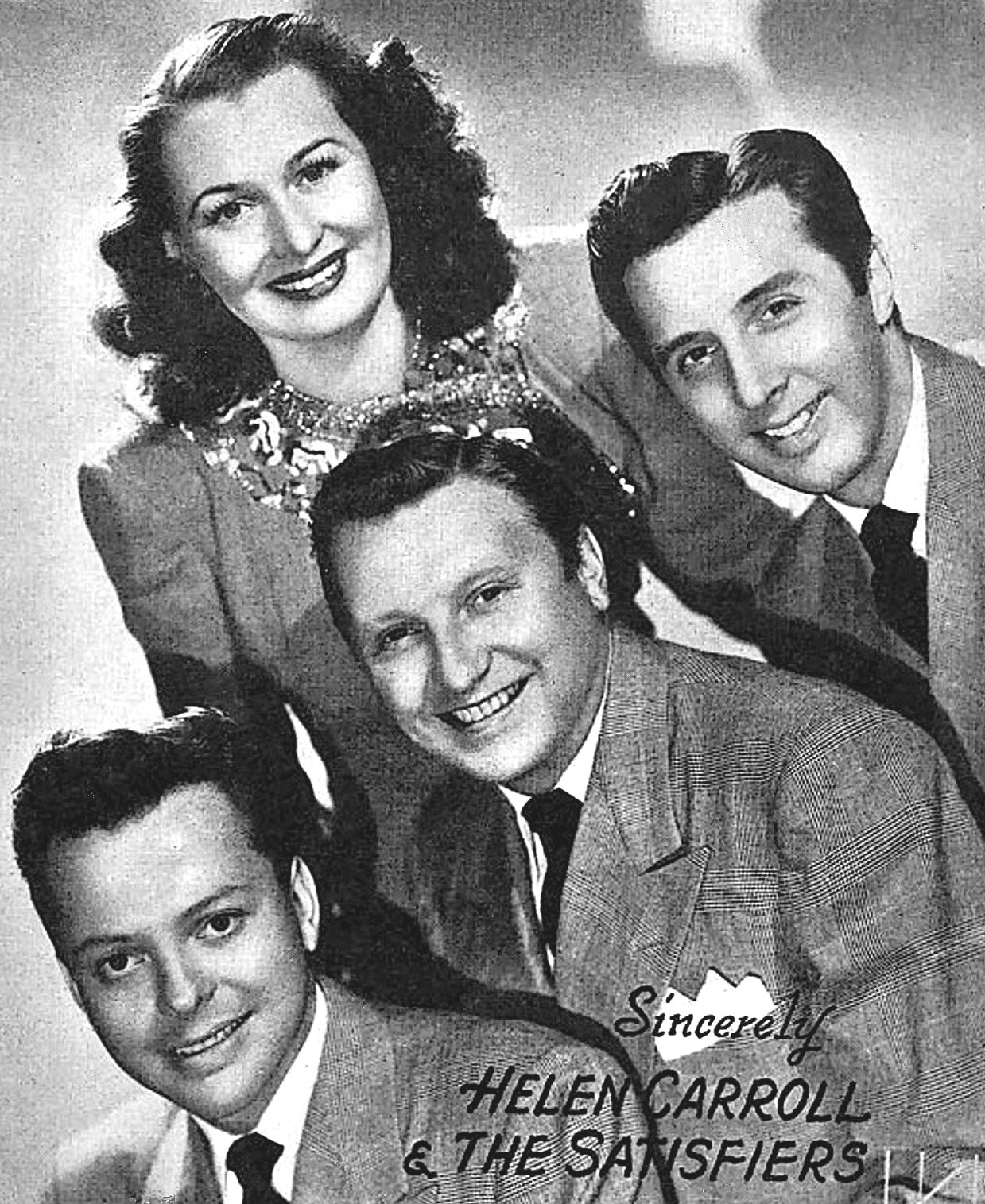
The group in 1948

Helen Carroll and the Satisfiers were an American smooth harmony popular music singing group of the mid-20th century consisting of Carroll and three male singers: Bob Lange, Ted Hansen, and Art Lambert.

Helen Carroll was the stage name of Helen Kress (née Fulk) (May 23, 1914, in Bloomington, Indiana – February 21, 2011, in Rye, New Hampshire). Helen Carroll began her singing career as a teenager on old-time radio in Memphis, Tennessee. Carroll returned to Indiana and enrolled at the Indiana University (with campuses in Bloomington and Indianapolis) for college, but left college in her senior year to pursue a career in broadcasting. She settled on the East Coast in New York City with hopes of working on Broadway theater entertainment, making her debut in the chorus of the short lived Geoffrey O'Hara musical Rogues and Vagabonds in 1930. Her appearances on Broadway were sporadic, including the roles of Daphne in Arthur Schwartz's Virginia (1937), the Citizen of New Amsterdam in Knickerbocker Holiday (1938–1939), and a woman tourist in Key Largo (1939). She found regular employment performing after auditioning for a group called the Merry Macs. With the Merry Macs, she appeared on Fred Allen's (1894–1956) show and in the 1940 movie Love Thy Neighbor. Carroll left the group when it relocated west to California; she signed on with the vocal group The Satisfiers only after that group promised to remain in New York City. Carroll was married to guitarist Carl Kress (1907–1965); the couple had a son, Rick, who became a drummer, and went on to become a professor of harmony at the Berklee College of Music in Boston, Massachusetts.

Helen Carroll and the Satisfiers were regulars on Perry Como's Chesterfield Supper Club which ran from 1944 to 1949. (One of Chesterfield's long-term advertising taglines was "They Satisfy", and the Satisfiers were named on this basis.) With or without Carroll, the Satisfiers also backed Como on some recordings. Most of the group's recording on their own were made with trumpeter Russ Case's orchestra for instrumental accompaniment.

Helen Carroll and the Satisfiers' recording of "Old Buttermilk Sky" reached No. 7 on the Billboard top-selling retail records chart for November 23, 1946 (there was no unified Billboard Hot 100 chart yet, but the retail sales chart is sometimes (although not always) considered the nearest approximation). Billboard described the record as exhibiting "easy flowing melodies and rhythms" which "fall easy on the ears" making for a "bright and breezy" performance. This recording also appeared on Billboard's chart of songs most played on jukeboxes.

Helen Carroll and the Satisfiers performed the theme song for the Little Lulu theatrical animated shorts. The song was written by Buddy Kaye, Fred Wise, and Sidney Lippman for the series, of which 26 cartoons were produced by Famous Studios for Paramount Pictures between 1943 and 1948.

Carroll, with an ad-hoc group called the Swantones, backed Frank Sinatra on one 1950 single, "Life is So Peculiar".

== Discography ==
Singles

- "Connee Boswell" with the Satisfiers ("Who'll Lend Me A Rainbow" Decca 18689 and "When I Come Back Crying/You Can't Say I Didn't Try" Coral 60040) -1945
- "Perry Como with the Satisfiers & Russ Case Orchestra ("Dig You Later" also titled "A Hubba-Hubba-Hubba") Victor 20-1750, October 1945
- "(L'il Abner) Don't Marry That Girl!" / "The Boogie Woogie Barnyard" (with the Russ Case Orchestra) (Victor 20-1928, 1946)
- "Let's Sail to Dreamland" / "Ole Buttermilk Sky" (Note: From the film Canyon Passage) (with the Russ Case Orchestra) (Victor 20-1952, 1946)
- "Who'd A Thunk It" / "(Why, Oh Why, Did I Ever Leave) Wyoming?" (with the Russ Case Orchestra) (Victor 20-2191, 1947)
- "Smoke Dreams" (Note: Adapted from the Chesterfield Supper Club theme.) / "Do You Love Me Just As Much As Ever?" (with the Russ Case Orchestra) (RCA Victor 20-2300, 1947)
- "Love Is So Terrific (Ouch! Terrific Thing)" / "A Little Consideration" (with the Russ Case Orchestra) (RCA Victor 20-2672, 1948)
- "Shauny O'Shea" / "Little Lulu" (with the Russ Case Orchestra) (Victor 20-2673, 1948)
- "Big Brass Band from Brazil" / "The Secretary Song (Bidibi Bot Bot)" (with the Russ Case Orchestra) (Victor, 1948)
- "Takin' Miss Mary to the Ball" (Note: From the film On an Island with You) / "Walk A Little, Talk A Little" (with the Russ Case Orchestra) (RCA Victor 20-2868, 1948)
- "Raggedy Ann" (Note: From the 1923 musical Stepping Stones) / "Highway to Love" (Victor 20-2915, 1948)

Compilations

- "Auld Lang Syne" (featuring Beryl Davis; with Russ Case & His Orchestra) on The Very Best of Beryl Davis (2012, Stardust Records)
- "I'm Always Chasing Rainbows" (featuring Perry Como) on Adapting the Classics (2013, Sounds of Yesteryear)
- Perry Como at the Supper Club
- Perry Como at the Supper Club Part II
- Perry Como at the Supper Club Part III
- Jo Stafford at the Supper Club
- Jo Stafford at the Supper Club Part II
- Jo Stafford at the Supper Club Part III

Compilations (Helen Carroll with the Swantones)

- "Life is So Peculiar" (Note: From the movie Mr. Music) (featuring Frank Sinatra) on Frank Sinatra Sings Songs From the Movies (2003, Sony Music Distribution #70081)
