= At the Supper Club Part II (Stafford) =

Compilation album by Jo Stafford
- Released: February 15, 2011
- Recorded: March–April 1946
- Genre: Vocal
- Label: Sounds of Yesteryear

Jo Stafford chronology
At the Supper Club (2010)	At the Supper Club Part II (2011)	At the Supper Club Part III (2011)

This compact disk was created from transcriptions of The Chesterfield Supper Club recorded for the Armed Forces Radio Service (AFRS) in March and April 1946. Others featured on the broadcasts are Carl Kress and his Orchestra, Helen Carroll and the Satisfiers, and Lloyd Shaffer and his Orchestra. Guests are Benny Goodman, Xavier Cugat, Cozy Cole, Mel Powell, and Bob Eberly.

== Track listing ==
1. All The Things You Are
2. "What A Deal!"
3. "I Can't Begin to Tell You"
4. "Love Letters"
5. "Yesterdays"
6. "Patience and Fortitude"
7. "Down Honeymoon Lane (I'll Be Walking With My Baby)"
8. "I Didn't Mean a Word I Said"
9. "Aren't You Glad You're You"
10. "I Can't Give You Anything but Love, Baby"
11. "If I Had a Dozen Hearts"
12. "It's a Grand Night for Singing"
13. "Old Man Harlem"
14. "Falling in Love With Love"
15. "A Little Consideration"
16. "Oye Negra"
17. "Day By Day"
18. "I'll Remember April"
19. "My Romance"
20. "Doctor, Lawyer, Indian Chief"
21. "They Say It's Wonderful"
22. "All the Things You Are"
