= At the Supper Club Part III (Jo Stafford album) =

Compilation album by Jo Stafford
- Released: June 21, 2011
- Recorded: 1945–1946, 1949
- Genre: Vocal
- Label: Sounds of Yesteryear

Jo Stafford chronology
At the Supper Club Part II (2011)	At the Supper Club Part III (2011)

At the Supper Club Part III is a 2011 album release of recordings by the American singer Jo Stafford. The tracks are taken from her appearances on The Chesterfield Supper Club, the NBC variety program of the 1940s. The recordings on this compilation were made with Lloyd Shafer and His Orchestra, Paul Weston and His Orchestra, Helen Carroll and the Satisfiers, and The Starlighters. Martin Block is the Master Of Ceremonies.

== Track listing ==
1. All The Things You Are (Orchestral Introduction)
2. It's Only A Paper Moon
3. Come Back To Sorrento
4. My Guys Come Back
5. Tampico
6. Give Me The Simple Life
7. Thou Swell
8. I'm Always Chasing Rainbows
9. Catfish, Take A Look A That Worm
10. Tumblin' Tumbleweeds
11. Storybook Romance
12. Ol' Man River
13. When Your Lover Has Gone
14. I May Be Wrong
15. I Don't Know Enough About You
16. You Always Hurt The One You Love
17. Sometimes I'm Happy
18. Love Is So Terrific
19. Smoke Dreams
20. 'S Wonderful
21. Poor Butterfly
22. Girls Were Made To Take Care Of Boys
23. Buttons And Bows
24. The Merry-Go-Round Broke Down
25. One Mornin'
26. Medley: Smoke Dreams/These Foolish Things
27. Smoke Dreams
28. Always True To You In My Fashion
29. He's Gone Away
30. Medley: Sleepy Time Down South/Memphis Blues
31. Powder Your Face With Sunshine
32. Smoke Dreams
