= At the Supper Club (Stafford) =

Compilation album by Jo Stafford
- Released: August 17, 2010
- Recorded: May 1946
- Genre: Vocal
- Label: Sounds of Yesteryear

Jo Stafford chronology
At the Supper Club (2010)	At the Supper Club Part II (2011)

This compact disc was created from transcriptions of The Chesterfield Supper Club recorded for the Armed Forces Radio Service (AFRS) in May 1946. Others featured on the broadcasts are Carl Kress and his Orchestra, Helen Carroll and the Satisfiers.

== Track listing ==
1. "All The Things You Are" (Jerome Kern, Oscar Hammerstein II)
2. "Personality" (Jimmy Van Heusen, Johnny Burke)
3. "My Old Flame" (Sam Coslow, Arthur Johnston)
4. "Come Rain or Come Shine" (Harold Arlen, Johnny Mercer)
5. "In Atlanta GA"
6. "I'm in the Mood for Love" (Jimmy McHugh, Dorothy Fields)
7. "Walkin' My Baby Back Home" (Fred E. Ahlert, Roy Turk)
8. "I've Got the World on a String" (Harold Arlen. Ted Koehler)
9. "Sioux City Sue" (Dick Thomas, Ray Freedman)
10. "In the Moon Mist" (Benjamin Godard, Jack Lawrence)
11. Irving Berlin Medley
12. "April Showers" (Louis Silvers, B. G. De Sylva)
13. "S'posin'" (Paul Denniker, Andy Razaf)
14. "Cement Mixer" (Slim Gaillard)
15. "Oh! What it Seemed to Be" (Bennie Benjamin, George Weiss, Frankie Carle)
16. "Strange Love" (Miklós Rózsa, Edward Heyman)
17. "Great Day" (Vincent Youmans, William Rose, Edward Eliscu)
18. "All Through the Day" (Jerome Kern, Oscar Hammerstein II)
19. "Just You, Just Me" (Jesse Greer, Raymond Klages)
20. "One-Zy, Two-Zy (I Love You-Zy)" (Dave Franklin, Irving Taylor)
21. "I Got the Sun in the Mornin' (and the Moon at Night)" Irving Berlin)
22. "All the Things You Are" (Jerome Kern, Oscar Hammerstein II)
