= The Dotty Mack Show =

American TV variety series (1953–1956)

- Also known as: Girl Alone
- Genre: Variety
- Starring: Dotty Mack; Colin Male; Bob Braun
- Country of origin: United States
- Original language: English

Production
- Running time: 15 mins. (February–June 1953); 30 mins. (June 1953-September 1956)

Original release
- Network: DuMont (1953); ABC (1953-1956)
- Release: February 16, 1953 – September 3, 1956

The Dotty Mack Show is an American variety show originally broadcast on the now defunct DuMont Television Network in 1953, and on ABC from 1953 to 1956.

== Broadcast history ==
The program, produced and distributed from Cincinnati, aired Monday at 10:45 pm on most DuMont affiliates until July 1953, when it moved to Tuesdays at 9:30 pm.

Originally titled Girl Alone, the program featured performer Dotty Mack lip synching and dancing to popular 1950s songs. The name of the program was changed to The Dotty Mack Show in the summer of 1953 when she was joined by male performers Colin Male and Bob Braun. The last DuMont show was on August 25, 1953.

The series then moved to ABC, first on Saturdays at 8 pm, replacing a program of dance band remote broadcasts from Chicago and New York. It ran opposite The Mickey Rooney Show: Hey, Mulligan! on NBC and The Jackie Gleason Show on CBS. It then moved to Mondays at 9 pm on ABC, and remained on that network in various timeslots until being canceled in September 1956.

== See also ==
- List of programs broadcast by the DuMont Television Network
- List of surviving DuMont Television Network broadcasts
- Hit Parade - Australian series with similar format

== Bibliography ==
- David Weinstein, The Forgotten Network: DuMont and the Birth of American Television (Philadelphia: Temple University Press, 2004) ISBN 1-59213-245-6
- Tim Brooks and Earle Marsh, The Complete Directory to Prime Time Network and Cable TV Shows 1946–Present, Ninth edition (New York: Ballantine Books, 2007) ISBN 978-0-345-49773-4
