= Perry Como's Christmas Concert =

Live album by Perry Como
- Released: November 7, 1994
- Recorded: January 21, 1994
- Genre: Vocal
- Length: 56.30
- Label: Teal Entertainment
- Producer: Bob Wynn

Perry Como chronology
Today (1987)	Perry Como's Christmas Concert (1994)	On the Radio – The Perry Como Shows 1943 (2009)

Professional ratings
Review scores
Source	Rating
Allmusic	3/5 stars

Perry Como's Christmas Concert is a 1994 live recording by Perry Como, the last before his death in 2001.

== Overview ==
Taped at the Point Theatre in Dublin before a live audience of 4,500 which included Irish President Mary Robinson, the concert was also issued on videotape and broadcast in the USA on PBS. Como, looking aged and unwell was suffering from the flu and struggled to perform; he reportedly lost his voice at one point during the concert. The entire performance is less than 90 minutes long, though the recording took over four hours to complete. Despite it all, Como managed to complete his last recorded performance with dignity and professionalism, earning him the warm applause of his audience. Como later apologized to his audience for a performance he felt was not up to his usual standards.

== Track listing ==
1. "A Little Bit of Ireland" (0.31)
2. "If I Could Read Your Mind" (3.07)
3. "Happy Holidays" / "We Need a Little Christmas" (2.52)
4. Carol Medley: "It's Beginning to Look a Lot Like Christmas", "Have Yourself a Merry Little Christmas", "The Bells of St. Mary's", "Bless This House" (5.14)
5. "The Little Drummer Boy" (3.28)
6. "O Holy Night" (1.55)
7. Record Medley: "And I Love You So", "Catch a Falling Star", "Round and Round", "Hot Diggity", "Don't Let the Stars Get in Your Eyes" (5.40)
8. "Too ra loo ra loo ra" (featuring Adele King) (4.43)
9. "The Father of Girls" (3.34)
10. "Christ Is Born" (2.12)
11. Medley: "If You're Irish Come Into The Parlour", "When Irish Eyes are Smiling", "Sing Along With Me", "Santa Claus is Comin' to Town", "White Christmas", "Jingle Bells" (4.02)
12. "Wind Beneath My Wings" (3.54)
13. Carol Medley: "O Little Town of Bethlehem", "Hark! The Herald Angels Sing", "Silent Night", "O Come, All Ye Faithful" (5.48)
14. "Toyland" (3.06)
15. "I Wish It Could Be Christmas Forever" / "We Wish You a Merry Christmas" (2.05)
16. "Ave Maria" (4.19)
