= At the Supper Club Part III (Perry Como album) =

Compilation album by Perry Como
- Released: August 16, 2011
- Recorded: 1946–1947
- Genre: Vocal
- Label: Sounds of Yesteryear

Perry Como chronology
| At the Supper Club Part II (2011) | At the Supper Club Part III (2011) |

This collection was created from transcriptions of The Chesterfield Supper Club recorded for the Armed Forces Radio Service (AFRS). Others featured on the broadcasts are Lloyd Shaffer and his Orchestra, Helen Carroll and the Satisfiers, Jo Stafford, Carole Landis, Anne Andre, Kitty Kallen, and The Mills Brothers.

== Track listing ==
1. Introduction: "All The Things You Are"
2. "Sweet Lorraine"
3. "Your Father's Moustache"
4. "Harriet"
5. "How Deep Is the Ocean?"
6. "Just a Sittin' and a Rockin'"
7. "Rockin' Chair"
8. "My Melancholy Baby"
9. "Here Comes Heaven Again"
10. "When You're Away"
11. "Moonbeams"
12. "I'm Falling In Love With Someone"
13. "Tramp! Tramp! Tramp!"
14. "Ah! Sweet Mystery of Life"
15. "Blue Skies"
16. Medley:"Tiger Rag"/"Don't Be a Baby, Baby"
17. "Cynthia's In Love"
18. "Aren't You Glad You're You?"
19. "Some Sunday Morning"
20. "As If I Didn't Have Enough On My Mind"
21. "Love Is Just Around the Corner"
22. "Temptation"
23. "My Momma Says No No"
24. "Personality"
25. Introduction
26. "Blue Skies"
27. "California Sunbeam"
28. "All The Things You Are"
