= Milkman's Matinee =

American radio disc jockey radio program

- Country of origin: United States
- Language: English
- Home station: WNEW
- Hosted by: Al Collins; John Flora; Art Ford; Charlie Jefferds; Bob Jones; Billy Kelso; Jack Lazare; Jack Lescoulie; Ed Locke; Stan Martin; Phil McLean; Dick Partridge; Mayrann Roque; Stan Shaw; Dick Shepard; Bill St. James; Jim Tate; Marty Wilson
- Original release: 1935

Milkman's Matinee is an American radio disc jockey radio program that began on WNEW in New York City in 1935, with the concept later being adopted by other radio stations. The WNEW show was notable for being (at least in its era) the longest daily program on radio at five hours and for making WNEW the first radio station in the world to broadcast 24 hours a day. The program's novelty and impact were such that it received three pages of coverage in the October 23, 1939, issue of Life magazine.

== Background ==
The Biographical Encyclopedia of American Radio credits newspaper columnist Walter Winchell and WNEW general manager Bernice Judis with the creation of Milkman's Matinee. Judis's entry in the book says, "When authoritative columnist Walter Winchell wished (in print) for a radio station that would keep metropolitan New York's all-night work force company during the wee hours, Judis introduced the Milkman's Matinee."

When Stan Shaw began going on the air at 2 a.m. Eastern Time, he made free entertainment available to more than 400,000 night-shift workers in the New York metropolitan area. For six nights a week, he entertained charwomen, bakers, tugboat crews, cab drivers, and others who worked through the early morning hours. Over the years, the program's schedule changed from time to time. In 1960, it was broadcast from midnight to 5:30 a.m. seven days a week.

== Format ==
Shaw played an average of 80 records per program with the help of an assistant. Two teleprinter machines brought in an average of 135 requests per program, with an employee from the Postal Telegraph company on hand to handle the incoming messages. As requests continued to arrive, the station increased the program's record library from its original 10,000 to 24,000 six years later. In January 1942, requests were discontinued in compliance with a wartime censorship code under which "Musical request shows are banned because they offer a means whereby enemy agents can send code messages."

Along with music, Shaw mixed in weather reports, market news, and what Life described as "a fresh stream of homey chatter". Shaw used Anson Weeks' recording, My Very Good Friend the Milkman as his opening and closing theme for each broadcast.

== Partial list of hosts ==
At times, Milkman's Matinee was broadcast seven nights a week. The list below includes those who had only the weekend broadcasts as well as those who had the main Monday-Friday shows.

- Al Collins
- John Flora
- Art Ford
- Charlie Jefferds
- Bob Jones
- Billy Kelso
- Jack Lazare
- Jack Lescoulie
- Ed Locke
- Stan Martin
- Phil McLean
- Dick Partridge
- Maryann Roque
- Stan Shaw
- Dick Shepard
- Bill St. James
- Jim Tate
- Marty Wilson

== Popularity and revenue ==
In 1949, a survey conducted by the Pulse, Inc., rating service found that Milkman's Matinee was the top-rated post-midnight radio program in the metropolitan New York area. A 1955 Pulse survey showed that the program had more than three times the number of listeners of its closest competitor. In 1960, officials at WNEW said ratings for Milkman's Matinee were 20 percent higher than those of its closest competitor. That was the program's 25th year, and the station's general manager said advertising sales over that span were estimated at $2.5 million.

As time went on, the all-night concept had spread to other radio stations, including WPEN in Philadelphia and WBGE in Atlanta. In 1941, a radio columnist for the Brooklyn Eagle wrote that more than 20 stations "have copied the idea".

== Transatlantic transmission ==
On August 15, 1947, two apparently unprecedented events occurred on Milkman's Matinee. Art Ford broadcast via shortwave radio from studios of the British Broadcasting Corporation in London, England, as part of a salute to the musical Oklahoma!. Besides being the first transatlantic disc jockey broadcast, the show also featured the first broadcast of a radio duet between two continents, as Mary Hatcher in New York and Howard Keel in London sang People Will Say We're in Love. Composer Richard Rodgers and librettist Oscar Hammerstein II were also on hand in the studio with Ford.

== Recent years ==
In 2013, Metromedia Radio initiated an automated version of Milkman's Matinee that was syndicated to radio stations in the United States and 60 other countries. For over ten years, the five-hour show, hosted by legacy WNEW DJ Marty Wilson, airs Monday through Friday at midnight on Metromedia Radio
