= William B. Williams (DJ) =

American DJ (1923–1986)

- Born: William Breitbard; August 6, 1923; Babylon, New York, US
- Died: August 3, 1986 (aged 62); New York City, US
- Spouse: Dotty Mack
- Children: 1
- Presenting career
- Show: Make Believe Ballroom
- Station: WNEW
- Style: Disk Jockey

William B. Williams (August 6, 1923 – August 3, 1986) was an American disc jockey on New York City radio station WNEW for over four decades. He hosted the popular program Make Believe Ballroom. Williams is particularly noted for coining the title "Chairman of the Board" for Frank Sinatra.

Unusually, Williams appeared in the November, 1966 issue of Detective Comics, in a story which involved Bruce Wayne and Dick Grayson, the civilian identities of Batman and Robin, appearing on his show. He was given a prominent appearance on the cover for the occasion.

== Early life ==
Born William Breitbard in Babylon, New York, (brother of Ric Roman, character actor in such Hollywood films as Some Came Running and television). Williams himself graduated from Babylon Senior High School and attended Syracuse University for one year before dropping out. In 1944, he was hired as a staff announcer at WAAT in Newark, New Jersey, while visiting a friend at the station. According to Williams "the guy who did the all-night show had just been fired for being bombed on the air." Six weeks later, a staffer at WNEW heard Williams on the air and invited him to apply for a job at the station. He was hired at WNEW and worked several time slots before being fired by station manager Bernice Judis in 1947. An article in the New York Daily News suggested that Williams was fired for his aggressive tactics with management in his role as shop steward; however, WNEW's official story was that he was fired after Judis caught him one evening in the studio with his feet propped on the desk clad in bright red socks. She was apparently horrified by his lack of style.

Williams worked at several other stations, including WOR, but was rehired at WNEW in 1953 following a management change. He hosted the William B. Williams Show in the morning hours, and Music in a Sentimental Mood in the afternoon from 1:00 to 2:00 p.m.

== Make Believe Ballroom ==
In 1954, the originator of the Make Believe Ballroom program in New York, Martin Block, left WNEW for a new job at ABC Radio. Jerry Marshall took over the show for three years, after which Williams was tapped to host the program. He marked the broadcast as his own, using the distinctive sign-on, "Hello, world", and occasionally identifying himself as "Guilliermo B. Guilliermos" or "Wolfgang B. Wolfgang," although to listeners and friends he was known simply as "Willie B." He combined intimate knowledge of music with his personal anecdotes to create a smooth style that captivated listeners. By 1965 Billboard reported Williams was earning $105,000 a year, tops for the station at that time but slightly less than the other famous Williams, Ted, earned at his baseball peak ($125,000).

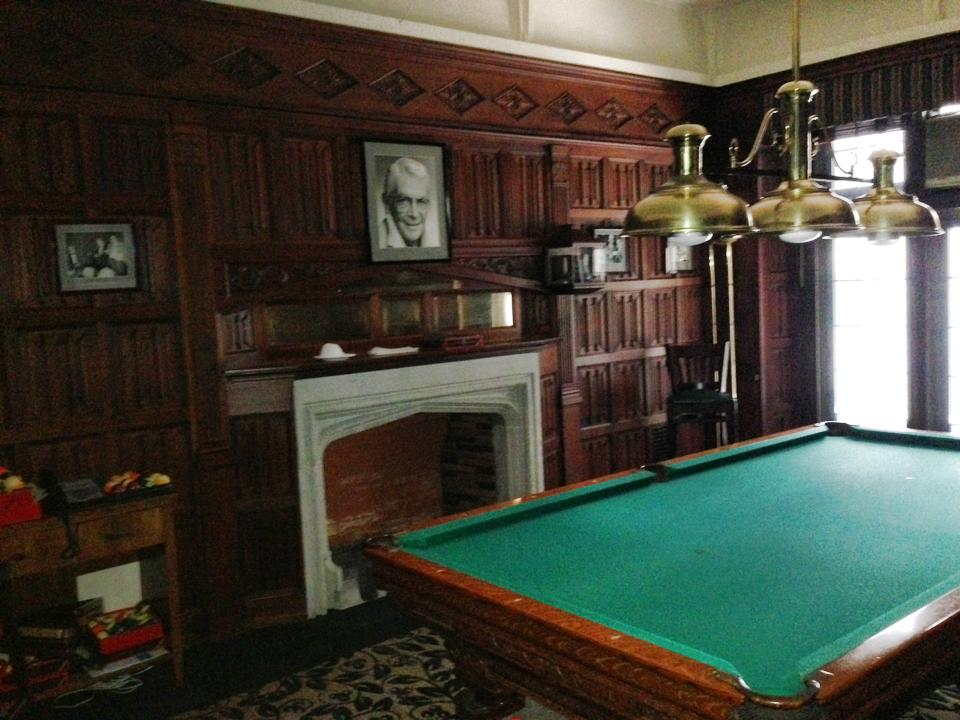
The William B. Williams Room, on the third floor of the Friars Club

Williams developed lasting relationships with the top singers of the Great American Songbook, including Lena Horne and Nat King Cole. Early in his career, he befriended Frank Sinatra when the crooner recorded broadcasts at WNEW. On one broadcast, Williams mused that since Benny Goodman was the "King of Swing" and Duke Ellington was a duke, then Sinatra must have a title as well, suggesting "Chairman of the Board." Sinatra learned of the comment and embraced the title. Later, when interest in standards flagged, Williams persisted in playing Sinatra's music and is credited with a key role in keeping Sinatra's career afloat. Sinatra, to whom loyalty was a key virtue, never forgot Williams and lauded him to any and all who would listen.

== Rock 'n Roll ==
As the emergence of rock 'n roll music began in the 1950s, Williams left no doubt as to where he stood on the subject: against. "Most of it's so bad it's embarrassing," he said. "In the days of the big bands, a vocalist had to be able to sing....I believe teenagers are hungry to hear good music, and at some point we must assume a lot of the blame for the quality of what is being heard. I use the word 'we' to mean disc jockeys and radio stations in general." A well-known advertisement of the era showed Williams holding his nose under the caption "We asked William B. Williams of WNEW Radio what he thought of rock 'n' roll." Still, beginning in the late 1950s, WNEW began mixing in softer tunes from rock artists, which continued into the 1960s. While WNEW was still playing pop standards, soft rock was a big part of the format, making them a MOR station. Williams hated most of these songs, but played them when he had to.

In the 1970s, WNEW became more of an adult contemporary radio station, mixing in very few pop standards. Williams stated that the during the period from 1965 to 1978, WNEW was at its worst, but finally came to its senses. By then, the Make Believe Ballroom title was dropped from Williams' show, although he continued to host in the late morning and early afternoon. In the fall of 1979, much to Williams' happiness, WNEW began restoring the standards format on weekends, middays, and late nights, leading off with a revived Make Believe Ballroom on October 6. In January 1981, WNEW dropped the adult contemporary format (which by then was only heard on weekday mornings and late afternoons) altogether, adopting the standards format full-time.

== Other activity ==
While maintaining his career as a disk jockey, Williams made occasional forays into TV talk and variety shows. As "Bill Williams" he alternated with Fred Robbins as the host of a very early (and short-lived) music program called Adventures in Jazz which aired in 1949 on CBS. He appeared as the announcer/sidekick to a range of guest hosts, and occasional host himself, of ABC's Nightlife, which aired in 1965 and attempted to compete in the late night arena with The Tonight Show Starring Johnny Carson, but did not last. Williams was later also the announcer/sidekick on Sammy Davis, Jr.'s syndicated talk show Sammy and Company which aired from 1975 through 1977. Williams' work on Sammy and Company led to a long-running parody on the Canadian comedy show SCTV (1976–1984), which featured a recurring character named "William B. Williams" (played by John Candy) who was the announcer/sidekick for SCTV's Sammy Maudlin (played by Joe Flaherty). Candy essentially lifted the name and occupation of William B. Williams for this character, but otherwise made no particular attempt to look or sound like the real-life William B. Williams.

From the late 1970s until the mid-1980s, Williams became a TV spokesman for the New York-based Genovese Drug Stores chain, pitching the week's specials and delivering the tagline "A real drug store, and so much more!".

In the last year of his life, in the mid-1980s, Williams hosted Encore, a national radio show syndicated by Westwood One. Williams' episodes were distributed to stations again in 1989 and 1990.

== Friars Club ==
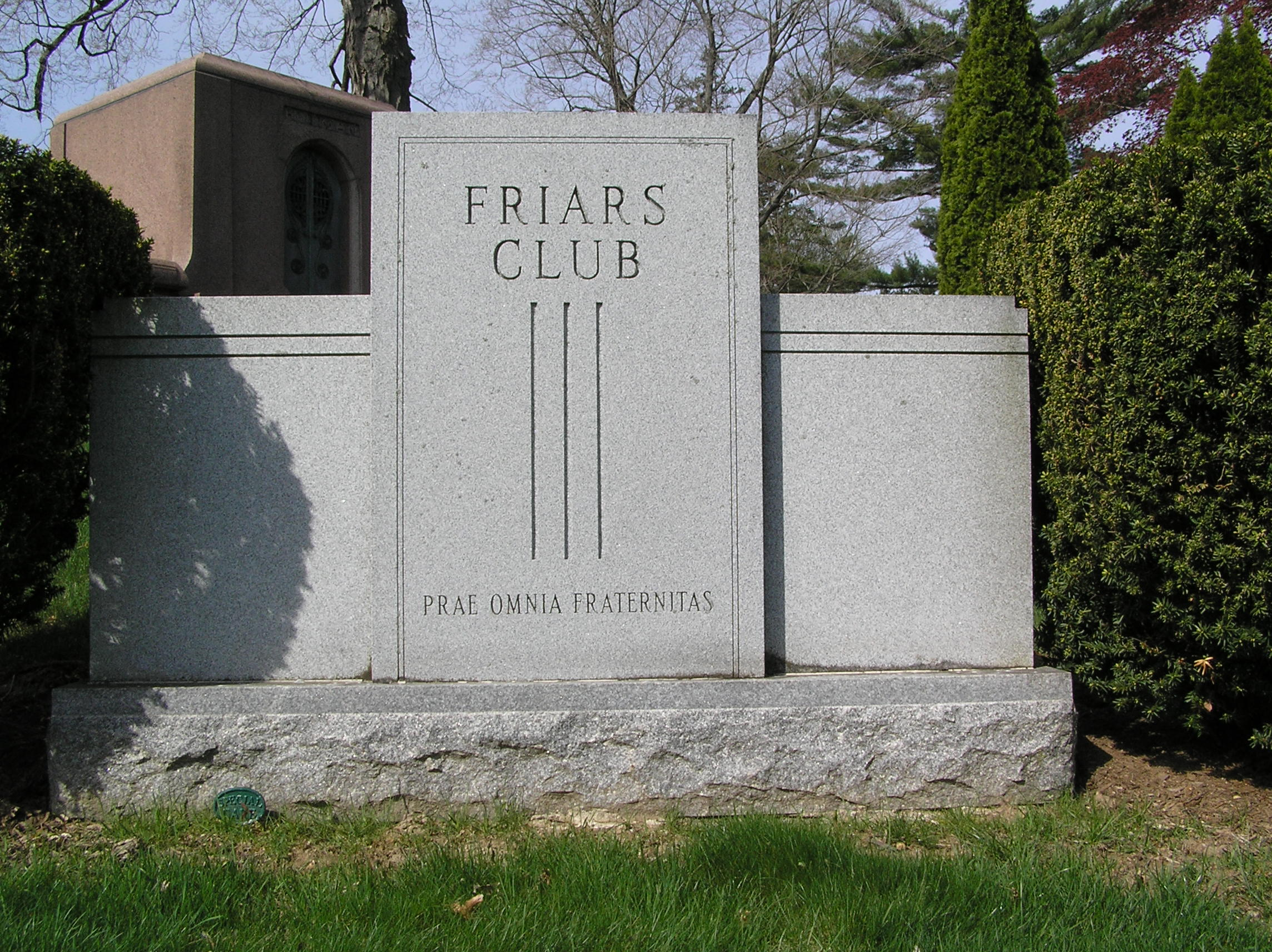
The Friars Club Monument in Kensico Cemetery

Williams was an officer and long-time member of the New York Friars' Club. He was named Man of the Year by the club in 1984 (in a ceremony hosted by Sinatra.) One year later, the Friars Club Foundation made him the recipient of its Applause Award. in recognition of his charitable efforts.

Williams is one of a select group of figures, including Sinatra, George Burns, Billy Crystal and Milton Berle to have a room named for him at the Friars Club in midtown Manhattan.

== Personal ==
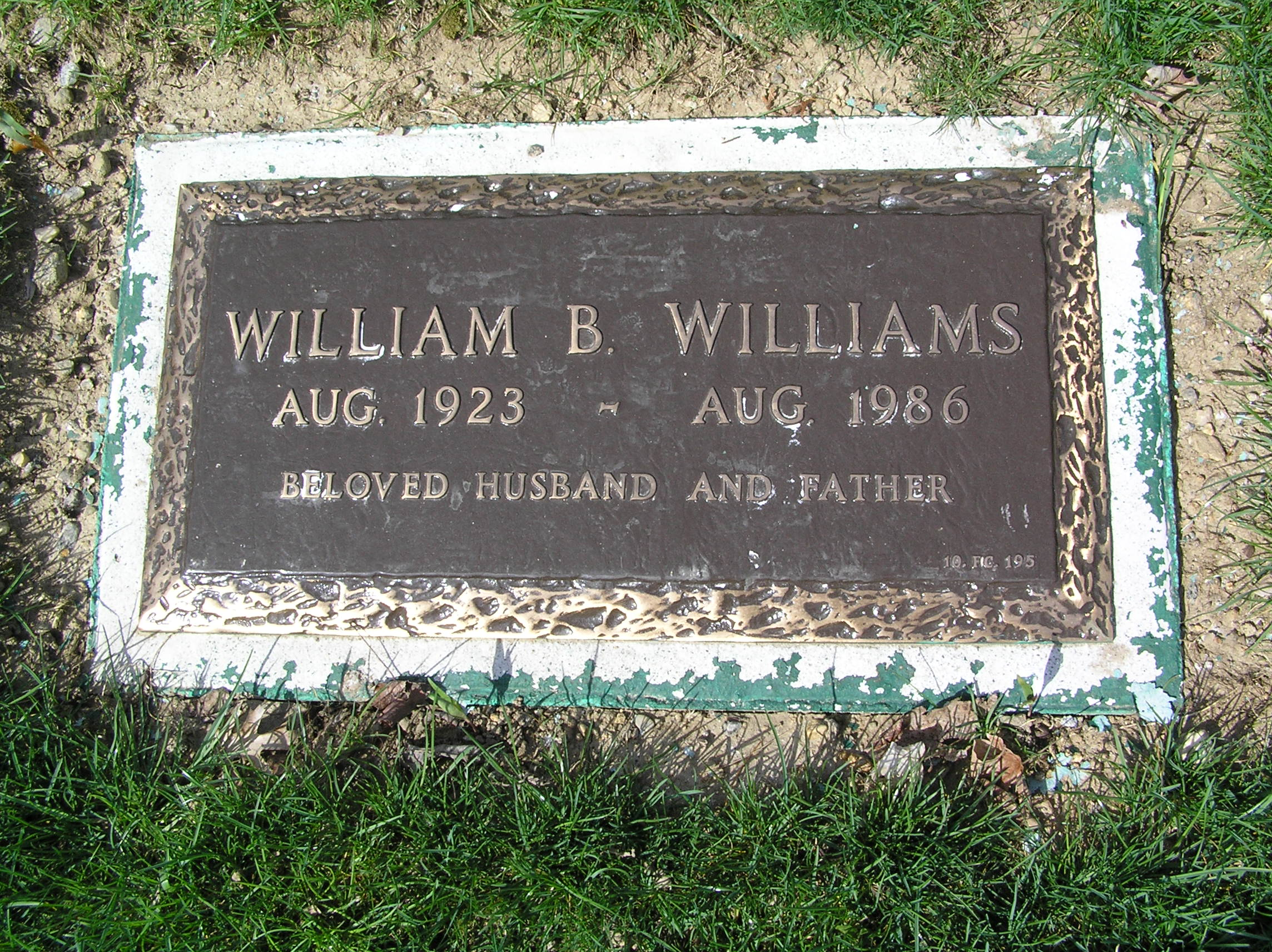
The gravesite of William B. Williams

Williams was married to Dotty Mack, who appeared on radio in Cincinnati in the 1950s as well as a television program carried on the DuMont Television Network. The couple had a son, Jeffrey B. Williams.

In 1985, Williams underwent surgery for colon cancer. He died on August 3, 1986, of acute anemia and respiratory failure, just three days before he would have turned 63. William B. Williams was interred at Kensico Cemetery in Valhalla, New York, in a plot belonging to the Friars Club. In 2006, he was inducted into the Radio Hall of Fame.
