= The Chesterfield Supper Club =

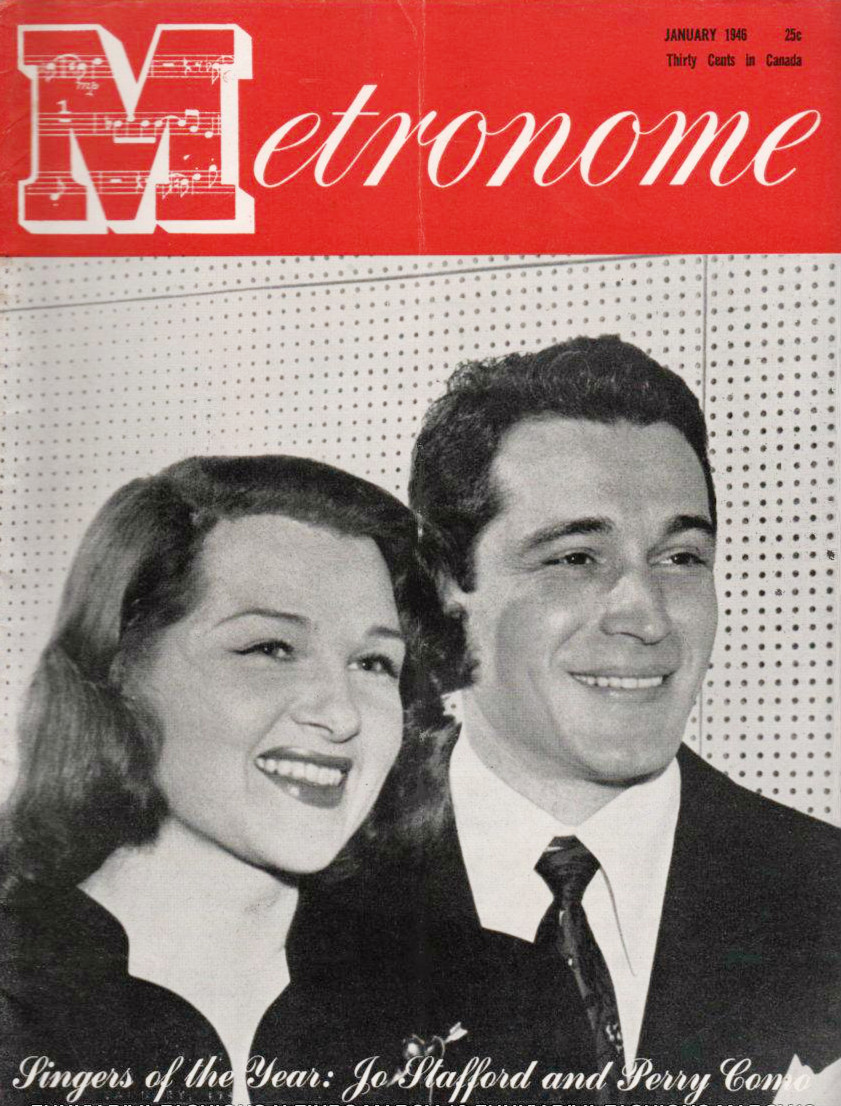
- Perry Como and Jo Stafford pictured on the cover of Metronome (January 1946)
- Genre: Musical variety
- Running time: 15 minute (1944–1948); 30 minutes (1949–1950)
- Country of origin: USA
- Language: English
- Home station: NBC
- TV adaptations: The Chesterfield Supper Club
- Starring: Perry Como; Peggy Lee (1948); Jo Stafford
- Announcer: Martin Block (1944–1950); (1947 from Hollywood); Mel Allen (1947 from New York); Ben Grauer (1948)
- Original release: December 11, 1944 – 1950
- Opening theme: "Smoke Dreams"
- Other themes: "A Cigarette, Sweet Music and You"
- Sponsored by: Chesterfield

The Chesterfield Supper Club is an NBC Radio musical variety program (1944–1950), which was also telecast by NBC Television (1948–1950).

== Radio ==
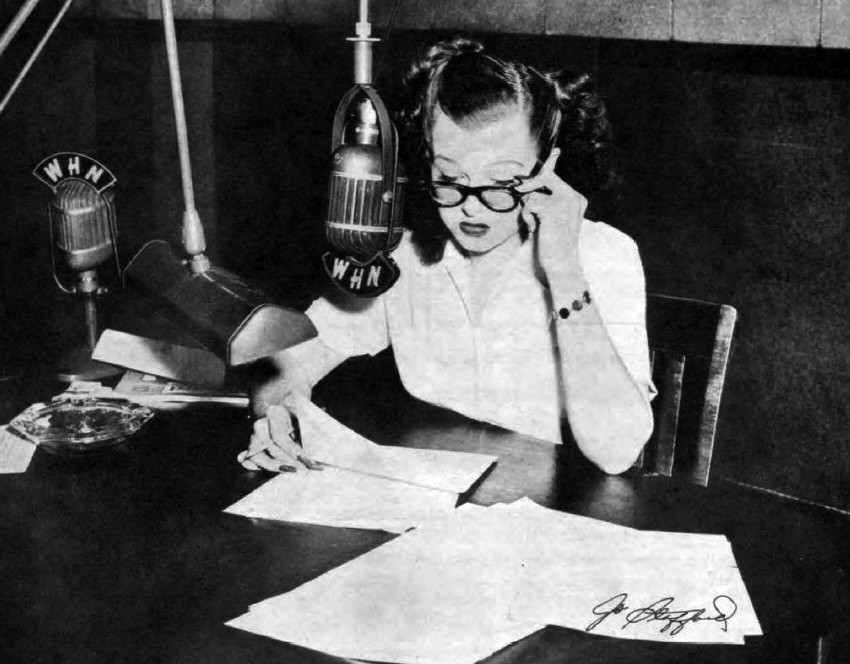
Jo Stafford at her radio show in 1949.

The Chesterfield Supper Club began on December 11, 1944, as a 15-minute radio program, airing at 7 pm weeknights on the NBC Radio Network. This musical variety show was sponsored by Chesterfield cigarettes and featured live musical performances. Perry Como initially hosted The Chesterfield Supper Club five nights a week. Initially, Como's female singer was Mary Ashworth.

The idea for the radio show originated with Doug Storer, who was then an advertising executive with the Blackman Company. Storer had heard Perry Como on his non-sponsored CBS radio program and believed he would do well in a radio show of the type he was proposing. Storer recorded a demo of the radio show with Como as its host and Mitchell Ayres and his Orchestra providing the music. He took the recording to the advertising agency that handled the Chesterfield cigarettes account.

The agency was enthusiastic about the program's format, but did not want Como as its host. The singer the agency preferred was under contract and would need to be released from it before he could accept a job on the new radio program. They asked Storer to get the singer released from his contract. Storer, who was still of the belief that the new show needed Como as its host, did not go through with the advertising agency's request. He received a call from the agency some weeks later, asking about the singer's contract and saying their new program would make its radio debut in about one week's time. Storer told them the right man for the radio show was the one who had made the demo recording-Perry Como. Chesterfield's advertising agency did not have time to do anything but sign Como as the host of the show.

During the first year, Como was backed by the Ted Steele Orchestra, followed by the Lloyd Shaffer Orchestra at the end of 1945 until 1948. With John Klenner, Shaffer and Steele composed the show's theme song, "Smoke Dreams." Roy Ringwald's "A Cigarette, Sweet Music and You" was also used on the show as a musical theme. The Satisfiers vocal group was also part of the program; they also made many records with Como.

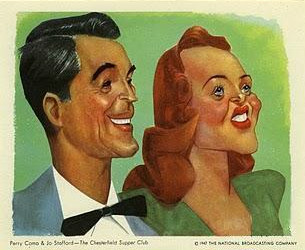
Sam Berman caricature of Como and Stafford, 1947.

Beginning on the show's second anniversary, he hosted the show on Mondays, Wednesdays and Fridays, while Jo Stafford was the host on Tuesdays and Thursdays. Stafford returned to California shortly after becoming a co-host of the program. She began her twice-weekly broadcasts from Hollywood in November 1946, backed by her future husband, Paul Weston. Stafford's Hollywood "Club" broadcasts featured the vocal group The Starlighters; in 1947 she recorded her version of the show's theme song, "Smoke Dreams", with them.

One of the regular features was a "Hollywood Star of the Week" contest where an actor or actress would be featured as a "guest star" singing a song and the listening audience would guess the star's identity for prizes. The "mystery star" contest continued when the show appeared on television.

The broadcasts of April 5, 1946, made from a TWA plane at an altitude of 20,000 feet, are believed to be the first network radio broadcasts from an airplane. Jo Stafford, Perry Como, and the entire staff made the flight. There were two mid-air Supper Club broadcasts: one at 6 pm and another at 10 pm for the West Coast. A total of three flights were made; an earlier rehearsal flight for reception purposes was also made. In addition to the cast and the band's instruments, there was also a small piano on board. The three stand-held microphones brought onto the plane turned out to be less useful than expected. The cast then resorted to hand-held microphones, but the plane's cabin pressure made them very heavy and difficult to hold after a few minutes.

Less than two months after the airborne Supper Club broadcasts, Chesterfield had an idea to take the program on a week of remote broadcasts: flying into Washington, DC for the Monday show, to London, for the Wednesday one and winding up with the Friday night show in Havana. The plan appears to have fallen from favor when it was learned that the taxes which would have been imposed on the Shaffer orchestra as foreign musicians performing in the UK meant Chesterfield would have needed to pay all orchestra members three times the amount of salary they were receiving at the time.

By 1947, announcer Martin Block was based in the Los Angeles area. Block did the announcing from Hollywood on the same days that Stafford hosted the show. Announcer and sportscaster Mel Allen took over the New York announcing duties for that year. When Block's West Coast contract was up, he returned to New York as the show's announcer. Block was also the announcer for the Supper Club television show.

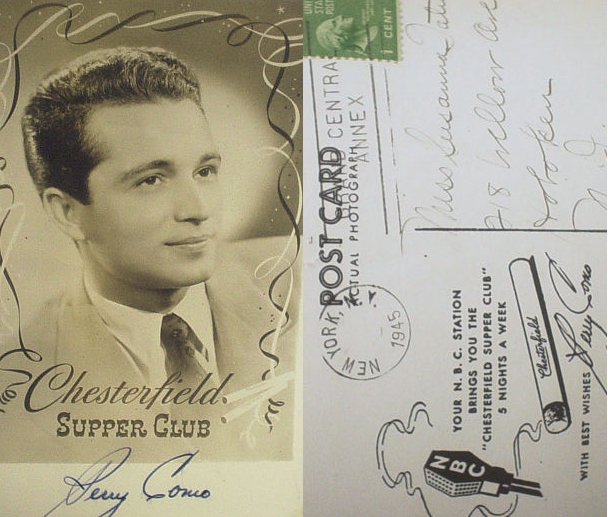
Promotional postcard for the show from 1945.

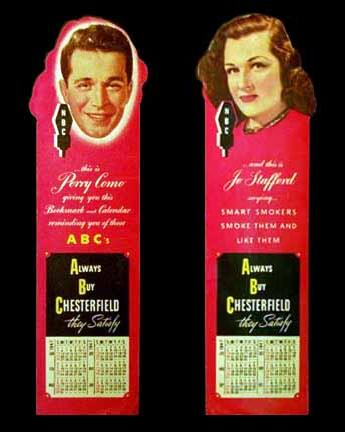
Promotional bookmark/calendar for the show from 1947. Perry Como is shown on one side and Jo Stafford on the other.

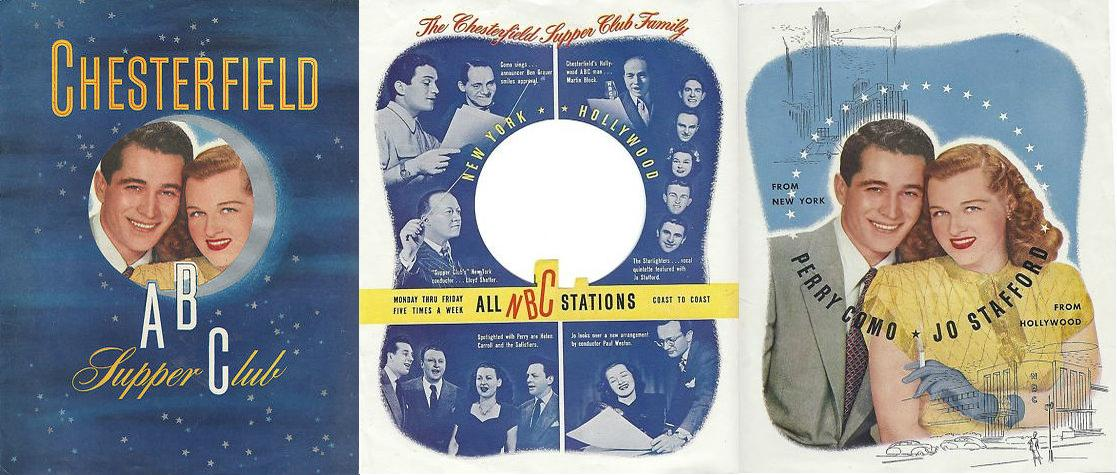
Promotional brochure for the show from 1947.

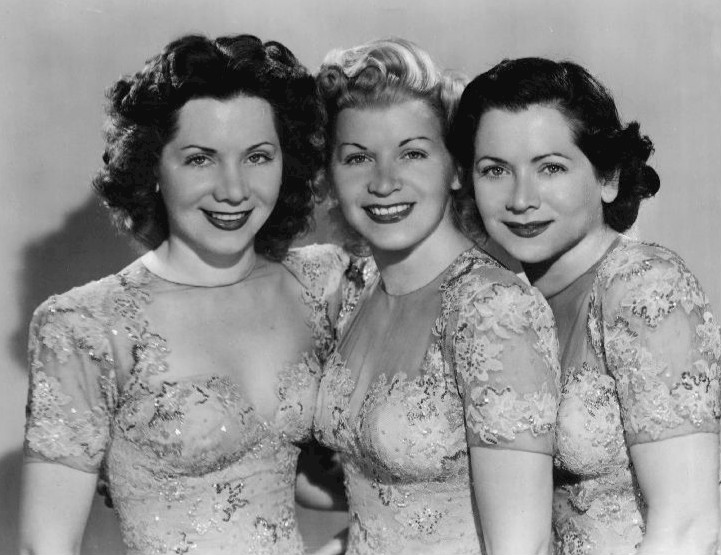
The Fontane Sisters in 1948. From left: Geri, Marge and Bea.

In 1948, singer Peggy Lee was added to the roster, taking over the Thursday broadcast. Como was still broadcasting from New York, now backed by the Mitchell Ayres orchestra. The Satisfiers were replaced by the singing Fontane Sisters, who also appeared with Como on the televised Supper Club and his later television shows.

Both Stafford and Lee broadcast from Hollywood. Stafford continued to be backed by Paul Weston and his orchestra while Peggy Lee was backed by her husband, Dave Barbour, and his orchestra. The show featured musical performances by the host, along with various guest singers and orchestras, including Frank Sinatra, Judy Garland, Eddie Fisher, the Glenn Miller Orchestra, Nat King Cole, Victor Borge and others.

By September 1949, the show's time was extended from 15 minutes to a half-hour, and it was changed from a weekday to a weekly program.

Beginning in February 2010, Sounds of Yesteryear began issuing CDs created from Armed Forces Radio Service (AFRS) transcriptions of the program from the years 1946 and 1947: At the Supper Club, At the Supper Club Part II, and At the Supper Club Part III for Perry Como, At the Supper Club, At the Supper Club Part II, At the Supper Club Part III for Jo Stafford, and At the Supper Club for Peggy Lee.

== Television ==
The Chesterfield Supper Club appeared as a simulcast on NBC Television, beginning Christmas Eve, 1948, with a live performance by Perry Como. This was the beginning of Como's long-standing tradition of television Christmas specials.

Initially, NBC had intended to broadcast three Friday night Supper Club shows on television as well as radio. The experiment had gone well enough for NBC to extend the experimental phase of televising The Chesterfield Supper Club through August 1949.

On September 8, 1949, Supper Club became a regularly scheduled television program. This series was the first of four regular primetime musical variety TV series hosted by Perry Como. He continued to host The Chesterfield Supper Club until 1950, when he moved to CBS and the NBC series ended. However, his association with Chesterfield continued with the Perry Como Chesterfield Show until 1955, when he returned to NBC.
