= Martin Block =

American disk jockey (1903–1967)

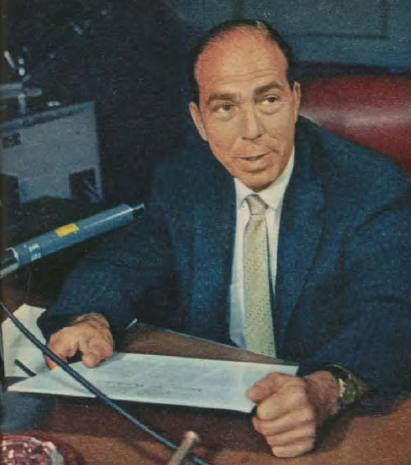
- Block at ABC Radio, 1957
- Born: February 3, 1903; Los Angeles
- Died: September 18, 1967 (aged 64); Englewood, New Jersey
- Presenting career
- Network: NBC; ABC; Mutual Broadcasting System; Voice of America

Martin Block (February 3, 1903 – September 18, 1967) was an American disc jockey. It is said that Walter Winchell invented the term "disc jockey" as a means of describing Block's radio work.

== Career ==
=== Early years ===
A native of Los Angeles, Block began working in radio in Tijuana, Mexico, and then as junior assistant to Al Jarvis at KFWB when he began playing records on the air introducing them with information he'd gleaned from Billboard and Variety, creating the show The World's Largest Make Believe Ballroom. Before that, Block sold small household items and appliances. At the age of only 13, he became an office boy at General Electric. When his career had stalled in Los Angeles, Block moved his family to New York; he was only there for a week before he got an announcing job. Block came up with two famous advertising slogans for his sponsors: "ABC-Always Buy Chesterfield" for Liggett & Myers and "LSMFT"-Lucky Strike Means Fine Tobacco" for Lucky Strike. He was also an avid amateur radio operator with a large station at his home in Englewood, New Jersey.

=== Career break: Make Believe Ballroom ===
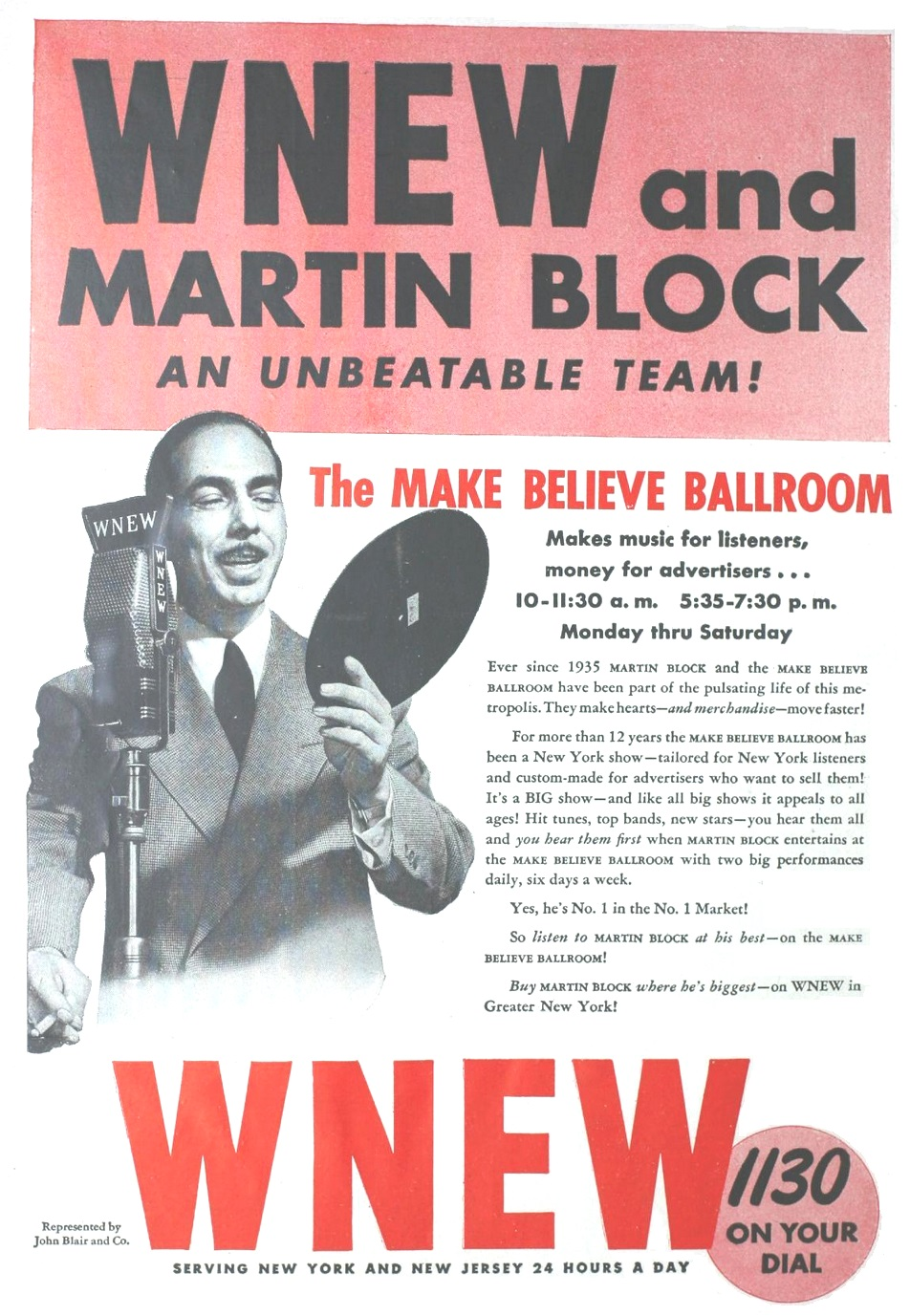
Block's "Make Believe Ballroom" debuted on WNEW in 1935.

In 1934, Block went to work for WNEW at a salary of $20 per week. In 1935, while listeners to New York's WNEW in New York (now information outlet WBBR) were awaiting developments in the Lindbergh kidnapping, Block built his audience by playing records between the Lindbergh news bulletins. This led to his Make Believe Ballroom, which began on February 3, 1935 with Block borrowing both the concept and the title from West Coast disc jockey Al Jarvis, creating the illusion that he was broadcasting from a ballroom with the nation’s top dance bands performing live. He bought some records from a local music shop for the program as the radio station had none. Block purchased five Clyde McCoy records, selecting his "Sugar Blues" for the radio show's initial theme song.

Because Block was told by the station's sales staff that nobody would sponsor a radio show playing music, he had to find himself a sponsor. Block lined up a producer of reducing pills called "Retardo". Within a week of sponsoring the program, the company had over 3,000 responses to the ads on Block's radio show.

Block's style of announcing was considerably different than the usual manner of delivery at the time. Instead of speaking in a voice loud enough to be heard in a theater, Block spoke in a normal voice, as if he was having a one-on-one conversation with a listener. When one of Block's sponsors offered a sale on refrigerators during a New York snowstorm, 109 people braved the elements for the bargain Block advertised; by 1941 potential sponsors for his show had to be put on a waiting list for availabilities.

In 1936, Block and his "Ballroom" inadvertently came to the aid of a young man accused of being a pickpocket. His alibi was that he was home at the time, listening to the show, describing how Guy Lombardo, who was to appear on Make Believe Ballroom, was unable to keep the engagement and sent a telegram, which was read on the air. His story was verified and all charges were dropped. Two years later, current events unwittingly entered the "Make Believe" world with Louis Armstrong singer Midge Williams' renditions of two American popular songs in Japanese. NBC received many telephone calls and telegrams protesting her performance from listeners who were irate over the recent Japanese invasion of China.

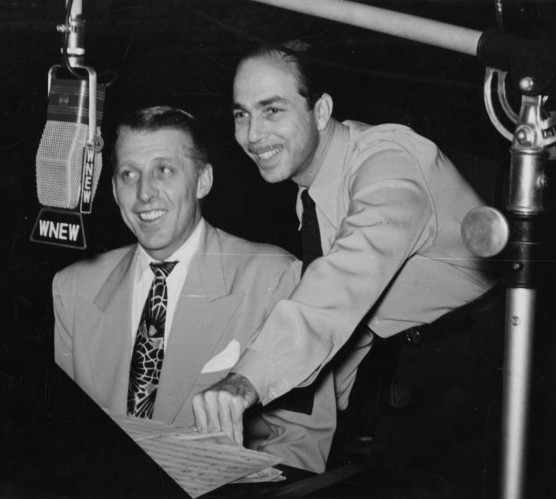
Stan Kenton and Martin Block at WNEW.

Make Believe Ballroom was nationally syndicated in 1940. That same year, Block hosted what was billed as a "$20,000 Jam Session" on the show, featuring artists including both Dorsey brothers, Count Basie, Harry James, and Gene Krupa. The musicians improvised live for a half-hour. One segment of Ballroom was entitled "Saturday Night in Harlem". During this, Cab Calloway, Louis Armstrong, Duke Ellington and other jazz musicians' music was featured. Block and Make Believe Ballroom made the cover of Billboard magazine in April, 1942. During the 1942–44 musicians' strike (also known as the American Federation of Musicians (AFM) recording ban), he was able to obtain new records with full orchestral backing for his program by having friends in England send him UK recordings, as the ban applied to the United States only.

When Spike Jones and his City Slickers returned from entertaining the troops in 1944, the New York hotel room shortage meant the musicians had nowhere to sleep. Jones telephoned Martin Block, who went on the air with the news. WNEW was flooded with listener calls offering to accommodate Jones and his band.

In the 1940s Block hired a young record collector, Joe Franklin, as his "record picker." Franklin went on to host his own radio and television programs in the New York City market for more than 65 years. In 1947, there were two daily editions of the Make Believe Ballroom: one in the late morning and another around dinner time. The illusion was shattered by a 1948 musical short in which Block talked about the show while sitting in front of his extensive record library. He also did a weekly international version of Make Believe Ballroom for Voice of America beginning in 1949. When Block heard that Voice of America would begin broadcasting a popular music program, he volunteered to host the show without pay.

=== Other radio shows and music-related work ===
Block was also the announcer for The Chesterfield Supper Club; some of his other announcing assignments were on Pepper Young's Family, Kay Kyser's radio show and the CBS Hit Parade. In 1945, a busy Block was doing the Supper Club announcing for the first broadcast, going to WNEW for his own Make Believe Ballroom, working on a CBS radio show called Johnnie Johnston three days a week via telephone from WNEW, then returning to Chesterfield Supper Club for the later broadcast for the West Coast. By the end of World War II, Martin Block was making $22,000 a week. He hosted a music show, Columbia Record Shop, for CBS beginning in 1946.

He began a contract with Metro-Goldwyn-Mayer for a series of short musical films, under the umbrella title, Martin Block Presents, in 1947. Both Block and Jarvis appeared in Columbia Pictures' musical comedy feature film, Make Believe Ballroom (1949), with Frankie Laine and other recording artists; the year before, he had a cameo role in Musical Merry-Go-Round with Les Brown.

Though the show continued in New York, Block was imported to Los Angeles by KFWB in 1947 to do Make Believe Ballroom on the West Coast; he returned to New York at the end of his contract. While in California, Block broadcast for Mutual Broadcasting System from a studio he owned in his Encino home. He began doing a program for the network called Block Party with bandleader Ray Block earlier in 1947. Block was also able to continue with Chesterfield Supper Club while in California as the announcer for the Tuesday and Thursday broadcasts from Hollywood with Jo Stafford after she moved there.

On returning from the West Coast, Block continued as the New York announcer for the "Supper Club". He went on to do the announcing for the television version of the program when it began in December, 1948. In 1950, he celebrated his 15th anniversary on the air. Variety devoted an entire section to Block and his career, with many of those who Block helped become stars voicing their thanks.

Block co-wrote the Glenn Miller hit of 1941, "I Guess I'll Have to Dream the Rest". Miller also recorded a version of the Make Believe Ballroom theme, titled "Make Believe Ballroom Time", for which Block wrote the lyrics. He also had his own music publishing companies, Martin Block Music and Embee Music. Block's memory lapse gave a young performer the name she would continue on to fame with. Fannie Rose Shore auditioned for the radio show, singing "Dinah". Block declared Dinah Shore had won the spot on his radio show.

=== After the Ballroom ===
Block left Make Believe Ballroom in 1954 to host The Martin Block Show for ABC Radio, originating from the network's New York flagship WABC. On February 3, 1955, Block was the host of a special program to mark the 20th anniversary of Make Believe Ballroom. The star-studded event was aired in two segments and carried on ABC Radio and ABC-TV. Tickets were sold with all proceeds benefiting the March of Dimes.

While he officially retired from ABC and radio in 1960, he indicated that his retirement merely meant not working in the medium on a regular basis. Towards the end of his career, he was heard on WOR/New York.

In 1962 Martin Block went on to host a weekly fifteen minute radio show called Guard Session. The show was a throw back to Block’s Make Believe Ballroom, as the show was broadcast as a make believe recording studio. Each show typically featured one singer and an accompanying band. The format allowed for two National Guard commercials and aired four tunes by the respective performers. The feature performer appeared for four shows spanning one month of airing. The original shows were highly scripted and somewhat corny, typical for Martin Block. By the end of production in 1967 the show was less scripted and had looser format. The first episode featured Keely Smith and Nelson Riddle. The last episode, show 300 aired on October 29, 1967 featuring Trini Lopez. Block died at an Englewood, New Jersey, hospital September 18, 1967. He was survived by his wife, Joyce, and seven children; six of the children were from previous marriages. In 1988, Martin Block was inducted into the Radio Hall of Fame.

After his departure from WNEW in 1953, the Make Believe Ballroom was hosted by Gerry Marshall and then Art Ford. When Ford left WNEW for opportunities in television in 1958, WNEW DJ William B. Williams hosted the Make Believe Ballroom until his death in 1986. After Williams passing the show was hosted by popular entertainer Steve Allen, beginning in January 1987. Allen hosted the show from both New York and Los Angeles. By April 1984 Steve Allen had made significant changes to the Make Believe Ballroom, Allen stated Make Believe Ballroom is "70 percent comedy and 30 percent music". The shift in emphasis was partly due to his own inclinations as a performer and partly to the presence on the program of Mark Simone, whom Mr. Allen called ”my Ed McMahon.”. The final broadcast of the WNEW Make Believe Ballroom occurred on December 10, 1992, hosted by WNEW-AM DJ Jim Harlan. In the early 21st century New York city disk jockey Claire Stevens launched a new syndicated version of The Make Believe Ballroom via the Triumph Radio Network.
