= Make Believe Ballroom =

American radio program

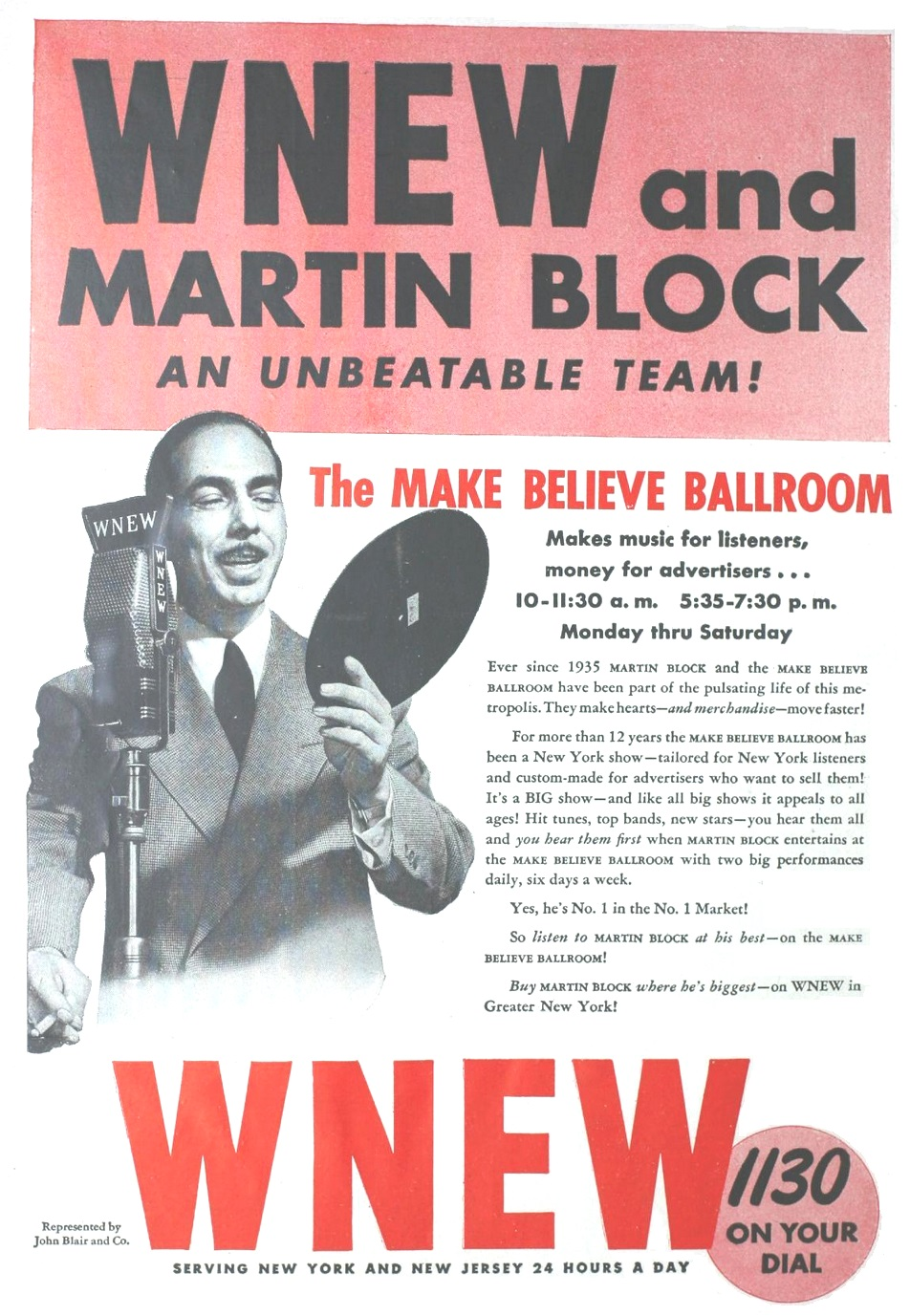
Block's "Make Believe Ballroom" debuted on WNEW in 1935.

Make Believe Ballroom is a long-running radio program which first aired on radio station WNEW in 1935. The show was created as filler by announcer Martin Block to fill in time between news bulletins covering the Lindbergh kidnapping trial. The station did not have access to a live orchestra to play music, so Block played records instead. The concept proved successful and led to the launch of Make Believe Ballroom on February 3, 1935, as a 15-minute experimental program, with Block borrowing both the concept and the title from West Coast disc jockey Al Jarvis, who had launched the similarly named The World's Largest Make Believe Ballroom in 1932, with Block as his assistant. WNEW's program consisted of Block playing records from popular bands and singers with the conceit that they were live performances in an imaginary ballroom. The show expanded its time slot and at one point during Block's tenure attracted 25% of the listening audience in New York City. In 1936, the use of recorded music resulted in a lawsuit initiated by bandleaders Paul Whiteman, Sammy Kaye and Fred Waring who claimed that the playing of records on radio broadcasts was undermining performers' network contracts, which often called for exclusive services. The court ruled that WNEW, after purchasing each record, was allowed to broadcast it regardless of the resistance from artists. WNEW's victory subsequently authorized radio stations across the country to start playing recorded music and brought about the modern radio programming landscape. Make Believe Ballroom was nationally syndicated beginning in 1940 and Block and Make Believe Ballroom made the cover of Billboard magazine in April, 1942. In 1949, the radio show inspired the movie Make Believe Ballroom. Block left Make Believe Ballroom in 1954 to host The Martin Block Show for ABC Radio, originating from the network's New York flagship WABC. Other hosts have included Al Jarvis (who hosted a west coast and television version of the show), William B. Williams, and Steve Allen.

The show continued on WNEW, with a brief interruption in the 1970s when the name was dropped and then restored in 1979, until 1992 when the station changed its format. After leaving WNEW, the show was revived in 1996 by Bill Owen on WVNJ and then on WNSW in Newark, New Jersey where it was hosted by Julius La Rosa in the late 1990s. The show is currently based at WGMC in Rochester, New York, with Jeff Bressler as host, and is heard on public and community radio stations across the United States.

Listening to the show in the 1940s reportedly inspired Casey Kasem to pursue a career as a radio disc jockey and to create the countdown show American Top 40 in 1970.
