= WBBR =

Clear-channel Bloomberg Radio flagship station in New York City

- New York, New York; United States
- Broadcast area: New York metropolitan area
- Frequency: 1130 kHz
- Branding: Bloomberg 11-3-0

Programming
- Language: English
- Format: Financial news
- Network: Bloomberg Radio
- Affiliations: ABC News Radio

Ownership
- Owner: Bloomberg L.P.; (Bloomberg Communications Inc.)

History
- First air date: April 10, 1922
- Former call signs: WAAM (1922–1934); WODA (1925–1934); WNEW (1934–1992)
- Call sign meaning: Bloomberg Business Radio

Technical information
- Licensing authority: FCC
- Facility ID: 5869
- Class: A (clear-channel)
- Power: 50,000 watts
- Transmitter coordinates: 40°48′39.96″N 74°2′22.51″W

Links
- Public license information: Public file; LMS
- Webcast: Listen live (via iHeartRadio)
- Website: www.bloombergradio.com

WBBR (1130 AM) is a clear-channel radio station licensed to serve New York, New York, United States. It serves as the flagship station of Bloomberg Radio, Bloomberg L.P.'s radio service, offering general and financial news reports 24-hours a day, along with local information and interviews with corporate executives, economists, and industry analysts.

WBBR broadcasts with 50,000 watts, the maximum authorized power for AM stations, from a four-tower antenna array located in Carlstadt, New Jersey. A single tower is used during the day, at night, power is fed to all four towers in a directional pattern to protect KWKH in Shreveport, Louisiana, the other Class A station at 1130 AM. Even with this restriction, it can be heard across much of the Eastern United States and Canada, but is strongest in the Northeast. Studios are located at 731 Lexington Avenue ("Bloomberg Tower") in Midtown Manhattan.

== History ==
=== Early years as WNEW: 1930s–1940s ===
WNEW was created by consolidation of two existing New York City-area stations that were sharing time on 1250 kHz: WAAM in Newark, New Jersey, and WODA in Paterson, New Jersey. WAAM was first licensed on April 10, 1922, to the I. R. Nelson Company in Newark. WODA was initially licensed in April 1925, to the James K O'Dea Radio and Victrola Shop, 115 Ellison Street in Paterson.

WNEW debuted February 13, 1934, as "New York's newest radio station", and with new call sign representing its city of license, NEWark, NEW Jersey. The station had rights to 6/7ths time, with the other 1/7th time assigned to WHBI. WNEW was known for its popular adult music selection as well as its staff of radio personalities (including Martin Block, Dee Finch, Gene Rayburn, Gene Klavan, Al "Jazzbo" Collins, Ted Brown and William B. Williams), as well as for developing modern morning radio. In addition to its music and entertainment programming, WNEW featured an award-winning news staff and became "The Voice of New York Sports" for its coverage of New York Giants football team as well as the New York Rangers hockey and New York Knicks basketball.

WNEW was acquired in 1934 by advertising executive Milton H. Biow and watch manufacturer Arde Bulova, under the name The Greater New York Broadcasting Company. It also acquired the Manhattan studios at 501 Madison Avenue which had been constructed for the recently failed Amalgamated Broadcasting System. New York socialite Bernice Judis was hired as WNEW's first general manager, making her a rare female executive during the "Golden Age of Radio". The call sign remained the same, to represent "the NEWest thing in radio". The new owners moved the license to New York City, though for all intents and purposes it had been a New York City station since its launch.

As an independent radio station, WNEW lacked the funds larger networks National Broadcasting Company, Columbia Broadcasting System and Mutual Broadcasting System used to produce daily programming, such as comedy shows, soap operas, game shows and dramatic programs. However, Judis was not discouraged, and welcomed the opportunity to develop her own schedule of innovative programming that included creating the first all-night radio show, dubbed Stan Shaw's Milkman's Matinee, and cultivating a line-up of popular morning radio show personalities.

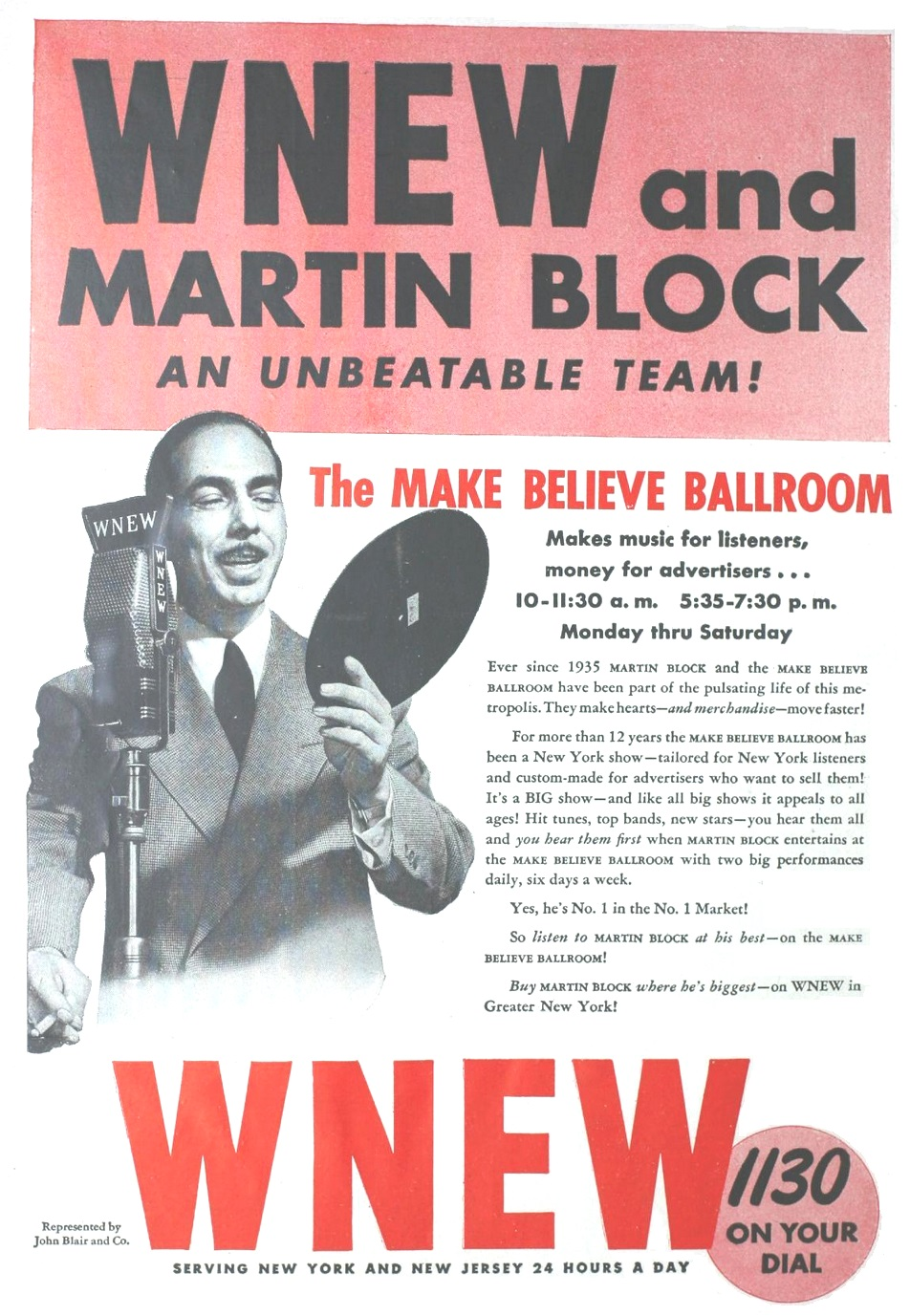
Martin Block's "Make Believe Balltoom" debuted on WNEW in 1935.

In 1935, WNEW pioneered the concept of a disc jockey when staff announcer Martin Block needed to fill time between news bulletins during his coverage of the Lindbergh kidnapping trial of Bruno Hauptmann. Block did not have access to a live orchestra to play music during the breaks as most network stations did, so he played records instead. Soon afterward, he piloted a 15-minute experimental show called the Make Believe Ballroom, during which he played records from popular bands and singers, posed as a live performance in an imaginary ballroom. During Block's tenure as host of Make Believe Ballroom, the show attracted 25% of the listening audience in New York City. The show continued in sporadic runs until the station's end in 1992.

In 1936, as the popularity of recorded music grew, WNEW was the defendant in a lawsuit initiated by bandleaders Paul Whiteman, Sammy Kaye and Fred Waring. They claimed that the playing of records on radio broadcasts was undermining performers' network contracts, which often called for exclusive services. The court ruled that WNEW, after purchasing each record, was allowed to broadcast it regardless of the resistance from artists. WNEW's victory subsequently authorized radio stations across the country to start playing recorded music and brought about the modern radio programming landscape.

As of January 1, 1940, WNEW was licensed on 1250 kHz for 2,500 watts by day, and 1,000 watts at night. On March 29, 1941, the North American Regional Broadcasting Agreement (NARBA) went into effect, which moved the stations on 1250 kHz to 1280 kHz, with WNEW now authorized for 5,000 watts both day and night.

=== November 12, 1941, call letter swap between WNEW and WOV ===
In late 1941, stations WNEW and WOV traded identities, with the call letters and programming of WOV moving from 1130 to WNEW's 1280 kHz assignment, while WNEW did the reverse, with its call letters and programming moving from 1280 to WOV's 1130 kHz assignment. The FCC approved the call sign changes on November 12, 1941, and the transfer was finalized on December 1, 1941, consisting of an "exchange of power, call letters and transmitting equipment between WOV and WNEW". Thus, following this exchange, the WNEW call letters were now used on the station at 1130 kHz, with a boost to 10,000 watts full-time.

In 1942, Judis set up a broadcast desk at the New York Daily News and WNEW became one of the first stations to carry hourly newscasts, something that would become commonplace in the industry over the next 15 years. The station ended its association with the Daily News in 1958 and went on to build its own news department with 13 reporters and writers.

=== 1950s ===
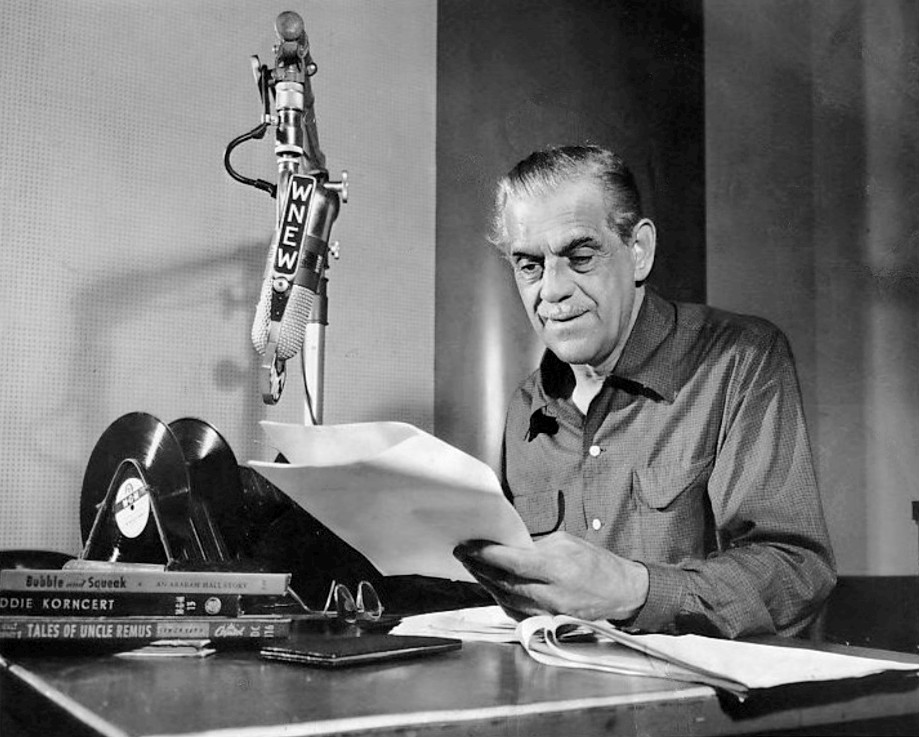
Boris Karloff hosted a weekly children's radio program on WNEW in the early 1950s. The program also became popular with adults.

WNEW was acquired in March 1954, by a group led by Richard D. Buckley, the future founder of Buckley Broadcasting. Less than eighteen months later, in October 1955, the station changed hands again with Buckley joining two new partners, television producer and investor Jack Wrather and banker John L. Loeb. Then, in March 1957, WNEW was purchased by the DuMont Broadcasting Corporation, the former owner of the DuMont Television Network; the sale to DuMont made WNEW a sister station to former DuMont network flagship WABD (channel 5). The TV station changed its call letters to WNEW-TV in 1958, and DuMont Broadcasting would later evolve into Metromedia.

Through the 1950s and 1960s, WNEW's programming was largely based on a personality-driven format, with a line-up of DJs who were ground-breaking at the time. Comedian Dee Finch teamed up with Gene Rayburn, and later Gene Klavan, on the long-running morning show Anything Goes. It often playfully mocked its own advertisers, who in turn were still eager to have their products touted on the popular show.

During this time, pop music was dividing between rock and roll and popular standards. Some stations moved to a predominantly rock and roll format and became known as "Top 40" stations, where the best-selling songs were played frequently, while others played popular adult standards, along with the softer hits from the current charts, earning the name "Middle of the Road" or MOR for short. DJs Ted Brown, Al "Jazzbo" Collins and William B. Williams helped define the MOR musical character of WNEW, lending their own "professionalism and elegance" to popular standards music.

=== 1960s ===
The news department at WNEW flourished in the late 1950s and early 1960s, and was considered among the best news operations at an independent radio station. WNEW sent reporters around the world to places like Cuba to interview Fidel Castro and to Africa to interview medical missionary Albert Schweitzer. In 1960, the station won a Peabody Award and an Associated Press Award for the best regularly scheduled news program in New York. Aerospace author Martin Caidin anchored live broadcasts for WNEW during early American space launches in the 1960s, traveling to Cape Canaveral to report on-site.

Long-time general manager Bernice Judis left WNEW in 1959, and was replaced by John Van Buren Sullivan, who started the station's affiliation with the New York Giants football team in 1960. Since home games were blacked out on television, as much as 60% of the New York radio audience relied on WNEW for play-by-play game coverage. WNEW later aired Mets, Rangers and Knicks games, as "The Voice of New York Sports" for more than 30 years.

By the mid-1960s, contemporary artists like Bobby Vinton, Connie Francis, Wayne Newton, Steve Lawrence, Andy Williams and Dinah Washington were added, as well as softer songs by rock artists like Elvis Presley, The Beatles, The Association, The 5th Dimension and Petula Clark were heard. The station also played a couple of big band songs from the 1930s and 1940s per hour. Beginning in 1965, WNEW cut back on big bands, playing them only occasionally. The station also cut back on standards artists, airing them about four times each hour. The airstaff was ordered to stop playing standards and big bands from their own personal collections and were ordered to remove them from the station. WNEW focused more on soft rock and played more charting hits on the Adult Contemporary music charts.

=== 1970s–1980s ===
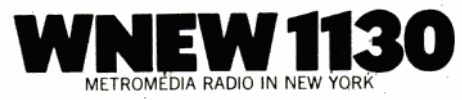
WNEW logo used from c. 1969 to the 1970s.

The 1970s marked a period of decline for WNEW as listeners' musical tastes continued to evolve. The station struggled to maintain an adult pop standards audience that was being replaced by an expanding youth market. In an effort to attract at least some younger listeners, WNEW continued to air softer Top 40 hits, despite resistance from established DJs like William B. Williams, who helped build WNEW's pop standards tradition. In 1971, WNEW shifted its programming again and evolved into a full service adult contemporary format. The station also cut back on music during morning and afternoon drive times. The Milkman's Matinee name for overnight broadcasts was shelved for a time. The program director fired anyone who was rumored to have objected to the changes, including longtime sportscaster Marty Glickman. Marv Albert was brought in to replace Glickman. Still, the station played a couple standards per hour and a big band song every few hours but also played many soft to mid-tempo top 40 hits one would not expect to hear on a MOR station. WNEW was classified by trade publications as Adult Contemporary and Pop Adult. Many of the current songs were AC only hits. Also, WNEW played a moderate amount of 50s and 60s rock and roll artists, along with some Motown hits. WNEW also had "Million Dollar Weekends" focusing on oldies from the 50s and 60s along with an occasional standard.

With FM radio taking a larger share of young listeners, WNEW as an AM station opted to return to its roots in pop standards in 1976, reinstating Milkman's Matinee on overnights. In October 1979, Make Believe Ballroom was reinstated in middays. Initially, the station mixed in additional big bands and standards in with the AC format. In 1980, WNEW slowly began reducing AC hits. Later in the fall, the station went to all big bands and standards with the exception of morning and afternoon drive times. Million Dollar Weekends also became strictly Standards and Big Bands. In January 1981 WNEW converted to big bands and standards 24 hours a day and deepened the selection of songs.

By 1981, WNEW focused on album cuts by standards artists. The morning show focused on more hit based easy listening standards with some big bands mixed in. Middays played music from the 1930s and 1940s, with a mix of big bands and crooners. Afternoons concentrated on a mix of deep cuts by vocalists along with some big bands. Late nights featured traditional jazz. On overnights, WNEW launched a jazz show in 1986, blending traditional, modern and smooth jazz.

WNEW was separated from its television sister station in March 1986, when WNEW-TV and Metromedia's other television outlets came under the ownership of Fox Broadcasting Company, then owned by 20th Century Fox and controlled by Rupert Murdoch. Two years later in 1988, WNEW went through a major ownership change as Metromedia sold the station to Westwood One for $22 million. Westwood One then sold a half-interest to media entrepreneur Robert F. X. Sillerman for $11 million, while retaining operational control.

Even with new additions to programming such as Larry King's overnight radio show, the station's ratings continued to decline. Westwood One was forced to cut costs and downsize staff in an effort to attract potential buyers. By 1988, WNEW began to focus on bigger hits by standards artists. The music focused more on 50s and 60s easy listening artists. In 1990, WNEW began mixing in soft hits by baby boomer pop artists such as Neil Diamond, The Carpenters, The Righteous Brothers, Carole King, Barry Manilow, Lionel Richie and Linda Ronstadt. Late in 1991, WNEW backed off this type of music and focused again on traditional standards artists. WNEW continued cutting staff and local news in an attempt to remain profitable.

=== Under Bloomberg ===
WBBR logo from c. 2017 to October 2022

WNEW was put up for sale in 1991, with Bloomberg L.P. agreeing to purchase the station for $13.5 million in August 1992. In the period before the format change, the airstaff was given an opportunity to say goodbye, culminating on December 10 and 11, 1992, when the station had one big farewell show. During this farewell show, the airstaff remembered WNEW highlights and talked about the end of an era. The show ended at 8:15 p.m. on the 11th, as Mark Simone signed off for the last time with the entire current and many living former personalities at his side. The last two songs played were by Frank Sinatra: "Here's That Rainy Day" and "We'll Meet Again". WNEW joined NBC Talknet in progress, followed by Larry King as usual.

After Larry King, beginning at 2:00 am. Saturday, WNEW began simulcasting WYNY for three days. The station broke away only for New York Giants football, Talknet, and Larry King. On December 15, the sale of WNEW to Bloomberg became final, with the station continuing to simulcast WYNY until 4:00 pm. After airing the Perry Como Christmas Special, shows from Talknet, and the first hour of Larry King, the station signed off at 11:59 pm. The airing of The Larry King Show ended abruptly and the pre-recorded voice of engineering director Alan Kirschner was broadcast, stating: "At this time, 1130 WNEW New York will leave the air forever. Thanks for your support over the years. This is WNEW, New York."

At the transmitter site, engineer Rene Tetro then turned off the transmitter for two minutes, switching to the new feed from the Bloomberg offices. The station signed back on the air at 12:01 am, with the new call sign WBBR, and began simulcasting WQEW (1560 AM), then owned by The New York Times. In anticipation of the end of WNEW, WQEW had begun broadcasting a standards format some two weeks earlier. Over the next several weeks, WQEW asked listeners to 1130 to switch to 1560. The simulcast ended at 5 am on January 4, 1993, when WBBR's business news format debuted.

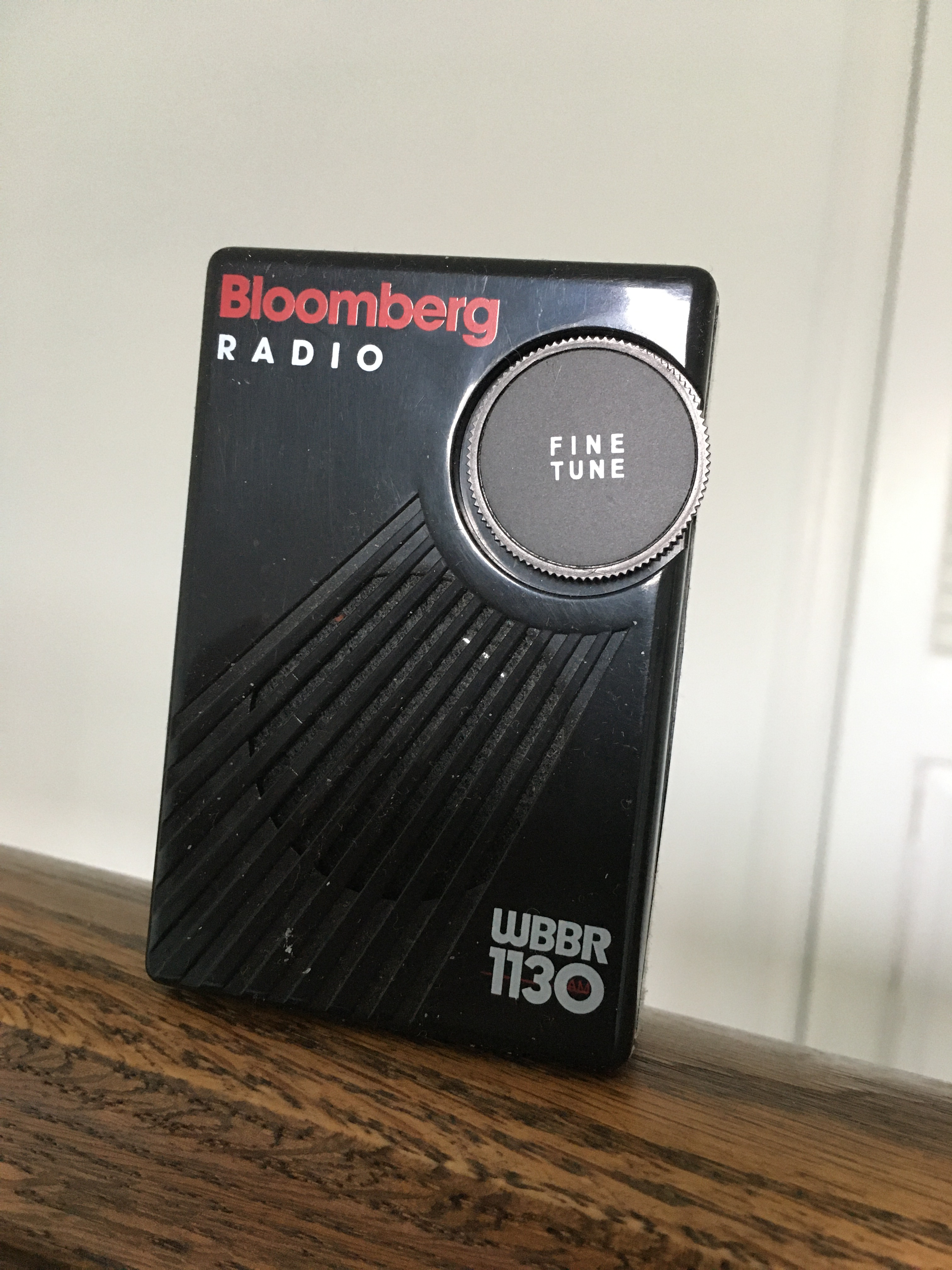
A transistor radio promoting WBBR

In October 2000, WBBR announced a shift from business news to a general all-news radio format, competing against WCBS (880 AM) and WINS (1010 AM); a fourth all-news station, WNNY (1380 AM), offered a Spanish-language version of the format. Ahead of this shift, WBBR, which had largely operated off of a hard drive since its 1993 launch, moved to a live presentation from 6 am to 6 pm; it also hired several former WCBS and WINS staffers, with morning drive being co-anchored by former WCBS anchor Ben Farnsworth. Bloomberg also gave out 1.2 million radios to promote the station. Following the shift, WBBR's ratings remained below that of WINS and WCBS; in November 2001, Bloomberg announced the station would return to an emphasis on business news, though it denied the move had any connection to Michael Bloomberg, the company's owner, becoming New York City's mayor. By March 2002, WBBR's programming during non-market hours began to emphasize talk shows, with hosts that included Caroline Baum, Ellis Henican, Jim Cramer, and Ed Koch.

== See also ==
- List of initial AM-band station grants in the United States

Preceded by 1050 WHN; 1972–1974	Radio Home of the New York Mets; 1975–1977 (as WNEW-AM)	Succeeded by WMCA 570; 1978–1982
