= Betty White filmography =

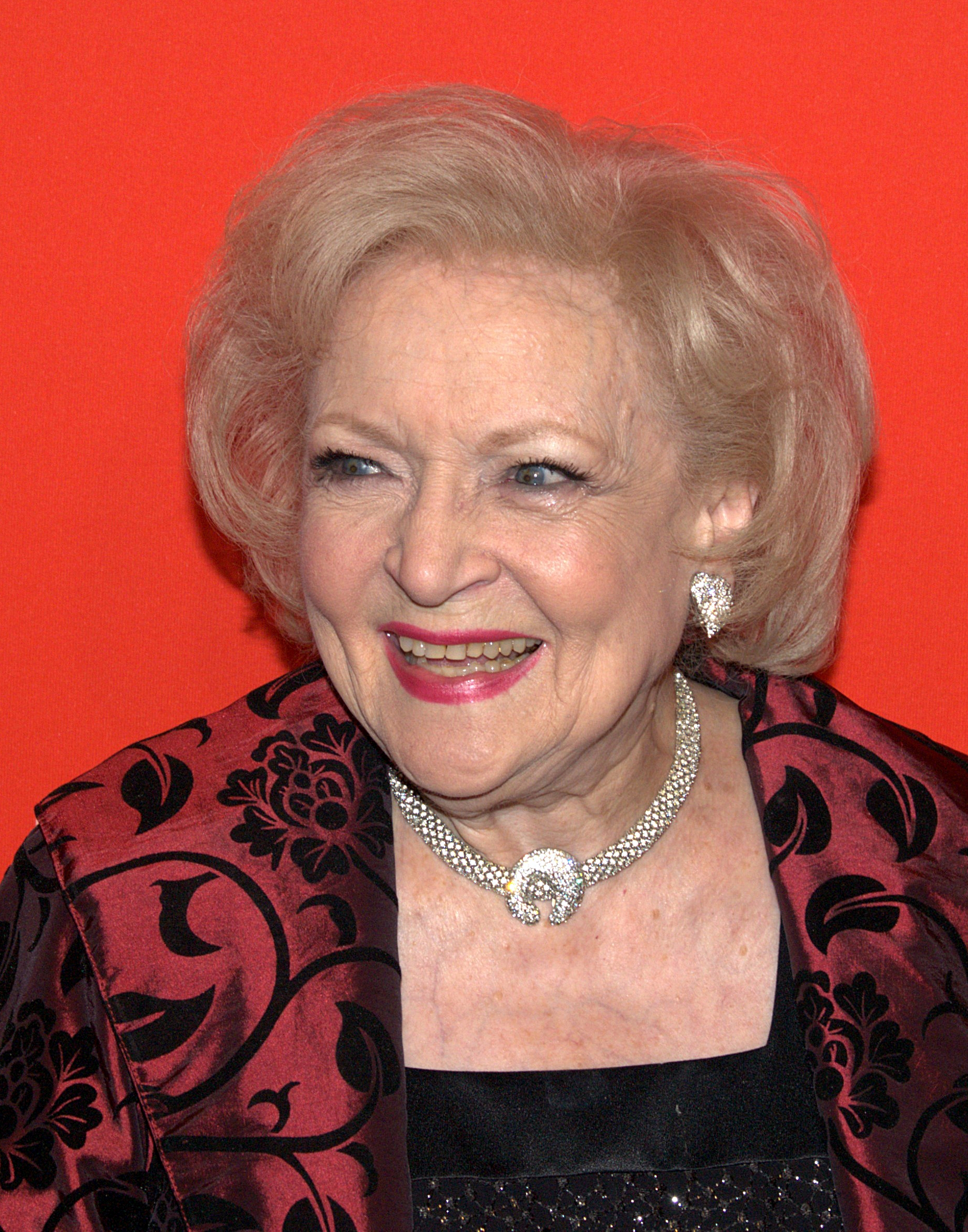
White at the Time 100 gala in 2010

Betty White (January 17, 1922 – December 31, 2021) was an American actress and comedian known for her roles on television. White worked longer in the television industry than anyone else and earned herself a Guinness World Record in 2013.

Her roles on television including Sue Ann Nivens on the CBS sitcom The Mary Tyler Moore Show (1973–1977), Rose Nylund on the NBC sitcom The Golden Girls (1985–1992), and Elka Ostrovsky on the TV Land sitcom Hot in Cleveland (2010–2015). She gained renewed popularity after her appearance in the romantic comedy film The Proposal (2009) with Sandra Bullock and Ryan Reynolds, and went on to host Saturday Night Live in 2010 gaining her a Primetime Emmy Award for Outstanding Guest Actress in a Comedy Series. She had also been a staple on many game shows since the mid-1950s.

White died on December 31, 2021, aged 99, which was due to be celebrated in a televised special on January 17, 2022. It contained an interview from White, filmed just ten days prior to her death. The decision was made to continue with the televised celebration posthumously, thus ending White's record-breaking, 73-year career on television in 2022.

== Film ==
Year	Title	Role	Notes	Ref.
1945	Time to Kill	Lou's Girl	Short film	
1951	The Daring Miss Jones	Unknown		
1962	Advise & Consent	Senator Bessie Adams		
1986	Big City Comedy	Herself		
1989	Hanna-Barbera's 50th: A Yabba Dabba Doo Celebration	Herself		
1996	The Story of Santa Claus	Gretchen Claus	Voice	
1998	Hard Rain	Doreen Sears		
1998	Dennis the Menace Strikes Again	Martha Wilson	Direct-to-video	
1998	Holy Man	Herself		
1999	Lake Placid	Mrs. Delores Bickerman		
1999	The Story of Us	Lillian Jordan		
2000	Whispers: An Elephant's Tale	Round	Voice	
2000	Tom Sawyer	Aunt Polly	Voice	
2001	The Retrievers	Mrs. Krisper		
2001	The Wild Thornberrys: The Origin of Donnie	Grandma Sophie	Voice	
2003	Bringing Down the House	Mrs. Kline		
2003	Return to the Batcave: The Misadventures of Adam and Burt	Cameo		
2005	The Third Wish	Lettie		
2006	Where's Marty?	Herself		
2007	Your Mommy Kills Animals	Herself	Documentary	
2007	In Search of Puppy Love	Herself	Documentary	
2008	Ponyo	Yoshie	Voice	
2009	Love N' Dancing	Irene		
2009	The Proposal	Grandma Annie		
2009	Part Two: The Warm Mission	Betty	Short film	
2010	You Again	Grandma Bunny Byer		
2010	Prep & Landing: Operation: Secret Santa	Mrs. Claus	Voice	
2011	Betty White: Champion for Animals	Herself	Documentary	
2012	The Lorax	Grammy Norma	Voice	
2013	Letters to Jackie: Remembering President Kennedy	Narrator	Documentary	
2013	Betty White Goes Wild	Herself	Documentary	
2019	Toy Story 4	Bitey White	Voice	
2019	Trouble	Mrs. Sarah Vanderwhoozie	Voice	
2022	Betty White: A Celebration	Herself / Archive footage	Docu-movie; posthumous release; final film role	

== Television ==
Year	Title	Role	Notes	Ref.
1949–53	Hollywood on Television	Herself		
1952–54	The Betty White Show	Herself		
1953	The Eddie Albert Show	Herself		
1953–55	Life with Elizabeth	Elizabeth	Lead role, 65 episodes	
1955–56	What's My Line?	Herself	8 episodes	
1956	The Millionaire	Virginia Lennart	Episode: "Millionaire Virginia Lennart"	
1957–58	Date with the Angels	Vickie Angel	Lead role, 33 episodes	
1958	The Betty White Show	Herself	Lead role, 14 episodes	
1958–62	The Tonight Show with Jack Paar	Herself	Recurring role, 36 episodes	
1958–2001, 2016	To Tell the Truth	Herself	Guest on CBS (Collyer), NBC (Moore), and ABC (Anderson). Main panelist (2016)	
1961–2008	(Super) (Million Dollar) Password (All Stars), (Plus)	Herself	Recurring panelist; appeared on all versions of the show	
1962	The United States Steel Hour		Episode: "Scene of the Crime"	
1963–82, 1990–91	Match Game	Herself	Recurring panelist Appeared on the first 3 versions of the show	
1963–75	You Don't Say!	Herself	Recurring panelist, 10 episodes	
1968	That's Life		Episode: "Buying a House"	
1969	Petticoat Junction	Adelle Colby	Episode: "The Cannonball Bookmobile"	
1971	The Pet Set	Herself	Recurring role, 31 episodes	
1971	Vanished	Herself	NBC TV mini series	
1972	O'Hara, U.S. Treasury	Herself	Episode: "Operation: Lady Luck"	
1972	The Odd Couple	Herself	Episode: "Password"	
1973–77	The Mary Tyler Moore Show	Sue Ann Nivens	Main cast, 46 episodes	
1975	Lucas Tanner	Lydia Merrick	Episode: "The Noise of a Quiet Weekend"	
1975	Ellery Queen	Louise Demery	Episode: "The Adventure of Miss Aggie's Farewell Performance"	
1975	The Carol Burnett Show	Various	Recurring role, 3 episodes	
1976–77	The Sonny and Cher Show	Herself	Guest role, 2 episodes	
1976–79	Liar's Club	Herself	Recurring panelist, 48 episodes	
1977–78	The Betty White Show	Joyce Whitman	Lead role, 14 episodes	
1978	The Hanna-Barbera Happy Hour	Voice teacher	1 episode	
1978	Snavely (aka Chateau Snavely)	Gladys Snavely	1 episode (pilot only)	
1978	With This Ring	Evelyn Harris	TV film	
1979	The Best Place to Be	Sally Cantrell	TV film	
1979	Before and After	Anita	TV film	
1980	The Gossip Columnist	Herself	TV film	
1980	The Love Boat	Various	Guest role, 5 episodes	
1981	Best of the West		Episode: "Mail Order Bride"	
1982	Eunice	Ellen	TV film	
1982	The $25,000 Pyramid	Herself	Recurring panelist, 85 episodes	
1982	Love, Sidney	Charlotte	Episode: "Charlotte's Web"	
1982	Madame's Place	Herself	Episode: "I Am What I Am"	
1983	Just Men!	Herself	Host, 65 episodes	
1983	Fame	Catherine	Episode: "Sunshine Again"	
1983–84, 1986	Mama's Family	Ellen Harper Jackson	Recurring role, 15 episodes	
1984	Hotel	Wilma Klein	Episode: "Outsiders"	
1984	Trivia Trap	Herself	Celebrity Week	
1985	St. Elsewhere	Capt. Gloria Neal	2 episodes	
1985	Who's the Boss?	Bobby Barnes	2 episodes	
1985–92	The Golden Girls	Rose Nylund	Main role, 180 episodes	
1987	Alf Loves a Mystery	Aunt Harriet	TV film	
1988	Santa Barbara	Cameo	Guest role, 3 episodes	
1988	Another World	Brenda Barlowe	Special Guest Star	
1988	Days of Our Lives	Cameo	Guest role	
1989–92	Empty Nest	Rose Nylund	Guest role, 3 episodes	
1990	Carol & Company	Trisha Durant	Episode: "Trisha Springs Eternal"	
1991	Chance of a Lifetime	Evelyn Eglin	TV film	
1991	Nurses	Rose Nylund	Episode: "Begone with the Wind"	
1992–93	The Golden Palace	Rose Nylund	Lead role, 24 episodes	
1993	Bob	Sylvia Schmidt	Main role, 8 episodes	
1994	Diagnosis: Murder	Dora Sloan	Episode: "Death by Extermination"	
1995	The Naked Truth	Herself	2 episodes	
1995–96	Maybe This Time	Shirley Wallace	Main role, 18 episodes	
1996	A Weekend in the Country	Martha	TV film	
1996	Suddenly Susan	Midge Haber	Episode: "Golden Girl Friday"	
1996	The John Larroquette Show	Herself	Episode: "Here We Go Again"	
1998	The Lionhearts	Dorothy (voice)	5 episodes	
1998	L.A. Doctors	Mrs. Brooks	Episode: "Leap of Faith"	
1998	Noddy	Annabelle (Mrs. Santa Claus)	Special: Anything Can Happen At Christmas	
1999	Hercules	Hestia (voice)	Episode: "Hercules and the Tiff on Olympus"	
1999	Ally McBeal	Dr. Shirley Flott	Episode: "Seeing Green"	
1999	King of the Hill	Dorothy / Ellen / Delia (voice)	Guest role, 3 episodes	
1999–2001	Ladies Man	Mitzi Stiles	Main role, 30 episodes	
2000	The Wild Thornberrys	Sophie Hunter (voice)	3 episodes	
2000	Intimate Portrait	Herself	Episode: "Betty White"	
2000	The Simpsons	Herself (voice)	Episode: "Missionary: Impossible"	
2001	The Ellen Show	Connie Gibson	Episode: "Missing the Bus"	
2002	Teacher's Pet	Granny (voice)	Episode: "The Turkey That Came for Dinner"	
2002	Yes, Dear	Sylvia	Episode: "Kim's New Nanny"	
2002	Providence	Julianna	Episode: "The Heart of the Matter"	
2002–03	That '70s Show	Bea Sigurdson	Recurring role, 4 episodes	
2003	The Grim Adventures of Billy & Mandy	Mrs. Doolin (voice)	Episode: "Who Killed Who?"	
2003	Gary the Rat	Gary's Mother (voice)	Episode: "This Is Not a Pipe"	
2003	I'm with Her	Herself	Episode: "Meet the Parent"	
2003	Stealing Christmas	Emily Sutton	TV film	
2003–04	Everwood	Carol Roberts	2 episodes	
2004	The Practice	Catherine Piper	3 episodes	
2004	My Wife and Kids	Mrs. June Hopkins	Episode: "The Maid	
2004	Malcolm in the Middle	Sylvia	Episode: "Victor's Other Family"	
2004	Father of the Pride	Grandma Wilson	Episode 8: "Donkey"	
2004–05	Complete Savages	Mrs. Riley	2 episodes	
2005	Joey	Margaret Bly	Episode: "Joey and the House"	
2005	Annie's Point	Annie Eason	TV film	
2005–08	Boston Legal	Catherine Piper	Recurring role, 16 episodes	
2006	My Name Is Earl	Mrs. May Rose Weezmer	Episode: "The Witch Lady"	
2006	Family Guy	Herself (voice)	Episode: "Peterotica"	
2006	Game Show Marathon	Herself (Panelist)	Episode: "Match Game"	
2006–09	The Bold and the Beautiful	Ann Douglas	Recurring role, 23 episodes	
2007	Higglytown Heroes	Grandmama (voice)	Episode: Calling All Heroes	
2007	Ugly Betty	Herself	Episode: "Bananas for Betty"	
2007	The Simpsons	Herself (voice)	Episode: "Homerazzi"	
2009	30 Rock	Herself	Episode: "Stone Mountain"	
2009	Kathy Griffin: My Life on the D-List	Herself	Episode: "Maggie's Bucket List"	
2009–10	Glenn Martin DDS	Grandma Shelia Martin (voice)	Guest role, 2 episodes	
2010	The Middle	Mrs. Nethercott	Episode: "Average Rules"	
2010	Community	Professor June Bauer	Episodes: "Anthropology 101" & "The Psychology of Letting Go"	
2010, 2015	Saturday Night Live	Host, Various roles	Episodes: "Betty White/Jay-Z", "Saturday Night Live 40th Anniversary Special"	
2010–15	Hot in Cleveland	Elka Ostrovsky	Main role, 128 episodes	
2010–13	Pound Puppies	Agatha McLeish (voice)	Main role, 13 episodes	
2011	The Lost Valentine	Caroline Thomas	TV film	
2012–17	Betty White's Off Their Rockers	Herself	Host	
2012	The Client List	Ruth Hudson	Episode: "Past Is Prologue"	
2013	Save Me	God	Episode: "Holier Than Thou"	
2013	Mickey Mouse	Old Lady (voice)	Episode: "New York Weenie"	
2014	The Soul Man	Elka Ostrovsky	Episode: "All the Way Live"	
2015–18	Fireside Chat with Esther	Rose / Lady Bette	3 episodes	
2015–17	Bones	Dr. Beth Mayer	2 episodes	
2015	Betty White's Smartest Animals in America	Herself	Host	
2016	SpongeBob SquarePants	Beatrice (voice)	Episode: "Mall Girl Pearl"	
2016	Crowded	Sandy	Episode: "The Fixer"	
2017	Young & Hungry	Ms. Bernice Wilson	2 episodes	
2017	If You're Not in the Obit, Eat Breakfast	Herself	TV film	
2018	Betty White: First Lady of Television	Herself	Documentary	
2019	Forky Asks a Question	Bitey White (voice)	Episode: "What Is Love?"	

== See also ==
- List of awards and nominations received by Betty White
