= Darnell Martin =

American screenwriter

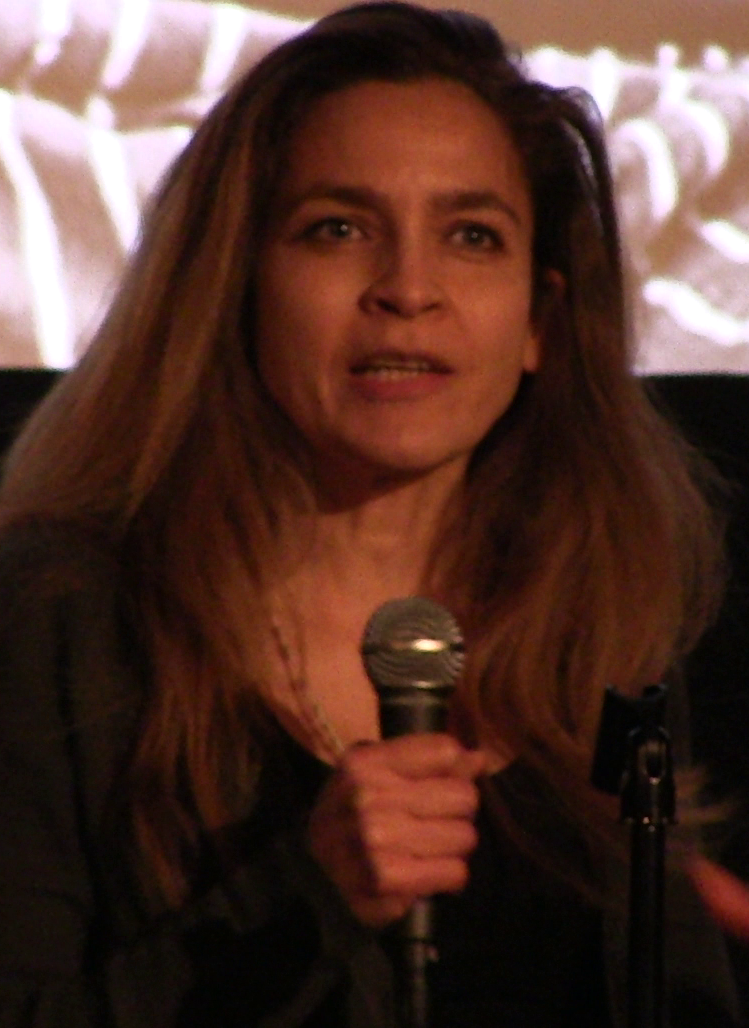
- Born: Darnell Martin; January 7, 1964 (age 62); New York City, New York, U.S.
- Education: Sarah Lawrence College (Bachelor of Arts); New York University (Master of Fine Arts)
- Occupations: Director, screenwriter
- Years active: 1989–present

Darnell Martin (born January 7, 1964) is an American television and film director, screenwriter, and film producer.

== Early life and education ==
Martin was born in Bronx, New York, the daughter of Marilyn, a dancer of Irish-American descent, and an African-American attorney. From the Bronx, she went to Sarah Lawrence College and New York University Film School. Along the way, she worked in film labs and camera rental houses and as a bartender, made music videos and short films, and wrote the first draft of I Like It Like That.

== Career ==
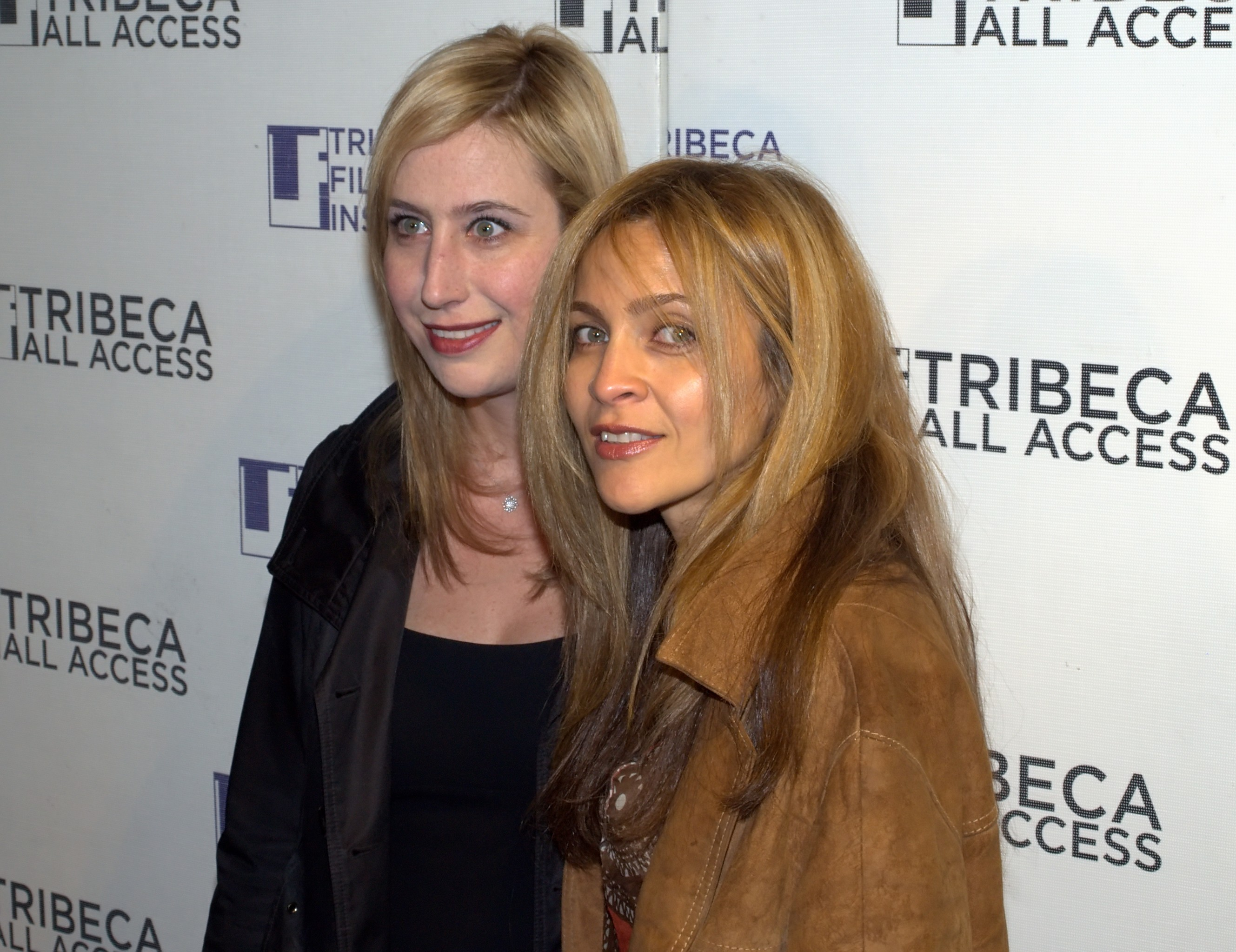
Sofia Sondervan and Martin at the 2010 Tribeca Film Festival

In 1992, Martin's first short film, Suspect, which examined the treatment of young black people as assumed criminals, won critical acclaim at the New York Public Theater's Young Black Cinema showcase. After directing Suspect, Martin served as assistant camera operator for Jonathan Demme's documentary Cousin Bobby, about his cousin Robert Castle, an Episcopal pastor who works in Harlem. The film was well-received from the majority of critics.

In 1994, Martin directed the Columbia Pictures release I Like It Like That, a comedy-drama about a young woman who is trying to love her man, keep her family together, assert her self-worth, and keep her sanity. The film was well-received by critics, but it did not perform well at the box office. In 2001, Martin directed Prison Song.

In 2011, Martin directed The Lost Valentine, a Hallmark Hall of Fame television movie starring Jennifer Love Hewitt, Betty White and Sean Faris. It is based on the novel by James Michael Pratt of the same name, previously titled The Last Valentine. In December 2011, Betty White received a nomination for the Screen Actors Guild Award for Outstanding Performance by a Female Actor in a Miniseries or Television Movie for her performance. The film was a huge success, winning its time period in viewers (14.53 million, beating out Fox's second hour of coverage of the NFL Pro Bowl and becoming the most-watched Hallmark movie in four years.[6] The film won the Faith & Freedom Award for Television at the 2012 Movieguide Awards.

Martin has since directed episodes of TV shows such as Law & Order, Grey's Anatomy and The Walking Dead. In 2008, Martin wrote and directed Cadillac Records, a musical-drama film based on the work of Leonard Chess and the singers who recorded for Chess Records through the early days of R&B and rock 'n' roll. In 2012, she directed the television film Firelight. In 2016, she directed The Walking Dead episode "Go Getters" during season 7. In 2020, she directed an episode on The Good Lord Bird. Also in 2020, she directed an episode of Netflix’s series Grand Army. In 2021, she directed an episode of New Amsterdam.
