= James Pratt =

James Pratt may refer to:

- James Pratt (groom) (1805–1835), London man; one of the last two to be hanged for sodomy in England
- James T. Pratt (1802–1887), American politician
- James Bissett Pratt (1875–1944), philosopher
- James Norwood Pratt (born 1942), author and authority on wine and tea
- James Michael Pratt (born 1953), American writer and documentary filmmaker
