= List of awards and nominations received by Betty White =

Betty White awards and nominations
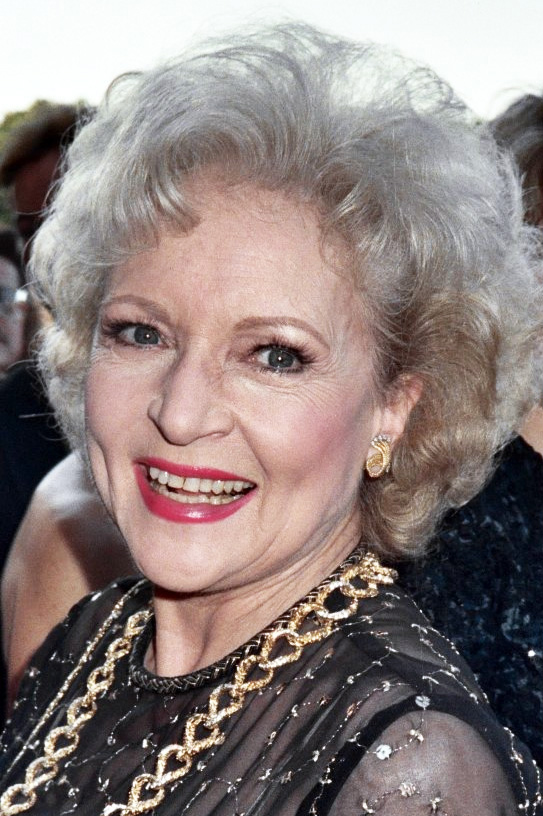
- White at the 1989 Emmy Awards
Awards and nominations
Award	Wins	Nominations
Emmy Awards	7	24
Golden Globe Awards	0	4
Screen Actors Guild Awards	2	5
Grammy Awards	1	1

Totals (Note: Certain award groups do not simply award one winner. They acknowledge several different recipients, have runners-up, and have third place. Since this is a specific recognition and is different from losing an award, runner-up mentions are considered wins in this award tally. For simplification and to avoid errors, each award in this list has been presumed to have had a prior nomination.)
- Wins: 27
- Nominations: 57

Betty White (1922–2021) was an American actress whose career spanned almost seven decades. Her major competitive awards include seven Emmy Awards, a Grammy Award, and two Screen Actors Guild Awards as well as nominations for four Golden Globe Awards. She also was honored with the Screen Actors Guild Life Achievement Award and the Britannia Award, both in 2010, and the Daytime Emmy Lifetime Achievement Award in 2015.

== Major associations ==
=== BAFTA Awards ===
Year	Category	Nominated work	Result
BAFTA Los Angeles Britannia Awards
2010	Charlie Chaplin Britannia Award for Excellence in Comedy	—N/a	Honored

=== Golden Globe Awards ===
Year	Category	Nominated work	Result
Golden Globe Awards
1986	Best Actress – Television Series Musical or Comedy	The Golden Girls	Nominated
1987	Best Actress – Television Series Musical or Comedy	The Golden Girls	Nominated
1988	Best Actress – Television Series Musical or Comedy	The Golden Girls	Nominated
1989	Best Actress – Television Series Musical or Comedy	The Golden Girls	Nominated

=== Emmy Awards ===
Year	Category	Nominated work	Result
Primetime Emmy Awards
1951	Best Actress	—N/a	Nominated
1975	Outstanding Continuing Performance by a Supporting Actress in a Comedy Series	The Mary Tyler Moore Show	Won
1976	Outstanding Continuing Performance by a Supporting Actress in a Comedy Series	The Mary Tyler Moore Show	Won
1977	Outstanding Continuing Performance by a Supporting Actress in a Comedy Series	The Mary Tyler Moore Show	Nominated
1986	Outstanding Lead Actress in a Comedy Series	The Golden Girls (for episode "In a Bed of Rose's")	Won
1987	Outstanding Lead Actress in a Comedy Series	The Golden Girls (for episode "Isn't It Romantic?")	Nominated
1988	Outstanding Lead Actress in a Comedy Series	The Golden Girls (for episode "Bringing Up Baby")	Nominated
1989	Outstanding Lead Actress in a Comedy Series	The Golden Girls (for episode "High Anxiety")	Nominated
1990	Outstanding Lead Actress in a Comedy Series	The Golden Girls (for episode "Rose Fights Back")	Nominated
1991	Outstanding Lead Actress in a Comedy Series	The Golden Girls (for episode "Once, in St. Olaf")	Nominated
1992	Outstanding Lead Actress in a Comedy Series	The Golden Girls (for episode "Dateline: Miami")	Nominated
1996	Outstanding Guest Actress in a Comedy Series	The John Larroquette Show	Won
1997	Outstanding Guest Actress in a Comedy Series	Suddenly Susan	Nominated
2003	Outstanding Guest Actress in a Comedy Series	Yes, Dear	Nominated
2004	Outstanding Guest Actress in a Drama Series	The Practice	Nominated
2009	Outstanding Guest Actress in a Comedy Series	My Name Is Earl	Nominated
2010	Outstanding Guest Actress in a Comedy Series	Saturday Night Live (for episode "Host: Betty White")	Won
2011	Outstanding Supporting Actress in a Comedy Series	Hot in Cleveland (for episode "Free Elka")	Nominated
2012	Outstanding Host for a Reality or Reality Competition Program	Betty White's Off Their Rockers	Nominated
2013	Outstanding Host for a Reality or Reality Competition Program	Betty White's Off Their Rockers	Nominated
2014	Outstanding Host for a Reality or Reality Competition Program	Betty White's Off Their Rockers	Nominated
Daytime Emmy Awards
1983	Outstanding Game Show Host	Just Men!	Won
1984	Outstanding Game Show Host	Just Men!	Nominated
2015	Lifetime Achievement Award	—N/a	Honored
Los Angeles Emmy Awards
1952	Outstanding Personality	Life with Elizabeth	Won

=== Grammy Awards ===
Year	Category	Nominated work	Result
Grammy Awards
2012	Best Spoken Word Recording	If You Ask Me (And of Course You Won't)	Won

=== Screen Actors Guild Awards ===
Year	Category	Nominated work	Result
Screen Actors Guild Awards
2010	Life Achievement Award	—N/a	Honored
2011	Outstanding Performance by an Ensemble in a Comedy Series	Hot in Cleveland	Nominated
2011	Outstanding Performance by a Female Actor in a Comedy Series	Hot in Cleveland	Won
2012	Outstanding Performance by a Female Actor in a Comedy Series	Hot in Cleveland	Won
2012	Outstanding Performance by a Female Actor in a Miniseries or Television Movie	The Lost Valentine	Nominated
2013	Outstanding Performance by a Female Actor in a Comedy Series	Hot in Cleveland	Nominated

== Miscellaneous awards ==
=== American Comedy Awards ===
No.	Year	Category	Title	Result	Ref.
1	1987	Funniest Female Performer in a TV Series (Leading Role) Network, Cable or Syndication	The Golden Girls	Won	
2	1990	Funniest Female Performer in a TV Series (Leading Role) Network, Cable or Syndication	The Golden Girls	Nominated	
3	1990	Lifetime Achievement Award in Comedy		Won	
4	2000	Funniest Female Guest Appearance in a TV Series	Ally McBeal	Won	

=== The Comedy Awards ===
No.	Year	Category	Title	Result	Ref.
1	2011	Best Actress in a TV Comedy	Hot in Cleveland	Won	

=== Disney Legends Awards ===
No.	Year	Category	Result	Ref.
1	2009	Disney Legend	Won	

=== Gracie Allen Awards ===
No.	Year	Category	Title	Result	Ref.
1	2011	Best Actress in a Comedy Series	Hot in Cleveland	Won	

=== Golden Apple Award ===
No.	Year	Category	Result	Ref.
1	1986	Female Star of the Year	Won	

=== MTV Movie Awards ===
No.	Year	Category	Title	Result	Ref.
1	2010	Best WTF Moment	The Proposal	Nominated	
2	2010	Best Comedic Performance	The Proposal	Nominated	

=== NewNowNext Awards ===
No.	Year	Category	Result	Ref.
1	2010	Cause You're Hot	Nominated	

=== People's Choice Awards ===
No.	Year	Category	Title	Result	Ref.
1	2011	Favorite TV Guest Star	Community	Nominated	
2	2011	Favorite Web Celeb		Nominated	
3	2015	TV Icon		Won	

=== Slammy Award ===
No.	Year	Category	Title	Result	Ref.
1	2014	Raw Guest Star of the Year	WWE Raw	Nominated	

=== Teen Choice Award ===
No.	Year	Category	Title	Result	Ref.
1	2010	Best Dance (with Sandra Bullock)	The Proposal	Won	

=== TV Land Award ===
No.	Year	Category	Title	Result	Ref.
1	2003	Quintessential Non-Traditional Family	The Golden Girls	Won	
2	2004	Groundbreaking Show	The Mary Tyler Moore Show	Won	
3	2008	Pop Culture Award	The Golden Girls	Won	
4	2015	Legend Award		Won	

=== UCLA Jack Benny Award ===
No.	Year	Category	Result	Ref.
1	2011	Comedian	Won	

=== Viewers for Quality Television "Q" Awards ===
No.	Year	Category	Title	Result	Ref.
1	1987	Best Actress in a Quality Comedy Series	The Golden Girls	Won	
2	1988	Best Actress in a Quality Comedy Series	The Golden Girls	Won	

=== Women Film Critics Circle Awards ===
No.	Year	Category	Result	Ref.
1	2021	Lifetime Achievement	Won	

== Other honors ==
=== Hollywood Walk of Fame ===
No.	Year	Category	Result	Ref.
1	1995	Star on the Walk of Fame	Won	

- Illinois General Assembly*

After her death, the legislative body in her home state of Illinois passed a resolution on January 17, 2022, declaring January 17th to be Betty White Day.
