= Betty White's Smartest Animals in America =

Betty White's Smartest Animals in America is an American television series launched in 2015, that broadcasts on Great American Country. The series was hosted by Betty White.

== Production ==
The series premiered on Betty White's 93rd birthday.

== Premise ==
Ninety-three-year-old entertainer and animal activist Betty White travels America showcasing intelligent animals. The series premiered on January 17, 2015, on cable network Great American Country.
