= Hollywood on Television =

American TV talk show (1949–1953)

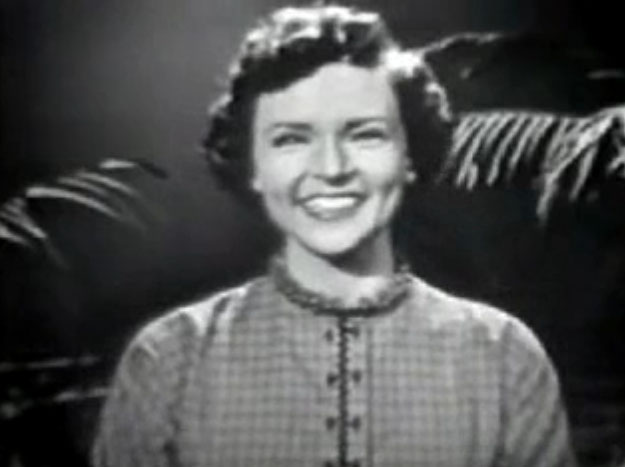
Betty White in 1954

Hollywood on Television is a five-hour, six-day-a-week live television talk show that starred newcomer Betty White and radio disc jockey Al Jarvis that ran from 1949-1953. Broadcast from 12:30 to 5:30 p.m. Pacific Time, it was the first daytime program on KLAC-TV in Los Angeles.

When Jarvis left the show in 1951, film star Eddie Albert took his place and co-hosted with White for six months until thirty-three and a half hours of live ad-lib television per week, featuring just the two of them, took its toll and he also resigned. White was then hosting the show alone and is believed to have been the first female television talk show host as a result. After a period of White talking directly into the camera lens for hours at a stretch, the show began accepting guests to interact with her as well as gradually incorporating scripts and sketches.

Similar to Jackie Gleason's Honeymooners sketches on the Dumont Network during the same era, recurring sketches involving White as a housewife named Elizabeth caught on with the viewers to the point that expanding the sketches into a half-hour sitcom appeared to be the obvious next step. Series pianist George Tibbles began writing the sketches. Studio producer Don Fedderson, Tibbles and White formed a production company called "Bandy Productions," named after Betty White's dog Bandit, and White changed over to a half hour sitcom format based on the Elizabeth sketches entitled Life With Elizabeth, which ran in syndication for two years and sixty-five episodes.

In 1952, White began a parallel program called The Betty White Show. This show used a similar format and had much of the same cast members. The Betty White Show saw a national audience with NBC in 1954 before being cancelled that same year.

Across the decades, White would use the skills she had honed on Hollywood on Television by hosting her own talk show in 1954 and subsequent variety series as well as starring in numerous sitcoms, including Date with the Angels, The Mary Tyler Moore Show, The Golden Girls, The Golden Palace and Hot in Cleveland, as well as hosting the 2012 prank show Betty White's Off Their Rockers, which began airing 63 years after the premiere of Hollywood on Television.
