= Morris Animal Foundation =

U.S. non-profit organization

Morris Animal Foundation is an animal health charity based in Colorado, United States. The Foundation advances veterinary medicine and funds veterinary research for companion animals, horses and wildlife.

== History ==
It was started, in 1948, by Mark L. Morris Sr., a veterinarian, who had been consulted about a dog with kidney failure. Morris helped the dog by devising a special diet. After he commercialized the diet, he used the profits to start the foundation.

== Funding ==
Morris Animal Foundation advances animal health by funding scientific studies at accredited research institutions, colleges of veterinary medicine and zoos. Since its inception, the Foundation has invested more than $118 million toward more than 2,600 studies to improve the health and quality of life for dogs, cats, horses and wildlife around the world. These studies have led to better prevention, diagnostic tools, treatment protocols and even cures for animal diseases and other health challenges.

They also provide critical funding to aspiring researchers in animal health fields, including support for two- and four-year training programs for post-doctoral students and a Scholars Program which allows veterinary students to do research early in their careers. The foundation has awarded over 400 grants to various veterinary students, at over 40 different schools in eight countries.
