= George Tibbles =

American screenwriter (1913–1987)

George F. Tibbles
- Born: June 7, 1913
- Died: February 14, 1987 (aged 73)
- Occupations: Composer; screenwriter
- Notable work: "Woody Woodpecker Song"

George F. Tibbles (June 7, 1913 – February 14, 1987) was an American composer and screenwriter.

He and Ramez Idriss co-wrote "The Woody Woodpecker Song" for the 1948 short film, Wet Blanket Policy; the song would receive an Academy Award nomination (Academy Award for Best Original Song), and by June 30, 1948, it was third on the hit parade. Tibbles also composed the theme music for Bringing Up Buddy and Pistols 'n' Petticoats.

Tibbles wrote the scripts for the TV series My Three Sons, as well as several for the shows Leave It to Beaver, One Day at a Time, The Betty White Show, and Life with Elizabeth.

Tibbles authored the stage comedy That's All the Love I've Got..., which played at the Charles Playhouse in Boston from July 17-26, 1981. The production starred Kaye Ballard and Marisa Pavan and was directed by Sheldon Keller.

== Awards nominations ==
Year(s)	Award	Category	Title of work	Result
1949	21st Academy Awards	Best Original Song	"The Woody Woodpecker Song"	Nominated
