= Betty White: A Celebration =

American biographical documentary

- Theatrical release poster
- Directed by: Steve Boettchner
- Written by: Jon Macks
- Produced by: Steve Boettcher; Mike Trinklein
- Starring: Betty White; Valerie Bertinelli; Carol Burnett; Clint Eastwood; Tina Fey; Morgan Freeman; Jennifer Love Hewitt; Wendie Malick; Lin-Manuel Miranda; Robert Redford; Ryan Reynolds
- Release date: January 17, 2022
- Running time: 100 minutes
- Country: United States
- Language: English

Betty White: A Celebration, originally titled Betty White: 100 Years Young – A Birthday Celebration, is an American documentary film about the actress Betty White. It was released in theaters on what would have been her 100th birthday, January 17, 2022. White died on December 31, 2021, from complications following a stroke, two and a half weeks prior to the film's release, thus making this her final film role.

== Production ==
In December 2021, it was announced that White's 100th birthday would be celebrated with a new documentary-style movie about her life and career. The title was revealed as Betty White: 100 Years Young – A Birthday Celebration in the same announcement.

The announced cast includes many of White's friends: Ryan Reynolds, Tina Fey, Robert Redford, Lin-Manuel Miranda, Clint Eastwood, Morgan Freeman, Jay Leno, Carol Burnett, Craig Ferguson, Jimmy Kimmel, Valerie Bertinelli, James Corden, Wendie Malick, and Jennifer Love Hewitt. The film was reformatted after White's death, focusing more greatly on the final interview she gave for it, said by the production company to give "a backstage look at her career, and insights into what was most important to her."

== Release and marketing ==
The release plan was announced at the same time as the film, set to be shown in theatres across the United States on January 17, 2022, marking White's centenary. The film would be released on the scheduled date.

People magazine featured White as the cover story of their January 2022 newsstand publication, anticipating the milestone. This magazine was published on December 29, 2021, two days before White's death. In an interview with People featured in the magazine, White commented that she was "so lucky to be in such good health and feel so good at this age. It's amazing."

Following White's death from complications from a stroke on December 31, 2021, less than three weeks before her 100th birthday and before the film's release, producers Steve Boettcher and Mike Trinklein of the event distributors Fathom Events announced in a Facebook post that the pre-filmed production would be going on as scheduled:

Our hearts mourn today with the passing of Betty White. During the many years we worked with her, we developed a great love and admiration for Betty as a person, and as an accomplished entertainer. We are thankful for the many decades of delight she brought to everyone. Betty always said she was the "luckiest broad on two feet” to have had a career as long as she did. And honestly, we were the lucky ones to have had her for so long. We will go forward with our plans to show the film on January 17 in hopes our film will provide a way for all who loved her to celebrate her life—and experience what made her such a national treasure.

On January 3, 2022, it was confirmed that the film was still to be released as planned on January 17, 2022. The announcement also gave the updated name of the film as Betty White: A Celebration. Upon its release, Betty White: A Celebration was screened in 900 theaters all across the US.
