= The Lost Valentine =

2011 television film directed by Darnell Martin

- Promotional poster
- Genre: Romance
- Based on: The Lost Valentine by James Michael Pratt
- Screenplay by: Maryann Ridini Spencer; Barton Taney
- Directed by: Darnell Martin
- Starring: Jennifer Love Hewitt; Betty White; Sean Faris
- Theme music composer: Mark Adler
- Country of origin: United States
- Original language: English

Production
- Producers: Barbara Gangi; Andrew Gottlieb; Nicole C. Taylor
- Cinematography: Frank Prinzi
- Editor: Michael D. Ornstein
- Running time: 100 minutes
- Production company: Hallmark Hall of Fame

Original release
- Network: CBS
- Release: January 30, 2011

Related
- November Christmas; Beyond the Blackboard

The Lost Valentine is a 2011 drama film in the Hallmark Hall of Fame anthology series starring Jennifer Love Hewitt, Betty White and Sean Faris. It is based on the novel by James Michael Pratt of the same name, previously titled The Last Valentine, a 1998 New York Times and USA Today bestseller. In December 2011, Betty White received a nomination for the Screen Actors Guild Award for Outstanding Performance by a Female Actor in a Miniseries or Television Movie for her performance.

== Plot ==
A TV journalist, Susan Allison, is working on a profile of a woman, Caroline Thomas, whose husband, naval aviator Lt. Neil Thomas, was declared MIA 60 years ago during World War II. Susan immediately clashes with Caroline's grandson, Lucas Thomas, when he overhears her referring to the potential story as a fluff piece, rather than the very personal story it is, since she herself doubts if pure and true love exists. She apologizes, and manages to start the interview and starts spending time with both Caroline and Lucas. Her developing friendship with Lucas makes her have doubts about her relationship with her almost fiance, Andrew Hawthorne, a photographer who is frequently absent overseas.

The interview with Caroline reveals that for 66 years she has had no information about her husband from the Department of the Navy. She tells her story about how she and her husband met in 1943, married, and then renovated a house they had bought from her uncle (which is where Caroline still lives). After a year, and despite a child forthcoming, Neil felt he should help his country more than just acting as a training officer, so he went into combat. Their last moments together were at the Union train station, where she handed him a handmade valentine professing her everlasting love, as he departed on a train. Caroline remained strong, and sent many letters to Neil. On one occasion, Neil replied with a letter containing a small, handmade whittled wooden sculpture of a fighter plane for the baby. After that Caroline stopped receiving letters. Caroline, along with the entire neighborhood, dreaded the times when a Western Union deliveryman arrived in the neighborhood with a yellow telegram, since this meant that someone's loved one was reported to be dead or missing in action. Eventually, the moment where Caroline received one came, but the telegram stated that her husband was missing in action, so she refused to believe that he was dead. Since then Caroline has returned every year on Valentine's Day to the same train station to wait for him.

With the help of a United States Senator (Susan did an unrelated story on him) who puts pressure on the Navy, they locate the Billings family, whose now deceased father Jeff was a gunner on Lt. Thomas' airplane. From a surviving letter by Jeff to his wife we hear the account of the crash and of Morang, a Filipino guerilla, who rescued two wounded crash survivors. Susan turns to Andrew for help because he still has connections to the Philippines where Lt. Thomas was last seen alive.

Putting past hard feelings over his breakup with Susan aside, Andrew manages to locate the elderly Morang whilst in the Philippines and sets up a video conference between him and Caroline. The story of the fate of Lt. Thomas, Morang says, is that he was badly wounded, but insisted his more seriously injured gunner, Jeff Billings, be evacuated first. When Lt. Thomas had recovered, he joined the Filipino guerillas and fought the Japanese deep behind enemy lines. During a patrol, Lt. Thomas was killed by a Japanese sniper while selflessly trying to rescue a little boy. Morang reveals he knows where Lt. Thomas' body is buried.

The U.S. Navy goes to the grave site and returns Lt. Thomas' remains and personal effects to the United States. Caroline is handed Neil's dog-tags, watch, and wallet, which contains her valentine to him, now faded, which he always carried close to his heart. In recognition of Lt. Thomas's bravery, courage, and meritorious service, he is to be posthumously awarded the Navy Cross, Silver Star and Purple Heart. On Valentine's Day, Lt. Thomas' coffin is returned to Caroline at Union Station by the U.S. Navy with full military honors, conducted in front of well-wishers and TV cameras, with a tearful Caroline taking her last goodbyes from her beloved Neil to the sound of Taps. Caroline is cheered when Lucas and Susan begin a romantic relationship. The film ends with Caroline, who has found peace and closure, seeing that the rosebush Neil had planted long ago in their garden has a new single bloom, the first in a long time, signaling long-lasting love, as she remembers her romantic moments with Neil in the same garden, to the sound of "Dream a Little Dream of Me" playing on the radio.

== Cast ==
- Jennifer Love Hewitt as Susan Allison
- Betty White as Caroline Robinson Thomas
  - Meghann Fahy as young Caroline Robinson Thomas
- Sean Faris as Lucas Thomas
- Billy Magnussen as Neil Thomas
- Gil Gerard as Neil Thomas Jr.
- Will Chase as Andrew Hawthorne
- Nadia Dajani as Julie Oliver
- Robert Pralgo as David Oliver
- Gregory Alan Williams as Navy Chaplain Richard Brady
- Victoria Loving as Maggie Thomas, Lucas's mother
- Helmar Augustus Cooper as Joseph Williams

== Production ==
The teleplay was written by Maryann Ridini Spencer and Barton Taney. Spencer met the author of the book, James Michael Pratt, in 2001 and fell in love with the storyline. Her screenplay, based on the novel, ultimately resulted in a contract with Hallmark. Spencer is also co-producer of the project.

== Home media ==
The film aired on January 30, 2011, on CBS and was available to order from Hallmark after the film aired.

== Reception ==
The Lost Valentine earned mostly positive reviews, with White's performance receiving high praise and great acclaim. The film received a generally positive review from US Weekly, who said it was "Supercorny, though White tugs the heart". Brian Lowry of Variety stated that "Betty White is easily the best reason to watch The Lost Valentine." Matthew Gilbert of The Boston Globe said of White's performance that "She’s a funny lady for sure, but she can also nicely manage gravitas and vulnerability." Jackie Cooper from HuffPost said of White "This movie allows audiences to see her dramatic side and if her grieving widow can’t break your heart, nothing can." And Jim Heinrich of the Pittsburgh Post-Gazette described White's performance as "Excellent."

The film was a huge success which not only won its time period in viewers (14.53 million, beating out Fox's second hour of coverage of the NFL Pro Bowl) but represented the most-watched Hallmark movie in four years (since the film Valley of Light aired in January 2007). The film won the Faith & Freedom Award for Television at the 2012 Movieguide Awards.
