= The Betty White Show (1952 TV series) =

American actress Betty White's 1952 television series

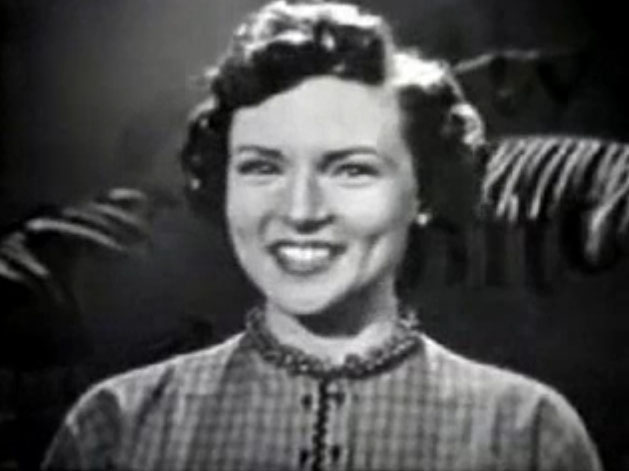
- Betty White in The Betty White Show in 1954
- Genre: Talk show
- Country of origin: United States
- No. of seasons: 3

Production
- Production location: Los Angeles, California

Original release
- Network: KLAC-TV (1952–1953); NBC (1954)
- Release: January 1, 1952 – December 31, 1954

Related
- Betty White Show (1958 TV series)

The Betty White Show is a television series that aired on KLAC-TV in 1952 and 1953, and on NBC in 1954. The show was a daytime talk show that also featured entertainment segments that are typical of variety shows. Betty White served as both host and producer.

== Background ==
Betty White began as a cast member of the TV talk show Hollywood on Television in 1949, which was hosted by Al Jarvis and Eddie Albert. The Eddie Albert Show was created as a spinoff of this show, and it premiered on KTLA in January 1952. However, as Albert was in demand as a Hollywood actor, he left the show later that year to film Roman Holiday. With his departure, the show was renamed for Betty White, who became the host and producer of the show. The show continued to air on KLAC-TV until the end of that year.

In 1953, NBC had a weak television lineup, and executives began a search for new content. Hearing of White's popularity, executives flew to LA to audition her. Impressed with her performance, they agreed to air her show on NBC. The show's national premiere was on February 8, 1954. Each episode of the Betty White show featured White singing. She also interviewed guests, performed in skits, and each episode had a children's segment. The show had positive reviews, with Billboard describing White as "attractive, charming and talented", and TV Guide said she had "...the disposition of a storybook heroine."

== Opposition to racial segregation ==
One of White's regular performers was the African American tap dancer Arthur Duncan; whose appearances marked the first time a black person was a series regular on a US talk show. His appearances were the big break that launched his career. However, as the show was syndicated nationally, television stations in the Southern United States threatened a boycott if Duncan remained on the show because his performances conflicted with the racial segregation policies of the Jim Crow laws. White refused to fire him, saying "I'm sorry, but, you know, he stays. Live with it." Duncan was unaware of the controversy until years later. In addition to the issue about Duncan, the show struggled to attract sponsors.

== Cancellation ==
Despite good reviews, the ratings for The Betty White Show were lackluster. Throughout 1954, the show's time slot was repeatedly changed. NBC quietly canceled the program on December 31, 1954.
