= Life with Elizabeth =

American television sitcom (1953–1955)

- Genre: Sitcom
- Created by: George Tibbles; Betty White; Don Fedderson
- Written by: Milt Kahn; George Tibbles
- Directed by: Duke Goldstone
- Starring: Betty White; Del Moore
- Narrated by: Jack Narz
- Country of origin: United States
- Original language: English
- No. of seasons: 2
- No. of episodes: 65

Production
- Producers: Betty White; Don Fedderson; Cal Reed; George Tibbles
- Cinematography: Mack Stengler
- Editor: Robert Oberbeck
- Running time: 24–25 minutes
- Production companies: Bandy Productions; Don Fedderson

Original release
- Network: Syndication
- Release: October 7, 1953 – September 1, 1955

Life with Elizabeth is an American television sitcom starring Betty White as Elizabeth and Del Moore as her husband Alvin; Jack Narz is the on-camera announcer and narrator. The series aired in syndication from October 7, 1953, to September 1, 1955. The show was the first of many sitcoms for Betty White across the decades and was based on sketches involving the Elizabeth character that she had performed on her earlier talk show Hollywood on Television.

The low-budget comedy was produced by and filmed at Los Angeles TV station KLAC-TV (now KCOP-TV) where White and Moore were on the staff (the series was originally a live production on KLAC-TV in 1951). White received her first Primetime Emmy Award nomination for her work on this series.

== Premise ==
Elizabeth and Alvin are an ordinary suburban couple, but inevitably get into predicaments. In the end, Alvin, in variable degrees of frustration, would say, "I shall leave you at this point, Elizabeth," and would walk out of sight. The announcer would ask, "Elizabeth, aren't you ashamed?" She would slowly nod, but then, with a slightly devilish grin, would vigorously shake her head to indicate she was not.

The series was divided into three eight- to ten-minute comic shorts — referred to as "incidents". Sometimes an entire incident might just consist of the two main characters talking to each other. The minimal theme music was played by a solo harpist who was partially visible on the opening title screen.

== Production ==
The series was created by George Tibbles who also served as a writer. The series was produced by Bandy Productions, a production company formed by Betty White and George Tibbles, in association with executive producer Don Fedderson.

Nina Bara appeared in several episodes.

=== Cancellation ===
After 65 episodes, the series' production company, Guild Films, chose to cancel the series. While the series was still popular with audiences, Guild Films decided that too many new episodes of Life with Elizabeth would oversaturate secondary markets, thus making the series less profitable in second-run syndication.

== Episodes ==
1	Moosie in the Kitchen; Jungle in the Living Room; Underhills for Dinner
2	Balance Check Book; Late for a Party; Piano Tuner
3	Bad Mood; First Kiss; Ex-Flame
4	Ping Pong; Leaking Roof; Vacuum Cleaner Salesman
5	The Psychic; Car Repair for Dummies; Bird Bath
6 Sixth episode of Life with Elizabeth	Oak Tree; TV Repair; Drive-In
7	Mam's Letter; Lodge Dinner; Richard Gets Fired
8	Nursery Rhymes; First Business Trip; Lake Allergies
9	Learning to Drive; Day They Moved In; Alvin Asks Boss Home
10	Car is Stolen; Fence Needs Painting; Real Estate Deal
11	Bonus Check; House Cleaning; Richard's Moustache
12	Black Eye; Momma for Breakfast; Missing Receptionist
13	Article On Carpentry; Hypnotism; Home Movies
14	Mam's Visit; Bicycle Picnic; Nosey Neighborhood
15	Photographer; Of the Honeymoon; Numb, Deaf and Blind
16	Phone Calls to Work; Girl Scout Trip; Census Taker
17	Collection Agency; Monster With Green Eyes; Good Neighbor Policy
18	Detective Stories; Writing a Speech; Moosie on the Patio
19	Scared Silly; Neighborhood Slingshot; Elmer's Garage
20	Everything Goes Wrong; Tenderhearted With Animals; Babysitting Eddie Miller

== Broadcast and syndication ==
The series was exported to Australia during the late 1950s. Life with Elizabeth aired in syndication on America One, on the HOT (History of Television) Network in New York (WKOB 42.4) & Dallas (K31GL 31.3), and on Lost TV and The Decades Binge on the Decades Network.

On September 11, 1998, Betty White, Jack Narz and Peter Michael Goetz as Alvin participated in a restaging of Life with Elizabeth for 13 at 50, a two-hour retrospective of KCOP-TV's 50th anniversary co-hosted by news anchors Tawny Little and Alan Frio. The segment was filmed in front of a live studio audience, with Betty White playing her original role.

== Home media ==
Because the show was formatted as separate eight-minute sketches, a number of used 16mm prints of the films were cut into individual segments and sold on the "home movies" market by the Superior Bulk Film Co. of Chicago, a mail-order movie equipment dealer, in the late 1960s and 1970s. Since the series entered the public domain, it has been released in volumes of budget DVD releases.
