= James Michael Pratt =

American writer and film producer

- Born: James Michael Pratt; 1953 (age 72–73); Los Angeles, California, U.S.
- Occupation: Novelist,
- Writing career
- Genre: Romantic fiction

James Michael Pratt (born 1953) is an American writer. His novel The Lost Valentine (originally published as The Last Valentine) was adapted into a film released by Hallmark Hall of Fame in 2011. He has been called a Master of moral fictionby Booklist for his realistic depictions of love. Pratt has 7 other titles listed at his website including The Lost Valentine. A native of Simi Valley, California, Pratt is married and the father of two adult children. He credits growing up in California for many of the influences found in his stories. He has three additional books being adapted to film including a new title, yet to be released, When the Last Leaf Falls.

== Published works ==
- Ticket Home
- The Lighthouse Keeper
- The Last Valentine 1998 and released in 2011 as The Lost Valentine
- The Good Heart
- The Christ Report
- Paradise Bay
- MOM, The Woman Who Made Oatmeal Stick to My Ribs
- DAD, The Man Who Lied to Save the Planet
- As A Man Thinketh, In His Heart

== Film adaption ==
- The Lost Valentine was viewed by over 14.3 million households as a CBS Movie of the Week and Hallmark Hall of Fame on January 30, 2011. It was based upon the novel, The Last Valentine by James Michael Pratt first published in 1998 by St. Martin's Press.
