= Charles A. Callis =

American religious leader and politician

- Callis as president of the LDS Church's Southern States Mission

Quorum of the Twelve Apostles
- October 12, 1933 – January 21, 1947

LDS Church Apostle
- October 12, 1933 – January 21, 1947
- Reason: Death of James E. Talmage
- Reorganization at end of term: Henry D. Moyle ordained

Personal details
- Born: Charles Albert Callis; May 4, 1865; Dublin, Ireland
- Died: January 21, 1947 (aged 81); Jacksonville, Florida, United States
- Resting place: Salt Lake City Cemetery; 40.777°N 111.858°W
- Spouse(s): Grace Elizabeth Pack
- Children: 8
- Parents: John and Susannah Callis

Charles Albert Callis (4 May 1865 – 21 January 1947) was a leader and missionary in the Church of Jesus Christ of Latter-day Saints (LDS Church). He was ordained an apostle by church president Heber J. Grant on October 12, 1933, and remained a member of the Quorum of the Twelve Apostles until his death.

== Early life ==
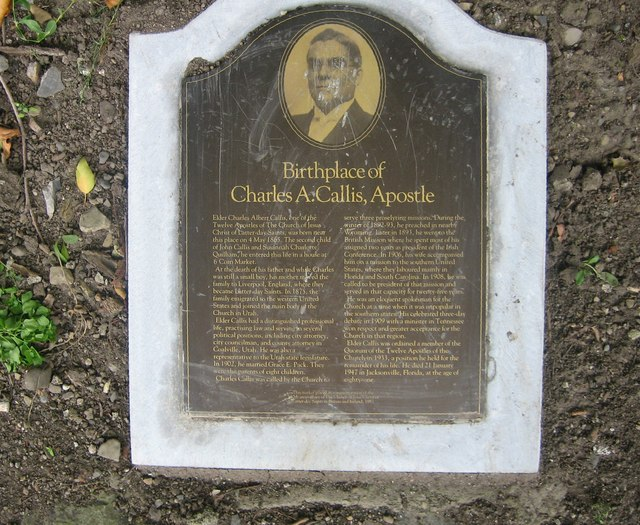
Plaque marking Callis's birthplace

Callis was born on 4 May 1865, in Dublin, Ireland, to John and Susannah Charlotte Callis. While living in England, Callis met LDS Church missionaries in Liverpool and joined the church along with his three siblings and their widowed mother. The Callis family immigrated to the Utah Territory in 1875 and settled in Davis County, Utah, first in Bountiful and later in Centerville. At age 16, Callis moved to Coalville in Summit County, where he worked in the coal mines for 11 years.

His mother later married Thomas Wallace Williams on July 25, 1878, and they had several children.

In 1891, Callis was elected constable of Coalville. In 1892, he served as a missionary in Wyoming under the direction of the Summit Stake. From December 1892 until June 1895, he served as a missionary in the British Isles, including time in the Liverpool Conference. He later served as a missionary in Iowa.

In 1896, at the age of 31, Callis was elected to the Utah House of Representatives; he served in the 1st Utah State Legislature. In 1898, Callis became the attorney for Summit County.

In 1902, Callis married Grace Elizabeth Pack, a granddaughter of John Pack, and they were the parents of eight children.

== Missions ==
Callis, his wife, and their two daughters moved to Florida in 1905 to perform missionary work. Callis was soon admitted to the Florida bar, and he worked to defend church missionaries in legal cases, such as the 1907 case against George Perry in Darlington, South Carolina. In 1907, the Callis family returned home to Utah, but were almost immediately sent back to the southern United States, this time with Callis appointed to head the South Carolina Conference.

In 1908, Callis was called as president of the church's Southern States Mission, succeeding Ben E. Rich. He held this position until his call as a member of the Quorum of the Twelve in 1933. When he began his tenure as mission president, he presided over 250 missionaries spread across 10 states.

== Apostle ==
Callis became an LDS Church apostle on 12 October 1933, filling the vacancy in the Quorum of the Twelve created by the death of James E. Talmage. Callis served as a member of the Quorum of the Twelve until his death, with Henry D. Moyle filling the vacancy created by his death.

Richard E. Bennett wrote of Callis: "Today Elder Charles A. Callis is an almost forgotten figure among younger members of the Church. Yet to those who knew him, he was utterly memorable." Nephi Jensen, a fellow missionary who worked with him in Jacksonville, Florida, wrote:

C. A. Callis in many respects [is] a very remarkable man. He is one of those heroic souls who have come up from the depths. A few years ago he was working in a coal mine in Utah, now he is a practicing attorney and has been admitted to the bar in two states. Without opportunities or aid from friends he has risen by the sovereignty of his determination to an enviable station in life. He not only acquired a knowledge of law by self effort but read widely on general subjects and trained himself in the art of public speaking. He is an able, pleasing and convincing orator.

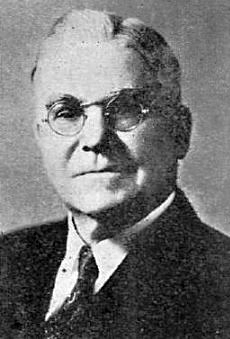
Callis as a member of the Quorum of the Twelve Apostles

The guiding light and inspiration for Callis was always Jesus Christ. He once said, “From my earliest recollections to the present time I have always had an abiding and intense love for my Savior. I cannot read the story of His sufferings and crucifixion without shedding tears.

As an apostle, Callis authored one book, Fundamentals of Religion (Deseret Book, 1945), a collection of seventeen lectures about the tenets of the LDS Church he gave over national radio in 1943.

== Death ==
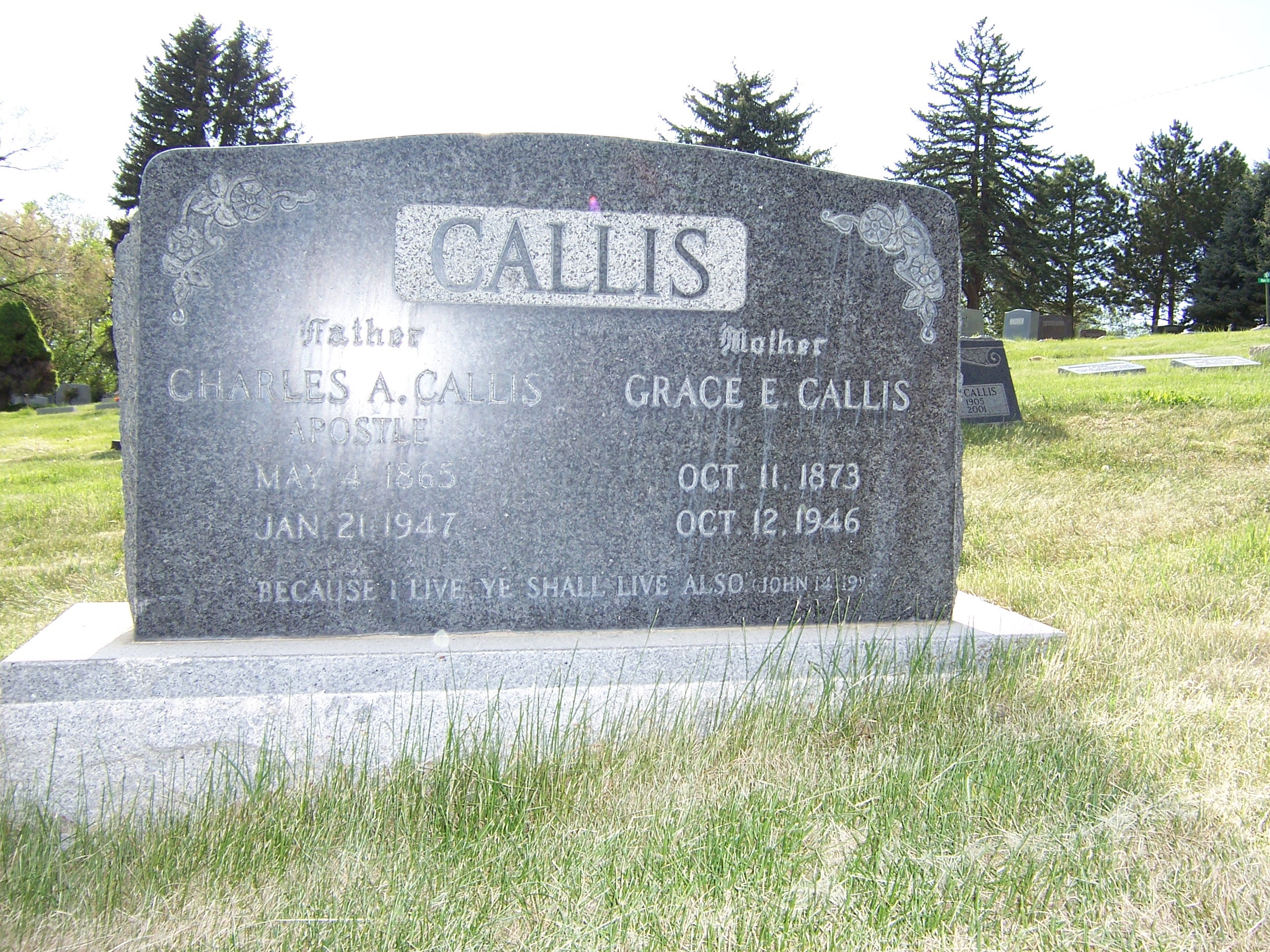
Grave marker of Charles A. Callis

Callis died of a massive heart attack on 21 January 1947. His wife's death, which had occurred in October 1946, deeply affected Callis, and he never fully recovered from that loss. Callis died in Jacksonville, Florida, at the age of 81, the day after meetings were held to organize the church's first stake in the Southern United States. He referred to this event as the "crowning achievement" of his life. The day before he died, Callis told many at the church meeting that he saw his wife many times everywhere he went. That night, he wrote to his daughter: "The Lord gave me strength to go through with the organization. With his aid I am battling through. I feel that your mother is not far from us." Funeral services for Callis were held both in Jacksonville and in Salt Lake City. He was buried in Salt Lake City Cemetery.

== Quotes ==
"The awakening of the conscience is the grandeur of the soul."

"In far too many cases riches and their owners change places—the riches own the owners. Money will become the master if it is not made to be the servant."

“The greatest thrilling experience that you and I can ever have in our hearts will be on those occasions when deep down we receive the witness that our acts and our labors are approved by our Heavenly Father.”

"This is the world in which to cultivate righteous tendencies and just causes that will produce, in the world to come, results and harvests of perfection and heavenly fruit."

== Memorials ==
There is a plaque in St. Audoen's Park, Dublin, to commemorate the Birthplace of Callis.

== Works ==
- Callis, Charles A. (1945). Fundamentals of religion: A series of radio addresses. Independence, Missouri: Zion's Printing and Pub. Co. OCLC 7057249.

== See also ==
- The Church of Jesus Christ of Latter-day Saints in Ireland

The Church of Jesus Christ of Latter-day Saints titles
Preceded by Joseph F. Merrill	Quorum of the Twelve Apostles; October 12, 1933–January 21, 1947	Succeeded by J. Reuben Clark
