= T. Earl Pardoe =

American academic (1885–1971)

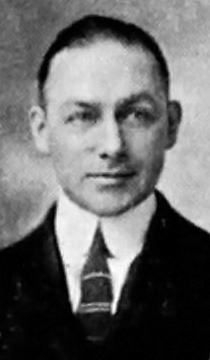
T. Earl Pardoe 1922

Thomas Earl Pardoe (1885–1971) was the first head of the Brigham Young University (BYU) drama program. One of the main theaters in the Harris Fine Arts Center at BYU is named for him and his wife, Kathryn Bassett Pardoe, who was also an influential drama teacher at BYU.

== Life ==
Pardoe was born and raised in Ogden, Utah. Pardoe was involved in high school and community dramatic productions, but when he went to Stanford University, it was to study engineering. In his studies, he discovered that he was more suited to a career in theatre. He returned to Ogden and worked as a stagehand and back-up actor for the Ogden Opera Company before going to study at the Leland Powers School in Boston. While there he also served as a missionary for the Church of Jesus Christ of Latter-day Saints (LDS Church), in part because his uncle, Ben E. Rich, was the mission president. While in Boston, Pardoe also performed with the Boston Grand Opera and was a correspondent for the Deseret News. Pardoe graduated from Leland Powers in 1913.

Pardoe then returned to Ogden where he met Kathryn Bassett when he played the lead male role to her female lead in a comedic opera. They were married on June 3, 1914, with the ceremony performed by David O. McKay. Pardoe then became a drama and speech teacher at Weber Academy, the predecessor of Weber State University.

In 1916, Pardoe taught at BYU's summer session. In 1919, he came to BYU working as a tennis coach and also to teach drama and public speaking. He also earned a bachelor's degree from BYU in 1925. In 1927, Pardoe left BYU to teach at the Major School of Theatre in Los Angeles.

Pardoe later earned a master's degree in psychology from the University of Southern California. During this time, he also served as director of the Long Beach Little Theatre. Pardoe then earned a Ph.D. in speech from Louisiana State University. He returned to BYU where he served as head of the speech department. From 1952 until his death in 1971, Pardoe primarily worked with the BYU Alumni Association, serving as BYU Historian. Up until this point Pardoe had been the only head of BYU's drama department. He seems to have taught drama classes even after his appointment as historian, which in theory had meant he had retired.

Pardoe was president of the Utah Speech Association, the Rocky Mountain Forensic League, and the Western Speech Association at various times during his career. Pardoe wrote multiple speech and drama textbooks, as well as The Sons of Brigham, which is a history of the early presidents, professors, and graduates of BYU.

Pardoe also later served as a member of the general board of the Young Men's Mutual Improvement Association of the LDS Church. In 1954 and 1955, Pardoe served a second LDS mission in New England.
