= The Church of Jesus Christ of Latter-day Saints in Ireland =

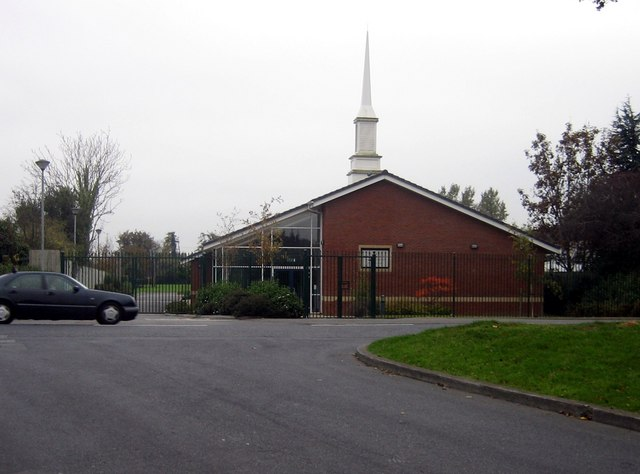
- LDS Meetinghouse in Clonsilla, Ireland
- Area: Europe North
- Members: 4,923 (2025)
- Stakes: 1
- Wards: 6
- Branches: 6
- Total congregations: 12
- Temples: 1 announced
- FamilySearch Centers: 3

The Church of Jesus Christ of Latter-day Saints in Northern Ireland
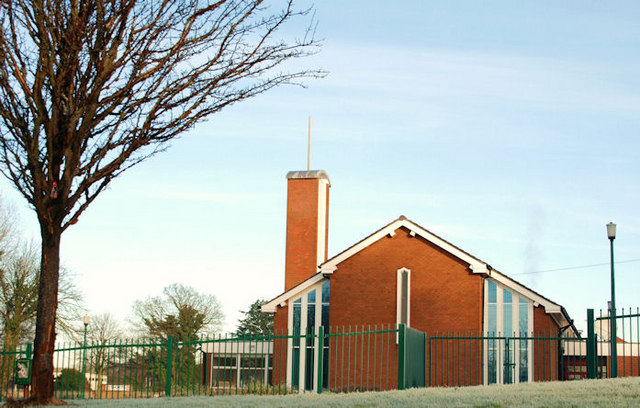
- Stake Centre in Belfast, Northern Ireland
- Area: Europe North
- Members: 5,345 (2016)
- Stakes: 1
- Wards: 7
- Branches: 3
- Total congregations: 10
- FamilySearch Centers: 3

The Church of Jesus Christ of Latter-day Saints has had a presence in the island of Ireland since at least 1840, when the Elder John Taylor first preached in Newry. He and other missionaries converted a number of Irish people, forming a branch in Hillsborough, County Down. Many of the converted Irish saints emigrated in order to escape poverty (and later famine), as well as to live in majority Latter Day Saint communities. Missionary efforts continued in the 1850s, and a small branch was established in Dublin, but many members emigrated to Utah or lost interest in the church. In 1867, the Irish mission was placed in the care of the British mission. A new branch was formed in Belfast in 1884 and a Dublin branch was reestablished in 1900. All of this occurred despite anti-Mormon disturbances by local Irish people.

Beginning in 1907, Irish church members were asked to remain in their home country to build up the church. This plea by local ecclesiastical leaders initiated a new era of stability for the church in Ireland. In 1948, the first church-owned meeting house was constructed, and in 1953, Northern Ireland welcomed President David O. McKay as the first prophet to visit that region. With Stephen Covey as president of the newly formed Irish mission, in 1962, the number of conversions quadrupled within an 18-month period. By 1974 a stake of Zion was established in Northern Ireland.

In 2017, Northern Ireland had 5,345 members and as of 2025, the Republic of Ireland had 4,923 members. Both stakes in Ireland are part of the Preston England Temple District, as there are currently no Temples of the Church of Jesus Christ of Latter-day Saints in Ireland.

As of February 2018, Mark Coffey is the president of the Dublin Ireland Stake.

== History ==
=== 1840–1850: Early missionary efforts ===
==== First missionaries ====
The first official Mormon missionary activity in Northern Ireland occurred on 23 May 1840 when Reuben Hedlock became the first known Latter-day Saint to visit the area. He was only there for three days, but was followed shortly after by other LDS members. On 28 July 1840, John Taylor and two Irish men, who were converted to the Church of Jesus Christ of Latter-day Saints in England, preached in Newry. After their first night of preaching, no one asked to be baptized, so the missionaries announced a second meeting that would be held the following night. This meeting did not have very many in attendance, so they left for Newry the next day. This gave Taylor the opportunity to discuss the gospel with Thomas Tate during travel. On 31 July 1840 they baptized Tate, who was the first convert in Ireland, in a lough near Loughbrickland. John Taylor preached four times in Lisburn before leaving Ireland on 6 August.

After Taylor left, the first permanent missionary, Theodore Curtis, was assigned to labor in Ireland on 11 September 1840. He began proselytizing in Hillsborough. A few weeks later, the first branch containing 35 members was established in Hillsborough. Reuben Hedlock returned in October 1840 and was the first missionary to preach in Belfast. David Wilkie was sent as a full-time missionary in July 1841 after Curtis was reassigned. He was later joined by James Carigan. Under the work of the two elders, the church grew to 71 members. These missionaries left the following year.

Joseph Smith called James Sloan and his wife to serve as missionaries in Ireland on 29 May 1843. They arrived in September and did not experience much success. They organized a new branch in Mallusk, but Sloan reported at a mission conference in 1844 that there were only 52 church members in total. He also reported that landlords threatened to evict their tenants if they listened to church teachings; Sloan was reassigned to work in England, leaving Ireland without missionaries.

==== Irish famine ====
During this time, between 1845 and 1847, the Irish Famine reached its peak; the church's growth began to stagger. Other missionaries were assigned for short periods of time, but they reported on the difficulty of preaching the gospel in such grim conditions. In 1848 the Belfast Conference was established, containing the branches of Belfast, Hyde Park, Kilachy, and Lisburn. Due to the poor conditions, the church leaders counseled members to emigrate to the United States. Many members heeded this instruction, causing many faithful members to leave Ireland. Hedlock, who became mission president, organized emigration ships that helped Mormon Saints and other Irish emigrants to the United States. This decrease in membership led to an increase in missionary work. Four missionaries from Scotland were sent to revive missionary efforts.

=== 1850–1870: Church expansion and decline ===
In June 1850, two elders, Gilbert Clements and John Lindsay, were sent to Belfast to revive what was left of the church and missionary efforts. The branch in that area had disestablished itself and did not have a public place to hold meetings. The missionaries obtained a chapel that had previously been owned by the Baptist Church. At the same time that Clements and Lindsay were regathering the saints in Belfast, Elders Sutherland and Bowering were sent to preach in Dublin and were the first missionaries in that area. Because citizens there did not know much about the church, they held public lectures to increase awareness. By September, they had organized a branch in Dublin of six converts.

Missionaries in Dublin faced increasing opposition from Protestant groups at Trinity College. They faced mobs, robbing, arson, and other violent acts, which unfortunately was not uncommon to Church missionaries during this time period. Despite this persecution, missionaries continued to be sent to the area and were met with more success during the mid-1850s. The law of tithing was established in 1856, and church membership increased gradually. This success was abruptly halted, however, because Mormon missionaries from the United States who were serving in Northern Ireland were called home due to the Utah War in 1857. American missionaries did not return until 1861, but missionary efforts were continued by local church members.

In the absence of missionaries, Ireland experienced a religious revival. Many Protestant sects attracted large congregations and the Irish peoples participated in more public devotion. Since there were no official representatives from the church, there were few converts during this time of religious focus, and Irish church members had very little contact with church leaders; church membership began to decline once more. Because missionary success had declined in the 1860s, church leaders encouraged members to emigrate to Utah to gather with the other Saints. American missionaries returned in 1861, but had little success. After several failed missionary efforts, the Irish mission was closed in 1867, and the Dublin and Belfast Conferences were placed under the care of the British Mission.

=== 1870–1900: Third missionary campaign ===
Missionary efforts began once again in Ireland when missionaries Robert Marshall and George Wilson began proselytizing in May 1884. When they arrived in Belfast, there were no longer any known Mormons there. After preaching for several months, they had their first baptisms in August and created a new branch in Belfast in October of that year. Riots during the summer of 1886 caused church meetings to be temporarily cancelled. Despite this, 214 new converts joined the church between 1884 and 1900. The branch in Dublin was also reorganized in 1900.

During this time period, the church tried to establish and maintain a more permanent presence in Ireland, attempting to institute auxiliary programs like the Mutual Improvement Association and Sunday School. Initially these efforts proved to be futile, and it was not until the 20th century that they were successfully integrated as church programs in Ireland. A semi-annual Irish mission conference began in August 1889. These meetings were intended for church members and missionaries and helped establish the permanence of the church in the area.

Missionaries also faced persecution in the form of mobs, stoning, smoking out of church meetings, and on one occasion, a foghorn, among other acts that often disturbed church gatherings. Mormon missionaries also had a hard time finding halls or other places to hold meetings, since the church still did not own its own meetinghouse, which also limited growth of the church in the region. This attitude continued into the 20th century, as evidenced by several anti-Mormon plays written and shown in theaters in Belfast during the summer of 1913.

=== 1900–1960: Improving the church's image ===
By 1907, church leaders urged that members remain in their own countries instead of emigrating to Utah, in order to build up the church in their own cities. This initiative allowed the church in Ireland to establish more permanent branches. In addition, the church worked to improve its image in the country during the 20th century. With the successful implementation of the Relief Society, Mutual Improvement Association, Primary, and increased numbers of priesthood holders, the church was strengthened and received favor in the eyes of the Irish public. The church's welfare program that started in 1936 also helped many Irish citizens gain more respect for Mormons.

==== Partition of Ireland and Irish Civil War ====
In 1921, the Partition of Ireland occurred, dividing the island into Northern Ireland (which remained in the UK), and the Free State, which later became the Republic. The Partition was very controversial, and led to the Irish Civil War. Because of all the political upheaval, the mission was reorganized during this time. Prior to 1922, all Latter-day Saints and missionaries in Ireland were organized as the Irish Conference. With the creation of Northern Ireland, Saints there were organized under a newly formed "Ulster Conference" on 1 October 1922, although Northern Ireland did not contain all of Ulster. David O. McKay formalized this split on 30 September 1923.

However, the LDS Church would later reunite the two conferences under a newly formed Irish District on 31 March 1935, organizing Latter-day Saints in both Northern Ireland and the Republic of Ireland together.

==== World War II ====
Just prior to World War II, the church began to be recognized on a local level in Belfast when the Mormon Millennial Chorus visited Ireland in 1938. A group of young girls began an exercise group that specialized in folk dancing and military drills in Belfast in 1937, and they went on to perform for large audiences and even competed in the Belfast Cooperative Hall in 1939. This group, known as the "Keep Fit" girls, even went on to perform in Britain.

Due to the rising tension of the war, Irish missionaries were pulled out of Ireland and other European countries and relocated to the United States. The Second World War led to huge challenges for both members and missionaries. Northern Ireland entered the war as part of the United Kingdom, with the city of Belfast as a frequent target for bomb activity so the members in the city faced highly unfavourable conditions and "reported barely escaping death". The Republic was officially neutral, but it also endured some minor bombing by the Germans, and some of its citizens fought for the Allies.

The war resulted in a decline in church activity because many members worked in factories to produce materials for soldiers in the Allied Forces. Members continued to hold meetings, although conditions were poor and there was little contact from church leaders outside the country. After the war ended, the church obtained its own meetinghouse in Ireland and dedicated it on 8 March 1948.

==== Post-war expansion ====
The church experienced growth after the war. A new branch was organized in Bangor in 1950, making it the third in Ireland. This branch started with only 12 members, but grew to 94 in 1962. A fourth branch was created in Portadown in 1951, although it did not grow as fast as the Bangor branch. Church members took an interest in genealogy work after the war. During 1950 and 1951, microfilming of Irish records was led by James R. Cunningham, although some areas like the Public Record Office in Belfast withheld their records. By June 1951, Mormon genealogists were able to make duplicates of all records available at the time, and copies were sent to church headquarters in the United States.

David O. McKay visited Ireland in 1953 while serving as the president of the church as part of a European tour. He dedicated a site for a temple near London. This temple was dedicated on 7 September 1958, and was available to saints across Europe, including Ireland. An Irish temple day was held on 10 January 1959, specifically so that church members in Ireland could attend.

=== 1960–present ===
Due to the increasing number of members in Ireland, the Irish Mission was formed on 8 July 1962. Stephen R. Covey was called to serve as the mission president. With the creation of a separate mission, membership rose from 600 to 2,500 in only 18 months, and the number of missionaries sent to Ireland increased dramatically. By the end of the 1960s, there were more missionaries preaching in Ireland at one time than had ever been in the country since missionaries were sent in 1840. Within one year of creating the Irish mission, church membership had increased over twofold, and would continue to increase over the coming decades. The increase in membership called for the building of four chapels in Northern Ireland during the 1960s. The first stake was created in Northern Ireland in 1974.

==== Republic of Ireland ====
Missionaries were not present in the Republic of Ireland when the Irish mission was formed in 1962. Missionary efforts began again when six missionaries were sent to Dublin. During that year, small branches were created in Limerick and Cork, although the missionaries did not hold their first baptism until December 1963. Mission President Steven Covey was able to meet with the president of Ireland and former Taoiseach, Éamon de Valera, in 1964. De Valera had visited Salt Lake City as a young boy and, therefore, listened to the Coveys discuss principles of Mormonism during their visit.

== Church status today ==
As of December 2011, the Church of Jesus Christ of Latter-day Saints (the largest Latter Day Saint denomination) reports to have 2,915 members in the Republic of Ireland. This differs from the 2006 and 2011 censuses which show, respectively, 1237 and 1284 people self-reporting as Latter-day Saints in the Republic. LDS Church membership statistics are typically different from attendance and self-reporting statistics mainly because the LDS Church does not remove an individual's name from its membership rolls based on inactivity in the church.

As of October 2016, there are 13 congregations in the Republic of Ireland. As of December 2011, there were 11 congregations in Northern Ireland. Well-known Irish Latter day Saints include Charles Albert Callis, who was a member of the Quorum of the Twelve Apostles, and Robert Sands, who was the fifth conductor of the Mormon Tabernacle Choir.

Stake Centers on island of Ireland
Green = Stake Center

== Congregations ==
On Sunday 5th of May 2024, a Special Conference attended by Elder Mark G. Stewart was held in the Finglas Chapel, Dublin. Members of the Church in the Dublin Stake and Limerick District were invited. The subject of the Conference was the merging of the Stake and District to form the Dublin Ireland Stake, which would cover the entire Republic of Ireland. Involved in this merge was the reunification of Terenure Wards 1 and 2 into Terenure Ward, and the turning of the Limerick Branch and Cork Branch into the Limerick Ward and Cork Ward.

As of May 2024, Ireland and Northern Ireland had the following congregations:

Belfast Northern Ireland Stake

- Antrim Branch
- Bangor 1st Ward
- Bangor 2nd Ward
- Cavehill Ward
- Coleraine Branch
- Foyle Ward
- Holywood Road Ward
- Lisburn Ward
- Omagh Branch
- Portadown Ward

Dublin Ireland Stake

- Clondalkin Ward
- Clonsilla Ward
- Cork Ward
- Dundalk Branch
- Finglas Ward
- Galway Branch
- Limerick Ward
- Mullingar Branch
- Sligo Branch
- Terenure Ward
- Tralee Branch
- Waterford Branch

== Missions ==
The Ireland Dublin Mission was established in 1962 with Steven R. Covey as its first mission president. Then in July, 2010 the mission was merged with the Scotland Edinburgh Mission to form the new The Scotland Ireland Mission, based in Edinburgh.

== Temples ==
On the 6th of October 2024, at the Sunday afternoon session of general conference, Church President Russell M. Nelson made the announcement of a future Temple in Dublin Ireland. There are no Temples of the Church in Ireland itself. The nearest Temple to the country is the Preston England Temple in the north west of England which serves both the Dublin Ireland Stake and the Belfast Northern Ireland Stake. The London England Temple had at one time served the Limerick Ireland District.

358. Dublin Ireland Temple (Announced); Official website; News & images	
Location: Announced:	Dublin, Ireland; 6 October 2024 by Russell M. Nelson

== Notable Irish Latter-day Saints ==
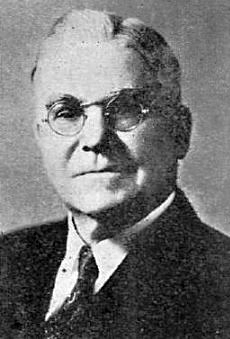
Charles A. Callis

Although it was commonly assumed that Joseph Smith was of primarily English descent, modern DNA testing of Smith's relatives suggests that his family were of Irish descent, as he carried a rare Y-DNA marker within Haplogroup R1b which is found almost entirely in people of Northwestern Irish descent.

- Charles A. Callis
- William Law (Latter Day Saints)
- Paul O'Connor (skier)
- Kim L. O'Neill
- Robert Sands (conductor)
- Alex Sharpe
- Edward L. Sloan
- James Sloan (Latter Day Saints)
- Jason Smyth
- Wingfield W. Watson
- Barbara Retz

== See also ==
- Christianity in Ireland
- Nontrinitarianism
- Religion in Northern Ireland
- Religion in the Republic of Ireland

== Bibliography ==
Barlow, Brent A. (May 1968), History of the Church of Jesus Christ of Latter-day Saints in Ireland since 1840: MA Thesis, Provo: Department of Graduate Studies in Religious Instruction, Brigham Young University, p. 63
