= The Betty White Show =

The Betty White Show refers to several shows hosted by Betty White:

- The Betty White Show (1952 TV series), which aired on NBC in 1954, having originated locally two years prior
- The Betty White Show (1958 TV series), which aired on ABC in 1958
- The Betty White Show (1977 TV series), which aired on CBS in 1977 and 1978
