= Reta Shaw =

American actress (1912–1982)

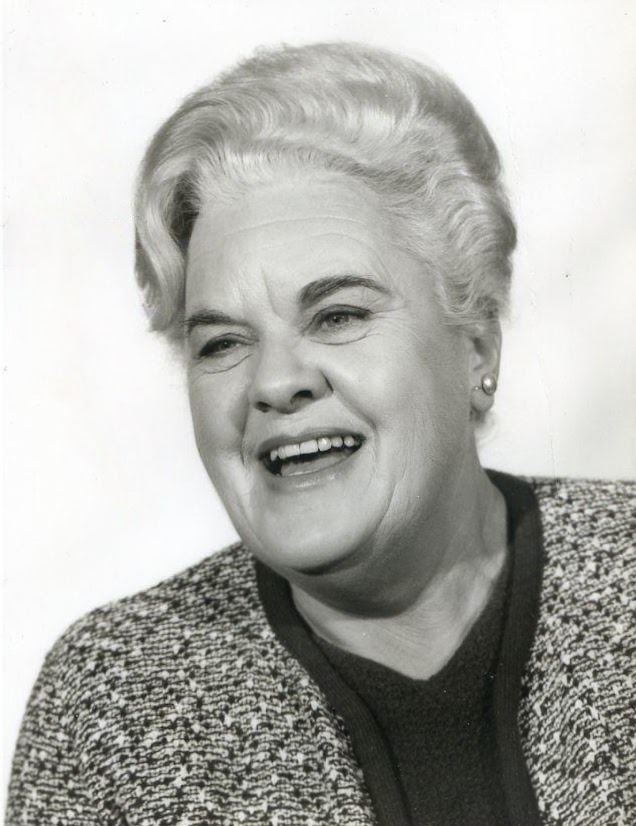
- Shaw in The Ghost & Mrs. Muir (1968)
- Born: Reta Marguerite Shaw; September 13, 1912; South Paris, Maine, U.S.
- Died: January 8, 1982 (aged 69); Encino, California, U.S.
- Occupation: Actress
- Years active: 1935–1975
- Spouse: William A. Forester (divorced)
- Children: 1

Reta Marguerite Shaw (September 13, 1912 – January 8, 1982) was an American character actress known for playing strong, hard-edged, working women in film and on many of the most popular television programs of the 1960s and 1970s in the United States. She may be best remembered as the housekeeper, Martha Grant, on the television series The Ghost & Mrs. Muir and as the cook, Mrs. Brill, in the 1964 film Mary Poppins.

== Early life ==
Reta M. Shaw was born in South Paris, Maine, on September 13, 1912, to Howard Shaw. Her father was an orchestra leader. Shaw's younger sister was actress Marguerite Shaw. The daughter and granddaughter of women who believed in spiritualism, Shaw reportedly once told a newspaper interviewer that she had been "brought up on a ouija board."

Shaw graduated from Paris High School in 1929, and was awarded the Alumni Prize, as well as a varsity letter for her role as manager of the girls track team, at commencement. She sang at the South Paris Congregational Church and participated in amateur theatricals, and would later study acting and graduate from the Leland Powers School of the Theater in Boston, Massachusetts.

== Career ==
After attending Leland Powers School, Shaw pursued professional theater as a performer, accompanist, music director, and teacher, including time on the faculty of the Bishop-Lee School of theatre and platform art, which opened in the fall of 1934, an outgrowth of the Berkshire Theatre Workshop, conducted by "Mrs. Bishop and Mrs. Lee (Emily Perry Bishop, Adele Hoes Lee), long at Leland Powers School". in Boston, and several seasons of summer stock in Malden Bridge, NY. In 1936–1937, Shaw spent a year as vocal coach and teaching acting for children at the Studio Theater School in Buffalo, New York, as well as performing with Studio Theater players in plays including "Spring Dance" by Philip Barry, She directed the one-act play, "So's Your Old Antique" by Clare Kummer for Studio Theater Workshop, and also performed on local radio in Buffalo. Shaw subsequently did comedy work in night clubs, and during World War II joined the Red Cross Entertainment Unit, serving for three years, mostly overseas, including 18 months in Iceland.

Shaw's first credited appearance on the Broadway stage was in 1947's It Takes Two. She then appeared in Virginia Reel and on Broadway in a comedic role as Mabel in the original production of The Pajama Game in 1954, as well as in Gentlemen Prefer Blondes, Picnic, and Annie Get Your Gun, the last on tour with Mary Martin. She had featured roles in several motion pictures, including Picnic, The Pajama Game, Mary Poppins, Pollyanna, The Ghost and Mr. Chicken, Bachelor in Paradise and Escape to Witch Mountain.

She appeared in the first season (1958–1959) of The Ann Sothern Show in the role of Flora Macauley, the overbearing wife of Jason Macauley, played by Ernest Truex. She appeared in Pollyanna in 1960 as Tillie Langerlof. In the 1960–1961 season, she played the housekeeper Thelma on The Tab Hunter Show. She played a housekeeper in the 1961–1962 series Ichabod and Me and the Wiere Brothers′ landlady Mrs. Stansfield in Oh! Those Bells in 1962.

In 1961, she was cast as Cora in the episode "Uncle Paul's New Wife" of Pete and Gladys, starring Harry Morgan and Cara Williams. In that installment, Uncle Paul is played by Gale Gordon, a semi-regular on the series. During the 1964–1965 season, she was reunited with Williams with a recurring role on The Cara Williams Show as Mrs. Burkhardt, the wife of a business executive.

Shaw appears in a 1962 episode of the series Outlaws with Barton MacLane. She also plays a comic role for The Lucy Show as a grandmother who sits on a $500 bill that Lucy lost and soon after sits on Lucy's hand in the episode "Lucy Misplaces $2,000". Thereafter, she guest starred in the CBS anthology series The Lloyd Bridges Show. She appears too as the bar hostess Teeney in the 1964 episode "The Richard Bloodgood Story" of the series Wagon Train. Shaw's character of Bertha/Hagatha, a matronly witch, is a recurring character on TV's Bewitched, and she performed as Miss Gormley in an episode of The Brian Keith Show.

Shaw appeared twice in CBS's The Andy Griffith Show, as escaped convict Big Maude Tyler ("Convicts at Large") and as Eleanora Poultice, the educated voice teacher of Barney Fife ("The Song Festers"). She guest-stars as well as Aunt Clara in the 1965 episode "Return from Outer Space") of Lost in Space. In the 1966 feature film The Ghost and Mr. Chicken Shaw portrays the banker's wife and leader of the "Psychic Occult Society", Mrs. Halcyon Maxwell. In 1967, she played a THRUSH Agent, "Miss Witherspoon", in an episode of The Man from U.N.C.L.E.

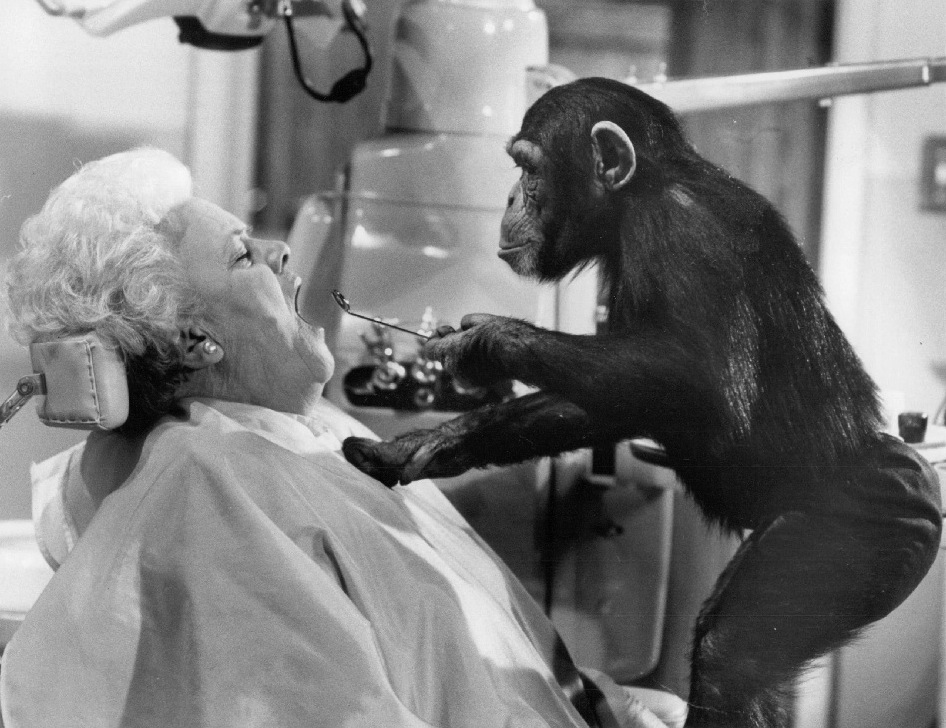
Shaw and Buttons in Me and the Chimp. (1971)

On television, Shaw was also seen in Mister Peepers, Armstrong Circle Theatre, Alfred Hitchcock Presents and The Millionaire. In 1965, she appeared on The Dick Van Dyke Show as an unemployment office worker. In 1965, she also appeared in an episode of My Three Sons. She played a housekeeper named Fredocia whom Steve had hired after Bub took a trip to Ireland. That particular episode was Uncle Charley's first appearance. In 1966, she appeared in a bit part on That Girl as a department-store organist. In 1966, she appeared as Bessie, an undercover agent, in the episode of I Spy titled "Lisa".

Shaw co-starred on the sitcom The Ghost & Mrs. Muir where she played housekeeper Martha Grant. The show took place in the fictional fishing village of Schooner Bay, Maine while Shaw was born in South Paris, Maine.

Shaw appeared in a season 4 episode of I Dream of Jeannie titled "Jeannie and the Wild Pipchicks", in which she played a strict Air Force dietician who has her innermost inhibition released (in her case a beautiful butterfly). In The Odd Couple, she appeared as a nanny who was a former army colonel in the episode "Maid for Each Other", which aired on November 23, 1973. In 1973 she played country nurse Ozella Peterson in the Emergency! episode "Snakebite". She also played in an episode of the crime drama Barnaby Jones, 1973 season 2 episode 2 titled Death Leap. She played an old friend of Barnaby's and owned a Fruit market, when Barnaby turned to her for information on a case he was investigating. In 1974, on Happy Days, she played the babysitter Mrs. McCarthy in the episode titled "Breaking Up Is Hard to Do". Her final performance came in the 1975 film Escape to Witch Mountain in the role of Mrs. Grindley, owner of the orphanage where Tia and Tony are sent after the death of their foster parents.

== Personal life and death ==
Shaw married and divorced actor William Forester. While married, the couple had one child, daughter Kathryn Anne Forester.

Shaw died in 1982 at age 69 from emphysema in Encino, California.

== Filmography ==
Year	Title	Role	Notes
1953-1954	Johnny Jupiter	Mrs. Clandish	7 episodes
1953-1955	Mister Peepers	Aunt Lillian	12 episodes
1955	Picnic	Irma Kronkite	
1955	All Mine to Give	Mrs. Runyon	
1956	The Life of Riley	Mrs. Hayes	2 episodes
1956	Studio 57		S3;E2: "My Friends, the Birds"
1956	Alfred Hitchcock Presents	Martha Stone	Season 1 Episode 38: "The Creeper"
1957	Man Afraid	Nurse Willis	
1957	The Pajama Game	Mabel	
1956-1958	The Millionaire	Mrs. Stringer/Margaret Dubrock	2 episodes
1957-1962	The Real McCoys	Miss Amory/Eunice Webster	2 episodes
1958	The Betty White Show	Mrs. Peterson	2 episodes
1958	The Lady Takes a Flyer	Nurse Kennedy	
1958	Date with the Angels	Mrs.Lyons	S2;E19: "Double Trouble"
1958-1959	The Ann Sothern Show	Flora McCauley	9 episodes
1960	Fibber McGee and Molly	Mrs. Nolan	S1;E24: "Molly's Political Career"
1960	The Tab Hunter Show	Thelma	10 episodes
1960-1962	The Many Loves of Dobie Gillis	Mrs. Finchley	2 episodes
1960	Pollyanna	Tillie Lagerlof	
1961	Sanctuary	Miss Reba	
1961	Bachelor in Paradise	Mrs. Brown	
1961	Checkmate	Nora Flannery	S1;E17: "Don't Believe a Word She Says"
1961	Pete and Gladys	Cora	S2;E5: "Uncle Paul's New Wife"
1961-62	Ichabod and Me	Livvy	3 episodes
1962	Oh! Those Bells	Mrs. Stanfield	13 episodes
1962	The Andy Griffith Show	"Big Maude" Tyler	S3;E11: "Convicts-at-Large"
1962	Thriller	Celia Hooper Somers	S2;E24: "Til Death Do Us Part"
1962	Follow the Sun	Bertha Bullfinch	S1;E23: "The Irresistible Miss Bullfinch"
1962	Father of the Bride	Hortense Dithers	2 episodes
1962	Outlaws	Mrs. Bond	S2;E13: "The Dark Sunrise of Griff Kincaid"
1962-1965	My Three Sons	Mrs. Bradshaw	2 episodes
1962-1966	The Lucy Show	Dora Dunbar/Mrs. Foley	3 episodes
1963	Alcoa Premiere	The Nurse	S2;E29: "Million Dollar Hospital"
1963	The Lloyd Bridges Show	Mrs. Ardmore	S1;E28: "The Tyrees of Capitol Hill"
1963-1964	Vacation Playhouse	Mrs. Foley/Aunt Josie	2 episodes
1964-1972	Bewitched	Aunt Hagatha/Bertha	4 episodes
1964	The Farmer's Daughter	Elsa	S1;E18: "Cousin Helga Came to Dinner"
1964	Wagon Train	Teeney	S8;E10: "The Richard Bloodgood Story"
1964	Bob Hope Presents the Chrysler Theatre	Penny	S2;E1: "Think Pretty"
1964	A Global Affair	Nurse Argyle	
1964	Mary Poppins	Mrs. Brill, The Cook	
1964	The Andy Griffith Show	Eleanora Poultice	Season 4 Episode 20: "The Song Festers"
1964-1965	The Cara Williams Show	Mrs. Burkhardt	2 episodes
1965	That Funny Feeling	Woman at Phone Booth	
1965	Marriage on the Rocks	Saleslady at Saks	Uncredited
1965	The Loved One	Manager of The Zomba Cafe	Directed by Tony Richardson
1965	Lost in Space	Aunt Clara Simms	S1;E15: "Return from Outer Space"
1965	Profiles in Courage	Mrs. Jaffray	S1;E14: "Woodrow Wilson"
1965	The Dick Van Dyke Show	Dawn McCracken	S5;E14: "Fifty-Two, Forty-Five or Work"
1965	Valentine's Day	Mrs. Dunstall	S1;E33: "I'll Cry at My Wedding"
1965-1970	The Red Skelton Show	Mrs. Abigail Throckmorton/Kitty Klump	7 episodes
1966	The Ghost and Mr. Chicken	Mrs. Halcyon Maxwell	
1966	Made in Paris	American Bar Singer	
1966	The Monkees	Mra. Badderly	S1;E15: "Too Many Girls"
1966	I Spy	Bessie McGivney	S2;E13: "Lisa"
1966	That Girl	Organ Saleslady	S1;E14: "Phantom of the Horse Opera"
1966	Love on a Rooftop	Lillian	S1;E12: "Dave's Night Out"
1966	The Patty Duke Show	Eloise Sutton	S3;E22: "Patty Leads a Dog's Life"
1966	The Adventures of Ozzie and Harriet	Mrs. Lockwood	S14;E24: "Dave's Other Office"
1967	Please Don't Eat the Daisies	Mrs. Swanson	S2;E19: "The Officer of the Court"
1967	The Man from U.N.C.L.E.	Miss Witherspoon	S3;E17: "The Suburbia Affair"
1967	The Girl from U.N.C.L.E.	Mrs. Sedley	S1;E20: "The Fountain of Youth Affair"
1967	The Danny Thomas Hour	Receptionist	S1;E10: "The Zero Man"
1968	I Dream of Jeannie	Colonel Abigail Finch/Annie	3 episodes
1968	Mad Mad Scientist	Phoebe	Unsold pilot
1968	The F.B.I.	Shoe Store Customer	S4;E13: "The Hero"
1968	The Carol Burnett Show	Madame Silverspoon	S1;E26: "Gloria Loring and Soupy Sales"
1968-1970	The Ghost & Mrs. Muir	Martha Grant	50 episodes
1968-1973	Here's Lucy	Mrs. Witherspoon/Mabel Ryker	3 episodes
1970	Matt Lincoln	Mrs. Tweed	3 episodes
1971	Murder Once Removed	Nurse Regis	
1971	Arnie	The Maid	S2;E4: "The Maid"
1972	Call Holme	Woman	Unsold pilot
1972	The New Dick Van Dyke Show	Head Nurse	2 episodes
1972	Me and the Chimp	Pearl Cutler	S1;E1: "Mike's Day with Buttons"
1973	Barnaby Jones	Flo	S2;E2: "Death Leap"
1973	Emergency!	Ozella Peterson	S3;E6: "Snakebite"
1973	The Odd Couple	Claire Frost	S4;E11: "Maid for Each Other"
1973	The Little People	Miss Gormley	S1;E16: "Honest Sean Drives Again"
1973	Guess Who's Sleeping in My Bed?	Mrs. Guzmando	ABC Movie of the Week
1973	Cannon	Princess	S3;E15: "Arena of Fear"
1974	The Girl Who Came Gift-Wrapped	Miss Cora Markin	ABC Movie of the Week
1974	The ABC Afternoon Playbreak	Mrs. Tusher	S3;E3: "Oh Baby, Baby, Baby..."
1974	The Toy Game	Adelle	Unsold pilot
1974	Happy Days	Mrs. McCarthy	S1;E9: "Breaking Up is Hard to Do"
1975	Escape to Witch Mountain	Mrs. Grindley	(final film role)
