= Ben Rich =

Ben Rich may refer to:

- Ben Rich (engineer), American engineer
- Ben Rich (weather forecaster), British meteorologist
- Ben E. Rich, missionary and spokesman for the Church of Jesus Christ of Latter-day Saints
