= Variety Hour =

- Directed by: Redd Davis
- Written by: Allison Booth
- Produced by: Herbert Smith
- Starring: Charles Clapham and Bill Dwyer
- Cinematography: Ronald Neame
- Edited by: Reginald Beck
- Production company: Twentieth Century Fox
- Distributed by: Twentieth Century Fox
- Release date: 23 August 1937
- Running time: 66 minutes
- Country: United Kingdom
- Language: English

Variety Hour (also known as Variety Stars of 1937) is a 1937 British musical comedy film directed by Redd Davis and starring Charles Clapham and Bill Dwyer, and a cast of variety artistes. It was written by Alison Booth, and made as a quota quickie at Wembley Studios by the British subsidiary of Twentieth Century Fox. The film's sets were designed by the art director William Hemsley. It is a revue show featuring performers from radio and music hall.

== Synopsis ==
Two radio announcers from America gatecrash the BBC and provide commentary for a review show. The British Film Institute has published a detailed shot breakdown of the film.

== Cast ==
- Charles Clapham and Bill Dwyer as radio announcers
- Brian Lawrance and his band
- Jack Donohue
- Helen Howard
- Kay Katya and Kay
- The Norwich Trio
- Raymond Newell
- The Music Hall Boys
- Carson Robison and His Pioneers
- The Wiere Brothers

== Reception ==
The Monthly Film Bulletin wrote: "Clapham and Dwyer are entertaining and the turns are pleasing although some might have been shorter. The sets and photography are good."

Kine Weekly wrote: "Conventional screen vaudeville show, presenting a straightforward variety bill. Most of the turns are good, but the presentation suffers from repetition. The first half of the film has the makings of an attractive featurette, but by prolonging the parade – many of the players are permitted to pay a return visit – its welcome is out-stayed. ... The grand finale, which strikes a patriotic note, is effective, but its arrival is belated. To make the show go with a bang repetition must be eliminated, and this should not be difficult."

Picturegoer wrote: "Straightforward variety entertainment, which contains too much repetition and could well be cut with advantage. The turns are quite good, but the presentation is not remarkable."
