= Ann Fairbairn =

American author

Dorothy Tait
- Born: March 1, 1901; Cambridge, Massachusetts
- Died: February 8, 1972 (aged 70); Monterey, California
- Writing career
- Pen name: Ann Fairbairn
- Notable works: Five Smooth Stones; That Man Cartwright

Dorothy Tait (March 1, 1901, Cambridge, Massachusetts – February 8, 1972, Monterey, California), better known by her pen name, Ann Fairbairn, was an American author. She wrote Five Smooth Stones, published in 1966, which was her best-known work. Fairbairn also wrote That Man Cartwright, which was published in 1970.

== Early life and career ==
Tait attended Leland Powers School in Boston. During the 1930s, she worked as a writer for the Works Progress Administration (WPA). During World War II, she worked as a riveter in the San Francisco shipyards. In the 1940s, she moved to Bakersfield, California, where she worked as a newspaper reporter and served as a news editor and continuity director for a local radio station.

She lived in New Orleans for many years and, for two and a half years, lived in Rio de Janeiro. She began work as a feature editor and a newspaper reporter.

While living in New Orleans, Tait managed the American and international tours of jazz clarinetist George Lewis's band for more than a decade. In 1961 her biography, "Call Him George," was published in London by Peter Davies Ltd., under the pen name Jay Allison Stuart. It was published in the United States by Crown Publishers in 1969, crediting authorship to Ann Fairbairn.

Tait's experience with Lewis inspired her to write "Five Smooth Stones."

Tait was highly guarded about details of her personal life. She was widowed twice. The names of her husbands are not known. She had no children.

== Works ==
- Call Him George, 1961
- Five Smooth Stones, 1966
- That Man Cartwright, 1970
