= Tulsa (film) =

1949 American Western film

- Film poster
- Directed by: Stuart Heisler
- Written by: Curtis Kenyon; Frank S. Nugent; Richard Wormser (story)
- Produced by: Walter Wanger; Edward Lasker
- Starring: Susan Hayward; Robert Preston; Pedro Armendáriz
- Narrated by: Chill Wills
- Cinematography: Winton C. Hoch
- Edited by: Terry O. Morse
- Music by: Frank Skinner
- Color process: Technicolor
- Production company: Walter Wanger Productions
- Distributed by: Eagle-Lion films
- Release dates: April 13, 1949 (Tulsa, Oklahoma); May 26, 1949 (United States)
- Running time: 90 minutes
- Country: United States
- Language: English
- Budget: $1,158,035
- Box office: $2,340,336

Tulsa is a 1949 American Western action film directed by Stuart Heisler and starring Susan Hayward and Robert Preston, and featured Lloyd Gough, Chill Wills (as the narrator), and Ed Begley in one of his earliest film roles, billed as Edward Begley.

The film's plot revolves around greed, conservation, and romance. It was nominated for an Oscar for its special effects at the 22nd Academy Awards in 1950. The film is no longer copyright protected, and has entered the public domain in the United States.

== Review ==
The film tells a story about the Tulsa, Oklahoma oil boom of the 1920s and how obsession with accumulating wealth and power can tend to corrupt moral character. The tale begins with the death of rancher Nelse Lansing, who is killed by an oil well blowout while visiting Tanner Petroleum to report that pollution from Tanner's oil production has killed some of his cattle. Lansing's daughter, Cherokee, initially in an effort to punish Tanner for her father's death, acquires drilling rights on her land; she meets Brad Brady, a geologist, who wants drilling to be limited to minimise oil field depletion and preserve the area's grasslands.

Jim Redbird is a native American who has long been drawn to Cherokee and, being persuaded by Brady that cattle men can live and work alongside oil men, buys into her oil business and becomes wealthy. As Cherokee succumbs to power and greed, and becomes a partner of the ruthless Tanner, Jim renounces his holdings. Overcome with anger after a humiliating meeting with Tanner, Cherokee and some of their legal and governmental associates, Jim accidentally starts a fire in a derrick trailing pool. In its aftermath, in recognition of the destruction caused by improper oil drilling, and how money and power can corrupt even those who love the land, the oil drillers and the geologist vow to start over and to ensure conservation is their top priority. The film received its Oscar nomination for the resulting impressive scenes of the rampaging flames.

== Cast ==
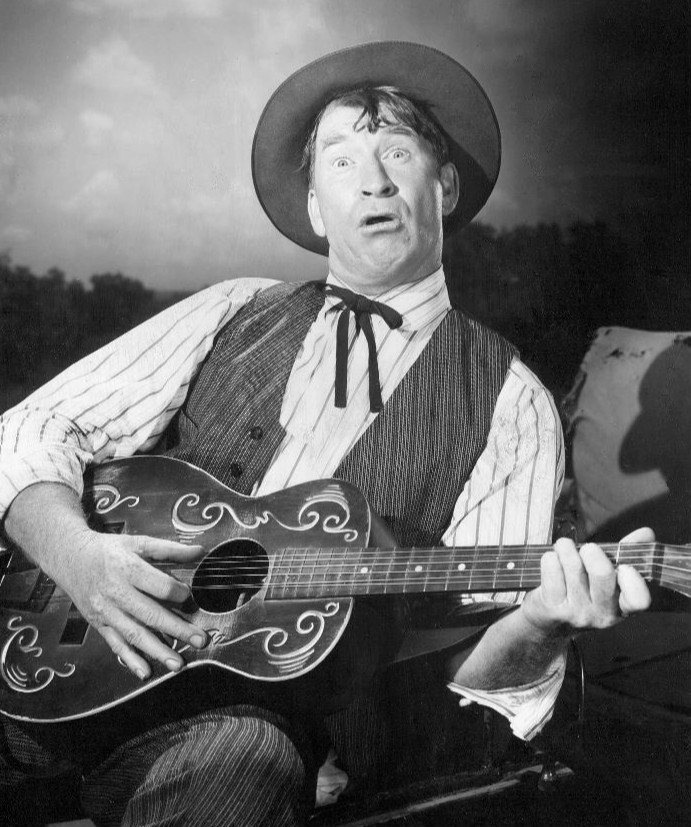
Narrator Chill Wills in Tulsa

- Susan Hayward as Cherokee Lansing
- Robert Preston as Brad Brady
- Pedro Armendáriz as Jim Redbird
- Lloyd Gough as Bruce Tanner
- Chill Wills as Pinky Jimpson (narrator)
- Ed Begley as John J. "Johnny" Brady (as Edward Begley)
- Jimmy Conlin as Homer Triplette
- Lola Albright as Candy Williams
- Roland Jack as Steve, Cherokee's ranch hand
- Bill Hickman as Bill, the Caterpillar tractor driver (uncredited)
- Eula Morgan as Opera singer (uncredited)

== Reception ==
The film earned an estimated $1.6 million in the US. It recorded a loss of $746,099.

== See also ==
- List of films in the public domain in the United States
