= Lee W. Quimby =

American politician (1932–2022)

Member of the New Hampshire House of Representatives from the Carroll 10th district
- In office 2000–2002

Personal details
- Born: Lee Webster Quimby; April 9, 1932 Cambridge, Massachusetts, U.S.
- Died: November 29, 2022 (aged 90) Center Sandwich, New Hampshire, U.S.
- Party: Republican
- Spouse: Jane Haywood
- Education: Leland Powers School; University of Maine

Lee Webster Quimby (April 9, 1932 – November 29, 2022) was an American politician. A member of the Republican Party, he served in the New Hampshire House of Representatives from 2000 to 2002.

== Life and career ==
Quimby was born in Cambridge, Massachusetts, the son of Arthur Quimby, an attorney, and Helen Johnson. He attended and graduated from Leland Powers School. After graduating, he worked as a radio and television sportscaster in numerous broadcasting stations in New York, Massachusetts and Maine. He then attended the University of Maine, graduating summa cum laude.

Quimby served in the New Hampshire House of Representatives from 2000 to 2002.

== Personal life and death ==
Quimby was married to Jane Haywood. Their marriage lasted until Quimby's death in 2022.

Quimby died at his home in Center Sandwich, New Hampshire on November 29, 2022, at the age of 90.
