= The Great American Broadcast =

1941 film by Archie Mayo

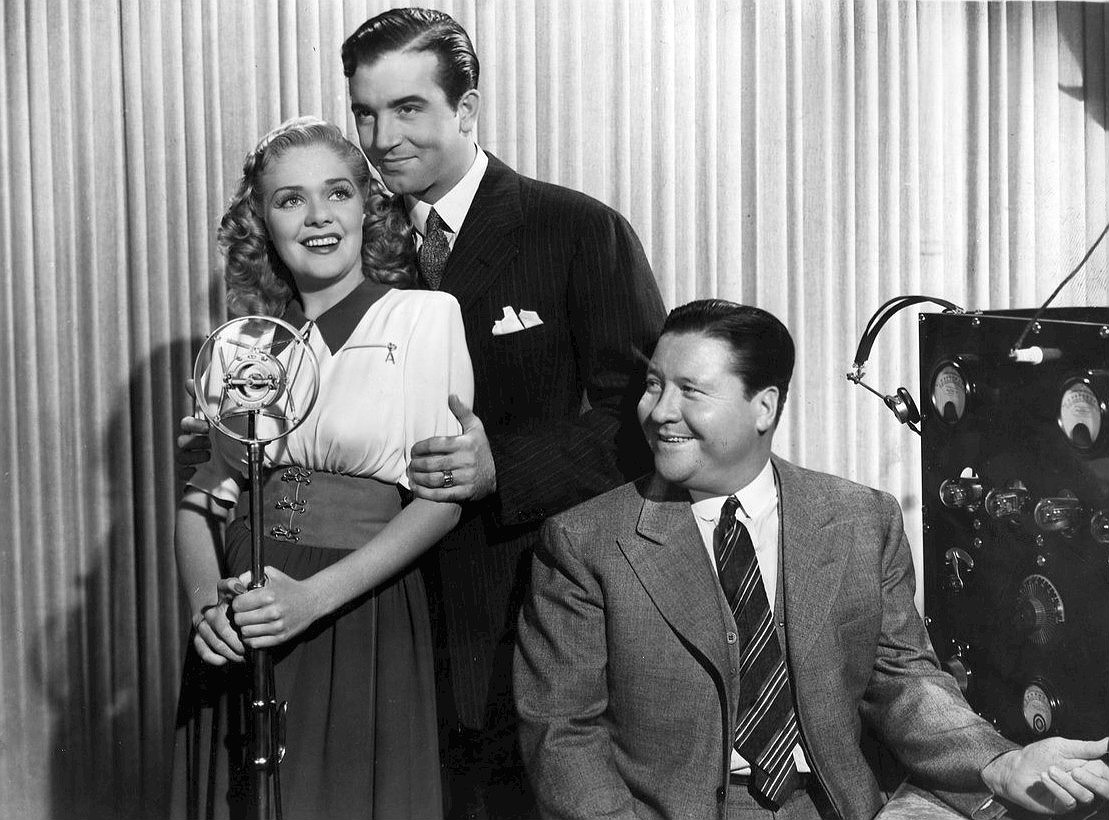
- Alice Faye, John Payne and Jack Oakie
- Directed by: Archie Mayo
- Written by: Don Ettlinger; Erwin Blum; Robert Ellis; Helen Logan; Samuel Hoffenstein
- Produced by: Darryl F. Zanuck
- Starring: Alice Faye; John Payne; Jack Oakie
- Cinematography: J. Peverell Marley; Leon Shamroy
- Edited by: Robert L. Simpson
- Music by: Cyril J. Mockridge
- Production company: 20th Century Fox
- Distributed by: 20th Century Fox
- Release date: May 9, 1941
- Running time: 90 minutes
- Country: United States
- Language: English

The Great American Broadcast is a 1941 American musical comedy film directed by Archie Mayo and starring Jack Oakie, Alice Faye and John Payne. It was produced and distributed by 20th Century Fox.

== Plot ==
Impoverished roommates Rix Martin and Chuck Hadley have dreams of being the first to operate a coast-to-coast radio broadcast. They invest what little profit their small station makes into advanced equipment and finally get their wish when they bootleg the Jack Dempsey—Jess Willard 1919 heavyweight title fight from ringside.

Meanwhile, the station's band singer is surrounded by suitors—Payne, Oakie, and Chadwick, without whose money the station could not operate.

== Cast ==
- Alice Faye as Vicki Adams
- John Payne as Rix Martin
- Jack Oakie as Chuck Hadley
- Cesar Romero as Bruce Chadwick
- James Newill as Great American Broadcast Lead Singer
- The Ink Spots as themselves: Bill Kenny, Deek Watson, Charlie Fuqua, and Orville "Hoppy" Jones
- Bill Kenny as Song Specialty [member of The Ink Spots]
- Orville "Hoppy" Jones as Song Specialty [member of The Ink Spots]
- Charlie Fuqua as Song Specialty [member of The Ink Spots]
- Deek Watson as Song Specialty [member of The Ink Spots]
- The Nicholas Brothers as themselves: [Fayard and Harold Nicholas]
- Fayard Nicholas as Railroad Station Dance Specialty [member of The Nicholas Brothers]
- Harold Nicholas as Railroad Station Dance Specialty [member of The Nicholas Brothers]
- The Wiere Brothers as themselves [Harry Wiere, Herbert Wiere & Sylvester Wiere]
- Harry Wiere as Chapman's Cheerful Chappies & The Stradivarians [member of The Wiere Brothers]
- Herbert Wiere as Chapman's Cheerful Chappies & The Stradivarians [member of The Wiere Brothers]
- Sylvester Wiere as Chapman's Cheerful Chappies & The Stradivarians [member of The Wiere Brothers]
- Mary Beth Hughes as Secretary
- Eula Morgan as Madame Rinaldi
- William Pawley as Foreman
- Lucien Littlefield as Justice of the Peace
- Edward Conrad as Conductor
- Gary Breckner as Announcer
- M.J. Frankovich [billed as Mike Frankovich] as Announcer
- Frank Orth as Counter Man
- Eddie Acuff as Jimmy
- Mildred Gover as Jennie
- Syd Saylor as Brakeman

Cameo appearances by:

- Milton Berle as Radio Announcer [scenes deleted]
- Jack Benny as Self [uncredited appearance in Opening Montage, taken from archive footage]
- Eddie Cantor as Self [uncredited appearance in Opening Montage, taken from archive footage]
- Kate Smith as Self [uncredited appearance in Opening Montage, taken from archive footage]
- Rudy Vallee as Self [uncredited appearance in Opening Montage, taken from archive footage]
- Paul Whiteman as Self [uncredited appearance in Opening Montage, taken from archive footage]
- Walter Winchell as Self [uncredited appearance in Opening Montage, taken from archive footage]

== Bibliography ==
- Fetrow, Alan G. Feature Films, 1940-1949: a United States Filmography. McFarland, 1994.
