= Wendall Woodbury =

American journalist

Wendall J. Woodbury (June 20, 1942 – October 20, 2010) was an American television journalist and news anchor. He spent much of his career as a reporter for WGAL-TV in Lancaster, Pennsylvania, from 1968 until his retirement from broadcast news in 1992 as a feature reporter. He was known for a series of segments called "Wendall's World" while at WGAL. Woodbury was the first television anchor in the United States to report on the Three Mile Island accident as the story broke in 1979.

== Biography ==
=== Early life ===
Woodbury was born in Belfast, Maine, to Blaine and Nellie (née Jackson) Woodbury. He graduated from Crosby High School in Belfast before enrolling in the Leland Powers School of Radio, Television and Theater in Boston, Massachusetts.

=== Career ===
Woodbury began his broadcast career at several Maine television stations. He initially worked at the Maine Hildreth Television Network before becoming an announcer at WAGM-TV in Presque Isle and WABI-TV in Bangor.

Woodbury worked as a reporter, anchor and weatherman at WGAL-TV in Lancaster, Pennsylvania, for twenty-four years from 1968 until 1992. Woodbury was the first television anchor in the United States to report on the Three Mile Island accident as the story broke in 1979.

He was known for a series of feature pieces at WGAL called Wendall's World. Woodbury also co-hosted a television show called Susquehanna People with Mary Haverstick and sometimes hosted a dance show called Dance Party, which was loosely based on American Bandstand. He retired from WGAL in 1992 as a features reporter.

Woodbury owned WJW Video Productions, headquartered in Manheim, Pennsylvania, from 1992 until his death in 2010. He wrote, produced, edited and appeared in national and local television commercials and corporate videos.

== Death ==
Woodbury died from lymphoma at Hospice of Lancaster County in Lancaster, Pennsylvania, on October 20, 2010, aged 68. His funeral was held at the St. Thomas Episcopal Church in Lancaster. Woodbury and his wife of 48 years, Faith (née Lewis), were residents of Penn Township, Pennsylvania, located near Manheim. He was survived by his wife, daughter, grand-daughter, and two brothers.
