= Oh! Those Bells =

- Genre: Sitcom
- Created by: Jules White
- Directed by: Norman Abbott; Jack Arnold; Charles Barton
- Starring: The Wiere Brothers
- Country of origin: United States
- Original language: English
- No. of seasons: 1
- No. of episodes: 13

Production
- Producers: Jules White; Sam White; Ben Brady
- Camera setup: Single camera
- Running time: 30 minutes
- Production company: Davanna Productions

Original release
- Network: CBS
- Release: March 8 – May 31, 1962

Counterclockwise from left: Sylvester, Herbert, and Harry Wiere and Carol Byron in a promotional photo for Oh! Those Bells.

Oh! Those Bells is a 1962 United States sitcom television series starring The Wiere Brothers about the misadventures of three brothers who work in a Hollywood theatrical supply shop. It aired from March 8 to May 31, 1962.

== Cast ==
- Herbert Wiere as Herbie Bell
- Harry Wiere as Harry Bell
- Sylvester Wiere as Sylvester "Sylvie" Bell
- Henry Norell as Henry Slocum
- Carol Byron as Kitty Mathews
- Reta Shaw as Mrs. Stanfield

== Synopsis ==
Herbie, Harry, and Sylvester "Sylvie" Bell are three gentle-natured brothers who are the last surviving members of a family with a long history of making theatrical props, costumes, and wigs. Having moved from Germany to California to start new lives, they work in a Hollywood theater supply shop called Cinema Rents, located on Ridgeway Drive, where their irascible and easily flustered boss is Henry Slocum. Although they mean well, they manage to turn even the simplest everyday tasks into slapstick disasters. Slocum's secretary, Kitty Mathews, is sweet, understanding, and beautiful, and Sylvie has a crush on her. The Bells live together in a bungalow, where Mrs. Stanfield is their landlady.

== Production ==
A loosely structured show, Oh! Those Bells attempted to bring slapstick humor to American television. At the time, The Wiere Brothers – German-Austrian-born Herbert, Harry, and Sylvester Wiere – were internationally known slapstick comedians. Each episode allowed the Wiere Brothers to perform their old vaudeville act, including their comical musical numbers.

Jules White, known for his short-subject comedies starring The Three Stooges, created the show. He and Sam White produced the pilot episode, known both as "Money Mixup" and "Movie Money." Ben Brady produced the rest of the episodes.

The show's episodes were filmed in 1960, and CBS originally planned to air them during the 1960–1961 season. However, CBS decided to pull the show from the 1960–1961 schedule and instead ran it as a spring replacement series for The New Bob Cummings Show in 1962.

== Reception ==
In a review of the premiere episode of Oh! Those Bells published in the Daily Freeman of Kingston, New York, on March 9, 1962, Cynthia Lowry said that The New Bob Cummings Show had been a disappointment, but that its replacement, Oh! Those Bells, made The New Bob Cummings Show look like a "blue-white, glass-cutting gem of comedy." She wrote that "From the opening moment when the stuffed head of the moose caught one Wiere by the seat of the pants to the hilarious climax when the boss was accidentally hit on the head by a golf club, it was one long maladroit bore," adding that Oh! Those Bells "may achieve the distinction of the year′s worst [television series] and certainly the one with the loudest laugh track."

== Broadcast history ==
The last episode of The New Bob Cummings Show aired on March 1, 1962, and Oh! Those Bells premiered on CBS as its replacement on March 8, 1962. It was cancelled after the broadcast of its thirteenth episode on May 31, 1962. It aired on Thursday at 7:30 p.m. throughout its run.

== Episodes ==
No.	Title	Original release date
1	"Forget Me Nuts"	March 8, 1962
The Bells go to a missile factory to pick up an old rocket for use as a movie prop, and trouble ensues.
2	"Unfriendly Friendship Club"	March 15, 1962
After Mrs. Stansfield orders them out of their bungalow, the Bells try to get back in her good graces by giving her a membership in a friendship club.
3	"Murder in the Jungle"	March 22, 1962
The Bells must take care of a chimpanzee and discover that he can write — or so they think.
4	"Money Mix-Up" "Movie Money"	March 29, 1962
The Bells get stage money meant for use in a movie mixed up with counterfeit money produced by criminals, and end up involved with both the counterfeiters and the police. This was the pilot for Oh! Those Bells.
5	"Seal of Approval"	April 5, 1962
After Mr. Slocum learns that the Bells have come into an inheritance from their uncle, he wants to make them partners in the theater supply shop. The inheritance turns out to be a trained seal—but after practically destroying Slocum's business, the Bells find a check for $10,000 around the seal's neck.
6	"Too Many Spooks"	April 12, 1962
After Mrs. Stanfield evicts the Bells from their bungalow for being behind on their rent, they move into a house reputed to be haunted. The Bells spend a wild night in the house, dealing with moving walls, secret compartments, moving bedroom doors, and beds that move between rooms.
7	"Monkey Sitters"	April 19, 1962
Mr. Slocum has to keep a chimpanzee but has no permit for it, so the Bells try to hide the animal in their bungalow — and must match wits with both a snooping Mrs. Stansfield and an amateur detective to keep them from discovering the chimpanzee.
8	"The Wallet"	April 26, 1962
While trying to return a wallet to a customer who dropped it in their shop, the Bells encounter a gang of thieves in a waterfront hangout.
9	"Ma Scarlet"	May 3, 1962
The only woman on the list of the ten most wanted criminals convinces the Bells that she is only a mild-mannered newspaper vendor, so they fix up a place for her to stay in a warehouse — and she decides to take advantage of their friendliness. Ellen Corby guest-stars.
10	"Short Change"	May 10, 1962
Kitty is upset because her family cannot afford to keep her brother in medical school, so the Bells decide to borrow the money necessary to pay for his education — and trouble ensues when the lender wants his money back. Jesse White, Murvyn Vye, and Teddy Hart guest-star.
11	"Mexican Holiday"	May 17, 1962
The Bells become involved in an international conspiracy to smuggle diamonds into the United States.
12	"Scratched Fender"	May 24, 1962
While delivering a rush order, the Bells scrape the fender of a parked car, then find it impossible to discover who the car's owner is.
13	"Camping Trip"	May 31, 1962
The Bells frustrate Mr. Slocum when they accidentally take a piece of paper with an important telephone number written on it with them when they go on a camping trip.
