= Five Smooth Stones =

American novel by Ann Fairbairn published in 1966

- Cover of 2009 Chicago Review Press edition
- Author: Ann Fairbairn
- Language: English
- Genre: Drama
- Set in: New Orleans, 1960s
- Publisher: Crown, Bantam, Chicago Review Press
- Publication date: 1966
- Publication place: United States
- Media type: Print
- ISBN: 9780517506875

Five Smooth Stones is a 1966 novel by Ann Fairbairn, set in the era of the American civil rights movement.

The novel's African-American protagonist, David Champlain, was born into the poverty and Jim Crow justice of Depression-era New Orleans. His Great grandfather was lynched by a white mob and he was raised by his grandparents. David himself is brilliant and lucky and is graduated from a Midwestern college, then Harvard Law School, then Oxford. David and a white woman, Sara Kent, fall in love, but David fears for their future as a mixed-race couple in America. David chooses to practice international law and serve abroad as a diplomat. But the death – perhaps murder – of his grandfather brings David back to New Orleans, where he is plunged into the turmoil of the Civil Rights Movement and takes a leadership role. Tragedy ensues.

Fairbairn's experience managing the national and international tours of jazz clarinetist George Lewis provided the background and impetus for writing this, her first novel.

The book title comes from the biblical story of David and Goliath; chapter 17 verse 40 of the First Book of Samuel says: "Then he [David] took his staff in his hand, chose five smooth stones from the stream, put them in the pouch of his shepherd's bag and, with his sling in his hand, approached the Philistine [Goliath]."

Five Smooth Stones, of epic length (more than 900 pages), was a Literary Guild selection in 1967. Kirkus Reviews describes the novel as "readable" but decries "its utter predictability" and opines that "the characters are unrememberable; as writing, it is unremarkable", but nevertheless "it dramatizes and empathizes the experience of a minority in a way which will reach the majority". Wilma Dykeman, in The New York Times Book Review, described it as "richly realized" and "refreshing".

== Editions ==
- Fairbairn, Ann (1966). Five Smooth Stones. New York: Crown. ISBN 9780517506875.
- Fairbairn, Ann (1977). Five Smooth Stones. Bantam. ISBN 9780553107692.
- Fairbairn, Ann (2009). Five Smooth Stones. Rediscovered Classics. Chicago: Chicago Review Press. ISBN 9781556528156.
