= Eula Morgan =

American actress (1931–1953)

- Morgan, c. 1941
- Born: Eula Moulder Morgan; September 29, 1893; Linn Creek, Missouri, US
- Died: November 5, 1982 (aged 89); Riverside, California, US
- Occupations: Actress; opera singer
- Years active: 1931–1953

Eula Moulder Morgan was an American opera singer and actress in films and theater from the 1930s through the 1950s. A professional pianist during her childhood, she practiced studying opera as a career in her adult years, performing in theatres across multiple states. Her first film role was in The Great American Broadcast in 1941 and she would have a number of appearances in films in the decade after, prominently in roles that featured her singing operatic solos.

== Career ==
Born in Linn Creek, Missouri to Mr. and Mrs. Joseph H. Moulder, Morgan was performing piano by the age of 15 in professional orchestras in Montana and Oklahoma. She also played piano as accompaniment for silent films at the Empress Theatre in Sapulpa, Oklahoma and the Majestic Theatre with Tom Herrick.

After winning two voice study contests, she was allowed to perform in July 1927 at the Chicago Kimball Hall as a part of the Oscar Saenger Opera Class and did voice work with Percy Rector Stephens. She then went on to study singing at schools in Chicago and New York before performing in grand operas in Tulsa, Oklahoma and Oklahoma City. Alongside her performances, Morgan taught as a voice teacher in Tulsa. After marrying, the couple moved to St. Louis, where Morgan continued performing at the local Little Theatre and had performances with the Light Opera Guild and the Town Square Summer Stock.

During the summer of 1940, she played a bit part at the Town Square Theatre in the play Pastoral. Applying for a position in Willard Holland's theatre performances for the winter of 1940 at the Pasadena Playhouse, she used the opportunity being so close to Los Angeles to apply for acting openings. Morgan obtained an interview with Lynden Behymer and, while he didn't have any singing roles in musicals being worked on, he was able to get her a role in a local play. Soon after, Behymer was contacted by Twentieth Century Fox looking for an actress who could sing opera, which resulted in him recommending Morgan for the role. She signed a film contract with Fox at the end of 1940 for a role in The Great American Broadcast as Madame Rinaldi. During her scene in the film, she performed the sextet Chi mi frena in tal momento from Donizetti's Lucia di Lammermoor. Her performance was described as "impressive" by The St. Louis Star and Times, especially for a first time film role, and showcased her capability coming from being in theatre, with her particular voice and acting being "satisfactorily recorded".

After her successful initial showing and ongoing roles in other films, Morgan moved to Hollywood from St. Louis. In the 1948 theatre production of Black John as Goldie, the Hollywood Citizen-News said Morgan "roars lustily through her role as the pursuing wife", though had more "vigor than accuracy" when it came to replicating a New England accent. The New York Daily News described her acting and role as "one of the toughest wimmin ever seen in these here parts".

== Personal life ==
She was married to Fred Morgan and together they had a son.

== Theater ==
- The Guardsman (1931)
- The Queen Was in the Parlour
- Star Spangled (1936)
- Wunderkind (1936)
- Caesar and Cleopatra
- The Merry Widow as Madame Nova Kovich
- Aida as Aida
- Madama Butterfly
- Cavalleria rusticana
- Morning's at Seven (1939)
- Pastoral (1940)
- Sweethearts (1941)
- Old English (1943) as Adela Heythorpe
- Snafu (1945)
- Black John (1948) as Goldie
- A Christmas Carol (1949) (Radio play)

== Filmography ==
- The Great American Broadcast (1941) as Madame Rinaldi
- Lady for a Night (1942) as Dowager
- Secrets of the Underground (1942) as Mrs. Calhoun
- Mrs. Miniver (1942) as Glee club member
- Tonight We Raid Calais (1943) as Daughter
- The Song of Bernadette (1943) as Madame Nicoleau
- Reckless Age (1944) as Guard
- Wilson (1944) as Singer
- An Angel Comes to Brooklyn (1945) as Olga Ashley
- Leave It to Blondie (1945) as Laura Meredith
- Night in Paradise (1946) as Townswoman
- Gallant Journey (1946) as Mrs. Logan
- Mother Wore Tights (1947) as Opera singer
- Monsieur Verdoux (1947) as Phoebe Couvais
- The Trouble with Women (1947) as Mrs. Pooler
- The Iron Curtain (1948)
- The Loves of Carmen (1948) as Woman in crown
- The Snake Pit (1948) as Attendant
- Oh, You Beautiful Doll (1949) as Madame Zaubel
- Tulsa as Opera Singer (1949)
- Madame Bovary (1949)
- Key to the City (1950) as Police matron
- Jim Thorpe – All-American (1951) as Charlotte Thorpe
- Mask of the Avenger (1951)
- Hiawatha (1952) as Mother of Chibiabos

=== TV series ===
- Death Valley Days – "The Chivaree" as Rocky (January 7, 1953)
- The Range Rider – "Gold Hill" as Tillie Jenkins (1952)
- The Lone Ranger – "Troubled Waters" as Emmy Bryson (March 9, 1950)
