= Mary Freeman Byrne =

Mary Freeman Byrne (née Keith) (4 October 1886 – 18 January 1961) was an American author who sometimes wrote under the pen name Marie Byrne.

Byrne was born in Brockton, Massachusetts, and trained for the stage at the Leland Powers Theatrical School in Boston. She appeared in plays with such actors of the day as Joan Davis and Donald Meek.

She gave up acting and settled in England after marrying Ferdinand Byrne, who had a medical practise in London.

Byrne wrote short stories for American and British magazines, including Modern Weekly, Charm, and Home Weekly. Byrne published her novel Softly Softly in 1958, under the pen name Marie Byrne.

Byrne died at coastal Old House Farm, West Itchenor, West Sussex England in 1961 whereas her main home was declared to be 3 Watford Home, Northwood, Middlesex. Her estate was publicly sworn at £16,673 (equivalent to £469,000 in 2023). Her executors were Natalie W V Wolff, Phyllis R Doyle, and Miles Austin Byrne, an actor-relative.
