= Carol Byron =

American former actress, model, and businesswoman (born 1937)

Carol Byron (born June 24, 1937) is an American former actress, model, and businesswoman.

== Early years ==
Byron, the daughter of Mr. and Mrs. W. R. Byron, was born on June 24, 1937, in Los Angeles. She grew up on a farm in Escondido, where her chores included milking two goats each morning before she went to school. She, her brother, and her parents moved to San Marcos in November 1947. She attended the Rich-Mar School and was a student at Escondido Union High School for two years. After graduating from Pasadena High School in 1955, she majored in music at Pasadena City College. A professor recommended that Byron look for work in television commercials, so she went to Hollywood to pursue that objective. (Another source says that a scout for the John Powers School of Modeling noticed her, which led to her working in commercials.)

=== Festival controversy ===
In 1954 Byron withdrew from being a princess in the Wistaria Court of the annual Wistaria Festival in Sierra Madre, California. Some initial reports said that personal reasons led to the withdrawal, while others attributed the action to the pressure of the competition to become queen of the festival. More detailed reports indicated a disagreement between Byron and William Adrian, a judge in the contest who owned a modeling agency in Pasadena. Byron said that beginning on the day she tried out for the contest Adrian indicated that if she would enroll in his modeling school she would become the queen of the contest and go on to be featured on magazine covers and win other contests. Byron's father said that Adrian also spoke to him, and he told Adrian to forget it. Byron said that Adrian contacted her nearly every day from her initial competition until she resigned, asking her to enroll in his school for a fee of $200. Adrian denied the accusations, saying that he did not pick the queen, although he was involved in selection of the five princesses. "It was all a terrible misunderstanding", he said. The festival's publicity director also said that Adrian was not involved in determining the queen, adding that a group of commercial photographers made that decision. The controversy was "the first hint of scandal" in the festival's history.

== Career ==
=== Entertainment ===
Byron said that she "started out as a coloratura soprano, but didn't have enough volume". She began working as a fashion model in 1957, and making commercials soon followed. For three years she poured coffee, washed dishes, waxed floors, and did other actions related to sponsors' products on television. Many of her commercials on radio included her singing the product's jingle. While she was working as a model she was selected as one of 13 women in Hollywood (out of 311 who were originally considered) who were destined for stardom. Producers and makeup artists in Hollywood named her Deb Star of the Year, "an honor given to those deemed headed for stardom".

Byron was the hostess on the television version of Dr. I.Q. in the late 1950s. In 1962 she had roles on two network series. She portrayed Peggy Evans, a wife and mother in Window on Main Street and Kitty Mathews, the Wiere Brothers' secretary on Oh! Those Bells (a show that had been filmed almost two years before it was broadcast). After those two series ended, Byron wanted more acting roles. She acknowledged that her income would be greater if she worked exclusively in commercials, but she desired the status that accompanied working in series. "It's the snob in me that makes me seek out dramatic roles," she said.

In 1963, Bryon was one of the Art Linkletter Players, actors who tried to fool unaware people while cameras captured the individuals' reactions to situations, on The Art Linkletter Show on NBC-TV. Other network TV programs on which she appeared included Playhouse 90, Peter Gunn, Father of the Bride, Rawhide, Perry Mason, Wagon Train, The Adventures of Ozzie and Harriet, Mister Ed, and The Many Loves of Dobie Gillis.

Films in which Byron was featured included The Big Beat, Senior Prom, Ask Any Girl, and Where the Boys Are. She performed on stage in 1966 in a production of Take Her, She's Mine at the Valley Music Theater. A newspaper review said, "Carol Byron is beautiful, fresh and vital as the daughter, and projects Mollie's many facets with a good deal of flair."

In the mid-1970s Byron was co-host of the Breakfast Club Show on radio station KCHV, and she had a syndicated radio program, Woman's View. She returned to acting in October 1977, portraying secretary Maggie Cutler in the College of the Desert's production of The Man Who Came to Dinner. She had The Carol Byron Show on KABL-TV in 1978, and in 1979 she hosted the talk show 30 Minutes with Carol Byron on KESQ-TV.

=== Other activities ===
Byron is an artist who works in custom design of canvasses, knitting, needlepoint, and rug hooking. In the mid-1970s she owned and operated the Lady Byron Needlepoint and Rug Hooking Shop in Palm Desert, California. In 1980 she became executive director of the Los Angeles office of Group Innovations Limited, National Speakers Bureau of America; in 1981 she opened an branch of the organization in Palm Desert while keeping her Los Angeles office. Her clients included Mike Douglas, Betty Ford, Gerald Ford, Ava Gabor, and Bob Newhart. Byron provided speakers for events that included annual conventions, corporate conferences, dinner parties, and sales seminars. In the early 1980s she co-founded the Pegasus Riding Academy for handicapped people.

== Personal life ==
Byron is "an accomplished sculptor and painter". When she worked in TV series she used those activities to relieve stress that built up during a hard day on the set. In 1982 she married Frank Goodman, a builder, developer, and real estate broker, in Palm Desert.
