= The Betty White Show (1958 TV series) =

American variety TV series (1958)

The Betty White Show is an American variety television program that was broadcast on ABC February 5, 1958 - April 30, 1958.

== Background ==
After ABC canceled Betty White's program Date with the Angels, it announced that White would star in The Betty White Show, a live comedy-variety series that would include well-known guest stars. The new program filled the time slot of Angels. The show's live status was counter to that era's trend of more TV shows being presented on film. The New York Times wrote that the decision to go live was made by the sponsor, Plymouth, and the producer, Don Fedderson. White said that she liked the live format because "It gives me a chance to play to my audience instead of a camera." She felt that use of film was acceptable for situation comedies, but said that live broadcasts provided "an air of spontaneity" that was needed for variety shows to be effective.

== Overview ==
A typical episode of The Betty White Show consisted of three skits in which White played various roles, joined by the show's regulars and the episode's guest stars. Regulars on the program included Del Moore, Frank Nelson, John Dehner, Johnny Jacobs, Peter Leeds, and Reta Shaw. Frank De Vol's orchestra provided music. Tom Kennedy was the announcer. Cornel Wilde and Charles Coburn were the guest stars on the premiere episode. Other guest stars included Billy De Wolfe, Boris Karloff and Buster Keaton.

== Production ==
The Betty White Show was broadcast on Wednesdays from 9:30 to 10 p.m. Eastern Time. The high-budgeted show was performed in a studio with seating for approximately 100 people. The program originated from Los Angeles. James V. Kern was the director; Seaman Jacobs, Si Ross, and George Tibbles were the writers.

== Critical response ==
A brief review of the premiere episode in The Oregonian found the final skit to be "pretty funny ... a marked improvement on Date with the Angels".

A review in the trade publication Broadcasting said that the live-sketch format suited White well. It said that she was funny when portraying various characters in sketches, but "she's even more fun when she reverts to Betty White, that true child of the medium and one who is on excellent terms with the camera". That point was reinforced by the comment that White's production-number songs were the best parts of the episode being reviewed.
