= Leland Powers School =

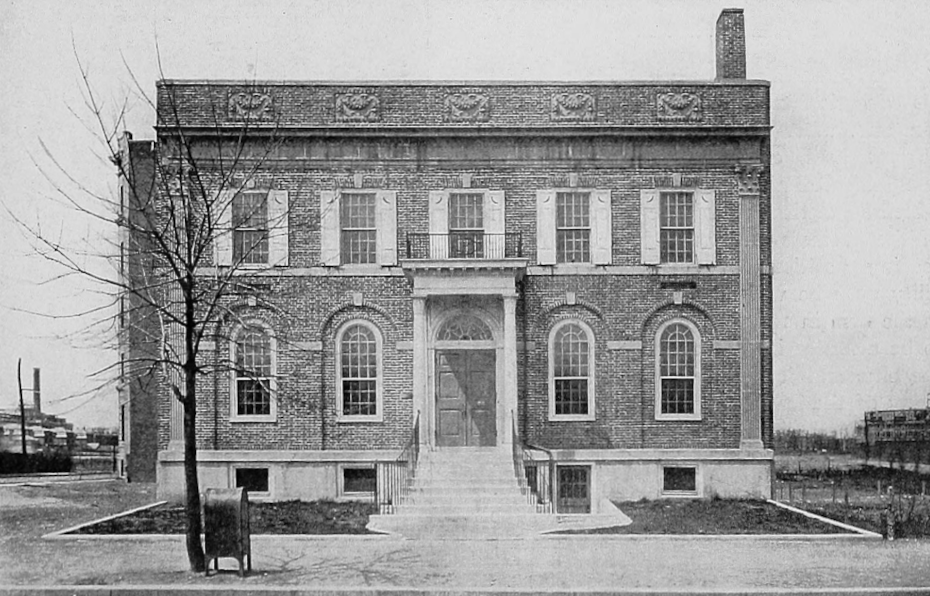
- c. 1916
- Former name: School of Elocution (1879-1943)
- Type: Private
- Active: 1904–1979
- President: Leland Powers
- Location: Boston, Massachusetts, United States; 42.3378°N 71.0992°W

The Leland Powers School, also known as the Leland Powers School of Communication, Leland Powers School of Radio, Theatre, and Television, Leland Powers Theatre School, the Leland Powers School of Expression, Leland Powers School of the Spoken Word, and originally called the Leland Powers School of Elocution, was originally located on Massachusetts Avenue in the South End. A purpose-built building on Evans Way, behind the Museum of Fine Arts was constructed in 1914. This building was taken by eminent domain in the 1970s. The school moved three more times - 2001 Beacon Street, Cleveland Circle, 10 Charlesgate East in the Back Bay, and 70 Brookline Avenue, adjacent Fenway Park before it closed in 1979. Speaker and author Leland Powers founded the school in 1904. The school educated several notable speakers and authors of the early 20th century, including drama educator T. Earl Pardoe, actress Reta Shaw, and journalist Wendall Woodbury.

== History ==
Leland T. Powers founded the school after teaching with the Redpath Lyceum Bureau, a Chautauqua circuit business. While working for the bureau, Powers was assigned as a reader during chautauquas, and as a coach to other readers. Powers also edited scripts for usage, focusing on readability and performance. During this time Powers was an associate of Carl Sandburg.

In 1904, Powers' school cost $200 for a semester's tuition. Joining his wife and more than a dozen staff members in teaching 140 students annually.

The School was credited with being on the leading edge of technology when in 1944 it started broadcasting a show called The Great American Home on local station WIXG.

Leland Powers School closed on April 27, 1979, due to financial problems.

== Graduates ==
- Annette Carell, actress
- Fay Davis, actress
- Jeff Donnell, actress
- Mary Freeman Byrne, author
- Rod Fritz, newscaster, Boston (WBZ and WRKO) and New York (Fox) (as per this excerpt from the WRKO article)
- Ernest Holmes, religious leader
- Don Gillis, sportscaster
- Neil MacNevin (Tom Evans), radio/tv announcer (see Creature Double Feature)
- J T Nichols, playwright (Porktown, Taming the Savages, Jesus & the Pirates, etc.)
- Palmer Payne, newscaster, NYC at WCBS (880 AM))
- Lee W. Quimby, politician
- Glynn Ross, opera impresario
- Bob Wilson, sportscaster
