= Clapham and Dwyer =

British comedy duo

Cigarette card of Clapham and Dwyer from 1935

Clapham and Dwyer were a British comedy duo popular in the 1920s and 1930s, comprising Charlie Clapham (William Charles Conrad Clapham; 6 January 1894–27 July 1959) and Bill Dwyer (William Henry Dwyer; 7 May 1887–11 January 1943).

== Lives and careers ==
Charlie Clapham, born in Birmingham, was a barrister's clerk working in London, and amateur performer, who turned professional in 1919 after serving in the First World War. He met London-born Bill Dwyer, who was a commercial traveller and semi-professional entertainer from a show business family, and they began working together at garden parties in 1925. An early engagement was a performance in front of the Duke and Duchess of York. After auditioning the following year, and having to improvise nonsense as they had not brought any songs to sing, they made their first broadcast on BBC radio.

They were the first comedy double act to become famous on British radio, and continued to broadcast regularly through the 1920s and 1930s. Dwyer was the straight man, and Clapham - with monocle and moustache - was the fool. Their sketches often featured "Cissie the Cow", a disruptive influence that was initially imaginary but was later played onstage in the manner of a pantomime horse. As a stage act from 1928, they appeared in venues all over the country. In February 1929, they appeared in two early short films made in the Lee de Forest Phonofilm sound-on-film process.

As part of their act in 1929, they originated the Cockney Alphabet, a humorous alphabet that replaces the letters of the alphabet with supposed "Cockney" phonetics, such as "A for ‘Orses" (Hay for Horses) and ending with "Z for Effect" (Said for Effect). They recorded the routine, as "A Surrealist Alphabet", in 1936.

In 1935, they were banned by BBC radio for several months for allegedly broadcasting an improper joke. It is said that, during a live broadcast, when they discovered that a page of their script was missing they ad-libbed: "What’s the difference between a champagne cork and a baby?” asked Clapham. When Dwyer replied that he didn’t know Clapham retorted: “A champagne cork has the name of the maker on it." In 1946, the chairman of the Board of Governors of the BBC, Lord Inman, objected to one of their broadcast jokes – "When I got into my hotel bedroom last night, I found a lady's nightdress on the bed, and I rang the bell." "What for - to ask them to take it away?" "No - to ask them to fill it." As a result, the BBC established its Green Book, setting out the subjects, words, phrases and songs that should not be broadcast.

Clapham and Dwyer appeared in several films in the 1930s, including the early Will Hay film Radio Parade of 1935. The plotline of the 1937 musical revue film Sing As You Swing uses their being banned from the "BVD" broadcasting organisation as a running gag.

Dwyer retired due to illness in 1940, and died in Uppingham, Rutland, in 1943, aged 55. Clapham continued as a solo performer until 1954, and died in St Leonards-on-Sea, Sussex, in 1959, aged 65.
