= Leland T. Powers =

Leland Todd Powers
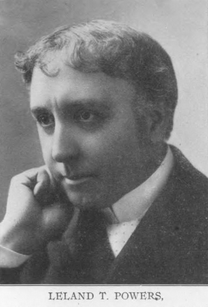
- Born: January 28, 1857; Pultneyville, New York, United States
- Died: November 27, 1920 (aged 63); Brookline, Massachusetts
- Occupation: Educator
- Known for: Founder of the Leland Powers School
- Spouse: Carol Hoyt (m. 1895)

Leland Todd Powers (January 28, 1857 – November 27, 1920) was an American performing arts educator, author, and actor. The founder of the Leland Powers School, he was once renowned as "the highest paid man in the Lyceum field."

== Biography ==
Born in Pultneyville, New York, Powers attended the Phillips Academy in Andover, Massachusetts and graduated there in 1875. In 1884, Powers gained popularity for acting all the roles in plays on his own, and was noted for being "the first man on the Lyceum platform in America to do this." In 1888, he married his first wife Louise Nancy Baldwin. They were divorced in 1895 and she travelled to Europe to have lessons with Alberto Randegger, to whom she was married in 1897. He eventually traveled across the country and to South America, and was noted as being the best paid performer on the Lyceum circuit in America between 1890 and 1900, during which time he was managed by the Redpath Lyceum Bureau. In 1895, he married Carol Hoyt Powers, and they had two children. The family were Christian Scientists, with Carol Hoyt Powers serving a three-year term as Second Reader of The Mother Church in Boston.

In 1893, it was written that, "Leland Powers is small and active, and tropical in temperament, and he dare enact a play with great fidelity."

He married Carol Hoyt on Christmas Eve, December 24, 1895 in Somerville, Massachusetts.

=== Leland Powers School ===
In 1904, he founded the Leland Powers School of the Spoken Word in Boston, Massachusetts, joining his wife and more than a dozen staff members in teaching 140 students annually. Ten years later, in 1914, Powers had a building constructed in the Fenway next door to the Girls' Latin School. From the school Powers sold several books, including Talks on Expression, Fundamentals of Expression (with Mrs. Powers), and a practice book for learners.

Powers' pedagogy was credited as "offering a more holistic answer to the actor's problems," similar to his contemporary, Charles Wesley Emerson.
