= Nephi Jensen =

American judge (1876–1955)

Nephi United States Centennial Jensen (1876–1955), was a member of the Utah House of Representatives, a county judge in Salt Lake City for many years, and was the first president of the Canadian Mission of the Church of Jesus Christ of Latter-day Saints (LDS Church).

Jensen was born in Salt Lake City, Utah Territory, to Danish immigrants. He studied at what is now LDS Business College and was a school teacher. He was a Mormon missionary in the Southern States Mission, mainly in Florida, from 1898 until 1900. He later studied at the University of Utah and received a law degree from the University of Chattanooga. He also served as Mission Secretary for the Southern States Mission while studying law. In 1919 he oversaw the creation of the Canadian Mission based in Toronto.

Jensen served one term as a member of the Utah House of Representatives, in the 7th Utah State Legislature (1907-1909). From 1911 to 1913 he was assistant Salt Lake County Attorney. He then went into private practice with C. E. Marks until leaving to head the Canadian Mission in 1919. From 1928 until 1933, he was a district judge in Salt Lake County.

Jensen published many LDS tracts, as well as writing multiple manuals used in LDS priesthood meeting lessons, and several articles for the Improvement Era.

== Works ==
- Jensen, Nephi (c. 1936), The test of truth: correspondence between Judge Nephi Jensen and a Catholic scholar of Utah, [Place of publication not identified]: [publisher not identified], ISBN 9780835906432, OCLC 2938936
- Fisher, Margaret May Merrill; Lund, C. N.; Jensen, Nephi; Grand Army of the Republic. J.Q. Knowlton Post No. 8. (1929), Utah And The Civil War; Being the Story of the Part Played by the People of Utah in That Great Conflict with special reference to the Lot Smith Expedition and the Robert T. Burton Expedition, Salt Lake City: Deseret Book, ASIN B000NL8062, OCLC 3043004
