= Barbara Retz =

Early member of The Church of Jesus Christ of Latter-day Saints in Dublin

- Barbara Böger
- Born: c.1885 Stuttgart
- Died: 25 May 1948; New York City
- Other name: Barbara Baker

Barbara Retz (c.1885 – 25 May 1948), was an early member of the Church of Jesus Christ of Latter-day Saints in Dublin as well as one of the women arrested in the Easter Rising in Dublin 1916. She was also arrested by the Nazis.

== Life and family ==
Born about 1885 in Stuttgart as Barbara "Babette" Böger, daughter of forester John Böger. Her family moved to Dublin where the family changed their name to Baker. They were Lutheran with an interest in the Latter-day Saint movement. They were baptised into The Church of Jesus Christ of Latter-day Saints by missionaries sent from England and established a local branch. She married fellow German George Retz in 1904 with whom she had 2 children. Retz and her husband did not become British citizens when her brothers got theirs in 1908. As a result, at the start of World War I in 1914 George Retz was interned in the Isle of Man until 1919. Retz ran butcher shops, one on the South Circular Road and one in Rathmines. There had been an incident at one of the properties where a mob attacked the shop at the start of the war. The shops get a mention by James Joyce in Ulysses.

== Activism ==
There are few references to how Retz was connected to the Easter Rising but she may have been friends with Padraig Pearse. She was arrested and imprisoned with the other women in Richmond Barracks in 1916 and released at the same time on 8 May. She remained involved during the Irish War of Independence by arranging safe houses and medical treatment for the people on the run.

Retz returned to Germany occasionally and in 1938 she was arrested for her part in an anti-Nazi rally in Berlin. Thanks to the intervention of the British embassy she was released after 14 days.

She died in New York during May 1948 on her way to visit those family members who had emigrated to the United States. She is buried with family in California.
