= Wiere Brothers =

Comedy trio

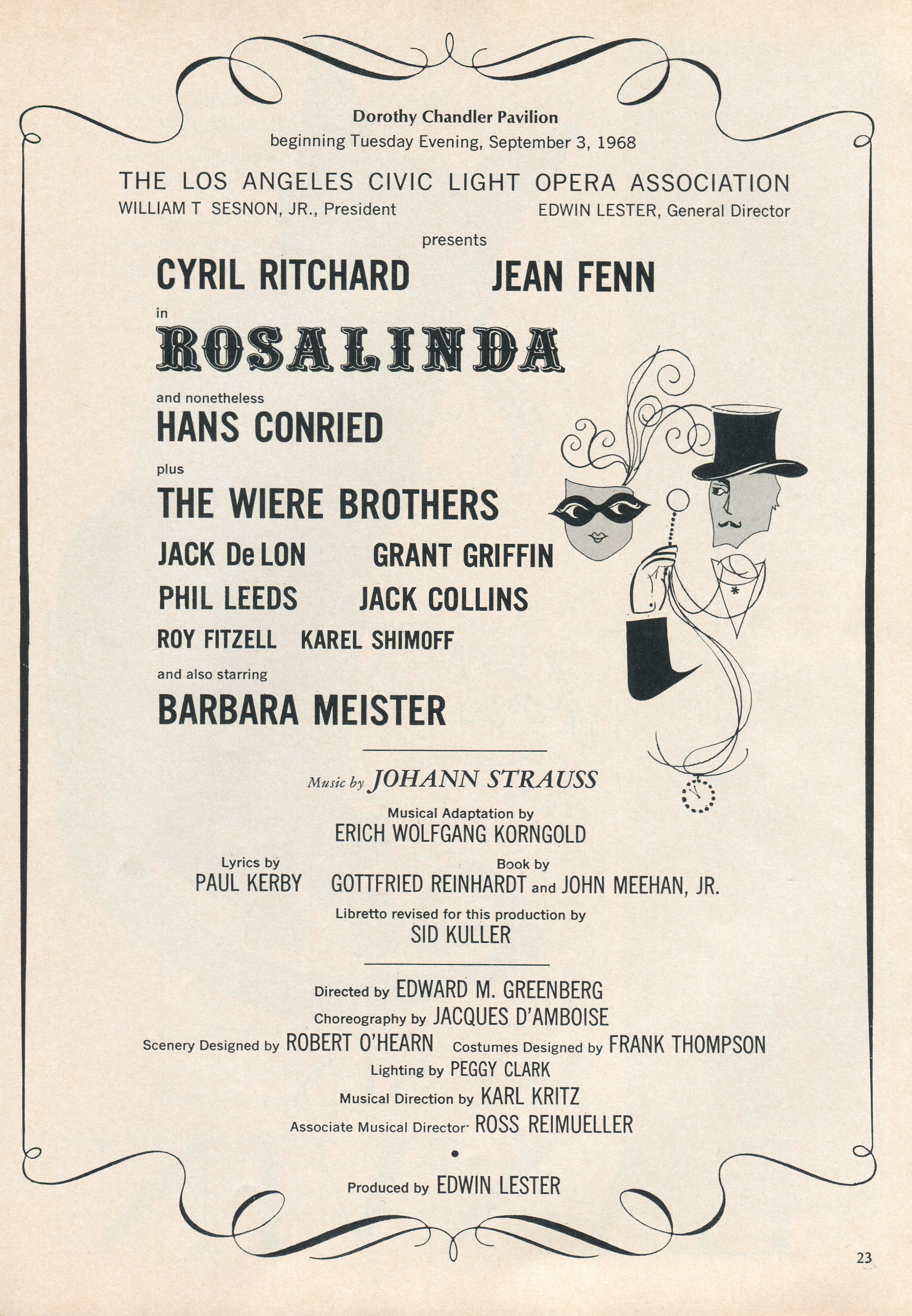
The Wiere Brothers appeared as Frish, Frosh, and Frush in Rosalinda, Los Angeles Civic Light Opera, 1968-69.

Harry Wiere (23 June 1906 in Berlin, German Empire – 15 January 1992), Herbert Wiere (27 February 1908 in Vienna, Austria-Hungary – 5 August 1999), and Sylvester Wiere (17 September 1909 in Prague, Austria-Hungary – 7 July 1970), known collectively as the Wiere Brothers or the Three Wiere Brothers, were a comedy team who appeared in 1930s and 1940s films, and as live performers from the 1920s to the late 1960s.

== History ==
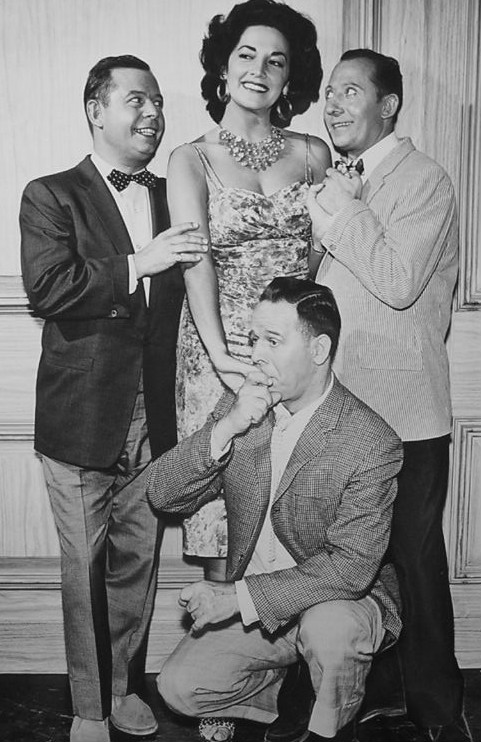
From left: Sylvester, Herbert, and Harry with Carol Byron, from their 1962 television show, Oh! Those Bells

The Wiere Brothers were vaudeville performers who occasionally appeared in films and television. Their films include Hands Across the Border in 1944 with Roy Rogers, Road to Rio in 1947 with Bob Hope and Bing Crosby, and Double Trouble in 1967 as three detectives on the hunt for Elvis Presley. In 1962, the Wiere Brothers had their own television series, called Oh! Those Bells, that aired on CBS. The show was created by Jules White, who had previously directed the Three Stooges, Buster Keaton, and Andy Clyde in short-subject films for Columbia Pictures. Oh! Those Bells included slapstick comedy, but only 13 episodes were aired. The team was still appearing on television in 1970 on shows such as The Merv Griffin Show and Laugh-In and were still touring the same year, but after Sylvester's death in July 1970, Harry and Herbert Wiere discontinued their act. Harry Wiere did make one appearance on the TV series The Bionic Woman in 1976 as the Tipsy Man.

One of their popular acts of the 1960s involved the three brothers playing the violin, guitar, and bass fiddle, and Mildred Seymour, their accompanist, performing a classical piece on the grand piano. Herbert would try to do a serious number on the violin, but would get frustrated with his brothers' hillbilly antics. With a shrug, Herbert would stop playing and decide to balance the violin on his chin. Harry would then notice Herbert's accomplishment and would take the guitar and balance it on his chin. This left Sylvester smiling blandly at the audience, still plucking his bass fiddle. When Sylvester sees Herbert and Harry balancing their instruments on their chins, he would do a long take, turning from his brothers to his huge bass fiddle and then back at them. Then, finally Sylvester would lift the bass fiddle in the air and balance it on his chin for the finale.

The Wiere Brothers appeared in four royal variety performances for the Queen of the United Kingdom.

Inga Wiere, Herbert, Harry, and Sylvester's sister, was married to dancer Jon Zerby. Together they were known as the Dancing Zerbys, a successful nightclub act in the 1940s and 1950s. Actress and dancer Kim Darby is their daughter.

== Films ==
- Variety Hour (1937)
- Vogues of 1938 (1937)
- The Great American Broadcast (1941)
- Swing Shift Maisie (1943)
- Hands Across the Border (1944)
- Showboat Serenade (1944)
- Take It or Leave It (1944) (includes clip from The Great American Broadcast)
- Road to Rio (1947)
- Double Trouble (1967)

== Television ==
- The Jerry Lewis Show (1958)
- Ford Festival (1951)
- Toast of the Town aka The Ed Sullivan Show (1953)
- The Bing Crosby Special (1954)
- The Colgate Comedy Hour (1955)
- Producers' Showcase: Rosalinda (1956)
- Toast of the Town aka The Ed Sullivan Show (1957)
- The Garry Moore Show (1959)
- The Dinah Shore Chevy Show (1960)
- The Perry Como Show (1960)
- Oh! Those Bells (CBS) (1962) (13 episodes)
- The Hollywood Palace (1964)
- The Sammy Davis Jr. Show (1966)
- Rowan and Martin's Laugh In (1969)
- The Bionic Woman: Mirror Image (NBC) (1976) (Harry Wiere appears as Tipsy Man)

== Oh, Those Bells! ==
- "Forget Me Nuts" (March 8, 1962)
- "Unfriendly Friendship Club" (March 15, 1962)
- "Murder in the Jungle" (March 22, 1962)
- "Money Mix-Up" (also known as "Movie Money") (March 29, 1962)
- "Seal of Approval" (April 5, 1962)
- "Too Many Spooks" (April 12, 1962)
- "Monkey Sitters" (April 19, 1962)
- "The Wallet" (April 26, 1962)
- "Ma Scarlet" (May 3, 1962)
- "Short Change" (May 10, 1962)
- "Mexican Holiday" (May 17, 1962)
- "Scratched Fender" (May 24, 1962)
- "Camping Trip" (May 31, 1962)
