= Ben E. Rich =

American novelist

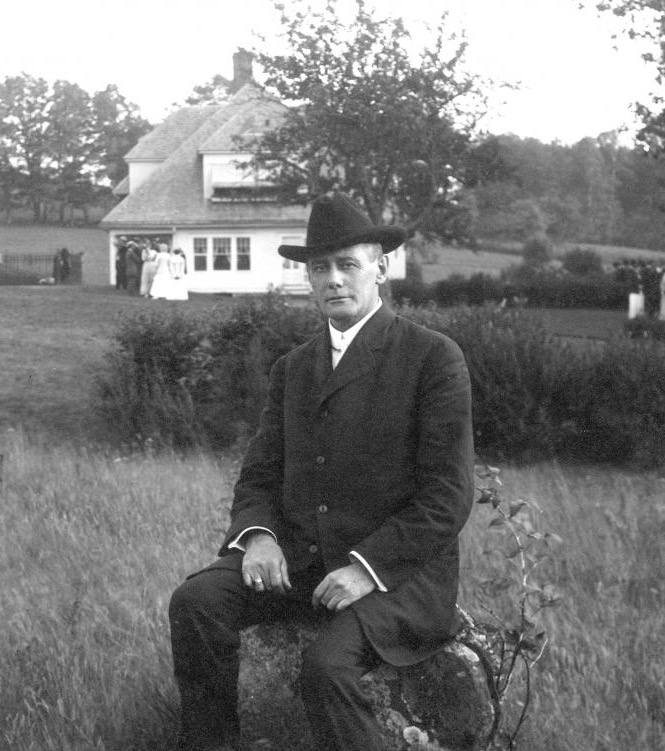
- Born: November 7, 1855; Salt Lake City, Utah
- Died: September 13, 1913 (aged 57); New York, New York
- Father: Charles C. Rich

Ben E. Rich (1855–1913) was a leading missionary and spokesman for the Church of Jesus Christ of Latter-day Saints (LDS Church) in the early 20th century. He was also a publisher, novelist, and an active participant in politics.

Rich was born on November 7, 1855, the son of Charles C. Rich and his plural (polygamist) wife Sarah D. Pea. He first served as a missionary for the LDS Church in Great Britain from 1881 until 1883. For part of this time he oversaw the emigration of Church members from Britain to the United States. He worked as a salesman for Z.C.M.I and then as a store manager for the Goden Equitable Co-operative Store. In 1893 he moved to Rexburg, Idaho where he owned and operated the Rexburg Press, later renamed the Silver Hammer and relocated to St. Anthony, Idaho. Rich also wrote the novel Mr. Durant of Salt Lake City: That Mormon. Rich was a leading Republican and an associate of Theodore Roosevelt.

In 1898 he was made president of the Southern States Mission. When the mission was divided two years later, Rich continued as president of the newly formed Middle States Mission based in Washington, D.C. Upon the death of the president of the Southern States Mission, the Middle States Mission was dissolved and Rich was again assigned to preside over the Southern States Mission. In 1908, he was assigned to the Eastern States Mission, serving there as its president until the time of his death in 1913. As mission president in these areas, he was at the forefront of evangelizing the LDS Church during the Reed Smoot hearings and was involved in several highly publicized debates with leading Protestant preachers, most notably his debate with A. A. Bunner of the Church of Christ. Rich also authored a number of missionary tracts, often drawing on his experience with opposition to the Church, including calls often made by Protestant ministers to forcibly drive out the missionaries.

== Sources ==
- Andrew Jenson, LDS Biographical Encyclopedia, Vol. 3, p. 208-209.
- David F. Boone, "Ben E. Rich" in Arnold K. Garr, et al., ed., The Encyclopedia of Latter-day Saint History (Salt Lake City: Deseret Book, 2000), p. 1019.
