= Crystal Darkness =

2006 television film

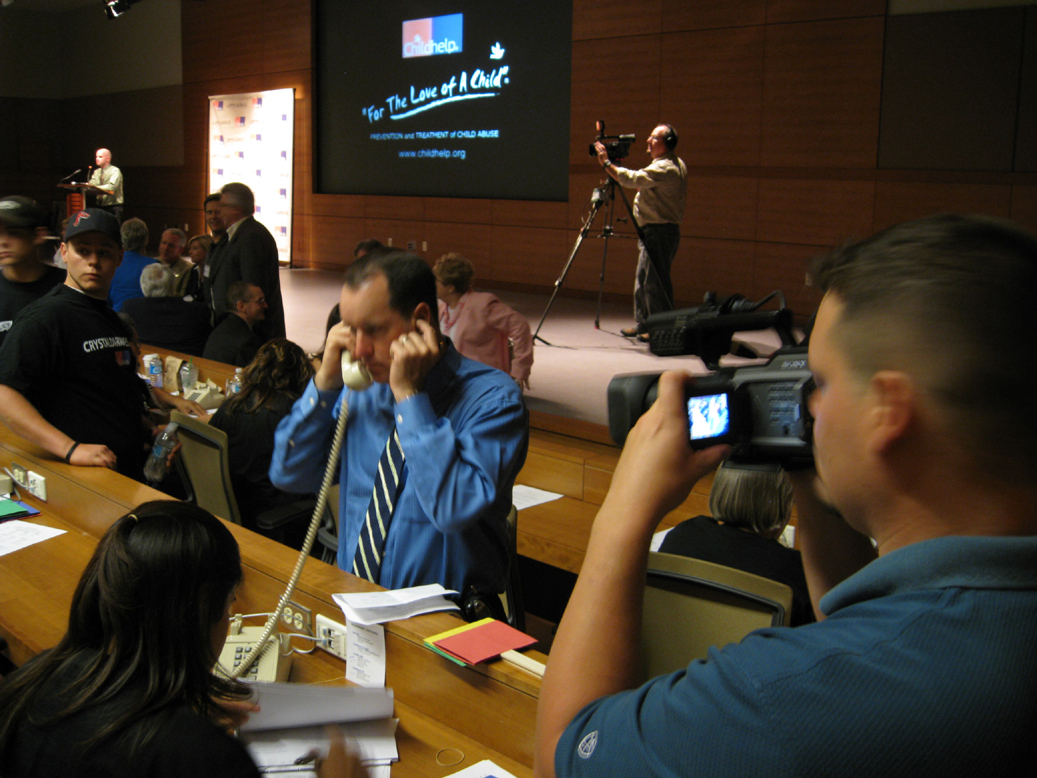
- Childhelp Crystal Darkness Live Call Center
- Directed by: Logan Needham
- Starring: John McCain; Jon Kyl; Sara O'Meara; Yvonne Fedderson; Joe Arpaio
- Original languages: English; Spanish

Production
- Producer: Michael Reynolds
- Editor: Logan Needham
- Running time: 30 minutes

Original release
- Release: 2006

Crystal Darkness is a 30-minute documentary film on the dangers and prevalence of the drug methamphetamine. The film features testimonies of young people who have gone through meth addiction, as well as interviews with high-profile politicians and law enforcement officials.

The documentary is the centerpiece of a city-by-city, state-by-state campaign and has garnered the attention of residents in regions across the United States when it aired. In Arizona alone, the program reached an estimated 2.5 million residents and took over 1,200 phone calls from persons seeking help with meth addiction.

== Production ==
The Crystal Darkness documentary was created and produced in Reno, Nevada in 2006 by Michael Reynolds. The campaign was directed and edited by Logan Needham. The entire program is produced by Global Studio.

A small portion of the film is pre-packaged with information on how meth affects the brain, how it's made, whom it affects and testimonials from law enforcement and individuals who have struggled through its addiction. The rest of the program is filmed in the host city or state with local experts, clinicians and providers, law enforcement, elected officials and recovering addicts.

== Presentation ==
It is unique in that each city it airs, it is run as a media roadblock, wherein all the network stations in a target region air it simultaneously. The program also airs in Spanish on Spanish-language stations.

The documentary features original music by alldaydrive and Today Is The Day NV. Both groups are based in Reno, Nevada.

== Childhelp sponsorship ==
The program is sponsored by Childhelp, a national child abuse prevention and treatment non-profit organization. Childhelp is responsible for maintaining the program’s hot line, 1-888-METH-AID, in addition to its child abuse hot line, 1-800-4-A-CHILD. The non-profit organization reports over two-thirds of the cases of child abuse it handles have a direct correlation to meth use or production by the child’s parents or guardian.

== Campaigns ==
The campaign has reached a large audience wherever it is deployed because of how it is managed. Prior to agreeing to be a host city or state, representatives interested in bringing the program to their community are invited to attend a dinner event the night the program airs in another location. There, they learn from individuals who have run a past campaign what is involved, how the program operates and how they achieved success. Each host city is responsible for pitching the local media to run the program in a media roadblock, where all stations in the region agree to air the program at a certain time and date. The program is a collaboration of effort among religious organizations, law enforcement, elected officials, volunteers, treatment providers, educators, and more. Each is delegated responsibilities ranging from community outreach to compiling a comprehensive provider resource book. Listed below are the regions the campaign has aired in to-date and cities that have campaigns in motion.

=== 2007 ===
- Reno, NV
- Las Vegas, NV
- Oregon
- San Diego, CA

=== 2008 ===
- Sacramento, CA
- El Paso, TX
- Ciudad Juarez, Mexico
- New Mexico
- Arizona
- Sonora, Mexico

=== 2009 ===
- Arkansas
- Central Valley, CA
- Colorado
- Oklahoma

== Emmy Statuette ==
In October 2008, the Arizona Broadcaster's Association received the Governor's Award from the Rocky Mountain Southwest Chapter of the National Academy of Television Arts & Sciences. The Emmy Statuette recognized the work of the Childhelp Crystal Darkness campaign in Arizona and its extensive community outreach. The Governor's Award is given annually to a deserving program and is the highest achievement the NATAS Chapter rewards.
