= Wayne Shanklin =

American songwriter

- Born: June 6, 1916; Joplin, Missouri, U.S.
- Died: June 16, 1970 (aged 54) Orange County, California, U.S.
- Occupations: Singer, songwriter, producer
- Years active: 1950-1970
- Labels: Fabor, Coral, Signet

Wayne Shanklin (June 6, 1916 – June 16, 1970) was an American singer, songwriter and producer. His best known compositions were "Jezebel", "Chanson D'Amour (Song of Love)", "Primrose Lane", and "The Big Hurt".

== Music career ==
In the early 1950s, Shanklin wrote with Al Sherman as well as Sherman's sons, Robert and Richard, who worked under pseudonyms at the time. Shanklin also contributed music to a number of films: "Kiss Me Quick" was featured in the 1957 Randolph Scott western Shoot-Out at Medicine Bend and "I Leaned On A Man" was sung by Virginia Mayo in The Big Land.

Shanklin founded the independent record label Signet Records in Los Angeles in 1959. One of the label's early successes was a song written by Shanklin, "The Big Hurt", which became a #3 hit in early 1960 for Miss Toni Fisher, and is also claimed to be the first commercial use of the production phasing technique known as "flanging".

Shanklin wrote several hit songs, including "Primrose Lane", recorded by Jerry Wallace in 1959, and "Jezebel", recorded by Frankie Laine in 1951. Shanklin's best-known composition was "Chanson D'Amour (Song of Love)". It was first recorded in 1958 in two competing versions by Art and Dotty Todd and The Fontane Sisters, both of which were successful. Also in 1958, Shanklin co-wrote, with Herman L. Harris, Plas Johnson’s "Downstairs" (Capitol Records 4251).

Shanklin composed the original music for the 1961 film Angel Baby, starring George Hamilton and Mercedes McCambridge. Shanklin also wrote Miss Toni Fisher's 1962 single "West of the Wall", which dealt with the partition of East and West Germany and the erection of the Berlin Wall (although the same melody and arrangement were used previously for an obscure Fisher single on Signet called "Toot Toot Amore").

== Covers ==
"Chanson D'Amour (Song of Love)" was later covered by The Lettermen in the 1960s and was revived with great success by vocal jazz quartet The Manhattan Transfer in 1976. Also covered in 1958 by Ray Hartley on harpsichord with the David Terry Orchestra and produced by RCA Victor's Eddie Heller.

"Jezebel" was covered (as an instrumental) by Australian teenage guitar prodigy Rob E.G. in 1963, as well as by Herman's Hermits in 1967. A 1967 version by the Canadian band Witness Inc. reached number 34 in Canada. Shanklin's son Windsor and his band Jaz Dyin recorded a cover of "Jezebel" in 1983.

"Primrose Lane" was used as the theme song for the 1971-72 sitcom The Smith Family, sung by Mike Minor.

Shanklin's songs were used in several recent films: "Primrose Lane" in Primary Colors (1998) and "Chanson D'Amour" in Eyes Wide Shut (1999).

Anna Calvi covered "Jezebel" which was released on Domino Records on October 11, 2010.

== Personal life ==
Shanklin was born June 6, 1916, in Joplin, Missouri to Virra (Storrs) and Nathaniel Shanklin Jr. He had one brother, Nathaniel Noel, and one sister, Dorothy.

He married Grace Bastin in 1934. They had five children: Carolyn, Barbara Faye, Darlene May, Pamela Judith, and Wayne Shanklin Jr. Wayne and Grace divorced in 1942. Later that same year he married Gloria Hansen. They had four children: Helen, Martha, Timothy Michael, and Thorne Scott Shanklin. Wayne and Gloria divorced on August 31, 1960. In 1960, there is a record of Wayne marrying a Trudy Hancock.

He married his longtime secretary, Victoria Helen Hamway, on January 25, 1965. On August 31, 1965, his youngest boy of many children, Edward Windsor Shanklin, was born.

Some sources state that Shanklin and Miss Toni Fisher were married at some point, but no record of the marriage is known to exist. Fisher's daughter, Chris Miller, later married Shanklin's son, Timothy Michael Shanklin. They had one known child.

Wayne Shanklin died June 16, 1970, from a heart attack in Orange County, California. He was survived by his many children, wife Vicki, ex-wives and common-law wives.

== Discography ==
=== Singles ===
- "Up To My Pockets In Tomahawks"/"Plink-a-Plink (Melody For Mandolin)" (Fabor 4007, 1955) (Note: The October 1, 1955, issue of Billboard magazine commented on the single in the "Reviews of New Pop Records" section. Regarding "Plink-A-Plink": "Writer Shanklin is a pleasant-voiced warbler, and the material has an attractive cornball flavor. Will need heavy exposure to step out." Regarding "Up To My Pockets In Tomahawks": "Junior has taken over the house with his Indian props. Cute idea gets a little weighted down.")
- "I Leaned On A Man"/"Stop The Rain In Lover's Lane, For Me Cherie" (Coral 61793, 1957) (Note: Also released in Australia in 1957 on Coral CSP45-1376.)
- "Little Child (Daddy Dear)"/"Somebody Up There Loves Us" (Coral 93 313, Germany, 1957)
- "Beach Boy"/"The Star Of Love" (Yankee Doodle 110, 1962) (Martha Shanklin with Wayne Shanklin & Orch.) (Note: The May 5, 1962, issue of Billboard magazine listed the single in the "Limited Sales Potential" section without comment. Both songs written/co-written by Wayne Shanklin.)

=== Album ===
- The Modern Minstrel (Coral CRL 67124, 1957). (Note: The September 16, 1957 issue of Billboard magazine (p. 56) reviewed the LP in the Folk section: "Wayne Shanklin plays 12 of his songs here including "Jezebel", "Company Money", "The Vanishing Navajo", etc. Material is strongly folk in feeling -- except for the fact that the themes are generally modern and relevant to present-day life. The performances are simple and affecting. He accompanies himself on the Lyric harp guitar.")

Side 1: "Jezebel", "Country Doctor", "Company Money", "The Vanishing Navajo", "Jockey Martin", "Little Child"
Side 2: "Who Will Sing My Song", "Eyes Of Green", "Lonesome, Lonesome, Blues", "I Leaned On A Man", "The Ballad Of Sandy MacAfee", "Somebody Up There Loves Us"

Discography notes
