= Thirty-two bar form =

Song structure

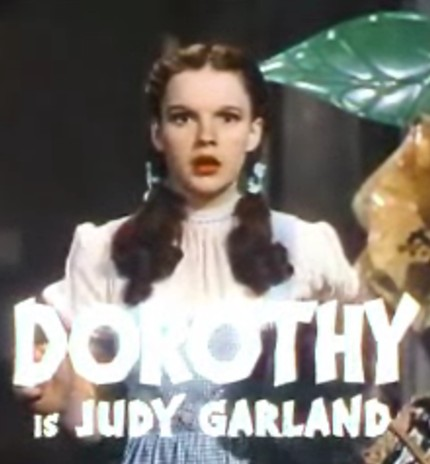
"Over the Rainbow" (Arlen/Harburg) exemplifies the 20th-century popular 32-bar song.

The 32-bar form, also known as the AABA song form, American popular song form and the ballad form, is a song structure commonly found in Tin Pan Alley songs and other American popular music, especially in the first half of the 20th century.

The song form consists of four sections: an eight-bar A section; a second eight-bar A section (which may have slight changes from the first A section); an eight-bar B section, often with contrasting harmony or "feel"; and a final eight-bar A section. The core melody line is generally retained in each A section, although variations may be added, particularly for the last A section.

Examples of 32-bar AABA form songs include "Over the Rainbow", "I Got Rhythm", "What'll I Do", "Make You Feel My Love", "The Man I Love", "Primrose Lane", "Let's Get Away from It All", and "Blue Skies". Many show tunes that have become jazz standards are 32-bar song forms, like "Misty".

== Basic song form ==
At its core, the basic AABA 32-bar song form consists of four sections, each section being eight bars in length, totaling 32 bars. Each of these eight-bar sections is assigned a letter name ("A" or "B"), based on its melodic and harmonic content. The A sections all share the same melody (possibly with slight variations), and the recurring title lyric typically falls on either the first or last line of each A section. The "B" section musically and lyrically contrasts the A sections. The "B" section may use a different harmony that contrasts with the harmony of the A sections. For example, in the song "I've Got Rhythm", the A sections are in the key of B♭, but the B section involves a circle of fifths series of dominant seventh chords going from D^{7}, G^{7}, C^{7}, to F^{7}. Song form terminology is not standardized, and the B section is also referred to as the "middle eight", "bridge", or "primary bridge".

The song form of "What'll I Do" by Irving Berlin is as follows:

Name	Lyric from "What'll I Do" by Irving Berlin
A_{1}	What'll I do when you are far away and I am blue? What'll I do?
A_{2}	What'll I do when I am won'dring who is kissing you? What'll I do?
B	What'll I do with just a photograph to tell my troubles to?
A_{3}	When I'm alone with only dreams of you that won't come true... What'll I do?

== Terminology ==
=== Sectional verse ===
Some Tin Pan Alley songs composed as numbers for musicals precede the main tune with what was called a "sectional verse" or "introductory verse" in the terminology of the early 20th century. This introductory section is usually 16 bars long and establishes the background and mood of the number, with a free musical structure, speech-like rhythms, and rubato delivery, in order to highlight the attractions of the main tune. Some verses contained a second set of lyrics intended to be sung between repeated performances of the main chorus. The sectional verse is often omitted from modern performances. It is not assigned a letter in the "AABA" naming scheme.

The introductory verse from "What'll I Do" by Irving Berlin is as follows:

Gone is the romance that was so divine,
'tis broken and cannot be mended
You must go your way, and I must go mine,
but now that our love dreams have ended...

=== Bridge ===
In music theory, the "bridge" is the B section of a 32-bar form. This section has a significantly different melody from the rest of the song and usually occurs after the second "A" section in the AABA song form. It is also called a middle eight because it happens in the middle of the song and the length is generally eight bars.

=== Terminological confusion ===
In early-20th-century terminology, the main 32-bar AABA section, in its entirety, was called the "refrain" or "chorus". Accordingly, jazz players improvising on the 32-bar sections may still speak today of "blowing for a couple of choruses". This is in contrast to the modern usage of the term "chorus", which refers to a repeating musical and lyrical section in verse–chorus form. Additionally, "verse", "chorus", and "refrain" all have different meanings in modern musical terminology. See the below chart for clarification:

Early terminology	Modern terminology	Definition
Introductory verse or sectional verse	Introductory verse or sectional verse	The opening section, often 16 bars in length, which resembles recitative from opera.
Refrain or chorus	Verse-refrain form or AABA form	The 32-bar section, composed of four separate 8-bar sections, taking the form AABA.
None	Verse	Any of the three individual 8 bar "A" sections
Bridge	Bridge or middle 8 or release or primary bridge	8-bar "B" section
None	Refrain line	This recurring lyric line is often the title of the song (e.g., "Yesterday", "Let's Face the Music and Dance", "Luck Be a Lady").

== History ==
Though the 32-bar form resembles the ternary form of the operatic da capo aria, it did not become common until the late 1910s. It became "the principal form" of American popular song around 1925–1926, with the AABA form consisting of the chorus or the entirety of many songs in the early 20th century. It was commonly used by composers George Gershwin (for example, in "I Got Rhythm" from 1930), Cole Porter, and Jerome Kern, and it dominated American popular music into the 1950s.

The 32-bar form was often used in rock in the 1950s and '60s, after which verse–chorus form became more prevalent. Examples include:

- Jerry Lee Lewis' "Great Balls of Fire" (1957)
- The Everly Brothers' "All I Have to Do Is Dream" (1958)
- The Shirelles' "Will You Love Me Tomorrow" (1960)
- The Beach Boys' "Surfer Girl" (1963)

Though more prevalent in the first half of the 20th century, many contemporary songs show similarity to the form, such as "Memory" from Cats, which features expanded form through the B and A sections repeated in new keys. Songwriters, such as Lennon–McCartney and those working in the Brill Building, also used modified or extended 32-bar forms, often modifying the number of measures in individual or all sections. The Beatles ("From Me to You" [1963] and "Yesterday" [1965]) often extended the form with an instrumental section, second bridge, break, or reprise of the introduction, and another return to the main theme. Introductions and codas also extended the form. In "South of the Border Down Mexico Way" by Gene Autry, "the A sections… are doubled in length, to sixteen bars—but this affects the overall scheme only marginally". The theme tune of the long-running British TV series Doctor Who has, in some incarnations, followed 32-bar form.

== See also ==
- Ballad § Ballad form
- Bar form (AAB)
- Ternary form (ABA)
