= Gold Star Studios =

Defunct recording studio in Hollywood, California

Coordinates: 34°05′26.2″N 118°19′34.2″W

Gold Star Recording Studios
- Industry: Recording studio
- Founded: 1950
- Founder: David S. Gold; Stan Ross
- Defunct: 1984
- Headquarters: 6252 Santa Monica Boulevard; Los Angeles, California, U.S.
- Website: goldstar-studios.com

Gold Star Studios was an independent recording studio located in Hollywood, California. In its entire history, Gold Star was one of the most successful independent commercial recording studios in the world.

Founded by David S. Gold and Stan Ross and opened in October 1950, Gold Star Recording Studios was located at 6252 Santa Monica Boulevard near the corner of Vine Street in Hollywood, the studio name was a combination of the names of the two owners. The studio was known for its custom recording equipment designed and built by Gold.

== Peak years ==
In the mid-1950s, aspiring pop star and future record producer Phil Spector began hanging out at local studios, including Gold Star, hoping to learn about recording. He eventually gained the confidence of Gold Star's house producer-engineer Stan Ross, who took Spector under his wing and taught him the basics of record production. In the early 1960s, Spector used Gold Star as the venue for most of his "Wall of Sound" recordings. It was also used for many important recordings by the Beach Boys, including portions of their 1966 LP Pet Sounds, the international #1 hit "Good Vibrations", and recordings for the aborted Smile project.

The studio was known for its echo chambers. According to Gold, who designed the chambers after years of research and experimentation, they were built in an area of about 20 ft (6.1 m) × 20 ft and were complementary trapezoids 18 ft (5.5 m) long. The walls were thick, specially-formulated cement plaster on heavy isolation forms. Entry into the chambers was through a series of 2 ft (0.61 m) by 2 ft doors, and the opening was only about 20 in (51 cm) wide and high.

Gold Star was responsible for what is believed to be the first commercial use of the production technique called flanging, which was featured on the single "The Big Hurt" by Toni Fisher, written and produced by Wayne Shanklin, who also originated the flanging technique. This was done by placing his thumb on the "flange" of the recording tape reel during vocal playback, which caused the flanging effect when mixed in with the original vocal track. Another of Gold's innovations was a small transmitter that could broadcast mixes over the airwaves, allowing the production team to check the sound on a nearby car’s AM radio, the dominant broadcast medium of the day.

=== Artists ===
The studio was the venue for hundreds of chart-topping recordings by scores of leading pop and rock artists.

It was also widely used by music, film, television, radio and Broadway artists including Frank Loesser, Ben Weisman, Johnny Mercer, Sammy Fain, Bob Sherman, Dick Sherman and Dimitri Tiomkin and it was the recording ‘home’ of the pioneering ABC-TV prime-time pop show Shindig!. Donna Loren, a cast member of Shindig!, recorded there early in her career on the Crest label. Jazz artists who recorded there include Gerry Mulligan, Chet Baker, Oscar Moore, the Hi-Los and Louis Bellson.

Singer-songwriter Johnette Napolitano, co-founder of Concrete Blonde, was the studio's receptionist in the early 1980s.

== Closing ==
Shifting economics caused Gold Star to close its doors in 1984, as newer technology allowed bands to make their own recordings. Several months after the studios were vacated, a fire destroyed the building. A mini-mall was later constructed on the site.

On March 11, 2011, Ross died of complications following an operation to correct an abdominal aneurysm. He was 82. Dave Gold died on January 28, 2026, at the age of 98.
