= Jerry Wallace =

American singer (1928–2008)

- Born: December 15, 1928; Guilford, Missouri, U.S.
- Died: May 5, 2008 (aged 79) Corona, California, U.S.
- Genres: Country; easy listening; traditional pop
- Occupation: Singer
- Instruments: Vocals, guitar
- Years active: 1951–1980
- Labels: Challenge, Mercury, Liberty, London, Decca, MCA, MGM, BMA, 4 Star, Door Knob

Jerry Leon Wallace (December 15, 1928 – May 5, 2008) was an American country and pop singer. Between 1958 and 1964, Wallace charted nine hits on the Billboard Hot 100, including the No. 8 "Primrose Lane" that was later used as the theme song for the television series The Smith Family. He made his debut on the country music charts in 1965, entering it thirty-five times between then and 1980. In that timespan, Wallace charted within the country Top Ten four times. His only number one song was "If You Leave Me Tonight I'll Cry," a song which gained popularity after it was used in an episode of the 1970s TV series Night Gallery.

== Biography ==
Wallace was born in Guilford, Missouri, United States.

Wallace performed for the eighth Cavalcade of Jazz concert held at Wrigley Field in Los Angeles which was produced by Leon Hefflin, Sr. on June 1, 1952. Also featured that day were Roy Brown and His Mighty Men, Anna Mae Winburn and Her Sweethearts, Toni Harper, Louis Jordan, Jimmy Witherspoon and Josephine Baker.

His better-known songs include "How the Time Flies" (1958), "Primrose Lane" (1959, written by Wayne Shanklin and George Callender), "Shutters and Boards" (1963, written by American film actor Audie Murphy and Canadian song producer Scott Turner), "In the Misty Moonlight" (1964), and "Otoko no Sekai" (男の世界; lit. "The World of Man", English title: "The Lovers of the World", the song was later reissued as "Mandom: The World of Man" (マンダム〜男の世界) and localized in as "Mandom: Lovers of the World") (1970) for a commercial for the Japanese company Mandom, his biggest selling single that was released in Japan only. "Primrose Lane" was his biggest hit, reaching No. 8 pop and No. 12 R&B in the US, selling over one million copies and awarded a gold disc. After his song "If You Leave Me Tonight I'll Cry" was featured in the 1972 Night Gallery episode "The Tune in Dan's Cafe," the song became a No. 1 hit on the Billboard magazine Hot Country Singles chart that August, spending two weeks at the top of the chart, crossing to No. 38 pop. "How The Time Flies" was Wallace's first big hit, reaching No. 11 pop and No. 11 R&B.

In 1972, he gained nomination for the Country Music Association Award as Male Vocalist of the Year, and his song "To Get To You" gained nomination for Single of the Year.

Wallace died on May 5, 2008, in Corona, California, after suffering congestive heart failure. A United States Navy veteran of World War II, Wallace was buried at Riverside National Cemetery in Riverside, California.

== Discography ==
=== Albums ===
Year	Album	Chart Positions		Label
Year	Album	US Country	US	Label
1959	Just Jerry	—	—	Challenge
1961	There She Goes	—	—	Challenge
1962	Shutters and Boards	—	—	Challenge
1964	In the Misty Moonlight	—	96	Challenge
1968	This One's On the House	35	—	Liberty
1968	Another Time, Another World	31	—	Liberty
1968	Sweet Child of Sunshine	35	—	Liberty
1972	This Is Jerry Wallace	7	—	Decca
1972	To Get to You	1	—	Decca
1973	Do You Know What It's Like to Be Lonesome?	6	179	MCA
1973	Primrose Lane / Don't Give Up On Me	1	—	MCA
1974	For Wives and Lovers	31	—	MCA
1974	I Wonder Whose Baby (You Are Now) / Make Hay While the Sun Shines	45	—	MCA
1975	Greatest Hits	39	—	MGM
1976	Jerry Wallace	41	—	MGM
1990	Greatest Hits	—	—	Curb

=== Singles ===
Year	Single (A-side, B-side) Both sides from same album except where indicated	Chart Positions					Album
Year	Single (A-side, B-side) Both sides from same album except where indicated	US Country	US	US R&B	CAN Country	CAN	Album
1952	"Miserable Blues" b/w "There'll Be Some Changes Made"	—	—	—	—	—	Non-album tracks
1954	"That's What A Woman Can Do" b/w "Gee, But I Hate To Go Home Alone"	—	—	—	—	—	Non-album tracks
1954	"Runnin' After Love" b/w "Dixie Anna"	—	—	—	—	—	Non-album tracks
1955	"Taj Mahal" b/w "Autumn Has Come and Gone"	—	—	—	—	—	Non-album tracks
1955	"The Greatest Magic Of All" b/w "Walkin' In The Rain"	—	—	—	—	—	Non-album tracks
1956	"On A Night When Flowers Were Dancing" b/w "Gloria"	—	—	—	—	—	Non-album tracks
1956	"Eyes Of Fire Lips Of Wine" b/w "Monkey See Monkey Do"	—	—	—	—	—	Non-album tracks
1957	"Blue Jean Baby" b/w "Fool's Hall Of Fame"	—	—	—	—	—	Just Jerry
1957	"Date Night" b/w "Once With You" (Non-album track)	—	—	—	—	—	Just Jerry
1958	"Good and Bad" b/w "The Other Me"	—	—	—	—	—	Just Jerry
1958	"How The Time Flies" b/w "With This Ring"	—	11	11	—	—	Just Jerry
1958	"Diamond Ring" b/w "All My Love Belongs To You"	—	78	—	—	—	Just Jerry
1959	"A Touch Of Pink" b/w "Off Stage"	—	92	—	—	—	Non-album tracks
1959	"Primrose Lane" b/w "By Your Side" (Non-album track)	—	8	12	—	—	There She Goes
1960	"Little Coco Palm" b/w "Mission Bell Blues"	—	36	—	—	—	Non-album tracks
1960	"You're Singing Our Love Song To Somebody Else" b/w "King Of The Mountain"	—	115	—	—	—	There She Goes
1960	"Swingin' Down the Lane" b/w "Teardrop In The Rain"	—	79	—	—	—	There She Goes
1960	"Only Twenty"; B-side unknown	—	—	—	—	—	Non-album track
1961	"There She Goes" b/w "Angel On My Shoulder"	—	26	—	—	—	There She Goes
1961	"Life's A Holiday" b/w "I Can See An Angel Walking"	—	91	—	—	—	Shutters and Boards
1961	"Lonesome" b/w "Eyes (Don't Give My Secret Away)"	—	110	—	—	—	Non-album tracks
1961	"Rollin' River" b/w "I Hang My Head and Cry"	—	—	—	—	—	Non-album tracks
1962	"Little Miss Tease" b/w "Mr. Lonely"	—	—	—	—	—	Non-album tracks
1962	"You'll Never Know" b/w "Here I Go" (Non-album track)	—	—	—	—	—	Shutters and Boards
1963	"Shutters and Boards" b/w "Am I That Easy To Forget"	—	24	—	—	—	Shutters and Boards
1963	"Move Over (When True Love Walks By)" b/w "On A Merry-Go-Round" (Non-album track)	—	—	—	—	—	In The Misty Moonlight
1963	"Just Walking In The Rain" b/w "San Francisco Mama" (Non-album track)	—	—	—	—	—	In The Misty Moonlight
1963	"Empty Arms Again" b/w "Bambola (My Darling One)" (Non-album track)	—	—	—	—	—	In The Misty Moonlight
1963	"Auf Wiedersehen" b/w "If I Make It Through Today" (Non-album track)	—	—	—	—	—	In The Misty Moonlight
1964	"In the Misty Moonlight"^{A} /	—	19	—	—	35	In The Misty Moonlight
1964	"Even The Bad Times Are Good"	—	114	—	—	—	In The Misty Moonlight
1964	"Butterfly" b/w "Let The Tears Begin" (Non-album track)	—	—	—	—	—	The Best Of Jerry Wallace
1964	"Spanish Guitars" b/w "Even The Bad Times Are Good" (from In The Misty Moonlight)	—	132	—	—	—	Non-album track
1964	"It's A Cotton Candy World" b/w "Keep A Lamp Burning" (Non-album track)	—	99	—	—	—	The Best Of Jerry Wallace
1964	"Careless Hands" b/w "San Francisco De Assisi"	—	—	—	—	—	Non-album tracks
1965	"Helpless" b/w "You're Driving You Out Of My Mind"	—	—	—	—	—	Non-album tracks
1965	"Time" b/w "Rainbow"	—	—	—	—	—	The Best Of Jerry Wallace
1965	"Life's Gone and Slipped Away" b/w "Twelve Little Roses"	23	—	—	—	—	The Best Of Jerry Wallace
1966	"Diamonds and Horseshoes" b/w "Will The Pain Fade Away"	45	—	—	—	—	The Best Of Jerry Wallace
1966	"Wallpaper Roses" b/w "The Son Of A Green Beret"	43	—	—	—	—	Non-album tracks
1966	"Not That I Care" b/w "Release Me (and Let Me Love Again)" (from The Best Of Jerry Wallace)	44	—	—	—	—	Non-album tracks
1967	"Runaway Bay" b/w "Dispossessed"	—	—	—	—	—	This One's On The House
1967	"This One's On The House" b/w "A New Sun Risin'"	36	—	—	—	—	This One's On The House
1968	"The Closest I Ever Came" b/w "That's What Fools Are For"	—	—	—	—	—	Another Time, Another World
1968	"Another Time, Another Place, Another World" b/w "That's What Fools Are For"	69	—	—	—	—	Another Time, Another World
1968	"That's The Fool In Me" b/w "Are You Ready"	—	—	—	—	—	Non-album tracks
1968	"Sweet Child Of Sunshine" b/w "Our House On Paper"	22	—	—	—	—	Sweet Child Of Sunshine
1969	"Son" b/w "Temptation (Make Me Go Home)"	69	—	—	—	—	Sweet Child Of Sunshine
1969	"Venus" b/w "Soon We'll Be There"	—	—	—	—	—	Bitter Sweet
1969	"Swiss Cottage Place" b/w "With Ageing"	71	—	—	—	—	Non-album tracks
1969	"Honey Eyed Girl" b/w "Glory Of My Woman"	—	—	—	—	—	Non-album tracks
1970	"Even The Bad Times Are Good" b/w "For All We Know" (Non-album track)	74	—	—	—	—	Superpak
1971	"After You" /	22	—	—	—	—	This Is Jerry Wallace
1971	"She'll Remember"	51	—	—	—	—	This Is Jerry Wallace
1971	"The Morning After" b/w "I Can't Take It Anymore"	19	—	—	39	—	This Is Jerry Wallace
1972	"To Get To You" b/w "Time" (from This Is Jerry Wallace)	12	48	—	8	—	To Get To You
1972	"If You Leave Me Tonight I'll Cry" b/w "What's He Doin' In My World"	1	38	—	3	38	To Get To You
1972	"Thanks To You For Lovin' Me" b/w "Funny How Time Slips Away" (from	66	—	—	—	—	Superpak
1973	"Do You Know What It's Like to Be Lonesome" b/w "Where Did He Come From"	2	—	—	4	—	Do You Know What It's Like to Be Lonsome?
1973	"Take Me As I Am" b/w "Touch Me"	—	—	—	—	—	Superpak
1973	"Sound Of Goodbye" /	21	—	—	16	—	Do You Know What It's Like to Be Lonsome?
1973	"The Song Nobody Sings"	flip	—	—	—	—	Do You Know What It's Like to Be Lonsome?
1973	"Don't Give Up On Me" b/w "You Look Like Forever" (from To Get Top You)	3	—	—	12	—	Primrose Lane / Don't Give Up On Me
1974	"Guess Who" b/w "All I Ever Wanted Fromm You (Is You)"	18	—	—	44	—	For Wives and Lovers
1974	"My Wife's House" b/w "A Better Way To Say I Love You"	9	—	—	3	—	For Wives and Lovers
1974	"I Wonder Whose Baby (You Are Now)" b/w "Make Hay While the Sun Shines"	20	—	—	47	—	I Wonder Whose Baby (You Are Now) / Make Hay While the Sun Shines
1975	"Comin' Home To You" b/w "River St. Marie" (Non-album track)	32	—	—	—	—	Comin' Home To You
1975	"All I Want Is You" b/w "With Pen In Hand" (from Sweet Child Of Sunshine)	—	—	—	—	—	Bitter Sweet
1975	"Wanted Man" b/w "Your Love" (from Comin' Home To You)	41	—	—	—	—	Jerry Wallace
1975	"Georgia Rain" b/w "In The Garden"	70	—	—	—	—	Jerry Wallace
1976	"The Fool I've Been Today" b/w "Jenny"	—	—	—	—	—	Non-album tracks
1976	"I Can't Keep My Hands Off You" b/w "The Next Plane To Seattle"	—	—	—	—	—	Non-album tracks
1977	"I Miss You Already" b/w "(At) The End (Of A Rainbow)"	26	—	—	—	—	I Miss You Already
1977	"I'll Promise You Tomorrow" b/w "You're On The Run"	28	—	—	—	—	I Miss You Already
1978	"At The End Of A Rainbow" b/w "Looking For A Memory"	24	—	—	—	—	I Miss You Already
1978	"My Last Sad Song" b/w "Out Wickenburg Way"	64	—	—	—	—	I Miss You Already
1978	"I Wanna Go To Heaven" b/w "After You"	38	—	—	—	—	Non-album tracks
1979	"Yours Love" b/w "There She Goes"	67	—	—	—	—	Non-album tracks
1979	"You've Still Got Me" b/w "Now That Sandy's Gone"	68	—	—	—	—	Non-album tracks
1980	"Cling To Me" b/w "Paper Madonna"	56	—	—	—	—	Non-album tracks
1980	"If I Could Set My Love To Music" b/w "Cling To Me"	80	—	—	—	—	Non-album tracks

- ^{A}"In the Misty Moonlight" also peaked at No. 2 on the Pop-Standard Singles chart.
