= Primrose Lane =

Single by Jerry Wallace

from the album There She Goes
- B-side: "By Your Side"
- Released: June 1959 (U.S.)
- Genre: Country
- Length: 2:24
- Label: Challenge Records
- Songwriter(s): Wayne Shanklin and George Callender

Jerry Wallace singles chronology
"A Touch of Pink" (1959)	"Primrose Lane" (1959)	"Little Coco Palm" (1960)

"Primrose Lane" is a song made famous by country music singer Jerry Wallace. Originally released in 1959, the song rose to number 8 on the Billboard Hot 100. The song was ranked #47 on Billboard magazine's Top Hot 100 songs of 1959.

== Background ==
In the song, the singer appears to be serenading his love as they stroll down the street and claiming "life's a holiday" with her.

== Chart performance ==
Chart (1959)	Peak position
U.S. Billboard Hot 100	8

== Cover versions ==
- "Supper-club Soul" singer O.C. Smith remade the song in 1970, scoring a modest hit. The record reached #86 pop, #4 Easy Listening on the Billboard charts.

== Popular culture ==
- In 1971, "Primrose Lane" became the theme song of the ABC drama The Smith Family, sung by producer Don Fedderson's son, Mike Minor.
