= The Big Hurt (song) =

Single by Toni Fisher
- B-side: "Memphis Belle"
- Released: September 1959
- Recorded: 1959
- Studio: Gold Star (Hollywood)
- Genre: Pop
- Length: 2:09
- Label: Signet
- Songwriter: Wayne Shanklin
- Producer: Wayne Shanklin

"The Big Hurt" is a pop song that was a hit for Toni Fisher (billed as "Miss Toni Fisher") in 1959. It was written by Wayne Shanklin. "The Big Hurt" is notable because it featured phasing effects which at that time were rare in popular music; DJ Dick Biondi on WKBW would introduce the record as "Toni Fisher's weird one."

== Music ==
The 45 rpm single plays in C major, even though on the sheet music (copyright 1959 by Music Productions, Hollywood, CA), the song is in the key of F major. The time signature is 4/4, and the tempo is indicated as "Moderate Beguine Tempo." The melody begins with a triplet on beats three and four, a motif that appears throughout the song in every second measure. In the other measures, however, the duple meter is reinforced by using eighth notes in the same location, presumably to prevent the tune from becoming a waltz. Although Toni Fisher does use the triplet in her performance on the record, she takes liberties with it and often uses some form of duple rhythm. She also deviates here and there from the notes as written, but well within the usual range employed by singers for expressive purposes.

The main harmonic idea uses the tonic chord alternating with the Neapolitan chord (the flattened supertonic major chord). (The sheet music has an error that occurs three times, but in the chord symbols only, not in actual piano notation: the A flat diminished chord should really be the E major chord with a G# bass note.) The release (contrasting middle section) is in the key of A flat.

== Effects ==
While trying to strengthen the final mix, the engineer Larry Levine at Gold Star Studios, decided to double-track the whole recording. With the second copy of the tape running at a slightly different speed, this created a flanging effect, where they both started off in sync and the second slowly went out of time with the first.

In a 1968 report on sound effects in pop for Beat Instrumental, Crotus Pike wrote that Fisher's hit "was almost phased from start to finish. The result was like listening to an erratic signal on short wave radio." He wrote that the effect "turned a fairly ordinary song into a million seller", and also noted the precedent it set for the Small Faces' "Itchycoo Park" and Cat Stevens' "A Bad Night" (both 1967).

== Chart performance ==
The song went to No.3 on the Billboard Hot 100 music chart in the United States as well as going to No.16 on the Hot R&B Sides chart. Outside the US, "The Big Hurt" went to No.30 in the UK

== Covers ==
The song was covered numerous times in the mid-to-late-1960s, by artists as diverse as:

- Welsh singer Maureen Evans (1960), her version of the song made it to No.26 in the UK
- Jazz musician Bobby Hutcherson
- Susan Rafey (1966)
- Sandy Posey (1967)
- Scott Walker (1967)
- Del Shannon's 1966 version reached No.94 on the Hot 100 (his only charted single on Liberty Records). In Canada it reached No.29. Shannon's recording produced by Snuff Garrett, also included the phasing effects.
- Wes Montgomery (1966) recorded this with violins carrying the phase-effect part.
- In 1984, the San Francisco-based, dance group, Bearesssense had a minor club hit with their version.
