= In the Misty Moonlight =

Single by Dean Martin
- B-side: Wallpaper Roses
- Released: November 8, 1967
- Recorded: August 24, 1964
- Genre: Country
- Length: 2:44
- Label: Reprise
- Songwriter: Cindy Walker
- Producer: Jimmy Bowen

Dean Martin singles chronology
"Things" (1967)	"In the Misty Moonlight" (1967)	"You've Still Got a Place in My Heart" (1968)

"In the Misty Moonlight"

Single by Jerry Wallace
- B-side: "Even the Bad Times Are Good" (Some copies instead have "Cannon Ball", recorded by the Soul Surfers, on the B-side)
- Released: April 10, 1964
- Recorded: 1964
- Genre: Country
- Length: 2:42
- Label: Challenge
- Songwriter: Cindy Walker

Jerry Wallace singles chronology
"Auf Wiedersehen" (1963)	"In the Misty Moonlight" (1964)	"Butterfly" (1964)

"In the Misty Moonlight" is a country song written by Cindy Walker.

== Recordings ==
One of the first singers to record the song in 1964 was Jim Reeves: it is included on his posthumous album The Jim Reeves Way. There also have been many other artists who have covered the song, but the two most successful versions were recorded by Dean Martin and Jerry Wallace.

Wallace's version was a No. 19 hit on the Billboard Hot 100 when his version was released in 1964. Martin's version was released as a single in 1967. Billboard predicted it would reach the top 60, saying "...country ballad gets a strong pop treatment from Martin that will send it spiraling up the Hot 100 in short order." The single went to number one on the Easy Listening chart and number forty-six on the Billboard Hot 100. The song was Martin's fifth and final number one on the Easy Listening chart.

== See also ==
- List of number-one adult contemporary singles of 1968 (U.S.)

== Other notable versions ==
- Bill Anderson
- Kitty Wells
- Slim Whitman
- Skeeter Davis
- Eddy Arnold
- Jerry Wallace
- Brook Benton
- B. J. Thomas
- Faron Young
- Marty Wood
- Hank Snow
- Lloyd Green (instrumental)
