= Date with the Angels =

American situation comedy TV series (1957–1958)

- "Francis Goes to School"
- Created by: Don Fedderson
- Written by: George Tibbles; Fran Van Hartesveldt; Bill Kelsay
- Directed by: James V. Kern
- Starring: Betty White; Bill Williams; Jimmy Boyd
- Composer: Frank DeVol
- Country of origin: United States
- No. of seasons: 1
- No. of episodes: 33

Production
- Executive producer: Fred Henry
- Producer: Don Fedderson
- Running time: 24–26 minutes
- Production company: Silverstone Films/Don Fedderson Productions

Original release
- Network: ABC
- Release: May 10, 1957 – January 29, 1958

Date with the Angels is an American sitcom that aired on ABC from May 10, 1957, to January 29, 1958, starring Betty White as Vicky Angel.

== Synopsis ==
The series, which stars Betty White and Bill Williams, began as a replacement for The Ray Anthony Show for the same sponsor, Chrysler's Plymouth division. Tom Kennedy was the show's announcer and spokesman for Plymouth.

The series revolves around newly married Vicki Angel and her insurance salesman husband Gus Angel who get themselves and their friends and neighbors into various comedic situations. Besides White and Williams, the series also featured for several episodes Richard Deacon, Richard Reeves, Roy Engel, Maudie Prickett and Burt Mustin. Tom Kennedy was the off-camera announcer at the end of episodes.

Among the series' guest stars were Nancy Kulp, Madge Blake, Dennis Day, Liberace, Joan Vohs, Chuck Connors, Reta Shaw, Dave Willock, Sid Melton, Russell Hicks, Hugh O'Brian, Hanley Stafford, and Willard Waterman.

The show's theme song was "Got a Date With an Angel", a semi-standard introduced in 1932 and long associated with the orchestra of Hal Kemp.

Date with the Angels was loosely based on the Elmer Rice play Dream Girl, and the series was originally intended to revolve heavily around Vicki's daydreaming tendencies, with more than half of a typical episode dedicated to fantasy sequences. However, the sponsor was not pleased with the fantasy elements and successfully exerted pressure to have them eliminated. "Without our dream sequences," White later said, "our show flattened out and became just one more run-of-the-mill domestic comedy[...]I can honestly say that was the only time I have ever wanted to get out of a show."

== Cast ==
Actor	Role
Betty White	Vickie Angel
Bill Williams	Gus Angel
Jimmy Boyd	Wheeler
Richard Reeves	Mr. Murphy
Maudie Prickett	Mrs. Cassie Murphy
Richard Deacon	Roger Finley
Burt Mustin	Mr. Finley
Tom Kennedy	Announcer
Roy Engle	George Clemson
Nancy Kulp	Dolly Cates
George N. Neise	Carl Cates
Natalie Masters	Wilma Clemson
Lillian Bronson	Mrs. Drake
Gage Clark	Dr. Gordon

== Episodes ==
Episode #	Episode Title	Original Airdate
1	"Vicki Goes to a Party"	May 10, 1957
2	"Mother by Proxy"	May 17, 1957
3	"High Fever"	May 24, 1957
4	"The Wheel"	May 31, 1957
5	"The Tree in the Driveway"	June 7, 1957
6	"The Feud"	June 14, 1957
7	"Shall We Dance?"	June 21, 1957
8	"Little White Lies"	June 28, 1957
9	"The Blue Tie"	July 12, 1957
10	"Heartburn"	July 19, 1957
11	"The Surprise"	July 26, 1957
12	"Pike's Pique"	August 2, 1957
13	"Return of the Wheel"	September 2, 1957
14	"The Gorilla"	September 13, 1957
15	"Everybody's Baby"	September 20, 1957
16	"Catered Party"	September 27, 1957
17	"The Convention"	October 4, 1957
18	"Night School"	October 11, 1957
19	"Star Struck"	October 25, 1957
20	"Diane"	November 1, 1957
21	"Nobody's Father"	November 8, 1957
22	"No-Risk Policy"	November 15, 1957
23	"The Burglar"	November 22, 1957
24	"The Chateau"	November 29, 1957
25	"Chip Off the Old Block"	December 6, 1957
26	"Santa's Helper"	December 13, 1957
27	"Cousin Herbie"	December 20, 1957
28	"A Day at the Track"	December 27, 1957
29	"Wheeler at the Cabin"	January 1, 1958
30	"The Train"	January 8, 1958
31	"Double Trouble"	January 15, 1958
32	"Francis Goes to School"	January 22, 1958
33	"What an Opportunity"	January 29, 1958

== Production ==
Don Fedderson was the producer, Fred Henry was the executive producer, James V. Kern was the director, and George Tibbal was the head writer. Initially, Desilu Productions filmed episodes for the Don Fedderson Company using a live-on-film technique. Shortly before the show was canceled, plans called for changing to live broadcasts. The series produced 33 filmed episodes before it was canceled in late January 1958. The show originally was broadcast on Fridays from 10 to 10:30 p.m. Eastern Time. In July 1957 it was moved to 9:30 to 10 p.m. E. T. on Fridays. Beginning on January 1, 1958, The Betty White Show, "a live comedy-variety series", occupied that time slot, with Date with the Angels moving to Wednesdays at 9:30 p.m. E. T. until January 29, 1958, when it ended. The cancellation meant that the show ended less than halfway through its original contract. Plymouth had contracted for 74 weeks, with options up to seven years. The trade publication Billboard reported that the agreement was "believed to be the longest commitment any sponsor has ever made for a new program."

== Critical response ==
A review of the premiere episode in The New York Times said, "The first show was a little more trite, uninspired and contrived than any of its contemporaries ..." The review concluded, "The only thing uproarious about the performance was the canned laughter, and even that seemed strange."

A review of the same episode in the trade publication Broadcasting said that it tended "too often to lapse into hackneyey lines and situations". The review also noted that levels of laughter on the recorded track did not match what was seen: "often when a raised eye or puzzled expression should evoke a satisfactory chuckle, there is a disconcerting wave of audience roars." The most positive aspects of the review commended the commercials.
