= West of the Wall =

Single by Toni Fisher
- B-side: "What Did I Do"
- Released: 1962
- Studio: Gold Star Recording Studio, Hollywood, California
- Genre: Traditional Pop
- Length: 2:29
- Label: Bigtop Records
- Songwriter: Wayne Shanklin

Toni Fisher singles chronology
"Love Big" (1961)	"West of the Wall" (1962)	"The Music from the House Next Door" (1962)

"West of the Wall" is a 1962 song written by Wayne Shanklin, and was recorded as a single by Toni Fisher. It was recorded at Gold Star Recording Studio, Hollywood.

== Background ==
The song tells of the sadness of lovers separated by the Berlin Wall which divided West Berlin from surrounding East Germany, including East Berlin at the time, and expresses the hope that the wall will soon fall. The Berlin Wall had been constructed in 1961, and in fact did not fall until 1989. Fisher's earlier 1961 single for the Signet record label, "You Never Told Me", had "Toot Toot Amore" on the B side, which was the same melody and arrangement as "West of the Wall" with different lyrics.

== Chart performance ==
The song was a Top 40 hit for Toni Fisher in the United States, where it reached #37 on the Billboard Hot 100 in July 1962. It was issued on the Bigtop label. It enjoyed greater success in Australia, where it reached #1 on the Australian chart for two weeks beginning 21 July.
