= Toni Fisher =

Tony Fisher

Background information
- Born: December 4, 1924; Los Angeles, California
- Died: January 11, 1999 (aged 74) Salt Lake City, Utah, U.S.
- Genres: Pop
- Occupation: Singer
- Labels: Signet Records, Bigtop Records
- Formerly of: Wayne Shanklin

Toni Fisher (December 4, 1924 – January 11, 1999), also billed on her records as Miss Toni Fisher, was an American pop singer. She was known for her recordings of "The Big Hurt", "West of the Wall", "Maybe (He'll Think Of Me)", and "Why Can't The Dark Leave Me Alone". She was later known as Toni F. Monzello following her marriage to Henry Monzello.

== Biography ==
Fisher is best remembered for her 1959 song "The Big Hurt", written by her manager Wayne Shanklin. The song went to No. 3 on the Billboard Hot 100 chart in the US. The track also peaked at No. 30 in the UK Singles Chart. "The Big Hurt" is notable because it featured a flanging effect, when mixing engineer Larry Levine—who went on to help Phil Spector create his wall of sound—decided to double-track the whole recording while trying to strengthen the final mix. With the second copy of the tape running at a slightly different speed causing the effect. It is claimed to be the first record to have such phasing. DJ Dick Biondi on WKBW in Buffalo, New York, had introduced the record "Here's Toni Fisher's weirdo". The song was recorded in the Gold Star Studios in Los Angeles and engineered by Stan Ross and Dave Gold.

Disc jockey Wink Martindale commented that the record label billed the singer as "Miss Toni Fisher" because of her powerful voice, which is consistently audible over the phasing, the instruments, and the background noise, to confirm to the listener that the singer is indeed a woman.

"The Big Hurt" was later covered by Wes Montgomery, Del Shannon, Scott Walker, Vikki Carr, Nick Cave, and others.

In 1962 she had another Top 40 hit single with "West of the Wall" (No. 37), a song about the sadness of lovers separated by the 1961 erection of the Berlin Wall. She had recorded the melody before; an earlier version, "Toot Toot Amore" on Signet Records, had different lyrics.

Fisher died in Salt Lake City, Utah, on January 11, 1999, of a heart attack at age 74.
