= Yvonne Lime =

American actress and philanthropist (1935–2026)

Yvonne Fedderson
- Lime in Happy, 1960
- Born: Yvonne Glee Lime; April 7, 1935; Glendale, California, U.S.
- Died: January 23, 2026 (aged 90); Paradise Valley, Arizona, U.S.
- Education: Pasadena Playhouse
- Occupations: Actress, philanthropist
- Years active: 1956–1968
- Spouse: Don Fedderson (m. 1969; died 1994)
- Children: 1

Yvonne Fedderson (born Yvonne Glee Lime; April 7, 1935 – January 23, 2026) was an American actress and philanthropist, best known as the co-founder of Childhelp and garnering in the process five consecutive Nobel Peace Prize nominations (2000–2005) for her humanitarian work. She was married to producer Don Fedderson.

Lime appeared on screen from 1956 to 1968. Thereafter, she devoted much of her time to philanthropy. She played the starring role of Joyce Martin in the movie High School Hellcats (1958), and played Arlene Logan in I Was a Teenage Werewolf (1957).

== Background ==
Yvonne Glee Lime was born on April 7, 1935. She graduated in 1953 from Glendale High School, having obtained a special permit to attend there, rather than the otherwise assigned Hoover High School.

After high school, Lime attended the Pasadena Playhouse, where her performance in a production of Eugene O'Neill's Ah, Wilderness! attracted the attention of an agent. This landed her into the recurring part of Dottie Snow on twelve episodes of Robert Young's situation comedy, Father Knows Best. She played a friend of Betty Anderson.

== Acting and philanthropy ==
Lime's first film appearance was in The Rainmaker (1956), as Snookie Maguire. In 1957, she was cast in films, in an uncredited part as Sally in Elvis Presley's Loving You and in Michael Landon's I Was a Teenage Werewolf, and with top billing in Dragstrip Riot (1958). She and TV producer Don Fedderson married in 1969, and had a daughter, Dionne Fedderson; he had seven children from two previous marriages, including actor Mike Minor.

After she married Fedderson, Lime left acting to concentrate her time to philanthropy. In the 1950s, she entertained American troops stationed in Japan. Lime and actress Sara Buckner O'Meara, who met when they were guest stars on The Adventures of Ozzie and Harriet, launched International Orphans Inc., a charity that built and maintained four orphanages in Japan and five orphanages, a hospital, and a school in Vietnam. Lime and O'Meara later devoted their efforts to assist neglected children in the United States and renamed their group, Childhelp, an organization based in Scottsdale, Arizona. The two were also involved in Operation Babylift at the time of the American military evacuation during the Fall of Saigon.

From 1960 to 1961, Lime co-starred as Sally Day on the NBC sitcom Happy. She and Ronnie Burns played owners of a motel in southern California who have a talking baby, Happy. She also appeared in varying roles from 1956 to 1958 in eleven episodes of The George Burns and Gracie Allen Show.

Lime's first television appearance was on her future husband's The Millionaire as Eileen in "The Story of Jane Costello." She appeared in 1956 as Mary Lou Carter in the episode, "The Select Females," of the CBS series The Adventures of Jim Bowie. In 1957, she portrayed Gloria Binks in the Hardy Boys serial, The Mystery of Ghost Farm. That same year she played Mary in "A Coney Island Wedding" on the ABC series Crossroads. In 1958, she played Iris on "Ladies' Aide", an episode of The People's Choice.

From 1959 to 1961, she appeared twice each on two CBS sitcoms, The Many Loves of Dobie Gillis and Bringing Up Buddy. Lime also was cast in episodes of NBC's Wichita Town and Bat Masterson, and on CBS's Gomer Pyle, U.S.M.C. Her last acting role was on her husband's sitcom My Three Sons as Linda in the 1968 episode "The Grandfathers".

== Later life and death ==
Fedderson and her daughter, Dionne, resided in Paradise Valley, Arizona. She was the author of Miracle Healing: God's Call: Testimonials of Miracles Through Sara Buckner O'Meara, published in 2011. Lime died at her home in Paradise Valley, Arizona, on January 23, 2026, at the age of 90.

== Sources ==
- Weaver, Tom (June 21, 2010). I Was a Monster Movie Maker: Conversations with 22 SF and Horror Filmmakers — Yvonne Lime, pages 141–150. West Jefferson, North Carolina: McFarland. ISBN 9780786462650.
