= The Smith Family (TV series) =

American television series

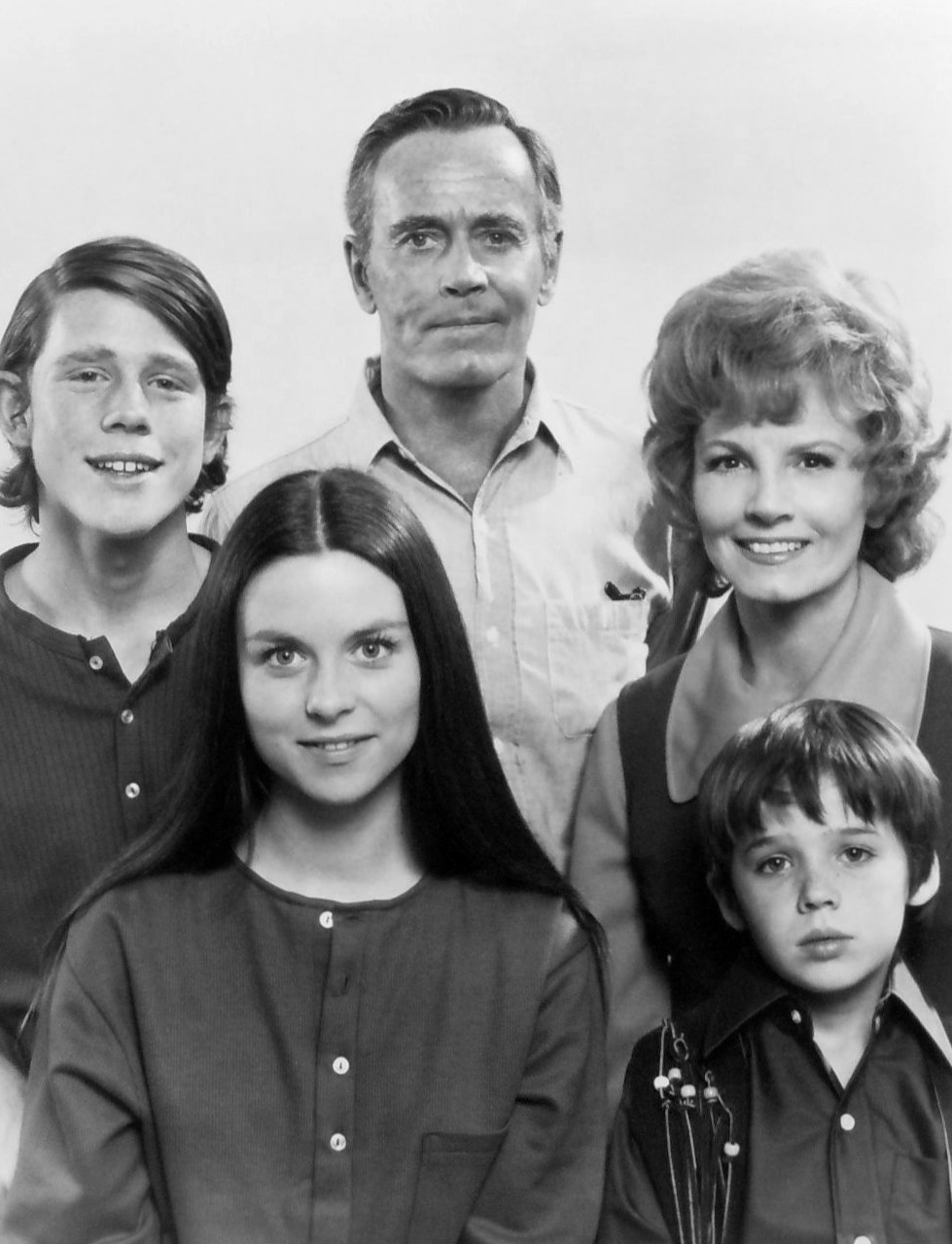
- Cast photo
- Created by: Edmund L. Hartmann
- Directed by: Herschel Daugherty
- Starring: Henry Fonda; Janet Blair; Darleen Carr; Ron Howard; Michael-James Wixted
- Theme music composer: George "Red" Callender; Wayne Shanklin
- Opening theme: "Primrose Lane" performed by Mike Minor
- Country of origin: United States
- Original language: English
- No. of seasons: 2
- No. of episodes: 39

Production
- Executive producer: Don Fedderson
- Running time: 30 minutes
- Production companies: Don Fedderson Productions; CBS Productions

Original release
- Network: ABC
- Release: January 20, 1971 – June 7, 1972

The Smith Family is an American family drama television series starring Henry Fonda and Ron Howard and produced by Don Fedderson Productions. The series aired on ABC from January 20, 1971, to June 7, 1972, for 39 episodes.

== Synopsis ==
Chad Smith is a police detective in Los Angeles. The show covers the exploits of Sergeant Smith and his relationships with his wife Betty and their three children: 18-year-old Cindy, 15-year-old Bob and 7-year-old Brian.

The first season theme song is an adapted version of "Primrose Lane", composed by George Callender and Wayne Shanklin.

== Cast ==
- Henry Fonda as Detective Sergeant Chad Smith, the father of the Smith family
- Janet Blair as Betty Smith, Chad's wife
- Darleen Carr as Cindy Smith, the daughter
- Ron Howard as Bob Smith, the elder son
- Michael-James Wixted as Brian Smith, the younger son
- John Carter as Sgt. Ray Martin
- Vince Howard as Sgt. Ed Thomas
- Richard O'Brien as Captain O'Farrell

== Episodes ==
=== Season 1 (1971) ===
No. overall	No. in season	Title	Directed by	Written by	Original release date
1	1	"Cindy"	Herschel Daugherty	Edmund L. Hartmann	January 20, 1971
Chad is asked by the mother of one of Cindy's friends to investigate her daughter's apparent use of marijuana, which leads to Cindy being shunned by her friends. Featuring Heather Menzies and June Vincent.
2	2	"The Ex-Con"	Herschel Daugherty	Paul West	January 27, 1971
An ex-convict seeks Chad's help in getting back on his feet in society, but Chad discovers it's hard to change other people's attitudes towards ex-cons. Featuring Paul Petersen.
3	3	"Chicano"	Herschel Daugherty	Blanche Hanalis	February 3, 1971
Brian's new friend is the younger sister of a Latino activist Chad arrests in connection with a series of barrio bombings. Featuring A Martinez and Carlos Romero.
4	4	"The Blue Tie"	Herschel Daugherty	Sydney Boehm	February 10, 1971
Betty worries when Chad's partner calls him during a time when someone is ambushing policemen.
5	5	"All the Good Neighbors"	Herschel Daugherty	Paul West	February 17, 1971
Chad's identity as a policeman seems to come in handy when his neighbors need him, until some hippies rent a house in the neighborhood and the neighbors expect Chad to evict them.
6	6	"One More Goodbye"	Herschel Daugherty	Paul West	February 24, 1971
On a stakeout, Chad becomes the target of a pair of gunrunners with a personal vendetta against him.
7	7	"The Strangers"	Herschel Daugherty	John McGreevey	March 3, 1971
When one of Cindy's friends runs away from home to find herself, Chad discovers her wealthy parents gave her all the material possessions they could, but they left out one vital component. Featuring Jo Ann Harris.
8	8	"Another Day, Another Dollar"	Herschel Daugherty	Edmund Beloin and Henry Garson	March 10, 1971
Chad spends the day as a technical advisor on a Hollywood set, while at home the family is deceived by a man claiming to be Chad's old army buddy, who in reality holds a bitter grudge against him. Featuring Henry Jones.
9	9	"The Desk Job"	Herschel Daugherty	Preston Wood	March 17, 1971
After getting hurt on the job, Chad is temporarily assigned to desk duty. While Betty hopes the move might become permanent, Chad becomes restless and more interested in a case of dynamite theft than his desk work.
10	10	"Brian and the Sheriff"	Herschel Daugherty	Blanche Hanalis	March 24, 1971
Arthur O'Connell plays a sheriff from the Old West who takes up arms (with Chad and Brian near his side) in order to preserve his home from being bulldozed.
11	11	"Remember Lisa"	Herschel Daugherty	Austin and Irma Kalish	March 31, 1971
An old flame seeks Chad's help when her son is found in a crashed stolen car, while Betty and the kids start to wonder if there's still some fire left between the old flames. Featuring Joanne Dru.
12	12	"Rookie"	Herschel Daugherty	John McGreevey	April 7, 1971
Chad's new partner is a gung-ho detective he tries to tame, a task made more difficult when his new partner starts dating Cindy.
13	13	"The Peer Group"	Herschel Daugherty	Austin and Irma Kalish	April 14, 1971
Bob is caught in a dilemma when he discovers the identities of some classmates who vandalized a classroom and plan to commit arson next.
14	14	"Greener Pastures"	Herschel Daugherty	Burt Styler	April 21, 1971
Chad, recuperating from some minor injuries after serving a warrant, contemplates a job offer with a private detective agency. Featuring Barbara Nichols.
15	15	"No Place to Hide"	Herschel Daugherty	Blanche Hanalis	April 28, 1971
A narcotics investigation hits very close to home for Chad: it's at Brian's school.

=== Season 2 (1971–1972) ===
No. overall	No. in season	Title	Directed by	Written by	Original release date
16	1	"Anniversary"	Herschel Daugherty	Sydney Boehm	September 15, 1971
A busy day at the precinct threatens an anniversary dinner for Chad and Betty, and the day just gets worse when a bomb threat is phoned into the station house. Featuring Greg Mullavey.
17	2	"State's Witness"	Herschel Daugherty	John McGreevey	September 22, 1971
A friendship gets sorely tested when Chad's friend, a successful trial attorney, puts Chad under an intense cross-examination at trial for a murder suspect Chad arrested. Featuring Alex Dreier.
18	3	"Stakeout"	Herschel Daugherty	Sydney Boehm	September 29, 1971
Bob and Cindy jump to conclusions when Chad embarks on a stakeout at a local lovers' lane with a pretty female detective. Featuring Ahna Capri and Gene Evans.
19	4	"Lost Lady"	Herschel Daugherty	Burt Styler	October 6, 1971
When Chad discovers a faded, alcoholic Hollywood starlet at the precinct and talks about her at home, Cindy and Bob take it upon themselves to try rehabilitating her. Featuring Sheree North.
20	5	"Father's Day"	Herschel Daugherty	John McGreevey	October 13, 1971
Fresh off a successful stakeout, Chad's plan for a relaxing day at home is compromised by the kids' personal problems: Bob is due in juvenile court, and Cindy deals with a suitor reluctant to ask out a cop's daughter.
21	6	"Blind Chance"	Herschel Daugherty	Austin and Irma Kalish	October 20, 1971
Chad switches shifts with another officer to attend Brian's Parents Night at school, but the officer he swapped with ends up dying in the line of duty that night.
22	7	"Mac"	Herschel Daugherty	Alan J. Levitt and Sydney Boehm	October 27, 1971
Brian is rescued after being hit by a car, but the man who saved him harbors a secret: he's a prison escapee convicted of murder. Featuring Neville Brand.
23	8	"Rumpus Room"	Herschel Daugherty	Sydney Boehm and Joseph Bonaduce	November 3, 1971
To finance some home improvements, Chad moonlights as a bodyguard for a wealthy man concerned about being robbed, but the man raises suspicions in Chad. Featuring Rick Jason.
24	9	"Ambush"	Herschel Daugherty	Preston Wood	November 10, 1971
The sole witness to the shooting of two policemen, a young girl, is given protection by the Smiths. Featuring Pamela McMyler.
25	10	"The Weekend"	Herschel Daugherty	Paul West	November 17, 1971
Chad's advice to the father of one of Cindy's friends — trust your daughter — is put to a stern test when Cindy plans an overnight trip with friends. Featuring Herbert Anderson.
26	11	"Man in the Middle"	Herschel Daugherty	Austin and Irma Kalish	November 24, 1971
The bombing of an underground newspaper creates suspicion from the radicals publishing it, as well as discussions about press freedoms by the Smith kids, who read that newspaper. Featuring Geoffrey Deuel and Tim Considine.
27	12	"Class of '46"	Herschel Daugherty	John McGreevey	December 8, 1971
Chad receives a tempting job offer from an old friend recently promoted to police commissioner; Cindy discusses the institution of marriage with her parents, who learn she's not exactly sold on the notion. Featuring John Larch.
28	13	"Family Man"	Herschel Daugherty	Preston Wood	December 15, 1971
When Chad's temporary partner shows anger-management issues stemming from his personal life, Chad invites him home to show him how family relations don't have to lead to anger on the job. Featuring Ned Romero.
29	14	"Christmas Rush"	Herschel Daugherty	Robert Pirosh	December 22, 1971
Chad gives up his Christmas for a fellow officer about to go on his honeymoon, but the kids have planned a holiday away so Chad and Betty could spend a second honeymoon together alone.
30	15	"Taste of Fear"	Herschel Daugherty	Preston Wood	December 29, 1971
Bob goes on a ride-along for his Explorer Scout training, but his reaction to getting caught in a shootout makes him question whether law enforcement is the right career path for him. Featuring John Agar and John Vivyan.
31	16	"Where There's Smoke"	Herschel Daugherty	Susan Silver	January 5, 1972
A woman attempting to derail a jewelry-theft investigation of her boyfriend falsely accuses Chad of assault. Featuring Susan Oliver and Mark Miller.
32	17	"Off Duty Cop"	Herschel Daugherty	Paul West	April 12, 1972
Chad's actions (or lack thereof) during a supermarket robbery and shooting while he was off-duty lead to questions from the public about his bravery.
33	18	"Winner Take All"	Herschel Daugherty	John McGreevey	April 19, 1972
Chad's investigation into the murder of an armed guard during a robbery leads to an old friend, an ex-cop, as the driver of the armored car. Featuring Guy Madison.
34	19	"San Francisco Cop"	Herschel Daugherty	Austin and Irma Kalish	April 26, 1972
Chad is enlisted to help a visiting San Francisco detective locate an 18-year-old runaway: his daughter. Featuring Benson Fong.
35	20	"My Mother, the Star"	Herschel Daugherty	Blanche Hanalis	May 10, 1972
Chad and his partner struggle to find a burglar who assaults elderly women; Betty makes the best of managing a PTA benefit talent show.
36	21	"Rogue Cop"	Herschel Daugherty	Austin and Irma Kalish	May 17, 1972
Chad becomes alarmed with a wealthy rookie's entitled attitude on the job. The rookie also happens to be dating Cindy. Featuring Aron Kincaid.
37	22	"Ten O'Clock and All Is Well"	Herschel Daugherty	S.A. Long	May 24, 1972
While Chad and Betty try to enjoy a night out, Bob and Cindy inadvertently leave Brian alone at home.
38	23	"Homecoming"	Herschel Daugherty	Paul West	May 31, 1972
Can you go home again? Chad and Betty find the answer while returning to Philadelphia on a working holiday: Chad is there to escort a prisoner back to Los Angeles.
39	24	"Father-in-Law"	Herschel Daugherty	Robert Pirosh	June 7, 1972
Cindy's latest beau, a young man hoping for a career in law enforcement, meets with her parents' initial approval, only to lose it when a pattern of concerning behavior develops in the young man. Featuring Tim Matheson and Jonathan Lippe.
