= Don Fedderson =

American executive producer (1913–1994)

- Born: Donald Joy Fedderson; April 16, 1913; Beresford, South Dakota, U.S.
- Died: December 18, 1994 (aged 81); Los Angeles, California, U.S.
- Spouses: Helen Macie "Tido" Minor (m. 1938; div. 1968); Yvonne Lime (m. 1969)
- Children: 7, including Mike Minor

Donald Joy Fedderson (April 16, 1913 – December 18, 1994) was an American executive producer who created a number of television programs including The Millionaire, My Three Sons and Family Affair.

== Career ==
Fedderson was born April 16, 1913, in Beresford, South Dakota. His family moved to Kansas, where he worked on the business and advertising staffs of The Wichita Eagle and Wichita Beacon newspapers.

In 1942 he became an account executive of the San Francisco News and then sales manager of San Francisco radio station KYA, rising to president and general manager and collecting a Peabody Award for a program he developed.

Los Angeles radio station KMTR was added to his charge when the New York Post bought it and KYA. KMTR changed call letters to KLAC in 1946 and added a television station, KLAC-TV, two years later. Fedderson was in charge of radio and TV broadcasts for five years.

Fedderson formed his own television company in 1953 and signed Liberace to a contract that put him before a nationwide TV audience. It was one of several shows starring the flamboyant pianist on network and syndicated television.

He also produced the syndicated series Life with Elizabeth starring Betty White in 1953–54, The Millionaire with Marvin Miller on CBS from 1955 to 1960, and Date with the Angels, again with Betty White, on ABC in 1957–58.

Fedderson's company became TV consultants to bandleader Lawrence Welk in 1954 and put him on ABC from 1955 to 1971, then syndicated his program widely until 1982.

His biggest success on television, however, began in 1960 with My Three Sons, starring Fred MacMurray, of which Fedderson served as the executive producer. The show aired for five years on ABC and another seven on CBS, producing a total of 380 episodes, making it the fourth longest-running live-action sitcom among American prime-time network programs.

Fedderson produced Family Affair, starring Brian Keith as a substitute father for a nephew and two nieces, and Sebastian Cabot as his servant, which ran on CBS from 1966 to 1971, The Smith Family, an ABC series starring Henry Fonda as a detective from 1971 to 1972; and To Rome with Love, with John Forsythe, on CBS from 1969 to 1971.

He also delved successfully into game shows. He produced Do You Trust Your Wife with Edgar Bergen as host of the primetime quiz show on CBS from 1956 to 1957. It subsequently switched to ABC as a daytime show hosted by Johnny Carson and also called Do You Trust Your Wife, then within a year the title was changed to Who Do You Trust?. Game show host Carson was joined in 1958 by announcer Ed McMahon, who left with Carson in 1962 for the Tonight Show on NBC. The game show, which by then sported a ″Whom″ instead of a ″Who″ in its title, ran for one more year through 1963 with host Woody Woodbury.

On November 14, 1974, Fedderson received a star on the Hollywood Walk of Fame for his contribution to the television industry, at 1735 N. Vine Street.

== Personal life ==
Fedderson was married to actress Helen Macie "Tido" Minor from 1938 to 1968. He fathered seven children, two of whom became actors: Gregg Fedderson and Mike Minor. In 1969, he married actress Yvonne Lime, the co-founder of Childhelp. They remained married until his death.

== Death ==
Fedderson died on December 18, 1994, at the age of 81, from heart disease while being treated at the Cedars-Sinai Hospital in Los Angeles, California. He is interred at Glendale's Forest Lawn Memorial Park.
