= Childhelp =

American non-profit working to prevent and treat child abuse

- Formation: 1959; 67 years ago
- Founders: Yvonne Fedderson; Sara O'Meara
- Type: 501(c)(3) non-profit organization
- Headquarters: Phoenix, Arizona, US
- Website: childhelp.org

Childhelp is a US non-profit organization dedicated to the prevention and treatment of child abuse. Founded in 1959 as International Orphans, Inc. by Sara O'Meara and Yvonne Fedderson, Childhelp is one of the largest non-profit child abuse prevention and treatment organizations in the nation. It operates facilities in California, Virginia, Tennessee, and Arizona. The Childhelp National Child Abuse Hotline services all of the United States, its territories and Canada. The organization also distributes Childhelp Speak Up Be Safe, a school-based abuse and bullying prevention program.

The organization offers a wide variety of services, not only to abused and neglected children, but to treatment professionals, educators, parents, foster care families, the community and law enforcement professionals. Through various community outreach efforts, Childhelp has tried to increase awareness about child abuse and, in 2000, established the National Day of Hope. It is observed every year on the first Wednesday of April during National Child Abuse Prevention Month. In 2009, the organization celebrated its 50th anniversary. Childhelp relies upon private donations to expand its operations and services across the nation.

According to a 2007 report by the U.S. Department of Health and Human Services, almost five children die every day to child abuse and neglect and millions more reports are made every year of abuse.

== Founders ==
Childhelp Founders Sara O'Meara and Yvonne Fedderson on the set of the Today Show (2008)

Sara O'Meara (then Sara Buckner) and Yvonne Lime Fedderson (then Yvonne Lime) first met in 1958 on the set of the ABC situation comedy, The Adventures of Ozzie & Harriet. The two played the part of Ricky Nelson's girlfriend and quickly became friends.

While on a government-sponsored goodwill tour to support the troops in Tokyo the pair founded Childhelp in 1959 when they opened International Orphans to support 11 Japanese-American children found wandering the streets, unable to get into any orphanages because of their mixed heritage. Within three weeks the number of children increased to 100.

Over the years Childhelp became one of the largest child abuse prevention and treatment non-profit organizations and operate today as chairman and CEO (Sara) and President (Yvonne). Their efforts have won them more than 100 awards and honors. The most recent award in June 2008, was the 2008 Most Dynamic Woman Award from Clarins USA. Sara and Yvonne have been nominated for the Nobel Peace Prize for five consecutive years from 2005 to 2009, receiving endorsements from prestigious figures such as former U.S. Supreme Court Justice Sandra Day O'Connor and former First Lady Barbara Bush.

=== Sara O'Meara ===
As Childhelp Co-founder, chairman and CEO Sara O'Meara is actively involved in the development and oversight of the organization. Sara serves as the organization's key spokesperson and is primarily responsible for fund development and overall oversight of the organization's business. She has served on the boards of international organizations concerned with child welfare. As a board member for the International Union for Child Welfare, she was the sole United States representative among First Ladies and ministers of numerous nations. She also served as chairman of the International Alliance of Child Abuse and Neglect.

Sara has received more than 100 awards for her service to children, including the Arizona Foundation for Women's Sandra Day O'Connor Award received in 2004. Most recently, Sara was awarded the 2008 Most Dynamic Woman of the Year award from Clarins USA. Others include an award for international collaboration to prevent child abuse presented by the Queen Elizabeth II of the United Kingdom; a U.S. Department of Justice award presented by President Ronald Reagan; the Kiwanis World Service Medal and an award from the National Federation of Business and Professional Women's Clubs. She has been the recipient of several awards in Washington, D.C., including the National Caring Award and the Hubert Humphrey Memorial Award at the Touchdown Club, and the Lifetime Achievement Award at the National Charity Awards Dinner. Sara, along with co-founder Yvonne Fedderson, have been nominated for the fourth time for the Nobel Peace Prize. Endorsements for the prestigious nomination include letters from U.S. Supreme Court Justice Sandra Day O'Connor and former First Lady Barbara Bush, along with numerous politicians, educators and corporate executives.

Sara O'Meara was born Sara Buckner in Knoxville, Tennessee and was educated at Briarcliff Junior College, New York; Endicott College, Massachusetts; The Sorbonne, France; and Pasadena Playhouse, California. Sara lives in Paradise Valley, Arizona. She has a son, John Hopkins. Her other son, Charles, died in 1988 in an auto accident. Sara also has two stepdaughters, Taryn and Whitney, and three grandchildren. Sara lost her husband Colonel Robert (Bob) Sigholtz in 2005. Bob was a highly decorated Colonel who fought in three wars – World War II, the Korean War and the Vietnam War. He was also the Athletic Director of Georgetown University.

=== Yvonne Fedderson ===
As a Childhelp Co-founder and President, Yvonne Fedderson was actively involved in the development and oversight of the organization. Yvonne's focus was upon developing and supporting the organization's more than 25 chapters and auxiliaries. More than 2,500 volunteers nationwide organize fund-raising events in their communities, which raise more than $2 million annually.

Since 1994, Yvonne also served as president and CEO of her late husband's company, Don Fedderson Productions. Her responsibilities include managing the rights of the television programs he produced, including Family Affair, My Three Sons, and The Betty White Show. She has served on the company's board of directors for more than 30 years. Yvonne, a graduate of the Pasadena Playhouse, under the name of Yvonne Lime, has had an extensive acting career in film, television and stage.

Yvonne was active in a number of humanitarian organizations including the Assistance League, and the Mary and Joseph League, as well as several professional organizations. She also served on the board of directors of Children to Children, Inc. and was an honorary board member for The Dyslexia Foundation.

Yvonne received more than 100 honors and awards for her service to children, some of which include the National Children's Alliance's Champions of Children Award, the State of California Legislature's Woman of the World Award, and the Women's International Center's Living Legacy Award. Most recently, Sara and Yvonne were awarded the 2008 Most Dynamic Woman of the Year award from Clarins USA. She and Sara have also been given the Kiwanis World Service Medal, the American Ireland Fund Humanitarian Award, The University of California Riverside Chancellor's Founder's Award, and Family Circle Magazine's "Women Who Make a Difference." Sara and Yvonne have been nominated for the fourth time for the Nobel Peace Prize. Endorsements for the prestigious nomination include letters from U.S. Supreme Court Justice Sandra Day O'Connor and former First Lady Barbara Bush, along with numerous politicians, educators, and corporate executives.

Yvonne Fedderson was born in Glendale, California and died January 23, 2026 at her home in Paradise Valley, Arizona. Her daughter Dionne Fedderson also lives in Paradise Valley.

=== Book and Lifetime movie ===
In 2003 Sara O'Meara and Yvonne Fedderson published the book Silence Broken: Moving From a Loss of Innocence to a World of Healing and Love. The book, based upon a true story, chronicles how Sara and Yvonne began their work with children and follows the story of the organization from the founders, associates and victims. The founders chronicle their participation in such well-known events as Operation Babylift. One little boy treated at the Childhelp Merv Griffin Village in Beaumont, California is the focus of the title. After witnessing his parents murder his sister, the little boy became totally silent and traveled through 15 different foster homes before finally ending up at the Village. The book details the Childhelp staff's attempt to get the boy to speak. After days, the man in charge of the Village's animal therapy program took the little boy to the barn and told him that "Chocolate," a pony, was now his responsibility. Every day, the little boy ran to the barn to take care of Chocolate. On the fifth day, he put his arms around the pony and said, "I love you." Once his silence had been broken, the boy rapidly began to heal.

In 2005, the book was developed into a Lifetime Network movie. For the Love of a Child regularly airs on the Lifetime Network and is an accurate representative of the book. Actress Peri Gilpin plays Sara O'Meara and actress Teri Polo plays Yvonne Fedderson. The film won two Young Artist Awards in 2007; Best Performance in a TV Movie, Miniseries or Special (Comedy or Drama) - Supporting Young Actor, Jake D. Smith; and Best Performance in a TV Movie, Miniseries or Special (Comedy or Drama) - Supporting Young Actress, Emily Hirst.

== History ==
Childhelp has enjoyed a rich history that has spanned internationally over 50 years and impacted the lives of millions of children. The organization first took roots in Japan in 1959 under the name of International Orphans to help the unwanted children of American soldiers and Japanese women. In 1976 the organization changed names to Children's Village USA then later to Childhelp USA before finally settling on Childhelp. Today it is one of the largest child abuse prevention non-profit organizations.

=== Japanese Orphanages ===
The Navy joins in to help Sara and Yvonne bring supplies to their orphanages in Japan.

In 1959 Sara and Yvonne traveled to Tokyo, Japan on a goodwill tour for the American troops stationed there after a large typhoon hit the region. While on the streets they encountered a group of children cold and frightened, huddled together. After learning the children had no parents and were born from American troops during the Korean War, the two actresses took the children to their hotel room for the night and sought out an orphanage the next day.

The following day they learned the children were turned away from all the orphanages because of their mixed heritage. They were told of a woman, Kin Horuchi, living in a one-room hut that kept several Japanese-American children.

Kin agreed to care for the 11 additional children and the ladies promised to send money to help the children. They thought the problem was settled, but word of what they were doing spread rapidly through the city. They had suddenly become surrogate mothers to a brood of 100 Japanese-American children that were left on the doorstep of the hut, which now needed to become an orphanage.

Returning to California, the actresses began to raise funds among friends and their families, as well as the film community to care for the children. From that beginning grew International Orphans Incorporated, an organization that eventually built four orphanages, caring for thousands of abandoned Japanese-American children.

=== Operation Babylift ===
In April 1975, American troops and Vietnamese refugees evacuated Vietnam in mass numbers before and during the fall of Saigon. Operation Babylift was the name given to the mass evacuation of children from South Vietnam to the United States and other countries (including, for example, Australia, France and Canada) at the end of the Vietnam War. The first flight crashed after the locks of the rear loading ramp failed, killing 138 people, among them 78 children. By the final American flight out of South Vietnam, over 2,000 infants and children had been evacuated.

Sara and Yvonne helped arrange Operation Babylift in America and saw thousands of children to adoption agencies. At the time Childhelp was named International Orphans.

== Services ==
Entrance to the Childhelp Headquarters in Scottsdale, Ariz.

Childhelp offers a variety of services to the children that enter its facilities, professionals in therapy and the community. Over the years the organization has broadened its facilities, incorporated previously established programs and helped bring them to a national audience and educated the public.

=== National Hotline ===
In 1982, Childhelp started the Childhelp National Child Abuse Hotline, 1-800-4-A-CHILD (1-800-422-4453). The hotline, staffed 24 hours a day, 365 days a year by professional crisis counselors has received over two million calls since its inception. The hotline receives calls from children at risk for abuse, parents or guardians looking for crisis intervention and concerned individuals who may suspect abuse is occurring in their neighborhood. The hotline also provides information and referrals to thousands of emergency, social service and support resources under complete confidentiality and anonymity.

The hotline receives absolutely no government funding and is supported by the generous donations of the community, organizations and foundations.

=== Advocacy Centers ===
Childhelp operates three advocacy centers in the U.S. that minimize the trauma to an abused child through condensing the investigative process by housing professionals in law enforcement, child protective services, medicine, mental health and prosecution all under one roof. The child friendly facilities provide an environment far more comfortable than an emergency room or police station for the children.

=== Treatment ===
Childhelp offers treatment to victims of child abuse through several different methods.

The first is at two residential treatment centers known as Villages. Both villages, located in rural communities in California and Virginia provide specialized, comprehensive treatment programs for court-referred, severally abused, neglected and at-risk children. A staff of therapists, teachers, social workers and medical professionals work at the villages to provide the children with the best possible care. A combination of psychotherapy, education, art, music, animal-assisted, spiritual and recreation therapies are used. Children typically live at a Childhelp village between three months and two years.

Childhelp also operates community-based group homes in both California and Virginia. Children often will transition from one of the residential treatment villages to the smaller group homes. The group homes provide an intensive level of supervision and therapeutic services in order to prepare children for the transition to non-institutional care in foster homes, adoptive homes or the home of their family or relatives.

Lastly, Childhelp provides long and short-term foster care in California and Tennessee. The organization is licensed to recruit, screen, train and certify foster care parents, and provides ongoing support to both foster parents and the children in their care.

=== Childhelp Speak Up Be Safe for Educators ===
Formerly known for 3 decades as Childhelp Good Touch, Bad Touch, this research-based, comprehensive child abuse and bullying prevention education curriculum equips students nationwide with skills they need to play a significant role in the prevention or interruption of abuse and bullying. Childhelp Speak Up Be Safe is delivered through an online virtual campus and covers topics such as physical abuse, sexual abuse, emotional abuse, neglect, bullying and cyberbullying, all at an age appropriate level. Through the use of integrated student materials, safety rules continue to be reinforced after the initial instruction in the classroom.

=== Childhelp Speak Up Be Safe for Athletes ===
The Childhelp Blow the Whistle on Child Abuse program, funded by Olympic Consultants and the Foundation for Global Sports Development, was created to raise awareness of child abuse in youth sports. The program provides information to coaches, parents, educators, and community members about recognizing the signs and symptoms of child abuse. It also teaches children personal safety skills and strategies for responding to potentially harmful situations through activity-based learning.

=== Community outreach ===
Community outreach is important to the organization to obtain new volunteers, donors and to spread the message about child abuse. Childhelp obtains a variety of public awareness including distributing brochures and other printed materials, media appearances and stories and public service announcements. Childhelp has produced a 30-second PSA available to both radio and television networks to air. The organization also holds numerous charity events year-long that draw in public donations and create strong community awareness.

In 2000, Childhelp founded the Childhelp National Day of Hope. Held in Washington, D.C., on the first Wednesday of April (Child Abuse Prevention Month) every year, the event regularly draws the support and participation of numerous members of the United States Congress.

== Advocacy Ambassadors ==
Over several decades and with the help of Sara O'Meara and Yvonne Fedderson's history as Hollywood actresses, Childhelp has drawn numerous celebrities and everyday volunteers to support the organization's cause, promote it in the media, attend special fund raising events, and give up their time and talents for a cause. Notable active celebrity ambassadors include Kathie Lee Gifford, Casper Van Dien and Catherine Oxenberg, Jane Seymour and Mary Costa.

In 2008, Sara and Yvonne were guests of Kathie Lee's on the Today Show to speak about the epidemic of child abuse.

In 2007, Jane Seymour sponsored an Art Pillow contest as part of the Jane Seymour Collection. Children ages 7–14 were challenged to create the design to appear on the pillow, which was revealed in April 2007 in connection with Child Abuse Prevention Month.

The following are or have been Childhelp Advocacy Ambassadors:

Susan Anton, The Bellamy Brothers, Bertrand Berry, Pat Boone, Joyce Bulifant, Gary Collins, Carol Connors, Mary Costa, Norm Crosby, John D'Aquino, Phyllis Diller, Ami Dolenz, Ralna English, Rhonda Fleming, Raymond Floyd, David Foster, Glenn Frey, Leeza Gibbons, Kathie Lee Gifford, Melissa Gilbert, Peri Gilpin, Amy Grant, Lee Greenwood, Mary Hart, Florence Henderson, Tyler Hoechlin, Crystal Hunt, Anne Jeffreys, David Keith, Megyn Kelly, Cheryl Ladd, Carol Lawrence, Mario Lopez, Ron Masak, Mary Ann Mobley, Phil Morris, Nancy O'Dell, Jamie O'Neal, Merlin Olsen, Catherine Oxenberg, Matthew Perry, Sasha Pieterse, Jimmy Pinchak, Collin Raye, Mackenzie Rosman, Jack Scalia, Andrea Schroder, Rick Schroder, Laura Schlessinger, Jane Seymour, T. G. Sheppard, John Stamos, Connie Stevens, George Stults, Alan Thicke, Linda Thompson, Pam Tillis, Heather Tom, Kathleen Turner, Casper Van Dien, Phil Vassar, Caitlin Wachs, Betty White, Barbara Young, Steve Young, Jack Youngblood, Efrem Zimbalist, Jr.

The following women have been recognized with the Childhelp Woman of the World Award:

2023 – Reba McEntire 2021 – Dr. Stacie J. Stephenson 2015 – Melani Walton 2014 – Beverly Cohen 2011 – Jan Brewer 2010 – Lonnie Ali 2009 – First Lady Nancy Reagan 2008 – First Lady Laura Bush 2005 – Carole Black 2003 – Marianne Williamson 2002 – Lynne Cheney 2001 – Kathleen Turner 2000 – Esther Snyder 1999 – Marie Gray and Nancy O'Dell 1998 – Janice Dickinson and Deidre Hall 1997 – Kathie Lee Gifford and Leeza Gibbons 1996 – Loni Anderson and Mary Hart 1995 – Julie Harris and Marlo Thomas 1994 – Marilyn McCoo and Sally Struthers 1993 – Cyd Charisse and Carol Lawrence 1992 – Oprah Winfrey and Barbara Mandrell 1991 – Georgette Mosbacher and Ann Blythe McNulty 1990 – Barbara Eden and Jane Seymour 1989 – Phyllis Diller and Mary Ann Mobley 1988 – Shirley Jones and Connie Stevens 1987 – Anne Jeffreys and Cheryl Ladd 1986 – Dolores Hope and Betty White 1985 – First Lady Barbara Bush 1984 – Florence Henderson and Barbara Sinatra 1983 – Rhonda Fleming and Jane Russell 1982 – Shirley Boone and Mary Martin 1981 – Joanna Carson, Debbie Reynolds, and Jill Kinmont Boothe 1980 – Julie Andrews and Nanette Fabray 1979 – Dorothy DeBolt and Greer Garson-Fogelson 1978 – Betty Ford and Alice Tyler 1977 – Patti Lewis and Abigail Van Buren 1976 – June Haber MacMurray and Rose Marie Thomas 1975 – Kitty LeRoy and Rosalind Russell 1974 – Vikki Carr and Kay Gable 1973 – Merle Oberon and Ivy Baker Priest 1971 – Maria Cole Devore and Jane Wyman 1970 – Kin Horiuchi and Louise Tracy 1969 – Janne Dixon 1968 – Dorothy Ritter 1967 – Kathryn Crosby 1966 – Bertha Holt and Angela Crocetti 1965 – Shirley MacLaine and Miki Sawada 1964 – Dale Evans
