= Flanging =

Audio effect

Example of flanging
A short sample followed by two flanging versions

Another example of flanging
A short sample with distorted electric bass sound followed by three flanged versions

Flanging /ˈflændʒɪŋ/ is an audio effect produced by mixing two identical signals together, one signal delayed by a small and (usually) gradually changing period, usually smaller than 20 milliseconds. This produces a swept comb filter effect: peaks and notches are produced in the resulting frequency spectrum, related to each other in a linear harmonic series. Varying the time delay causes these to sweep up and down the frequency spectrum. A flanger is an effects unit that creates this effect.

Part of the output signal is usually fed back to the input (a re-circulating delay line), producing a resonance effect that further enhances the intensity of the peaks and troughs. The phase of the fed-back signal is sometimes inverted, producing another variation on the flanger sound.

== Origin ==
As an audio effect, a listener hears a drainpipe or swoosh or jet plane sweeping effect as shifting sum-and-difference harmonics are created, analogous to the use of a variable notch filter. The term "flanging" comes from one of the early methods of producing the effect. The finished music track is recorded simultaneously to two matching tape machines, then replayed with both decks in sync. The output from the two recorders is mixed to a third recorder. The engineer slows down one playback recorder by lightly pressing a finger on the flange (rim) of the supply reel. The drainpipe or subtle swoosh effect sweeps in one direction, and the playback of that recorder remains slightly behind the other when the finger is removed. By pressing a finger on the flange of the other deck, the effect sweeps back in the other direction as the decks progress towards being in sync. The Beatles' producer George Martin disputed this reel flange source, attributing the term to himself and John Lennon instead.

Despite claims over who originated flanging, Les Paul discovered the effect in the late 1940s and 1950s; however, he did most of his early phasing experiments with acetate disks on variable-speed record players. On "Mammy's Boogie" (1952) he used two disk recorders, one with a variable speed control. The first hit song with a very discernible flanging effect was "The Big Hurt" (1959) by Toni Fisher.

Further development of the classic effect is attributed to Ken Townsend, an engineer at EMI's Abbey Road Studio, who devised a process in the spring of 1966. Tired of laboriously re-recording dual vocal tracks, John Lennon asked Townsend if there was some way for the Beatles to get the sound of double-tracked vocals without doing the work. Townsend devised automatic double tracking (ADT). According to historian Mark Lewisohn, it was Lennon who first called the technique "flanging". Lennon asked George Martin to explain how ADT worked, and Martin answered with the nonsense explanation "Now listen, it's very simple. We take the original image and we split it through a double vibrocated sploshing flange with double negative feedback". Lennon thought Martin was joking. Martin replied, "Well, let's flange it again and see". From that point, when Lennon wanted ADT, he would ask for his voice to be flanged, or call out for "Ken's flanger". According to Lewisohn, the Beatles' influence meant the term "flanging" is still in use today, more than 50 years later. The first Beatles track to feature flanging was "Tomorrow Never Knows" from Revolver, recorded on 6 April 1966. When Revolver was released on 5 August 1966, almost every song had been subjected to flanging.

Others have attributed it to George Chkiantz, an engineer at Olympic Studios in Barnes, London. Two early British pop examples of flanging occur in the Small Faces' single "Itchycoo Park" alongside Cat Stevens single "A Bad Night" (both 1967), both recorded at Olympic and engineered by Chkiantz's colleague Glyn Johns.

Itchycoo Park – The Small Faces
Tape flanging effect on the 1967 single "Itchycoo Park".

The first stereo flanging is credited to producer Eddie Kramer, in the coda of Jimi Hendrix's "Bold as Love" (1967). Kramer said in the 1990s that he read BBC Radiophonic Workshop journals for ideas and circuit diagrams.

Kendrick's setup to control flanging

In 1968, the record producer for the Litter, Warren Kendrick, devised a method to precisely control flanging by placing two 15 ips (inches per second) stereo Ampex tape recorders side by side. The take-up reel of recorder A and supply reel of B were disabled, as were channel 2 of recorder A, channel 1 of recorder B and the erase head of recorder B. The tape was fed left-to-right across both recorders and an identical signal was recorded on each channel of the tape, but displaced by approximately 18 inches along the length of the tape. During recording, an ordinary screwdriver was wedged between the recorders to make the tape run "uphill" and "downhill." The same configuration was employed during the playback/mixdown to a third recorder. The screwdriver was moved back and forth to cause the two signals to diverge, then converge. The latter technique permits zero point flanging; i.e., the lagging signal crosses over the leading signal and the signals change places.

A similar "jet plane-like" effect can occur naturally in long-distance shortwave radio music broadcasts. In this case, the delays are caused by variable radio wave propagation time and multipath radio interference.

== Artificial flanging ==
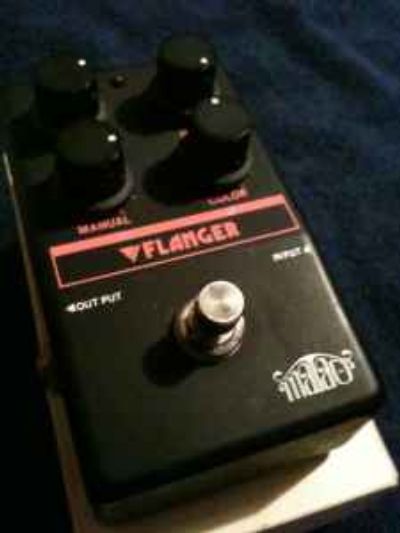
Matao Flanger effects pedal.

In the 1970s, advances in solid-state electronics made flanging possible using integrated circuit technology. Solid-state flanging devices fall into two categories: analog and digital. The Eventide Instant Flanger from 1975 is an early example of a studio device that was able to successfully simulate tape flanging using bucket-brigades to create the audio delay. The flanging effect in most newer digital flangers relies on DSP technology. Flanging can also be accomplished using computer software.

The original tape-flanging effect sounds a little different from electronic and software recreations. Not only is the tape-flanging signal time-delayed, but response characteristics at different frequencies of the tape and tape heads introduced phase shifts into the signals as well. Thus, while the peaks and troughs of the comb filter are more or less in a linear harmonic series, there is a significant non-linear behaviour too, causing the timbre of tape-flanging to sound more like a combination of what came to be known as flanging and phasing.

=== "Barber pole" flanging ===
Also known as "infinite flanging", this sonic illusion is similar to the Shepard tone effect, and is equivalent to an auditory "barber pole". The sweep of the flanged sound seems to move in only one direction ("up" or "down") infinitely, instead of sweeping back-and-forth. While Shepard tones are created by generating a cascade of tones, fading in and out while sweeping the pitch either up or down, barber pole flanging uses a cascade of multiple delay lines, fading each one into the mix and fading it out as it sweeps to the delay time limit. The effect is available on various hardware and software effect systems.

== Comparison with phase shifting ==
Spectrograms of phasing and flanging effects

Flanging is one specific type of phase-shifting, or "phasing". In phasing, the signal is passed through one or more all-pass filters with non-linear phase response and then added back to the original signal. This results in constructive and destructive interference that varies with frequency, giving a series of peaks and troughs in the frequency response of the system. In general, the position of these peaks and troughs do not occur in a harmonic series.

In contrast, flanging relies on adding the signal to a uniform time-delayed copy of itself, which results in an output signal with peaks and troughs that are in a harmonic series. Extending the comb analogy, flanging yields a comb filter with regularly spaced teeth, whereas phasing results in a comb filter with irregularly spaced teeth.

In both phasing and flanging, the characteristics (phase response and time delay, respectively) are generally varied in time, leading to an audible sweeping effect. To the ear, flanging and phasing sound similar, yet they are recognizable as distinct colorations. Commonly, flanging is referred to as having a "jet-plane-like" characteristic. In order for the comb filter effect to be audible, the spectral content of the program material must be full enough within the frequency range of this moving comb filter to reveal the filter's effect. It is more apparent when it is applied to material with a rich harmonic content, and is most obvious when applied to a white noise or similar noise signal. If the frequency response of this effect is plotted on a linearly-scaled graph, the trace resembles a comb, and so is called a comb filter.

== See also ==
- Moiré pattern
- Phaser (effect)
