= Mike Minor (actor) =

American actor (1940–2016)

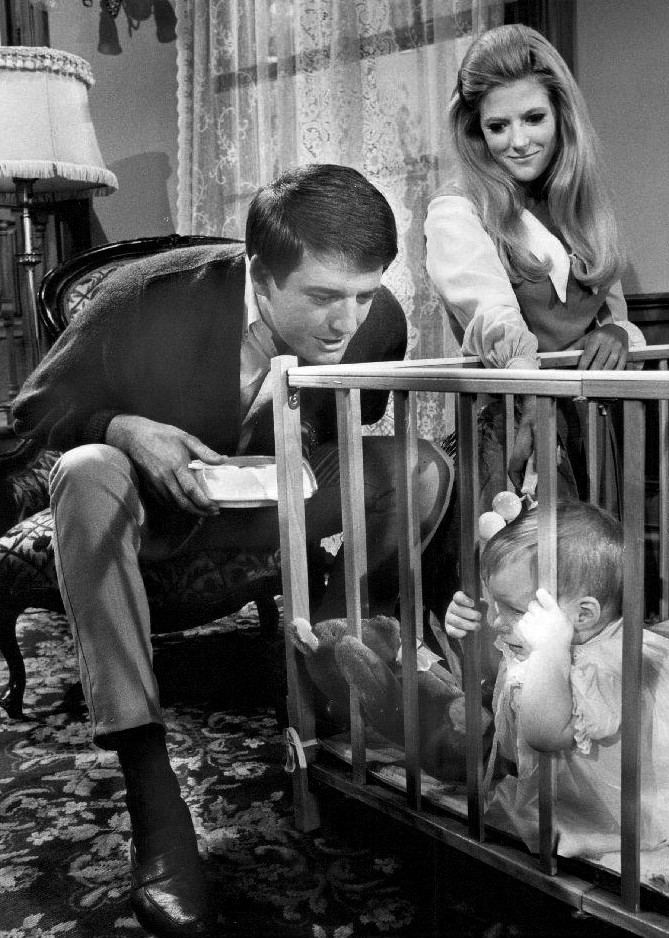
- Mike Minor and Meredith MacRae on TV's Petticoat Junction (1969)
- Born: Michael Fedderson; December 7, 1940; San Francisco, California, U.S.
- Died: January 28, 2016 (aged 75); New York City, U.S.
- Occupations: Actor, singer
- Years active: 1962–2005
- Height: 6 ft 2 in (1.88 m)
- Spouse(s): Monyeen Rae Martini (1961–1966; divorced); Linda Kaye Henning (1968–1973; divorced); Marilyn Minor (1981–2016; his death)
- Children: 1
- Parent(s): Don Fedderson; Helen Macie "Tido" Minor

Michael Fedderson (December 7, 1940 – January 28, 2016), known as Mike Minor, was an American actor best known for his role as Steve Elliott on Petticoat Junction (1966–1970).

== Early life ==
Michael Fedderson was born on December 7, 1940, in San Francisco to model/actress Helen Macie "Tido" Minor and newspaper advertising man Don Fedderson, who would later become a leading television producer.

He began voice lessons in 1953 at the age of 13. His first singing job was at Ye Little Club in Beverly Hills, where he was engaged for two weeks and held over for ten. He attended University High School in Los Angeles and Brown Military Academy in San Diego. After that he appeared at Bimbo's 365 Club in San Francisco, the Rat Fink Room in New York City, the Elegante in Brooklyn, Izzy's Supper Club in Vancouver and the Beverly Hilton Hotel in Los Angeles.

== Career ==
=== Television ===
In 1961, Minor played the character Ray in an episode of My Three Sons, a show produced by his father. Before he played cropduster Steve Elliott on Petticoat Junction in seasons four through seven (1966–70), two years earlier, Mike Minor guest-starred as Dan Plout (the son of Kate's nemesis Selma Plout) who Kate thought older daughter Billie Jo was going to marry in episode 11 of the second season ("Mother Of The Bride", December 15, 1964). Two years later, in the second show of season four, Minor portrayed Steve Elliott, a pilot, who crashed his airplane in Hooterville, then recovered and eventually married the character Betty Jo Bradley. Seasons 6 and 7 of the series focused on the newlywed couple of Betty Jo and Steve, and their newborn daughter Kathy Jo Elliott. Many sources erroneously reported that Minor sang the series' title song; in fact, it was sung by Curt Massey, the series' music composer, who co-wrote the song with show creator and producer Paul Henning.

Among Minor's other television credits were The Donald O'Connor Show (1968 version), The Beverly Hillbillies, CHiPs, Vega$, and L.A. Law.

In the 1970s, Minor made brief appearances on daytime shows The Edge of Night and As the World Turns. In the 1980s, he appeared as Brandon Kingsley on All My Children (1980–1982) and as Dr. Royal Dunning on Another World (1983–1984).

=== Stage ===
In 1968, Minor made his stage debut, playing the romantic lead in The Impossible Years with Ozzie and Harriet Nelson.

=== Music ===
Minor recorded two albums, including This Is Mike Minor (1966), and numerous singles, including the successful "Silver Dollar" and "One Day at a Time".

Minor sang the theme song ("Primrose Lane") on season one of the Henry Fonda television series The Smith Family.

== Personal life ==
Minor's childhood ambition was to be a professional baseball player, but when he matured he switched to golf. He was a member of the Hollywood Hackers, an organization of show-biz golfers who travelled around the country playing at choice golf courses and entertaining the spectators. On July 22, 1961, Minor married Monyeen Rae Martini; the couple had one son but the marriage ended in divorce.

On September 7, 1968, he married Linda Kaye Henning, who played Betty Jo on Petticoat Junction, following a romance that began on the set. They divorced five years later and had no children. Minor married Marilyn Minor in 1981.

== Death ==
Minor died on January 28, 2016, at age 75.
